= Alsace wine =

Wine from the Alsace region in France

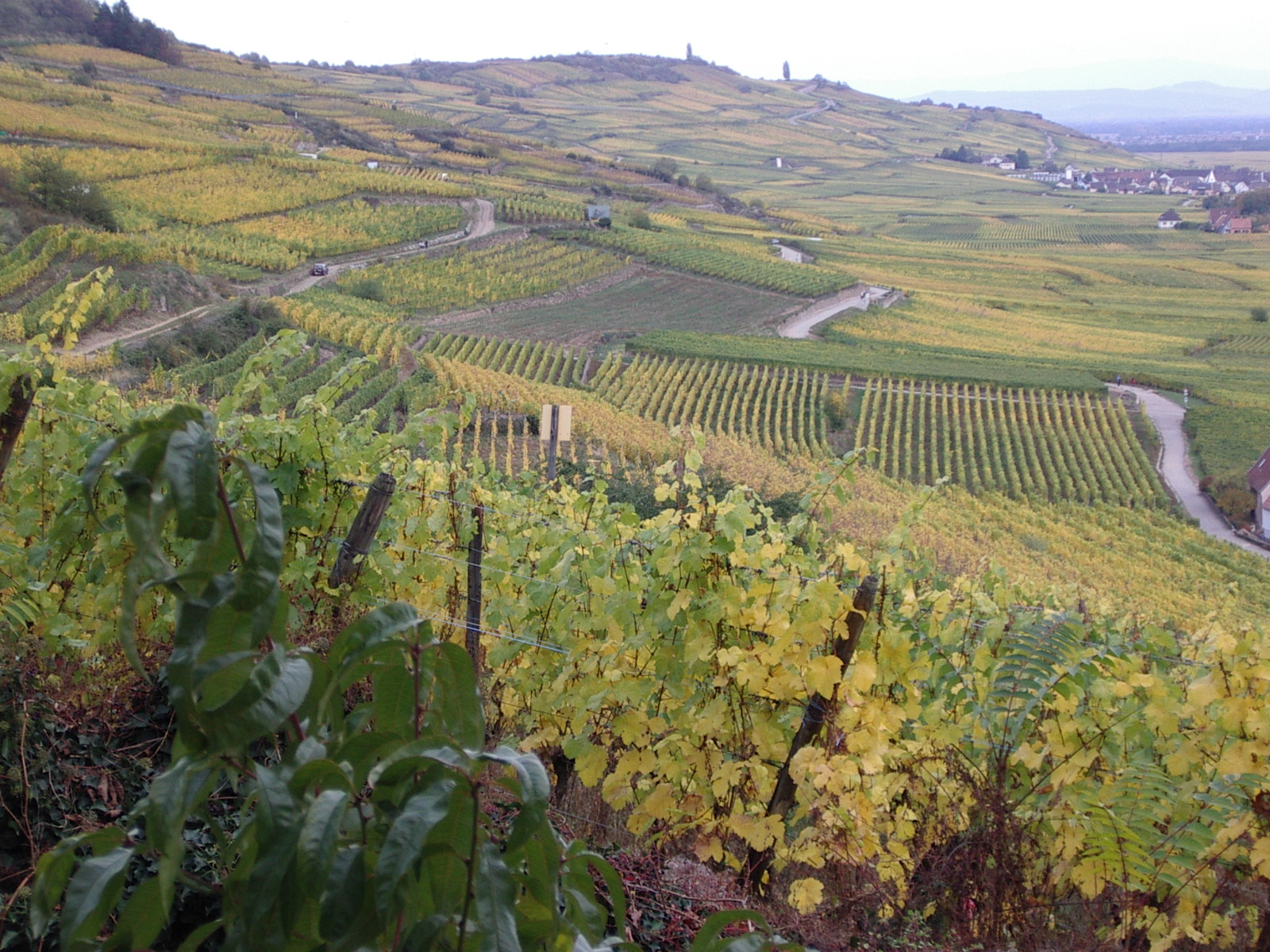
Vineyards close to the village Kaysersberg in Alsace.

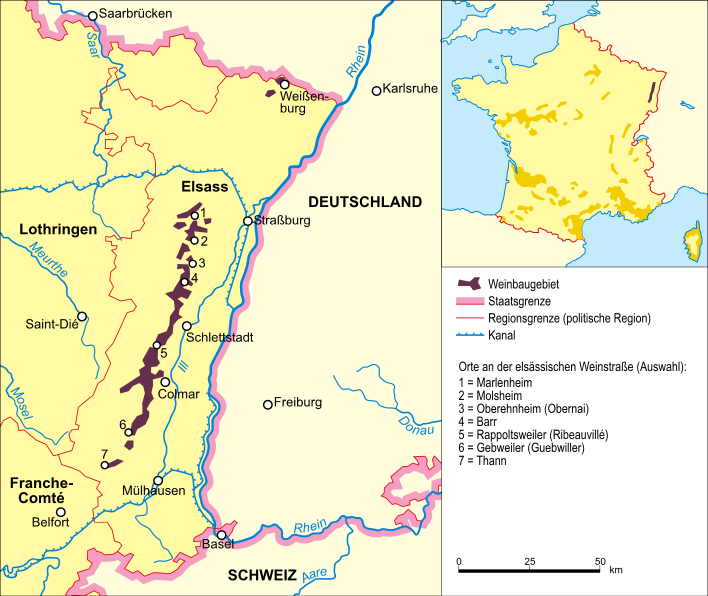
Map of Alsace with the location of the wine-growing region and some villages marked.

Alsace wine or Alsatian wine (French: Vin d'Alsace; German: Elsässer Wein; Haut Rhin Alsatian: d'r Wii vum Elsàss; Bas Rhin Alsatian: de Win vum Elsàss) is produced in the Alsace region in France and is primarily white wine. Because of its Germanic influence, it is the only Appellation d'Origine Contrôlée region in France to produce mostly varietal wines, typically from similar grape varieties to those used in German wine. Along with Austria and Germany, it produces some of the most noted dry Rieslings in the world as well as highly aromatic Gewürztraminer wines. Wines are produced under three different AOCs: Alsace AOC for white, rosé and red wines (pinot noir), Alsace Grand Cru AOC for white wines from certain classified vineyards and Crémant d'Alsace AOC for sparkling wines. Both dry and sweet white wines are produced.

In 2006, vines were grown on 15,298 hectares (37,800 acres) in 119 villages in Alsace, and 111.3 million litres of wine was produced, corresponding to 148.4 million bottles of 750 mL, generating 478.8 million euro in revenue. Of the vineyard surface, 78% was classified for the production of AOC Alsace wines, 4% for AOC Alsace Grand Cru, and 18% for AOC Crémant d'Alsace. About 90% of the wine produced is white. 25% of the production is exported, and the five largest export markets for still Alsace wine in terms of volume are Belgium, Netherlands, Germany, Denmark and the United States.

== History ==
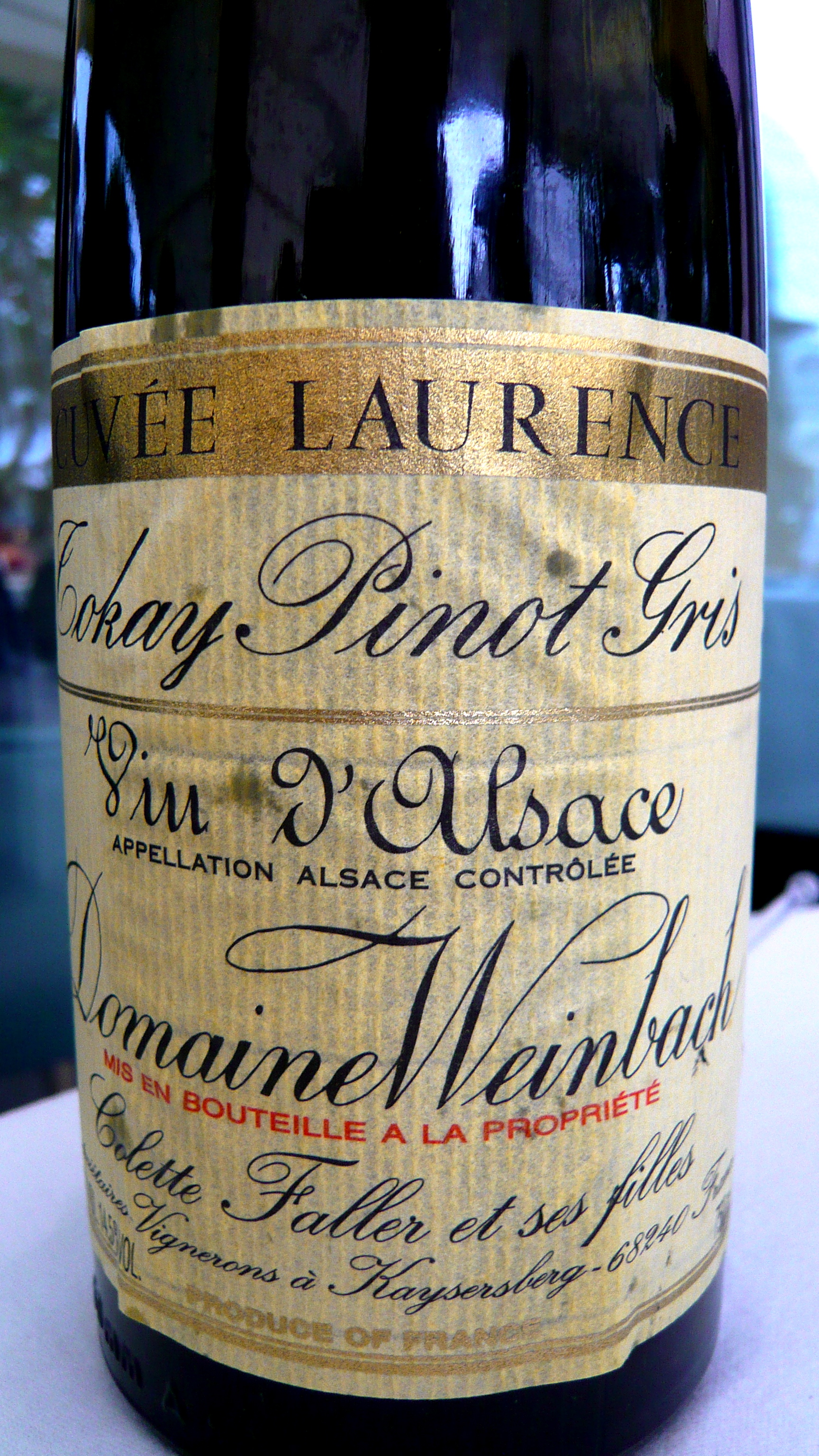
A 2000 vintage Alsace wine labelled Tokay Pinot gris.

An important influence in the history of Alsace wine has been the repeated changes of nationality of the Alsace region, which has passed from France to Germany and vice versa several times throughout history. In the early history of the Alsace wine industry, they were traded together with other German wines since Rhine provided the means to transport the wines. In much of the post–World War II era, wine styles in Alsace and Germany diverged, as Alsace wines remained fully fermented, that is dry, to a large extent because they were intended to be paired with food. In the same era, Alsace has also experienced a drive to higher quality, which led to AOC status being awarded. In recent decades, the difference between Alsace and Germany has diminished, since German wines have become drier and more powerful, while many Alsace wines have become sweeter and the late harvest and dessert style wines have been "rediscovered" in Alsace since the VT and SGN designations were introduced in 1983.

The total vineyard surface in Alsace has increased over the last decades, although the total French vineyard surface has decreased. In 1967, there were 9,400 hectares (23,000 acres) of Alsace vineyards, in 1982, 11,750 hectares (29,000 acres), and in 2007, 15,300 hectares (38,000 acres). Over the same period of time, among the varieties, Pinot gris has increased the most, from 4% to 15% of the vineyard surface, while Sylvaner has decreased the most.

=== Use of the name "Tokay" in Alsace ===
The grape variety Pinot gris is believed to have been taken to Hungary in the 14th century, where it was named Szürkebarát. It is further believed to have been brought back to Alsace by General Lazarus von Schwendi after his campaign against the Turks in the 16th century. It was planted in Kientzheim under the name "Tokay", taken from Hungary's most famous wine Tokaji, which does not use Pinot gris, but rather Furmint and Hárslevelű mainly. For a long time, the Alsatian wines produced from this variety were labelled Tokay d'Alsace. However, in 1993, an agreement was reached between Hungary and the European Union (of which Hungary was not yet a member) to phase out the name Tokay from non-Hungarian wine. In the case of Alsace, the name Tokay Pinot gris was used as an intermediate step, with the "Tokay" part eliminated in 2007.

== Geography, geology and terroir ==
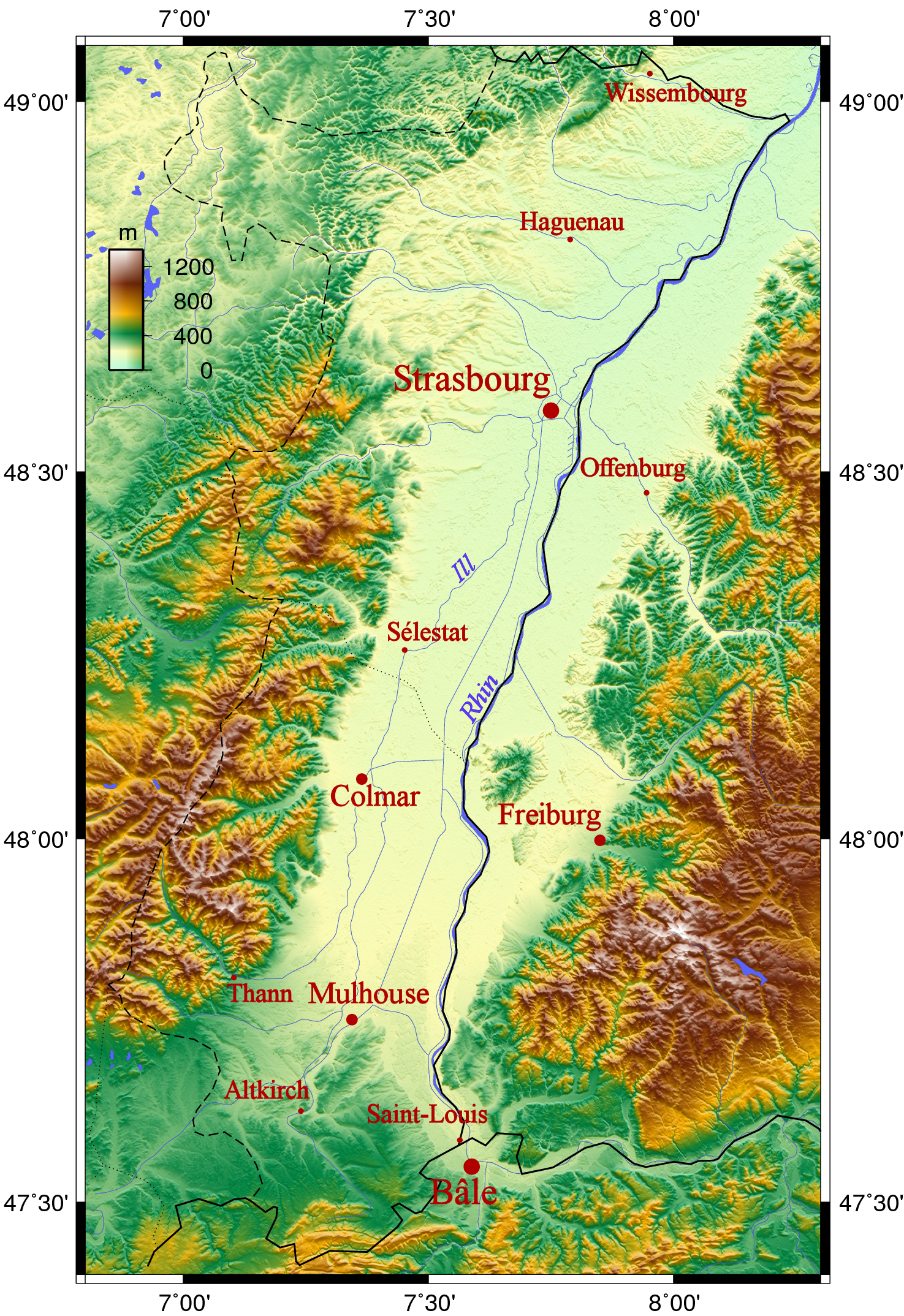
Topgraphic map of Alsace showing the importance of the Vosges to the west and river Rhine to the east. Most vineyards are located on the lower stretches of the Vosges, just above the plains leading down to Rhine. Notice the presence of hills and minor valleys which mean that not just eastern, but also southern and northern slopes can be found in Alsace vineyards.

The geography of the wine growing area in Alsace is determined by two main factors, the Vosges mountains in the west and the Rhine river in the east. The vineyards are concentrated in a narrow strip, running in a roughly north–south direction, on the lower eastern slopes of the Vosges, at altitudes of 175–420 metres (574–1,378 ft). Those altitudes provide a good balance between temperature, drainage and sun exposure under Alsace's growing conditions. Because of predominantly westerly winds, the Vosges mountains tend to shelter Alsace from rain and maritime influence, and the region is therefore rather dry and sunny. The city of Colmar in the Haut-Rhin department of Alsace receives approximately 600 millimetres (24 in) of precipitation a year on average, but the amount can vary greatly between sites. While the slope down the Vosges is generally east-facing, many of the best sites are south-west to south-east facing, and benefit from extra sun exposure.

Alsace's geology is quite varied, with many different kinds of soils represented in the vineyards. Alsace's soils are a result of its location at a geological fault. Alsace as a whole is located on the western part of the Rhine Graben, which is the result of two systems of parallel faults, with a dropped down block between the Vosges and the Black Forest.

== Wine styles ==
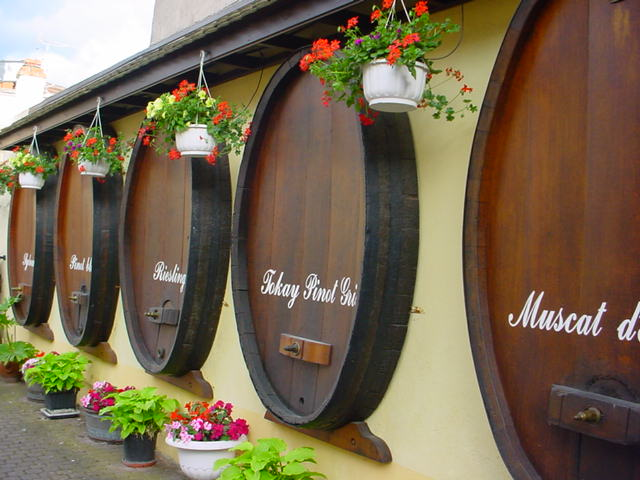
Barrels in Alsace for wines of several notable varieties.

Almost all wines are white, except those made from the Pinot noir grape which are pale red, often rosé, rarely red (e.g. Rouge d'Ottrott). Sparkling wines known as Crémant d'Alsace are also made. Much of the white wines of Alsace are made from aromatic grape varieties, so many characteristic Alsace wines are aromatic, floral and spicy. Since they very seldom have any oak barrel aromas they tend to be very varietally pure in their character. Traditionally all Alsace wines were dry (which once set them apart from German wines with which they share many grape varieties), but an ambition to produce wines with more intense and fruity character has led some producers to produce wines which contain some residual sugar. Since until 2020 there was no official labeling that differentiated completely dry from off-dry (or even semi-sweet) wines, this occasionally led to some confusion among consumers. It is more common to find residual sugar in Gewürztraminer and Pinot gris, which reach a higher natural sugar content on ripeness, than in Riesling, Muscat or Sylvaner. Usually there is a "house style" as to residual sugar, i.e., some producers only produce totally dry wines, except for their dessert style wines.

Almost all production in Alsace is of AOC wine, since there is no Vin de pays region which covers Alsace. Thus, the only alternative to producing AOC wine is to declassify it all the way down to Vin de table, which generally means that neither grape varieties, region of origin or vintage may be identified. However, this solution is mostly avoided since edelzwicker and gentil may be blended from several varieties, i.e. varieties that exceed the AOC rules in the concerned season.

=== Bottles ===
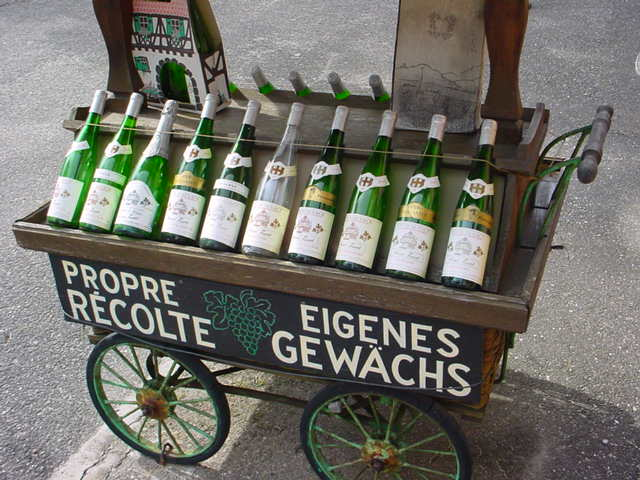
Bottles of Alsace wine, of the typical flûte shape.

There is a legal requirement for bottling Alsace wine in tall bottles commonly called flûtes d'Alsace. In the AOC rules, the bottle type is actually called vin du Rhin, i.e., "Rhine wine bottle". Without being mandated by law, this bottle format is also common and traditional in many German regions, particularly for Riesling and other traditional white wine varieties.

=== Late harvest wines ===
There are two late harvest classifications, Vendange Tardive (VT) and Sélection de Grains Nobles (SGN). Vendange Tardive means "late harvest" (which in German would be Spätlese), but in terms of must weight requirements, VT is similar to Auslese in Germany. Sélection de Grains Nobles means "selection of noble berries", i.e. grapes affected by noble rot, and is similar to a German Beerenauslese. For both VT and SGN, Alsace wines tend to be higher in alcohol and therefore slightly lower in sugar than the corresponding German wines. Therefore, Riesling VT and Muscat VT tend to be semi-sweet rather than sweet, while Gewürztraminer and Pinot gris tend to be rather sweet already at VT level. But as is the case with sweetness in other Alsace wines, this depends to a large extent on the house style of the producer.

The required level of ripeness of the grapes, which was increased in 2001, are as follows, expressed as sugar content of the must and potential alcohol:

The producer Aimé Stentz produces a late harvest Pinot blanc known as Pi-Noblesse, which is ineligible for either VT or SGN labelling.

| Varieties | VT since 2014 | SGN since 2014 | VT before 2001 | SGN before 2001 |
|---|---|---|---|---|
| Gewürztraminer; Pinot gris | 270 grams per liter or 15.3% potential alcohol or 110 °Oe | 306 grams per liter or 18.2% potential alcohol or 128 °Oe | 14.3% potential alcohol or 104 °Oe | 16.4% potential alcohol or 117 °Oe |
| Riesling; Muscat | 244 grams per liter or 14% potential alcohol or 102 °Oe | 276 grams per liter or 16.4% potential alcohol or 117 °Oe | 12.9% potential alcohol or 94 °Oe | 15.1% potential alcohol or 108 °Oe |

The minimum required must weights have again been increased to the following:

VT: Riesling, Muscat, Muscat Ottonel: 235 g/L (formerly 220 g/L); Pinot Gris, Gewürztraminer: 257 g/L (formerly 243 g/L)

SGN: Riesling, Muscat, Muscat Ottonel: 276 g/L (formerly 256 g/L); Pinot Gris, Gewürztraminer: 306 g/L (formerly 279 g/L)

== Grape varieties ==
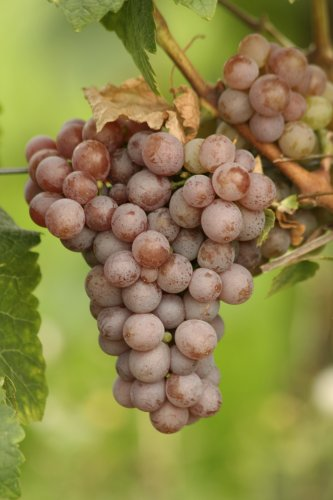
Gewürztraminer, which tends to be red-skinned but is considered a white variety, is common in Alsace.

| Variety | Area 2008 (proportion) |
|---|---|
| Riesling | 21.7% |
| Gewürztraminer | 18.6% |
| Pinot gris | 15.2% |
| Auxerrois blanc | 14.2% |
| Pinot noir | 9.6% |
| Sylvaner | 8.9% |
| Pinot blanc | 7.0% |
| Muscat varieties | 2.3% |
| Chasselas | 0.6% |
| Other, including Chardonnay and Savagnin | 1.3% |
| Mixed vineyards | 0.6% |
| Sum | 15 535 ha |

Over the last decades, plantings of Riesling, Pinot noir and in particular Pinot gris have increased, while Sylvaner (once the most grown variety) and Chasselas have been on the decrease.

=== Varietal labels and similar designations ===
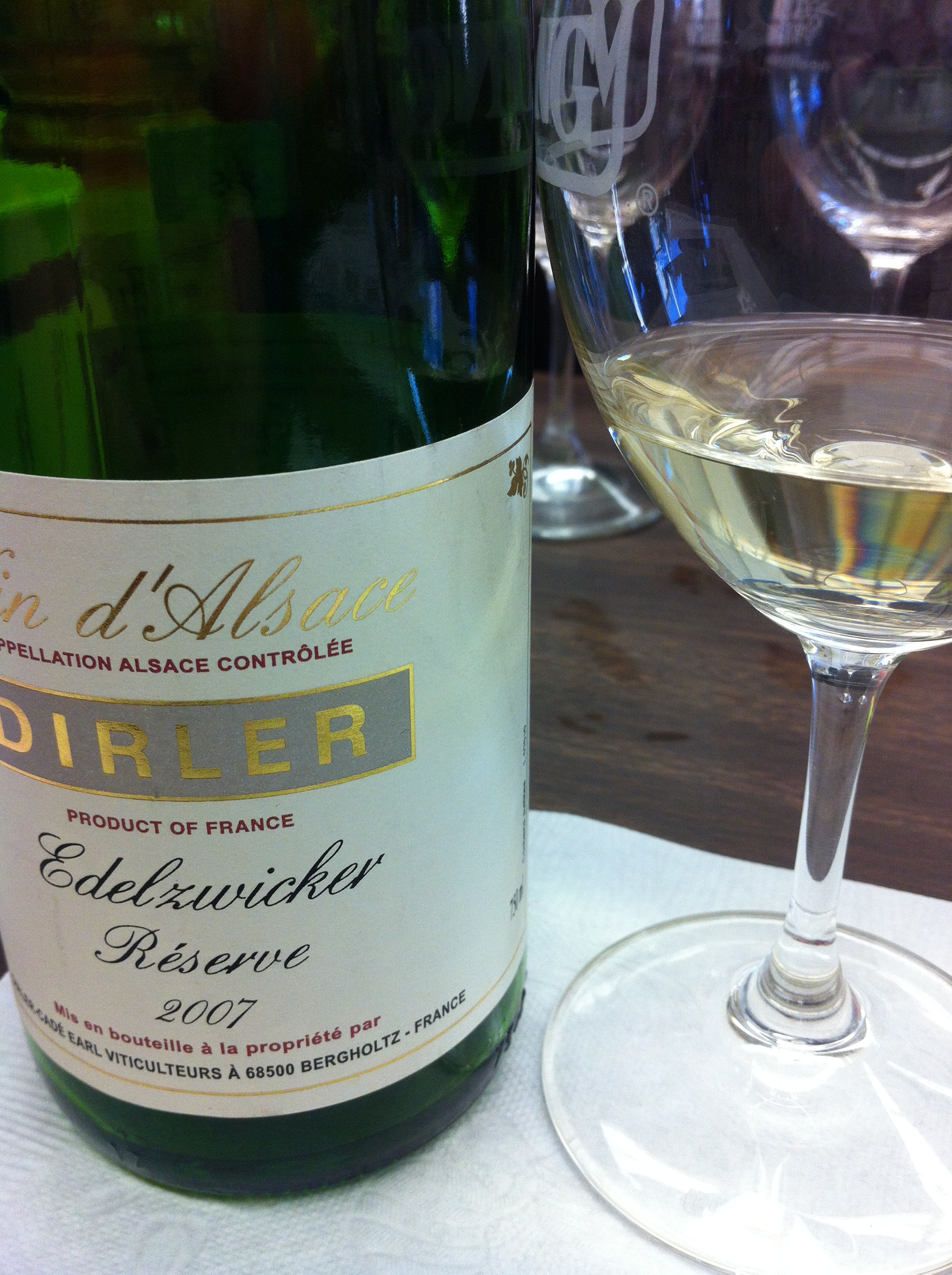
An Edelzwicker.

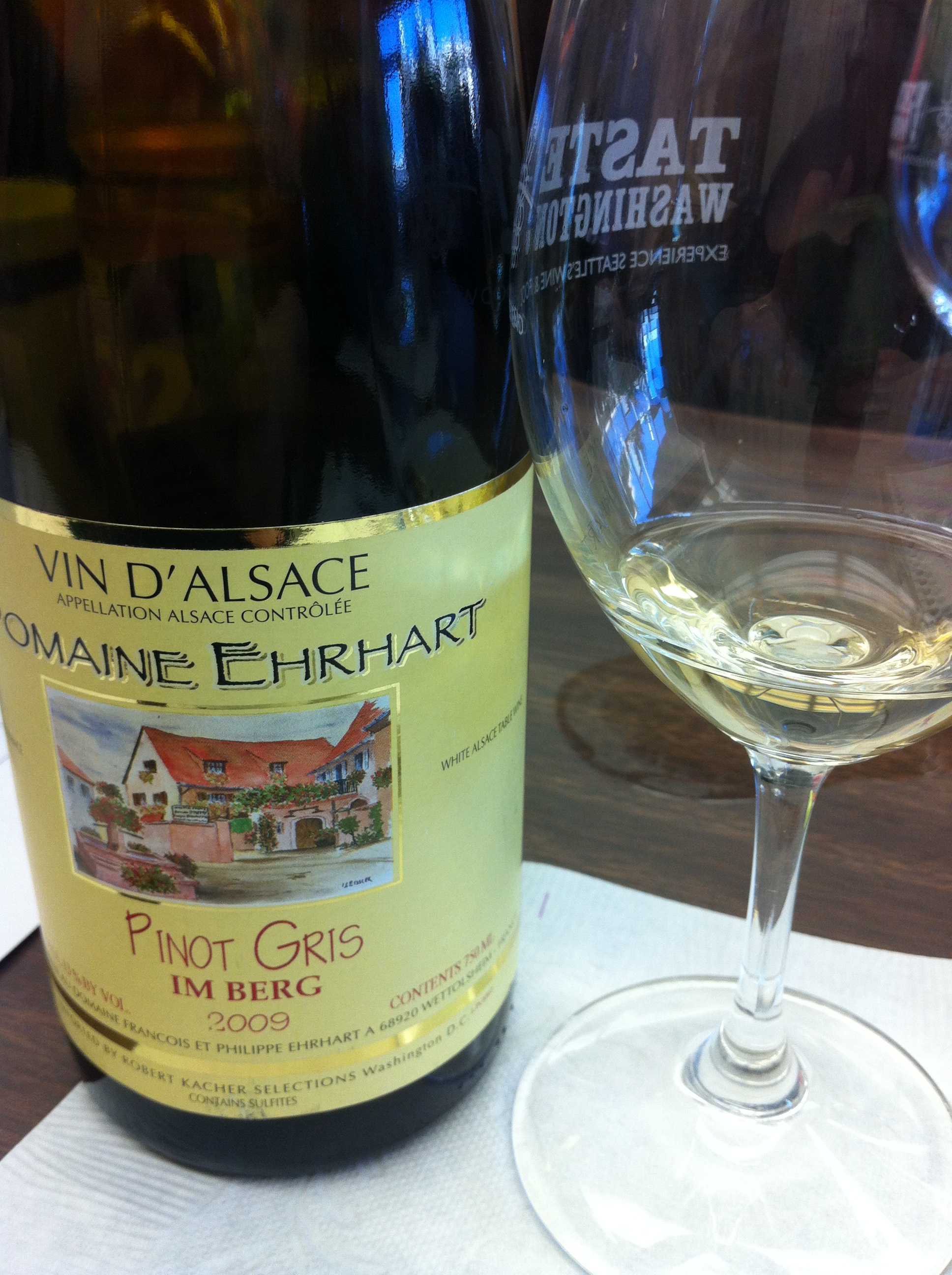
A Pinot gris.

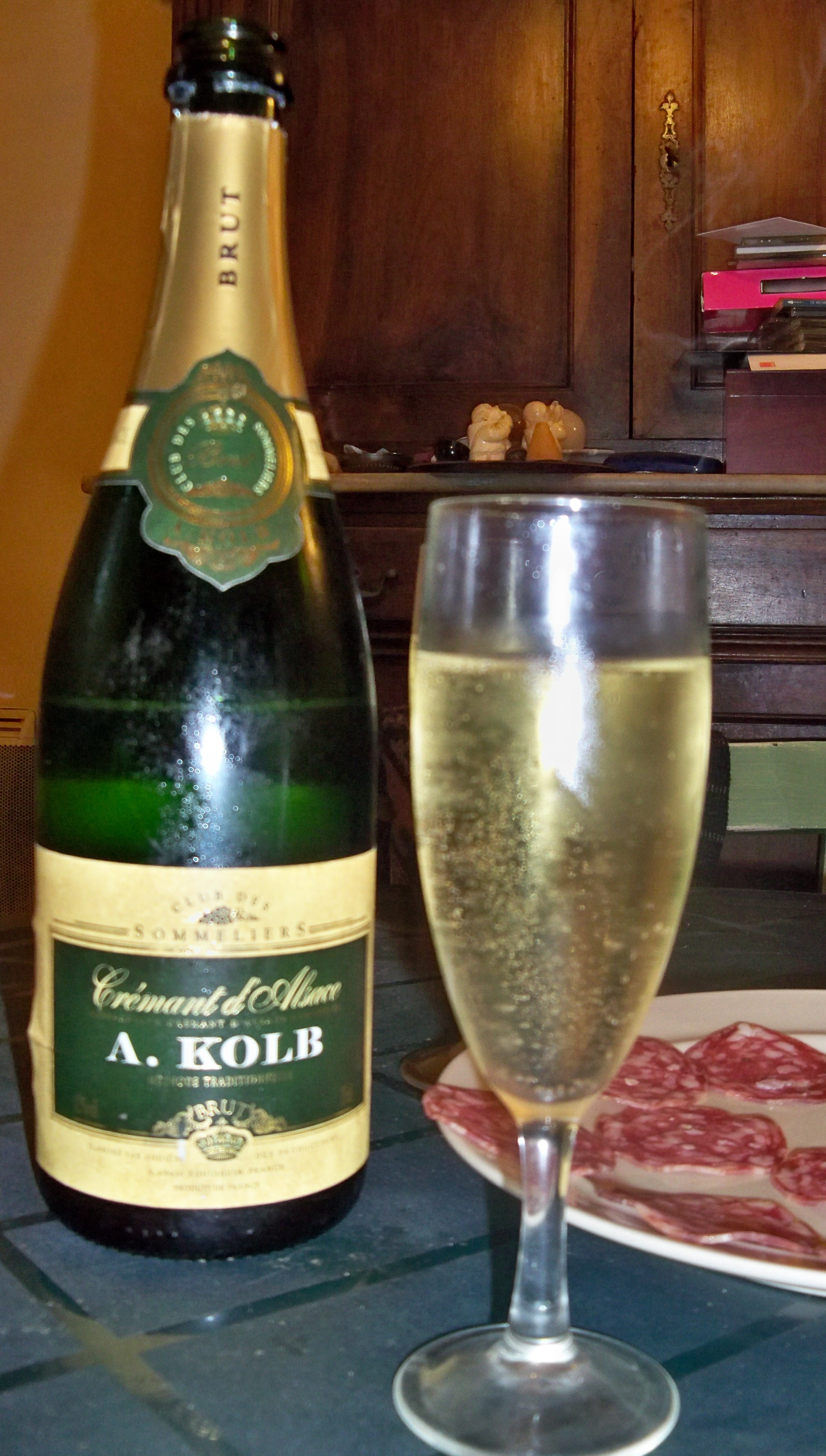
A Crémant d'Alsace.

Alsace is known for being the only French wine-growing region with a long practice in varietal labeling, which was a German tradition long before varietally labelled New World wines scored considerable export success. However, under appellation rules, not all varietal-sounding names on labels need to correspond to a single grape variety. Only one varietal label may be used on a wine, and a blend may not have more than one varietal name on the label.

| Label | Varieties allowed (if different) | AOC Alsace | AOC Alsace Grand Cru | VT & SGN | Comment |
|---|---|---|---|---|---|
Noble varieties
| Gewurztraminer | Gewürztraminer | X | X | X | Written without umlaut in French |
| Muscat | Muscat Blanc à Petits Grains; Muscat Rose à Petits Grains; Muscat Ottonell | X | X | X | Blends within these varieties are allowed for AOC Alsace, but only for specific AOC Grands Crus in certain cases. Not allowed for Grands Crus on Zotzenberg or Kaefferkopf. |
| Pinot gris | | X | X | X | Called Tokay d'Alsace before 1994 and later Tokay Pinot gris. The use of Tokay has been phased out to avoid confusion with wines from Tokaji in Hungary. From the 2007 vintage, Pinot gris is the only allowed designation. |
| Riesling | | X | X | X | |
Other single variety labels
| Chasselas; Gutedel | Chasselas | X | | | |
| Klevener de Heiligenstein | Savagnin Rose | X | | | Allowed for existing vineyards in Bourgheim, Gertwiller, Goxwiller, Heiligenstein and Obernai, with no replanting allowed outside the designation area after 2021. |
| Pinot noir | | X | | | For red and rosé wines |
| Sylvaner | | X | | | The variety Sylvaner - pure or mixed with Gewürztraminer, Pinot gris and Riesling - is allowed in wines from the Grand Cru vineyard Zotzenberg in Mittelbergheim since 2006, but not the varietal label. |
Labels allowing blends of several varieties
| Pinot; Klevner | Auxerrois blanc Pinot blanc Pinot gris Pinot noir, vinified as blanc de noirs | X | | | Pinot-labelled wines can be varietally pure or blends in any proportions of any of these varieties. Klevner-labelled wines are not supposed to be different. It has been claimed that the blending of Chardonnay into Pinot blanc-labeled wine, while against the AOC regulations, is quietly tolerated by the regulatory bodies. |
| Edelzwicker | Any variety allowed in AOC Alsace | X | | | Commonly blended from several varieties in any proportions. |
Labels outside the appellation regulations
| Gentil | Any variety allowed in AOC Alsace | | | | Unregulated older designation for blends that has been reintroduced. Consensus seems to be that a Gentil should have a minimum of 50% of the four noble grapes, and can therefore be thought of as a high-end Edelzwicker. |
Other varieties grown in Alsace
| Chardonnay | | | | | Allowed in Crémant d'Alsace, but not in AOC Alsace wines. Still Alsace wine from Chardonnay can only be sold as Vin de table according to regulations, but its blending into "Pinot blanc" is said to be quietly tolerated. |

== Non-AOC wines ==
Almost all Alsace wine is produced under one of the region's three AOC designations—Alsace, Alsace Grand Cru and Crémant d'Alsace. Unlike most other French wine regions, there exists no Vin de pays designation for Alsace. This means that wines that do not qualify for AOC status have to be sold as simple Vin de table de France. This happens in some instances when producers wish to use other grape varieties in their wine, like Domaine Zind-Humbrecht which sells its cuvée Zind, a blend of 65% Chardonnay and 35% Auxerrois.

== Industry structure ==
Up to 2,000 growers bottle their own wine, but more than 80% of the wine is produced by 175 producers, including many winemaking cooperatives. Even the largest winemaking companies/négociants in Alsace tend to be family-owned. In 2001, approximately 45% of Alsace wine was made by cooperatives.

== Producers ==
Some of the best known producers include Maison Trimbach, Domaine Zind-Humbrecht, Hugel & Fils, Léon Beyer, Weinbach, Josmeyer and Marcel Deiss. Many of the larger houses, such as Hugel, sell both wines from their own vineyards and market wines they have produced from purchased grapes, i.e., operate as négociant. Producers calling themselves "Domaine", such as Zind-Humbrecht, are supposed to only use grapes from their own vineyards. There are also several winemaking cooperatives, some of which have a rather good reputation.

== Route des Vins d'Alsace ==
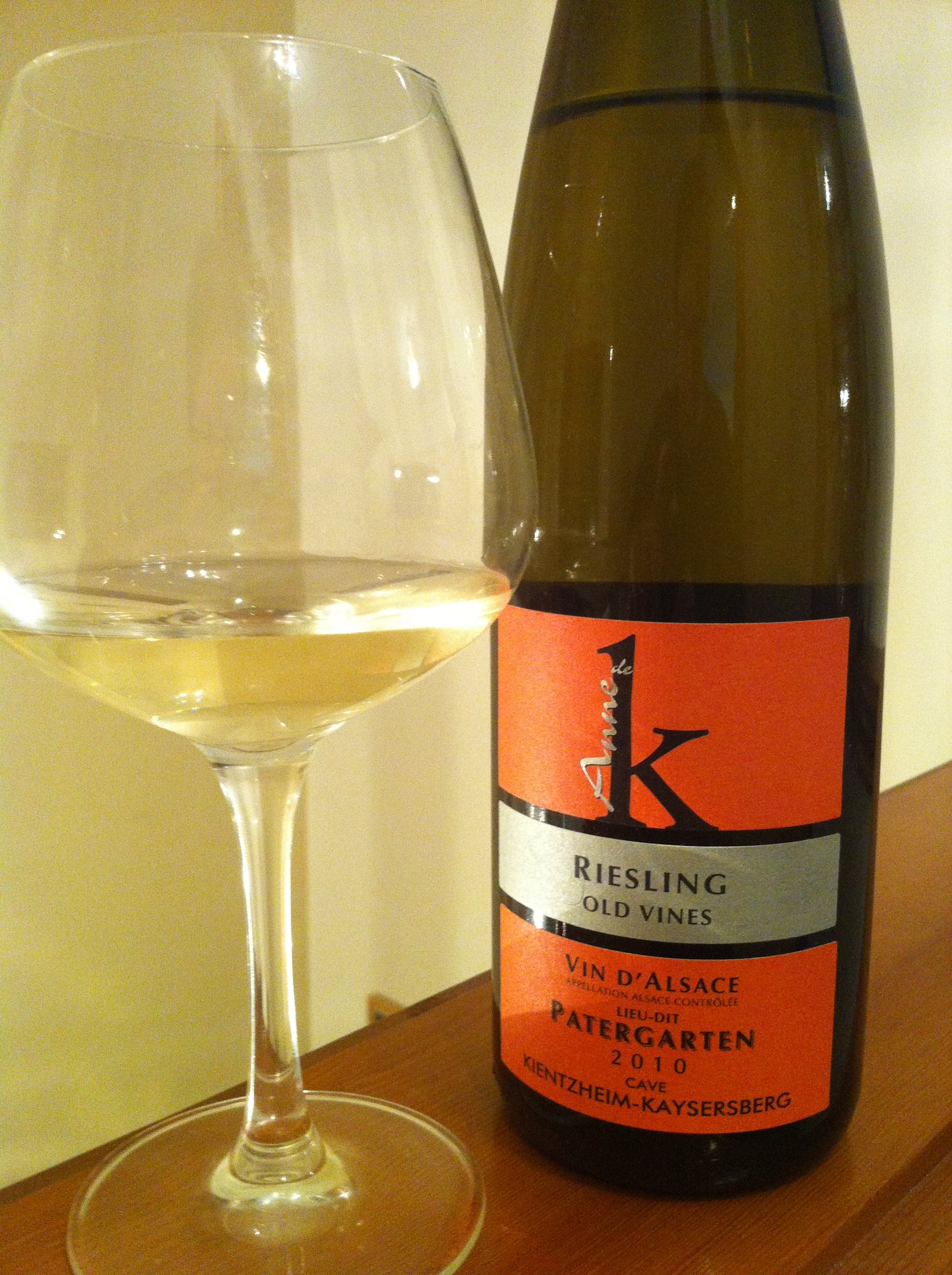
An Alsatian Riesling from the lieu-dit (vineyard) of Patergarten made by the co-op serving the communes of Kientzheim and Kayserberg.

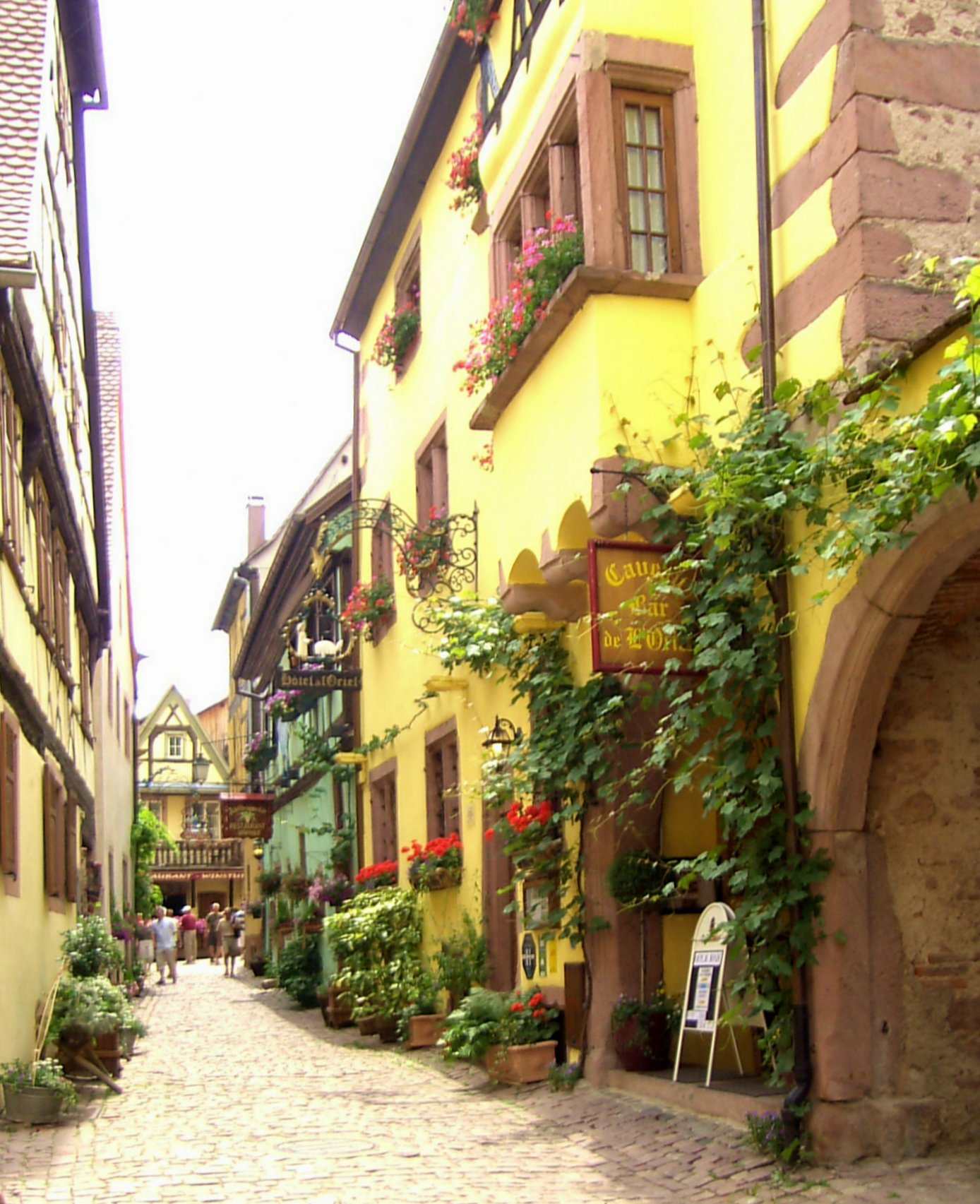
The village of Riquewihr is one of the stops on the Route des Vins

The Route des Vins d'Alsace (Wine route of Alsace) is an approximately 170-kilometre-long (110 mi) road, crossing the main wine producing areas of the region. From north to south, the following 67 communes crossed by the Route are:

- Marlenheim
- Wangen
- Westhoffen
- Traenheim
- Bergbieten
- Dangolsheim
- Soultz-les-Bains
- Avolsheim
- Molsheim
- Rosheim
- Boersch
- Ottrott
- Obernai
- Bernardswiller
- Heiligenstein
- Barr
- Mittelbergheim
- Andlau
- Itterswiller
- Nothalten
- Blienschwiller
- Dambach-la-Ville
- Scherwiller
- Châtenois
- Kintzheim
- Orschwiller
- Saint-Hippolyte
- Rodern
- Rorschwihr
- Bergheim
- Ribeauvillé
- Hunawihr
- Zellenberg
- Riquewihr
- Beblenheim
- Mittelwihr
- Bennwihr
- Sigolsheim
- Kientzheim
- Kaysersberg
- Ammerschwihr
- Ingersheim
- Niedermorschwihr
- Turckheim
- Colmar
- Wintzenheim
- Wettolsheim
- Eguisheim
- Husseren-les-Châteaux
- Voegtlinshoffen
- Obermorschwihr
- Hattstatt
- Gueberschwihr
- Pfaffenheim
- Rouffach
- Westhalten
- Soultzmatt
- Orschwihr
- Bergholtz
- Guebwiller
- Soultz
- Wuenheim
- Cernay
- Vieux-Thann
- Thann
