= Rouge d'Ottrott =

French wine

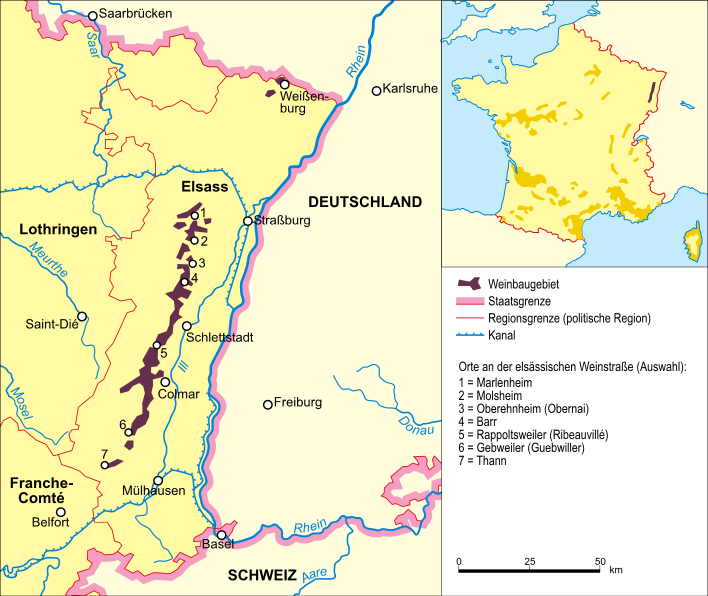
Map of Alsace with the location of the wine-growing region

Rouge d'Ottrott is a Pinot Noir red wine produced in the commune of Ottrott, in the Bas-Rhin. It is a geographical denomination within the registered designation of origin Alsace AOC, which mainly produces white wines. It is recommended drunk at 10°-16 °C.

== See also ==
- Alsace Grand Cru AOC
- Crémant d'Alsace AOC
