= St. Marx Abbey =

Convent in Haut-Rhin, France

Coordinates: 48°0′26″N 7°15′1″E

St. Marx Abbey or St. Mark's Abbey (German: Kloster St. Marx; French: Saint Marc) was a Benedictine nunnery in Gueberschwihr (Geberschweier) in Alsace, founded in about 1105. Since 1845 it has been the principal house of the Sisters of St. Joseph of St. Marc, rebuilt in 1852 after a disastrous fire.

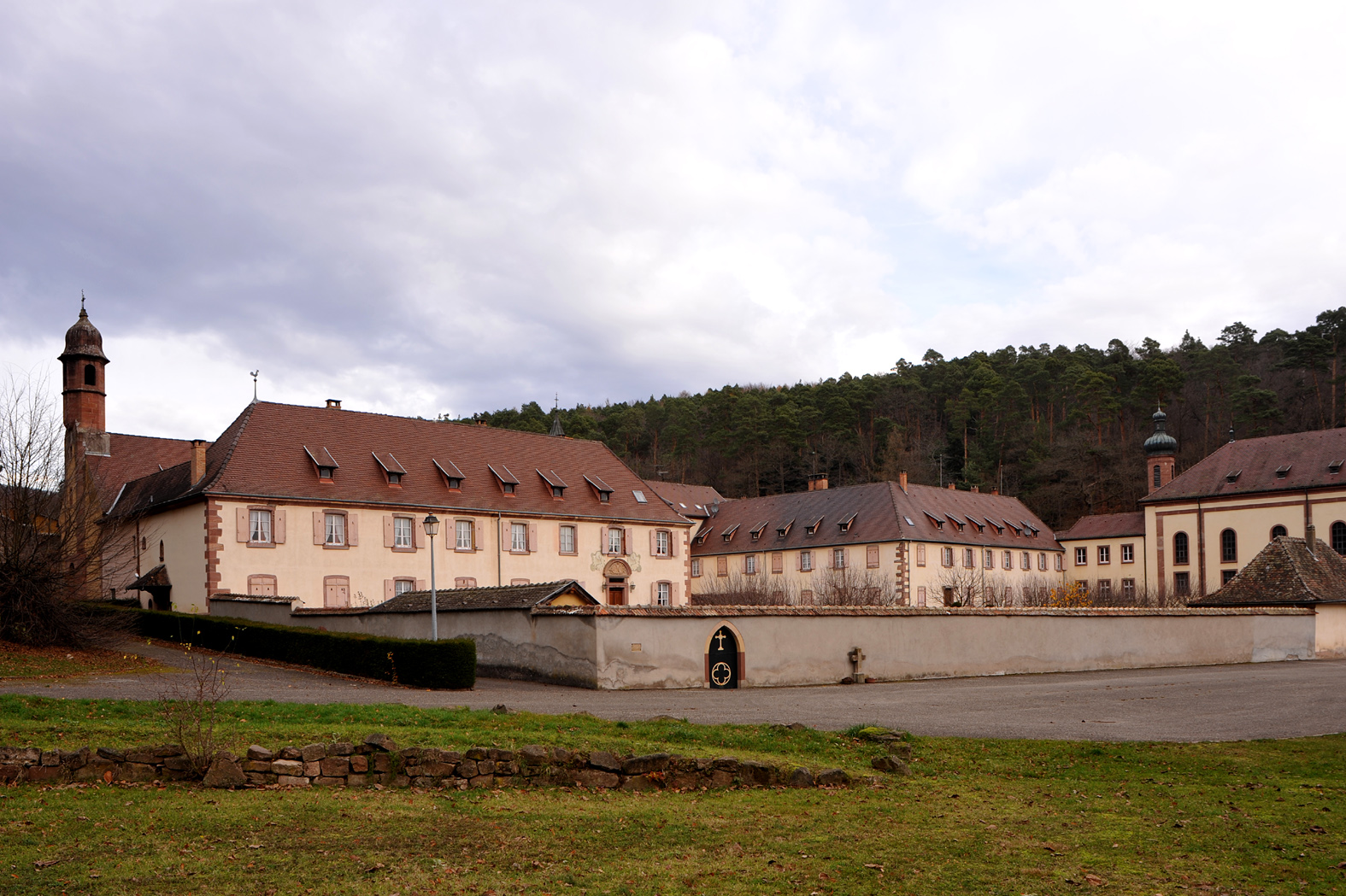
Couvent Saint-Marc

== Benedictines ==
The nunnery was under the supervision of the Benedictine St. George's Abbey in the Black Forest, of which until the 18th century it was a priory.

Before the foundation of the nunnery there had been a community of monks on the site, which came to an end after a serious fire. Abbot Theoger of St. George's (1088-1119) replaced it with the nunnery, which was made subordinate to St. George's in 1184, according to a deed of Pope Lucius III. In about 1400 a monk of St. George's was mentioned as the prior here, as were possessions of the nunnery in Geberschweier and Osenbach.

In 1710 a beer brewery was built there.

In 1754 the priory was transferred from St. George's to Ebersmünster Abbey in Alsace.

In 1845 the premises, empty since the French Revolution, were used by Abbé Pierre Paul Blanck to establish a women's community under the Benedictine Rule combining the veneration of the Holy Sacrament with manual labour and the care of orphans. The buildings burnt down in 1852 and the difficulties facing the new community were so great that it seemed impossible for it to survive. Against all odds it did continue and was constituted as a formal order on 9 October 1868 with the election and appointment of Sister Maria Xavier as superior.

At the end of World War I the German sisters were expelled from Alsace and obliged to look for new premises in Germany, which in 1919 they found in the former St. Trudpert's Abbey in Münstertal. These are now the Sisters of St. Joseph of St. Trudpert.

The French community continues as the Sisters of St. Joseph of St. Marc.

== Sources ==
- Wollasch, H.-J., Die Anfänge des Klosters St. Georgen im Schwarzwald. Zur Ausbildung der geschichtlichen Eigenart eines Klosters innerhalb der Hirsauer Reform (Forschungen zur oberrheinischen Landesgeschichte 14), Freiburg i.Br. 1964
- Wollasch, H.-J., Die Benediktinerabtei St. Georgen im Schwarzwald und ihre Beziehungen zu Klöstern westlich des Rheins, in: 900 Jahre Stadt St. Georgen im Schwarzwald 1084–1984. Festschrift, publ. by the municipality of St. Georgen, St. Georgen 1984, pp. 45–61
