= SSJ =

SSJ may refer to the following:

- The IATA airport code for Sandnessjøen Airport, Stokka in Sandnessjøen, Nordland, Norway
- Siervas de San Jose, a religious congregation of the Roman Catholic Church
- Sisters of Saint Joseph, a Catholic religious order
- Soban Singh Jeena University, in Uttarakhand, India
- Stranka srpskog jedinstva, a political party that existed in Serbia from 1993 until 2007.
- Sukhoi Superjet 100, a fly-by-wire regional jet
- Super Saiyan (Sūpā Saiya-Jin) from Dragon Ball Z
