= Trimbach =

Trimbach may refer to:

- Maison Trimbach, a winery located in Ribeauvillé, Alsace, France
- Trimbach, Switzerland, a municipality in the district of Gösgen in the canton of Solothurn in Switzerland
- Trimbach, Bas-Rhin, a commune in the Bas-Rhin department of the Grand Est region of France
