= Crémant d'Alsace =

Sparkling Wine of France

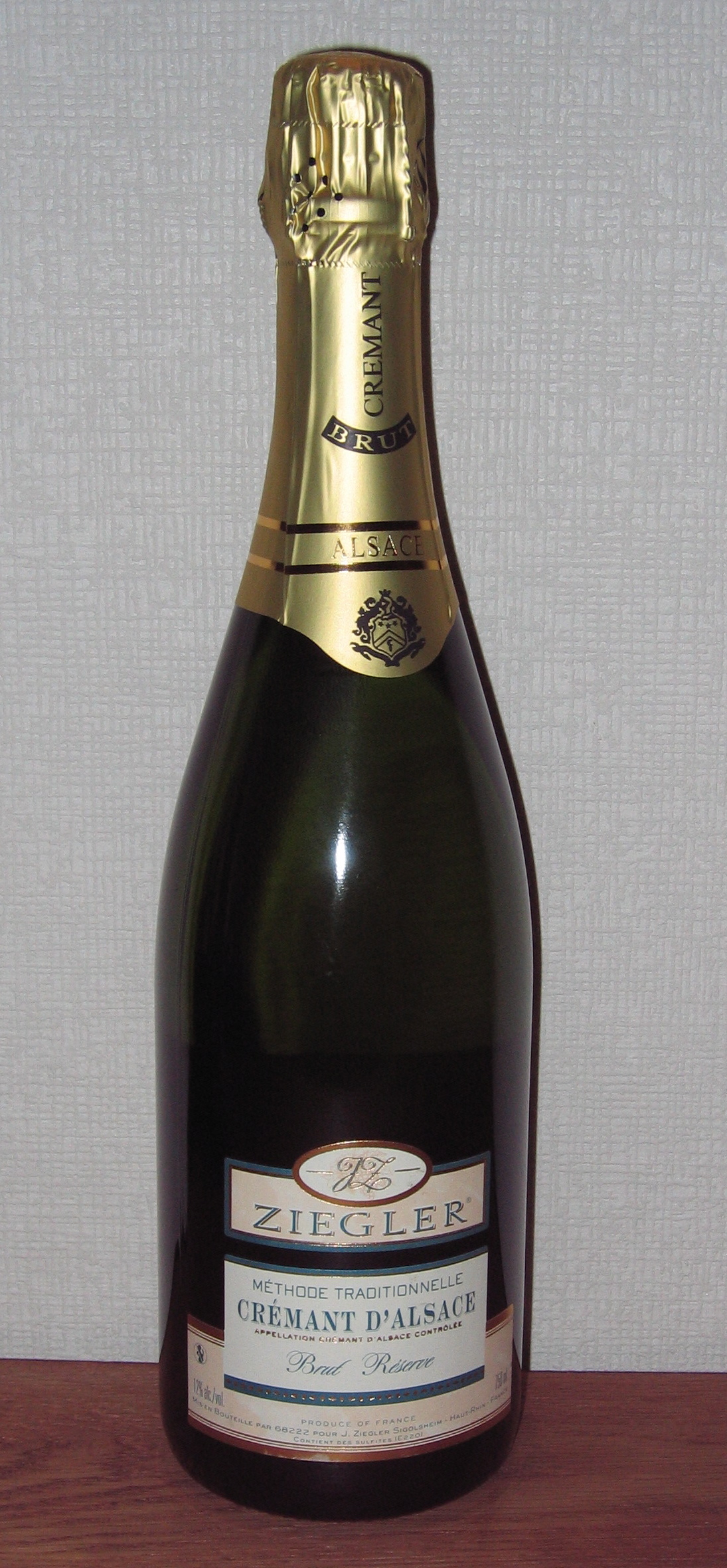
Crémant d'Alsace

Crémant d'Alsace (French pronunciation: [kʁemɑ̃ dalzas]) is an Appellation d'Origine Contrôlée for sparkling wines made in the Alsace wine region of France. Produced since 1900, the Crémant d'Alsace AOC was recognized in 1976 by the INAO and the designation Crémant regulated by the European Parliament in 1996.

Crémant d'Alsace is usually made of some blend among pinot blanc, pinot gris, pinot noir, riesling, auxerrois and chardonnay. Crémant d'Alsace rosé, while rare, is made of pinot noir.

The method of production is identical with that of champagne. In comparison to champagne, crémant d'Alsace is usually at a lower price levels; crémant d'Alsace cannot age in cellar as long as champagne (5 years maximum). In 2009, 31 million bottles were produced.

== History ==
The Alsatian vineyard is one of the oldest ones of France. Gregory of Tours praised Marlenheim's vineyard in 589. There were 108 wine-producing villages in 800, 160 in 900 and 430 in 1400. By this time, Alsatian wine, red or white, was one of the most famous wines of Europe and one of the most expensive.

Many wars, unfavorable economical circumstances and keeping of obsolete laws led through the following centuries Alsatian wine next to the depths. This situation recovered after World War I.

Just before 1900, while Alsace was part of the German Empire, some Champagne winemakers like Hommel in Ribeauvillé, Dirler in Bergholtz, Cosse in Pfastatt or Vix Barra in Schiltigheim settled into Alsace to make sparkling wine and got around customs rights upon export towards Germany.

Julien Dopff au Moulin from Riquewihr has been the first Alsatian winemaker to adapt the méthode champenoise after attending a demonstration during the Exposition Universelle in Paris. He started to sell the Champagne Dopff after a two years training period in Épernay by proceeding to a second fermentation in bottles.

After World War I and Alsace's return into France, the transposition of the French 1905-law about designation of origin forbade the use of the word Champagne. The distinction between both products came by Pierre Hussherr, an earlier manager of Wolfberger, who retrieved the term Crémant, then obsolete in Champagne. On 4 July 1975, a law allowed the word "Crémant" only for sparkling wines under AOC-rules. After that, Crémant de Loire and Crémant de Bourgogne were defined by decrees.

On 24 August 1976, the AOC Crémant d'Alsace was defined by a decree too. On 21 June 1996, the European Parliament consolidated the denomination Crémant, then used in France and Luxembourg, making clear that it must be a quality sparkling wine following strict production rules and having been named Crémant before July 1986.

== Geography ==
Crémant d'Alsace is produced in north-eastern France, in the region Alsace, nearly in the whole Alsatian vineyard but mainly in Barr, Bennwihr, Eguisheim. Ingersheim, Riquewihr, Wintzenheim and Andolsheim.

=== Geology and orography ===
Alsace plain occupies the south part of the Upper Rhine Plain, which formed from a collapse during the Oligocene and is followed since the Miocene by the river Rhine. The vineyard stays on the lower slopes of the Vosges Mountains, on the fault zone of the graben, covered by alluvial fans of the many rivers and creeks flowing from the nearby heights. This explains the variety of the subsurface materials and their succession forming a true mosaic: limestones, granites, shales, gneiss or sandstones.

Mainly, the upper part of the slopes of the subvosgian hills consists of old rocks: plutons and metamorphic rocks like granite, gneiss or slate. Vine-planted parcels are rather steep and climb up to 478 m height (near Osenbach). The lower part of the slopes consists of layers of limestones or marls covered by loess where the slope is rather smooth.

Finally, the plain consists of a thick layer of alluvium deposited by the Rhine (silt and gravels). This zone is very more fertile than the two previous with an important aquifer mainly close to the surface (less than 5 m deep): the Upper Rhine aquifer.

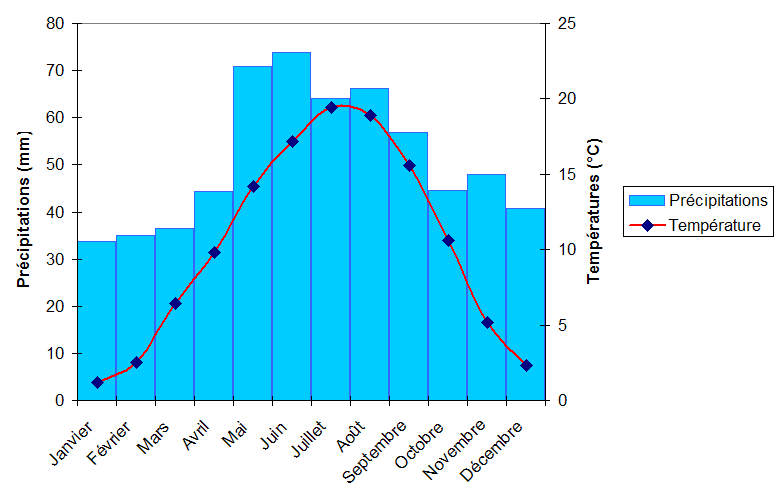
Means of temperature and precipitation near Strasbourg (1949-2001)

=== Climatology ===
On the western side, the Vosges Mountains shield the Alsatian vineyards from wind and rain. Dominating western winds lose their moisture on the eastern side of the Vosges and arrive as foehn winds into the Alsace plain. The precipitation mean in Alsace is the lowest of all French vineyards and Colmar one of the dryest towns of France.

Consequently, the climate is more temperate than expected at this latitude: the annual mean temperature is about 1.5 °C higher. The climate is semi-continental and dry with hot springs, sunny and dry summers, long autumns and cold winters.

== Wine making ==
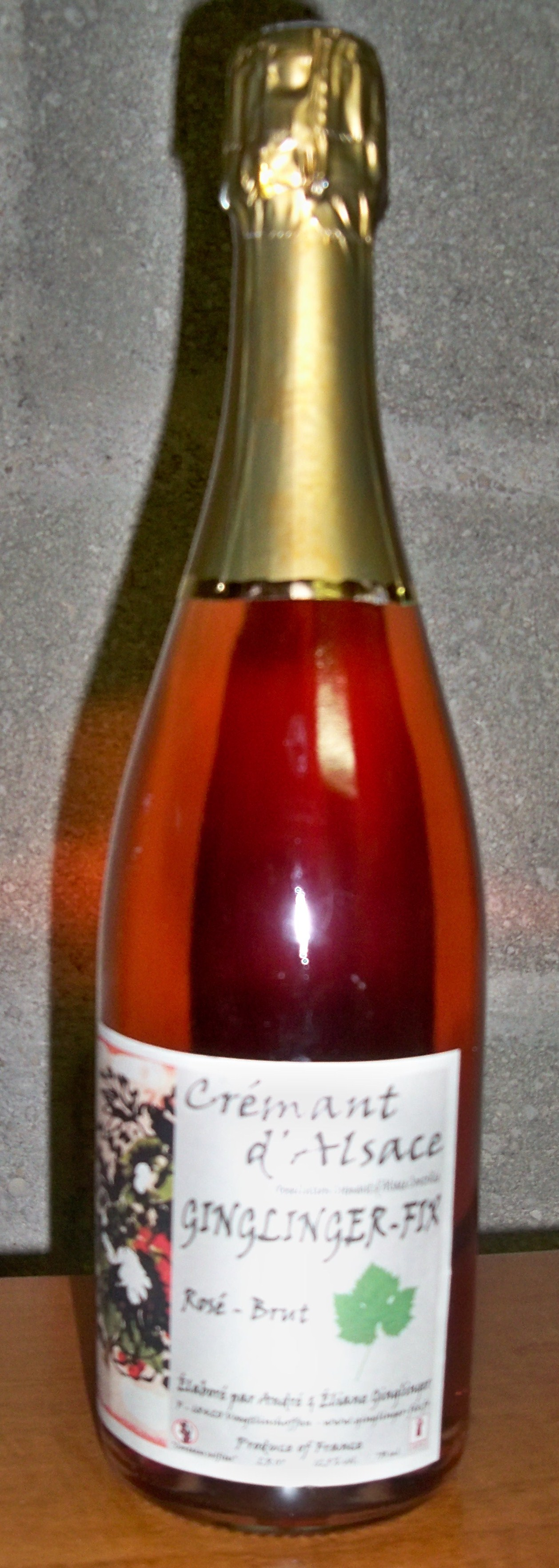
Crémant d'Alsace rosé

The grapes for Crémant d'Alsace are harvested many days before grapes for the other Alsace AOCs. As with Champagne, grapes must be manually harvested. Grapes come from varieties grown within the AOC Alsace area. The allowed varieties are limited to riesling, pinot blanc, pinot noir, pinot gris, auxerrois blanc and chardonnay. For rosé wines, only pinot noir is allowed.

The AOC Crémant d'Alsace is elaborated according to the methods used for Champagne elaboration.

In 2004, the grape harvest for Crémant d'Alsace elaboration represented 214,946 hectolitres, showing a rise of 35.6% compared with the mean of the five latest years. In 2005, it represented 273,733 hectolitres, a new rise of 27.3% in one year and about 36.5 million bottles. In 2006, Crémant d'Alsace represented the fourth of all AOC Alsace designations and gathered 500 winemakers together. A tenth of its production was exported, mainly into Belgium, Germany, Denmark, United States, Sweden, Switzerland and Netherlands (decreasingly ordered). In 2008, it represented 248,000 hectolitres, that was 5% more than in 2007.

From less than 1 million bottles in 1979, the annual production of Crémant d'Alsace grew to 33 million bottles in 2009 (22% of all AOC Alsace wines) while sales climbed from 2.2 million bottles in 1982 to 30 million bottles in 2009.

== Wines and gastronomy ==
Wines designated Crémant d'Alsace must be bottled in the production area. The bottles have the same shape as Champagne bottles. Wines are labelled according to their make-up: blanc de blancs (white wine from white grapes), blanc de noirs (white wine from black grapes), brut (very dry), millésimé (vintage wine), rosé, sigillé (sealed, promoted by the Confrérie Saint-Étienne d'Alsace). Varietal labelling is allowed if any of the allowed varieties is exclusively used (blanc de noirs and rosé are inevitably varietal).

Crémant d'Alsace is recommended served between 5 and 7 °C in Champagne stemware. It can be offered as apéritif. It can also be served during a whole meal. It suits seafoods and cheese.
