= Maison Trimbach =

Winery in Ribeauvillé, Alsace, France

Coordinates: 48.195°N 7.325°E

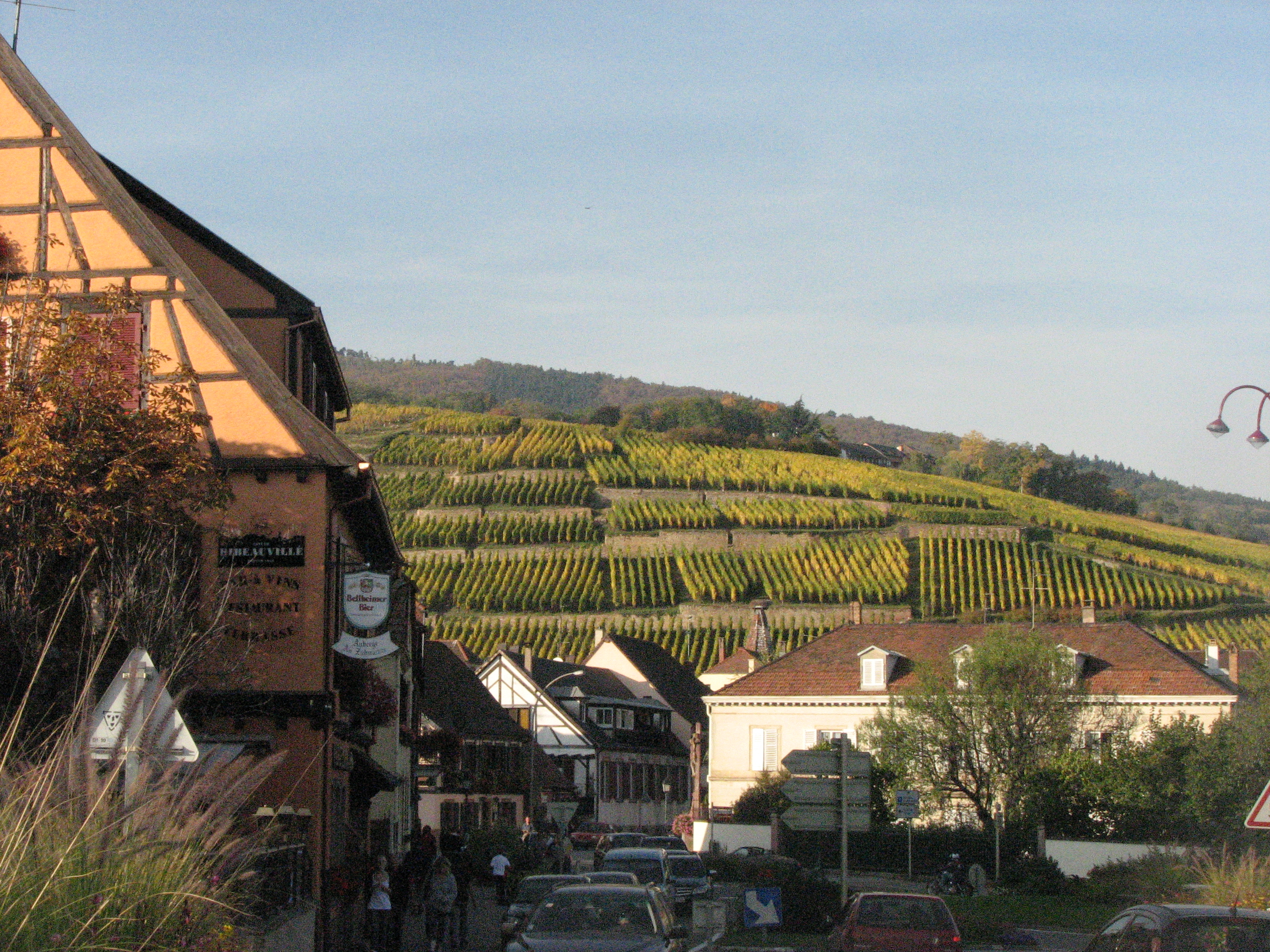
The Geisberg Grand Cru vineyard, located just outside the village of Ribeauvillé, is a source of some of Trimbach's best wines. The Trimbach winery (not visible in the image) is located at the foot of this vineyard.

Maison Trimbach (F. E. Trimbach) is a winery located in Ribeauvillé, Alsace, France. Trimbach produces many of its high-end wines from its own vineyards, but also operates a négociant business which buys grapes to produce additional wines. The company is especially noted for its high-end dry Riesling wines produced in a traditional Alsace wine style.

== History ==
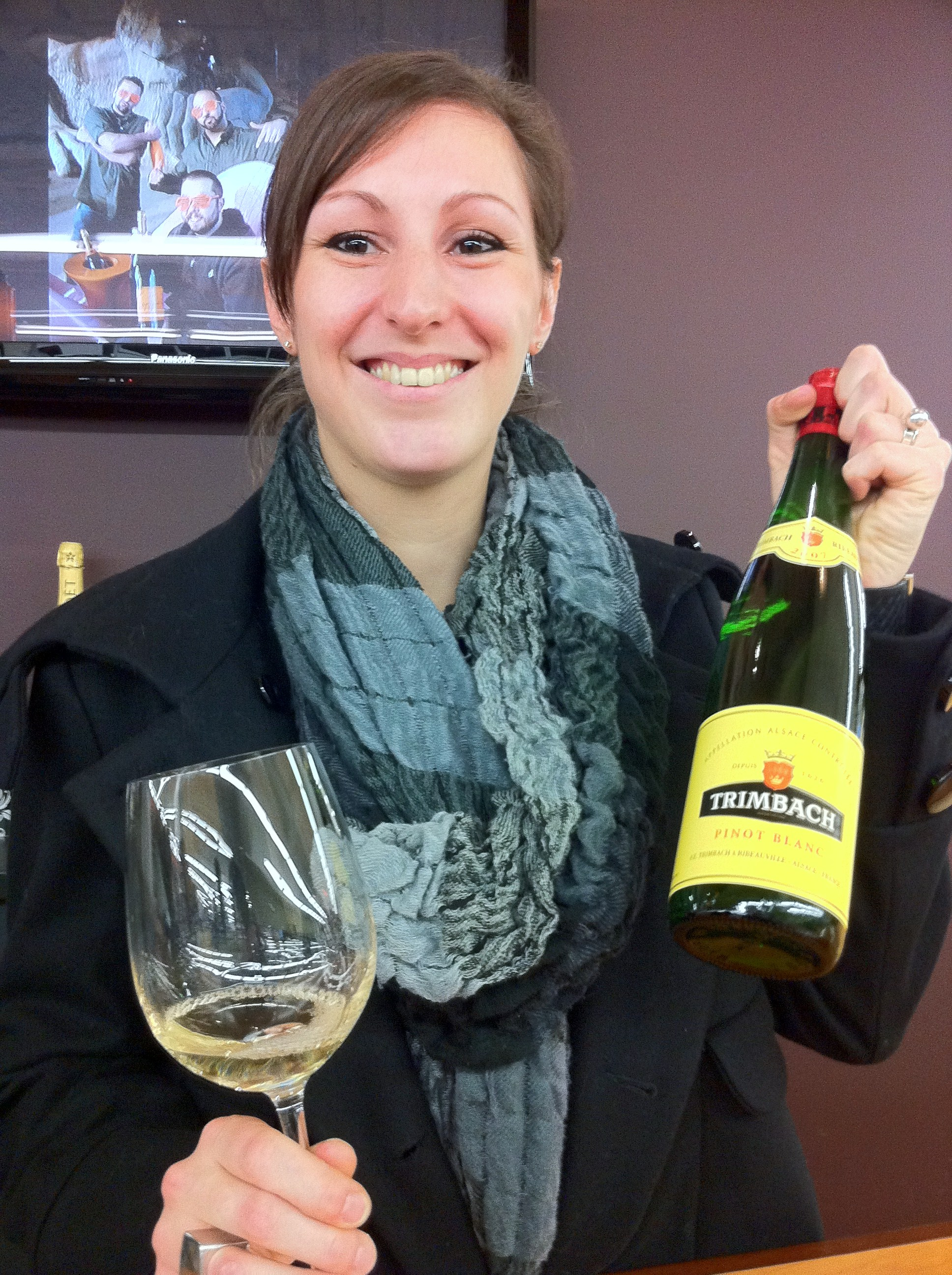
Anne Trimbach of the winemaking family.

The company was founded in Riquewihr in 1626 by Jean Trimbach from Sainte Marie aux Mines. In the 1840s, the winery was moved to Hunawihr, and just after World War I it was moved to Ribeauvillé.

== Wines ==
The most famous of the wines is the Clos Ste Hune, a dry Riesling produced from a special plot inside the Rosacker Grand Cru vineyard.
