= Domaine Zind-Humbrecht =

French winery

Coordinates: 48.0838°N 7.2957°E

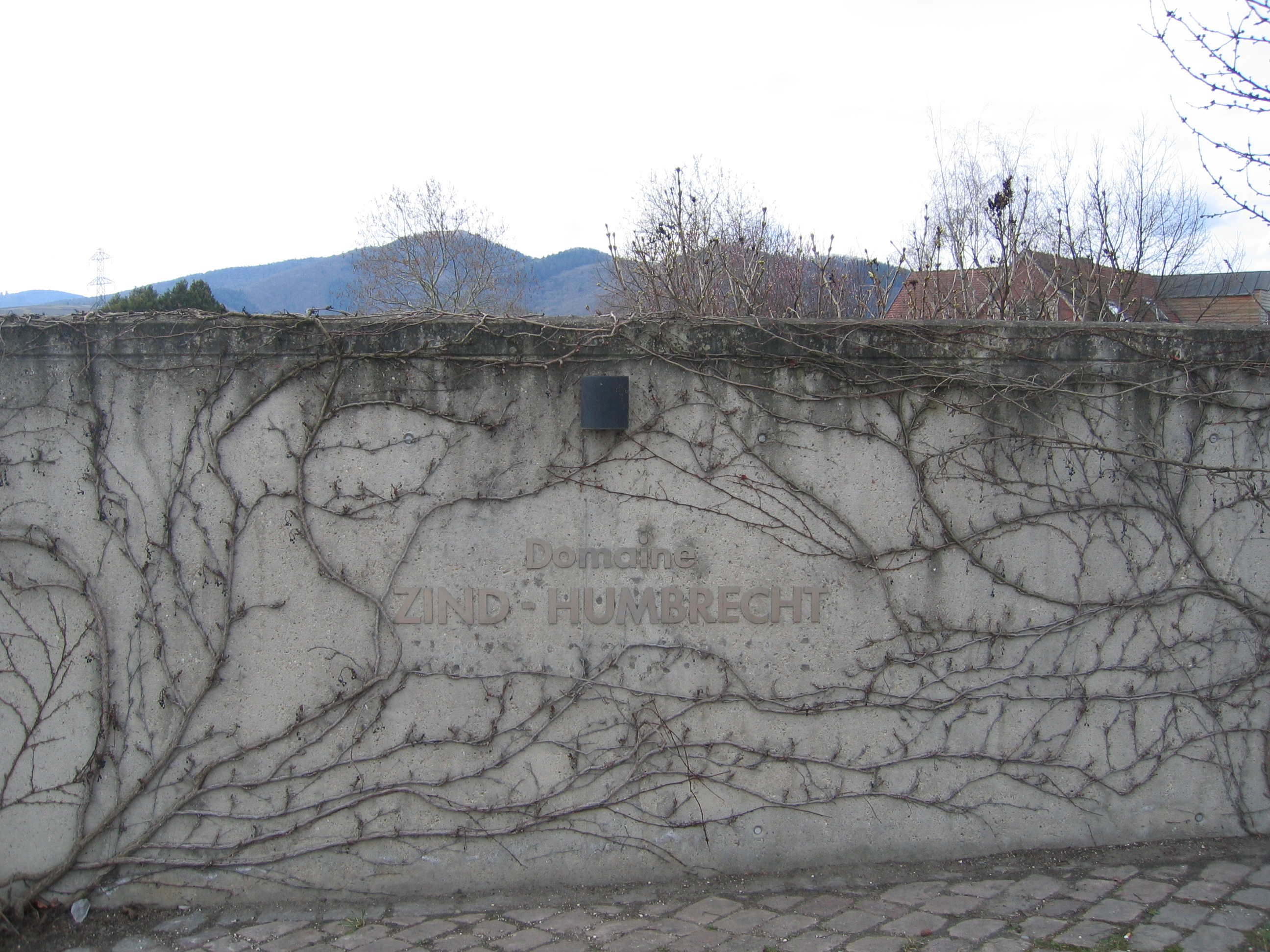
Outside the entrance of Domaine Zind-Humbrecht

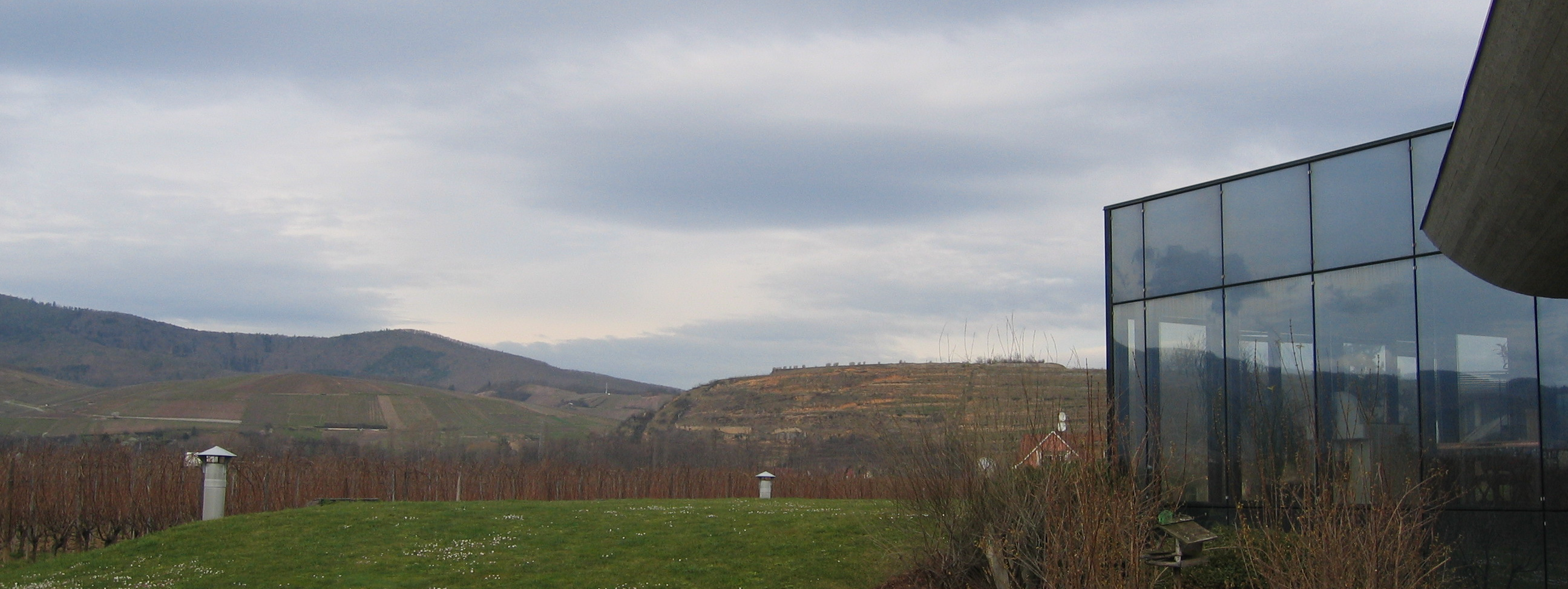
View from outside the tasting room of Domaine Zind-Humbrecht. The domaine has many vineyard holdings in the surrounding area, and some of them are visible from the tasting room.

Domaine Zind-Humbrecht is a winery located in Turckheim, Alsace, France.

The domaine was created in 1959, following the marriage of Léonard Humbrecht to Geneviève Zind. The Humbrecht family has a history of winegrowing since 1620. The domaine is currently mostly managed by Léonard's son Olivier Humbrecht, who was the first Frenchman to qualify as Master of Wine.

== Vineyards ==
As a domaine, Zind-Humbrecht only produces wines from its own vineyards.

The total vineyard holdings of around 40 hectares (99 acres) include:

- Grand Cru vineyards:
  - Rangen (in Thann), 5.5 hectares (14 acres)
  - Brand (in Turckheim), 2.4 hectares (5.9 acres)
  - Hengst (in Wintzenheim), 1.4 hectares (3.5 acres)
  - Goldert (in Gueberschwihr), 0.9 hectares (2.2 acres)
- Other vineyards:
  - Rotenberg (in Wintzenheim), 1.8 hectares (4.4 acres)
  - Clos Häuserer (in Wintzenheim), 1.2 hectares (3.0 acres)
  - Herrenweg (in Turkheim), 11.5 hectares (28 acres)
  - Clos Jebsal (in Turkheim), 1.3 hectares (3.2 acres)
  - Heimbourg (in Turkheim), 4 hectares (9.9 acres)
  - Clos Windsbuhl (in Hunawihr), 5.2 hectares (13 acres)

Zind-Humbrecht typically bottles also most of the wines from the non-Grand Cru vineyards under their lieu dit designation (vineyard name), rather than as Alsace wine with just a varietal designation.

== Wine style ==
Domaine Zind-Humbrecht took a pioneering role in producing Alsace wines in concentrated, fruity style using low yields (around 30-40 hectoliter per hectare) and biodynamic viticulture. Some of these wines did have considerable residual sugar (without being intended as dessert wines), which at that time was unusual for Alsace wines.

The level of residual sugar in Zind-Humbrecht wines may vary considerably between vintages, and acceptance of such variations is part of the biodynamic philosophy.

In order to guide the consumer to what they may expect inside the bottle, Zind-Humbrecht introduced a sweetness index on the labels of their bottles from the 2001 vintage. This index is a number from 1 to 5, which is found in fine print as "Indice 1" to "Indice 5" on the label, typically next to the alcoholic content. The index is assigned based on an overall impression of the wine, and has the following meaning:

- Indice 1: analytically dry or tasting dry. (This would correspond to the "classical Alsace style".)
- Indice 2: not analytically dry, but the sweetness is not apparent on the palate
- Indice 3: a semi-sweet wine
- Indice 4: a sweet wine; these wines may correspond to Vendange Tardive wines from many other producers.
- Indice 5: high sweetness, corresponding to a Vendange Tardive in richness but with less noble rot character. These will be wines which Zind-Humbrecht could have bottled as Vendange Tardive, but have elected not to because of their style.
