= Sisters of St. Joseph (disambiguation) =

The Sisters of St. Joseph is a Catholic congregation of women, founded in 1650. It may also refer to:

- Religious Hospitallers of St. Joseph, founded in La Flèche, France in 1636 by Jerome le Royer de la Dauversiere and Marie de la Ferre
- Sisters of St. Joseph of Cluny, founded 1807 in Cluny, France
- The Sisters of St. Joseph of Peace, founded in 1884 in Nottingham, England
- Sisters of St Joseph of the Sacred Heart, founded in 1866 in South Australia
- Sisters of Saint Joseph of Saint-Marc, founded in 1845 in Alsace, France
- Sisters of St. Joseph of the Third Order of St. Francis, founded in 1901 in Wisconsin, United States
- Sisters of St. Joseph of the Apparition, founded in 1832 in Gaillac, France
