= Sisters of Saint Joseph of Saint-Marc =

Roman Catholic congregarion in Alsace, France

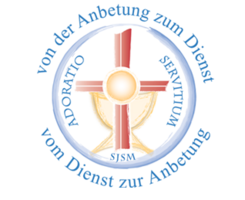
The official seal of the Sisters of Saint Joseph of Saint Marc

The Sisters of St. Joseph of Saint-Marc (SJSM) are a Roman Catholic congregation of religious sisters, based in the town of Saint-Marc, Alsace, France.

== History ==
The origins of the Congregation lie in their foundation in 1845 by the Abbé Pierre Paul Blanck (1809 - ) in the remaining buildings of St. Mark Abbey (Alemannic German: St. Marx) in Gueberschwihr (Geberschweier) in the canton of Rouffach, Alsace, of a women's community under the Benedictine Rule who accepted the Adoration of the Blessed Sacrament, the manual labor and the care of orphans. The buildings burnt down in 1852 and the difficulties facing the new community were so great that it seemed impossible for it to survive. Against all odds it did continue and was formally constituted as a Congregation on 9 October 1868, with the election and appointment of Sister Maria Xavier as Superior General.

The German Sisters were forced to leave Alsace after the end of World War I and to seek new premises in Germany, which they found in the former St. Trudpert's monastery in Münstertal. The first Sisters moved there in 1919 and the following year they established a separate province of St. Trudpert within the Congregation. Their first ecclesiastical supervisor there was the Rev. Dean Willibald Strohmeyer (1877 - 1945), pastor of St. Trudpert, who was appointed in 1924. In 1925 the community began an ambitious programme of construction works not only on the monastic buildings but also on hospitals and other medical facilities. In 1926 the first Sisters left for Cleveland, Ohio, in America.

During the economic collapse of Germany in 1929, the fraud and bankruptcy of the Freiburger Bank brought the community to the brink of ruin. All building works were suspended and the Sisters were reduced for years to a life of great poverty. The Sisters were permitted to remain in their premises during World War II, because they offered shelter to refugees and the homeless. Many Sisters worked in military hospitals. Unfortunately, in 1945 Willibald Strohmeyer, head of the Congregation, was murdered by the Nazis, having served 36 years as pastor of the town. A memorial chapel now stands on the site of his murder.

After the end of the war the community at last found itself able to resume the interrupted renovations halted by the Great Depression. A convent chapel was dedicated in 1965.

In 1970 the German province separated to become a fully independent Congregation. They lasted as such until 1997, when they chose to merge back with the original Congregation now headquartered in Colmar, France. The congregation now has four Provinces around the world. Today the Sisters run schools, leprosaria, tuberculosis wards and homes for the dying.

== Provinces ==
=== France ===
The French province, which has its provincial motherhouse in Saint-Marc, has 18 communities, with Sisters from France, Germany, India, Madagascar and Congo.

=== Germany ===
The Province of St. Trudpert is made up of 16 different communities. One of these communities is in Tanzania, Africa. The Sisters are of German and Indian nationalities.

=== St. Joseph Province, India ===
In 1960 the first Indian women were admitted as postulants in the German novitiate. In 1974 the first five native Sisters returned to India and began mission work in Madhya Pradesh. In the next year a house of the Congregation was opened in Sanawad and a novitiate was opened. By the end of the 1970s four other houses had been opened in India, at Palakkad in Kerala, Bhikkangaon and Nalvat, both in Madhya Pradesh and at Haresmara in Orissa. The Indian communities were established as St. Joseph Province, with its motherhouse at Indore, Madhya Pradesh, in 1989.

There are 22 communities of Sisters in different States of India.

=== Kerala, India ===
The province of Sanjo in Vengoor in the state of Kerala in South India has 21 communities in different states of India.

=== Missions ===
There are two communities in the United States and another two in Ukraine. There is also a community in the Philippines.

== Sources ==
- Sisters of St. Joseph of Saint-Marc
- St. Trudpert convent website (in German)
