= Riquewihr =

Commune in Grand Est, France

Riquewihr Richewihr (Alsatian)
- Commune
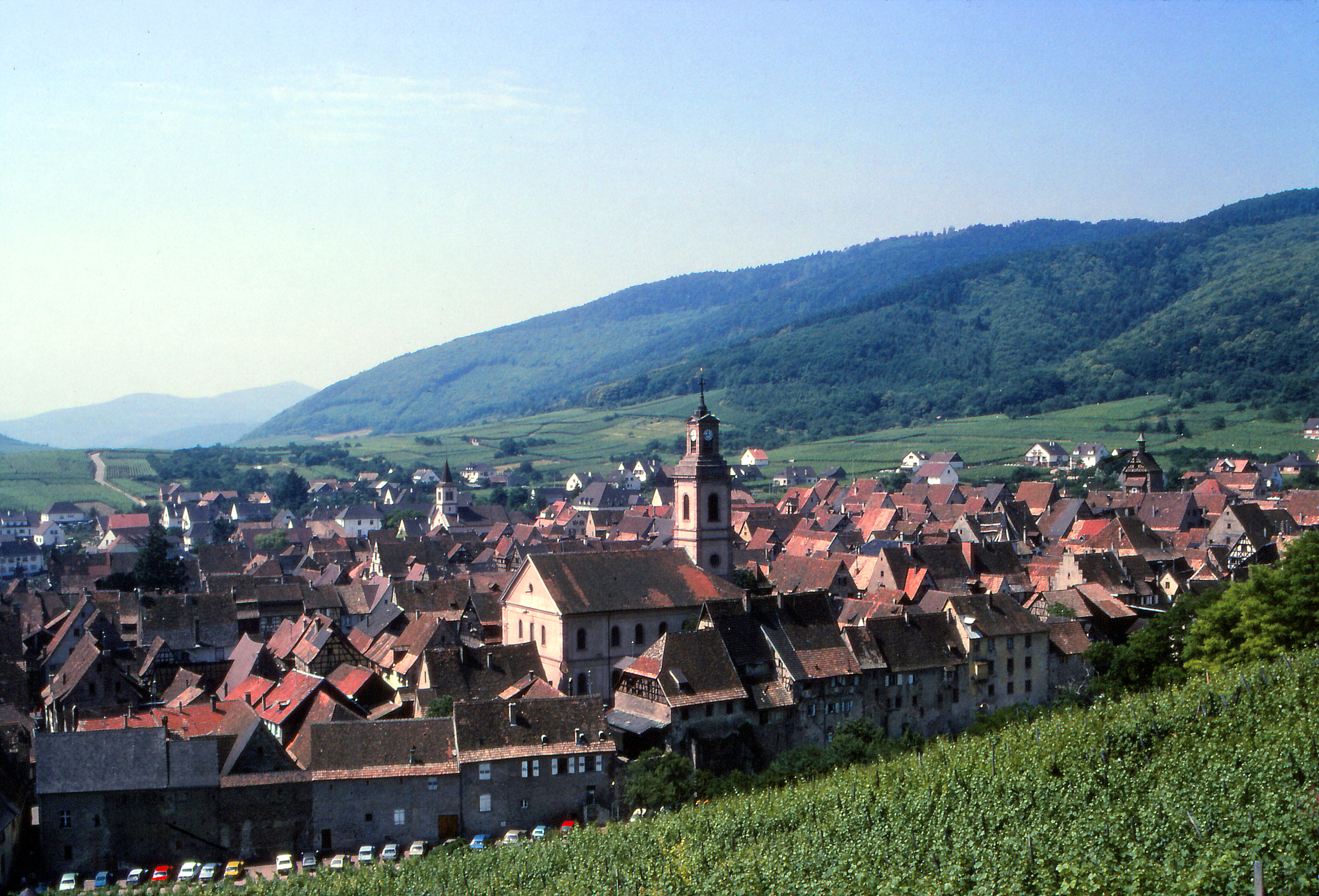
- Main street

- Coat of arms
- Location of Riquewihr
- Location within France Location within Grand Est
- Coordinates: 48°10′02″N 7°17′52″E
- Country: France
- Region: Grand Est
- Department: Haut-Rhin
- Arrondissement: Colmar-Ribeauvillé
- Canton: Sainte-Marie-aux-Mines
- Intercommunality: Pays de Ribeauvillé

Government
  - Mayor (2020–2026): Daniel Klack (Independent)
- Area^{1}: 17.04 km^{2} (6.58 sq mi)
- Elevation: 295 m (968 ft)
- Highest elevation: 936 m (3,071 ft)
- Lowest elevation: 230 m (750 ft)
- Population (2023): 999
  - Density: 58.6/km^{2} (152/sq mi)
- Time zone: UTC+01:00 (CET)
  - Summer (DST): UTC+02:00 (CEST)
- INSEE/Postal code: 68277 /68340
- ^{1} French Land Register data, which excludes lakes, ponds, glaciers > 1 km^{2} (0.386 sq mi or 247 acres) and river estuaries.

Riquewihr (French pronunciation: [ʁikviʁ]; Alsatian: Richewihr) is a commune in the Haut-Rhin department in Grand Est in north-eastern France.

A popular tourist attraction for its historical architecture, Riquewihr is also known for the Riesling and other wines produced in the village. Riquewihr looks today more or less as it did in the 16th century. It is located on the Route des Vins (The Wines Road), close to Colmar.

== Geography ==
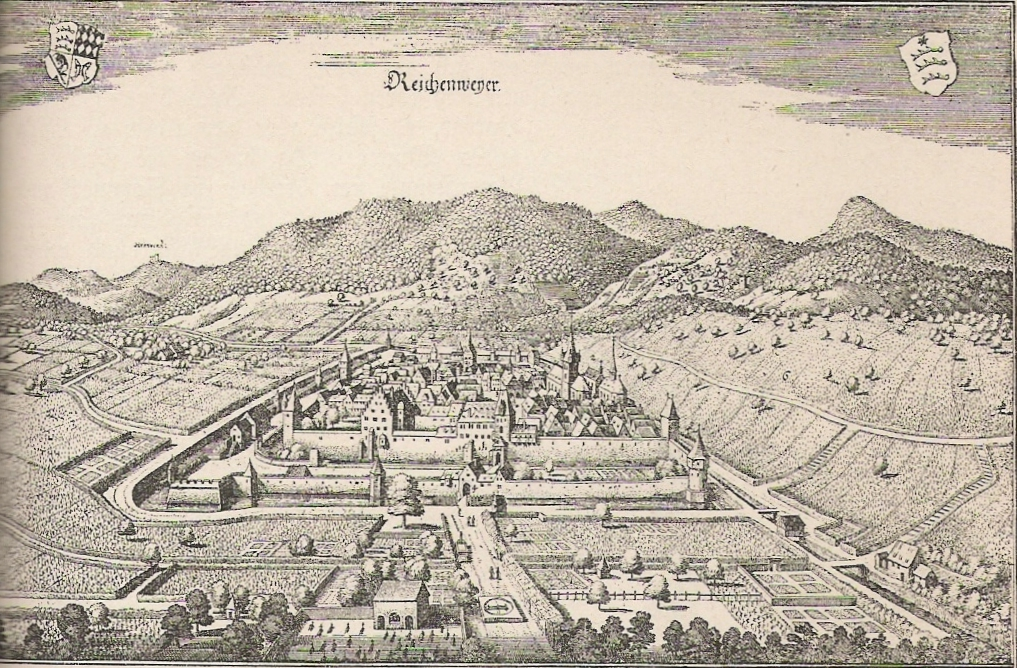
Old map of Reichenweyer / Riquewihr

Riquewihr is 11 kilometres (7 mi) from Colmar and close to other Alsatian villages such as Ribeauvillé, Hunawihr, Eguisheim and Kaysersberg.

== History ==
Originally the property of the Dukes of Württemberg, the town was converted to Protestantism in the 16th century. Historically, Riquewihr served as a Winzerdorf or "wine village" as a trading hub for Alsatian and German wine.

== Sights ==
Riquewihr was one of the few towns in the area not to be badly damaged during World War II. The town is surrounded by its medieval fortifications and is overlooked by a castle from the same period that is today a museum.

There is a museum about Alsace during World War II and a torture chamber (La salle de torture).

The village is a member of the Les Plus Beaux Villages de France ("The most beautiful villages of France") association.

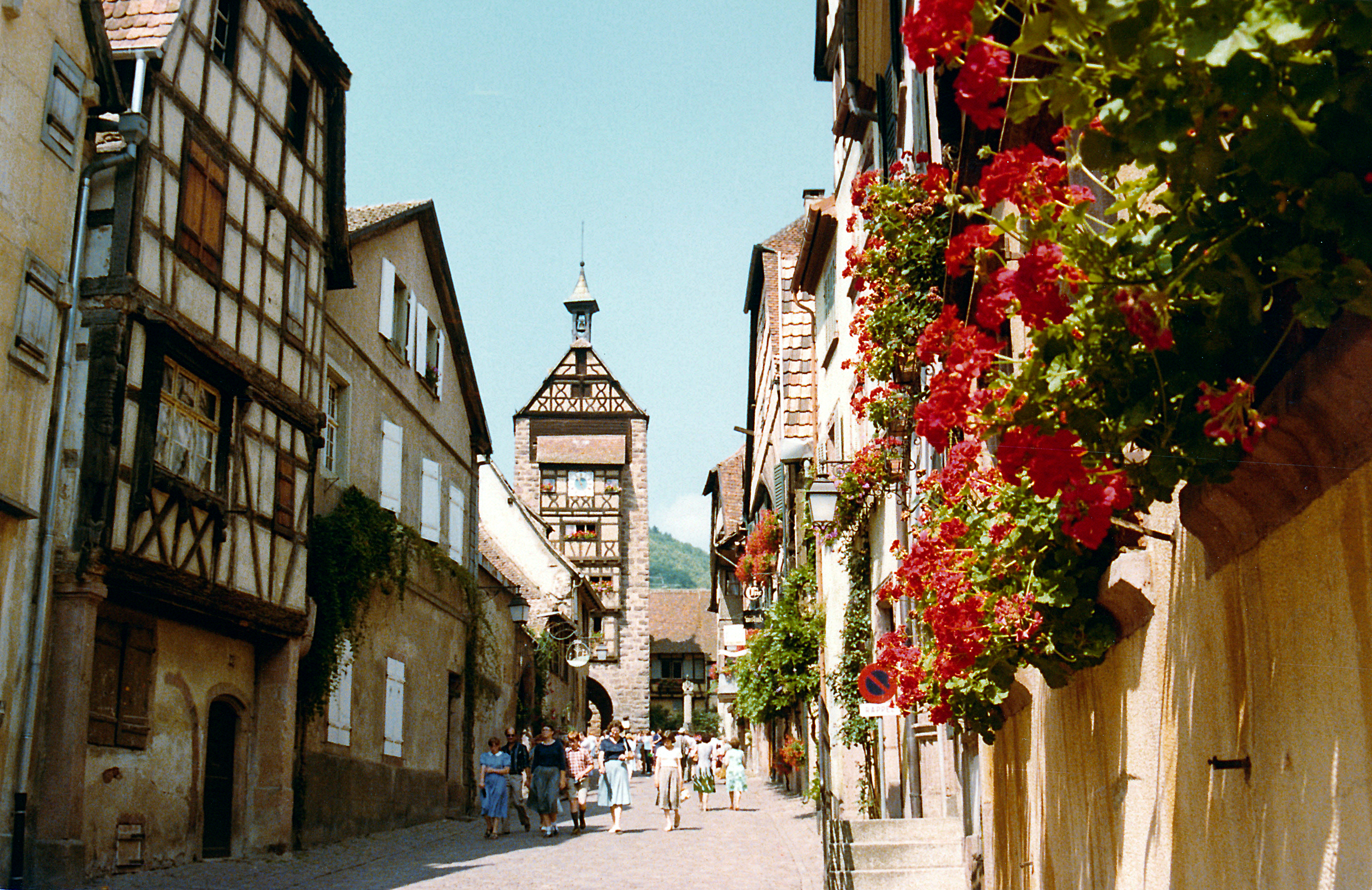
Rue Général de Gaulle

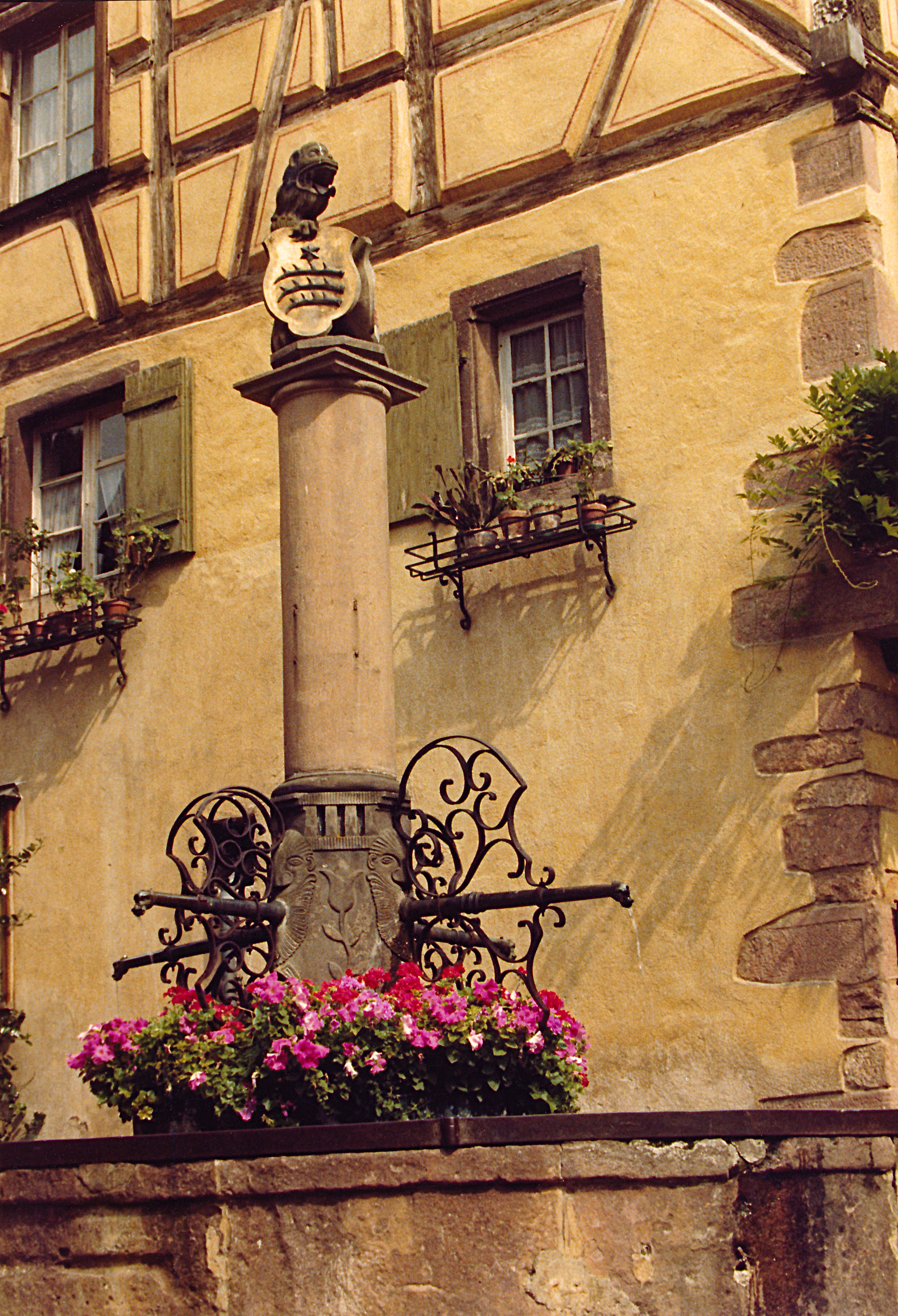
Fountain of the Sinne (1560)

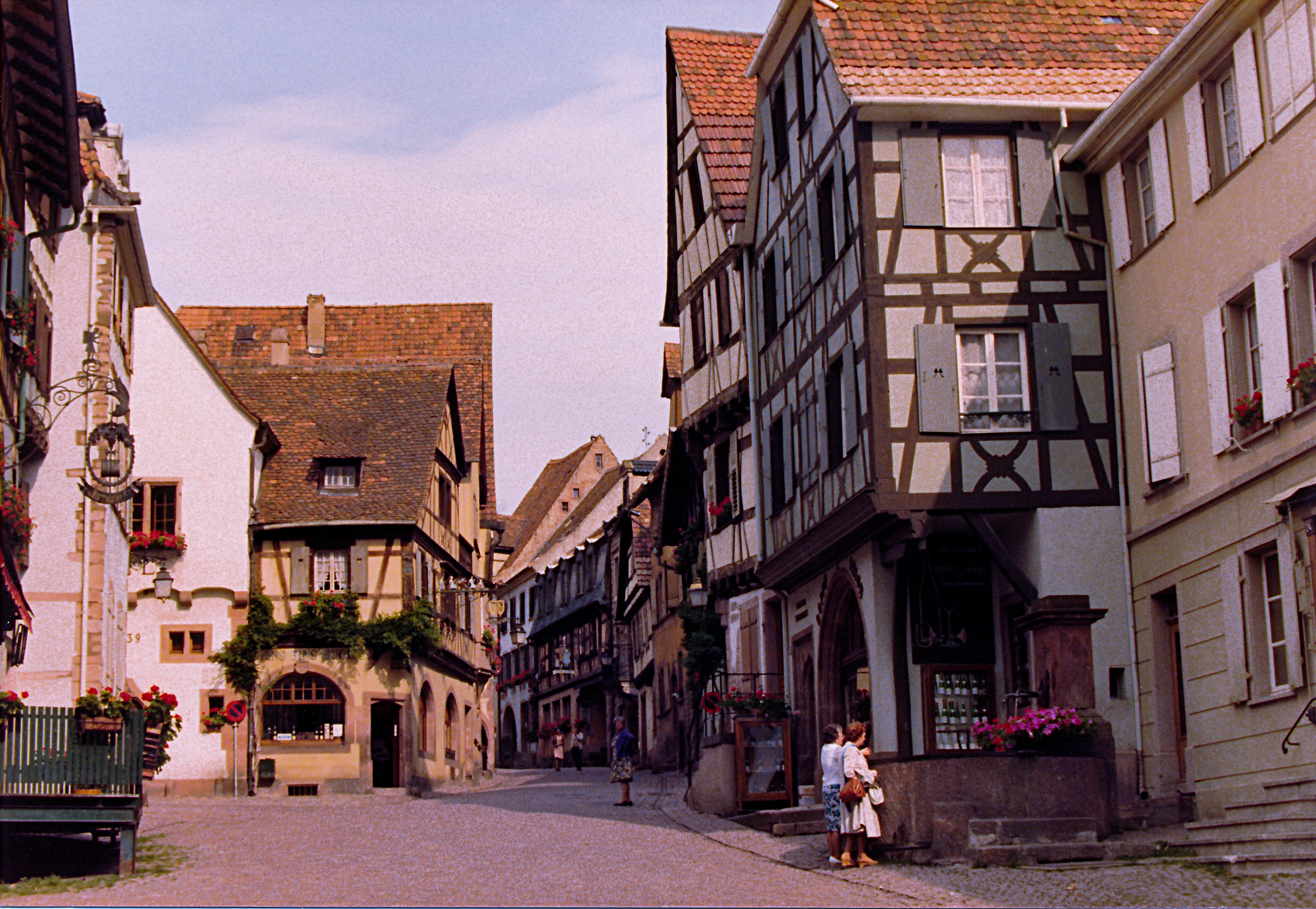
Rue du Général de Gaulle

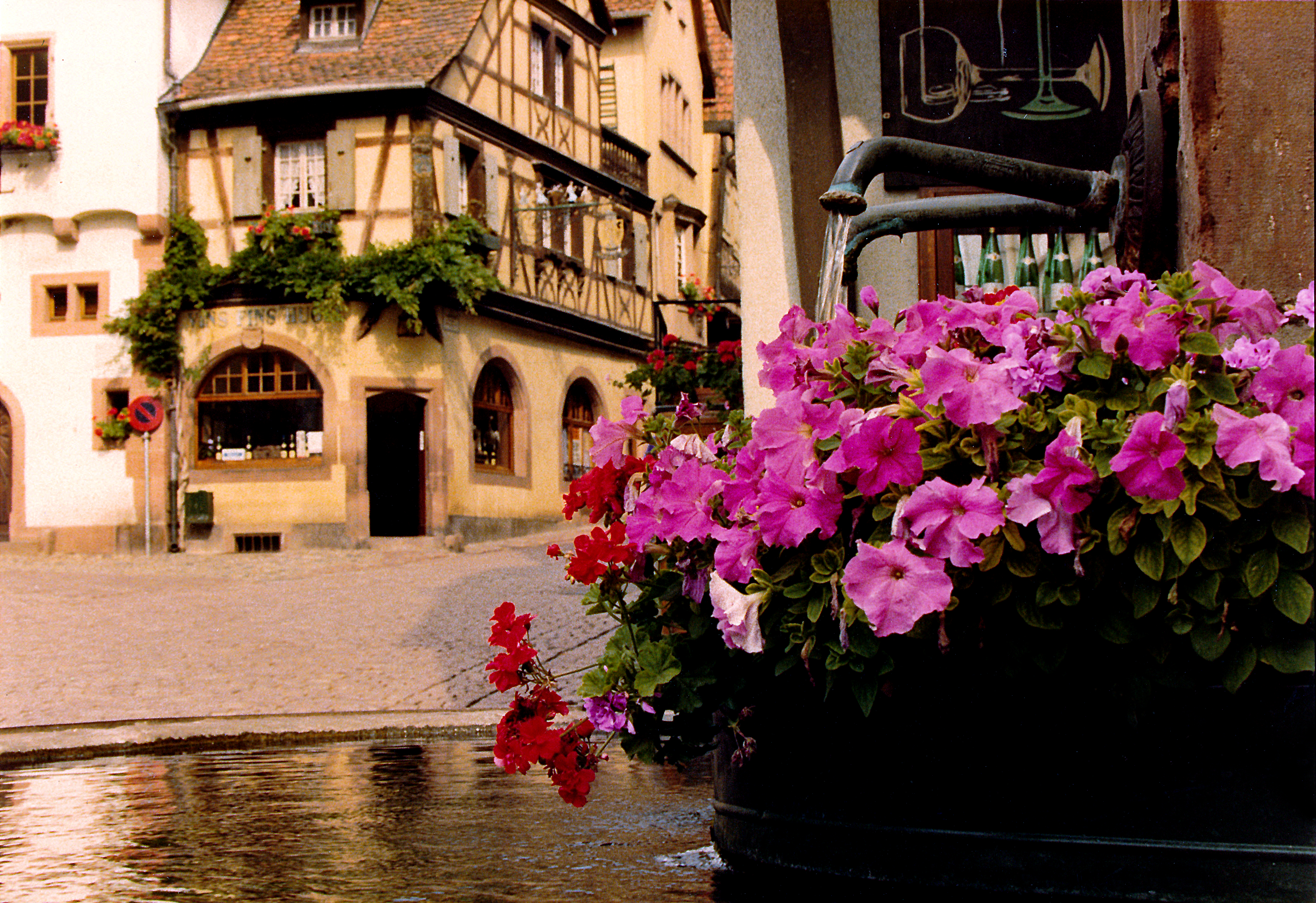
Fountain in the city centre

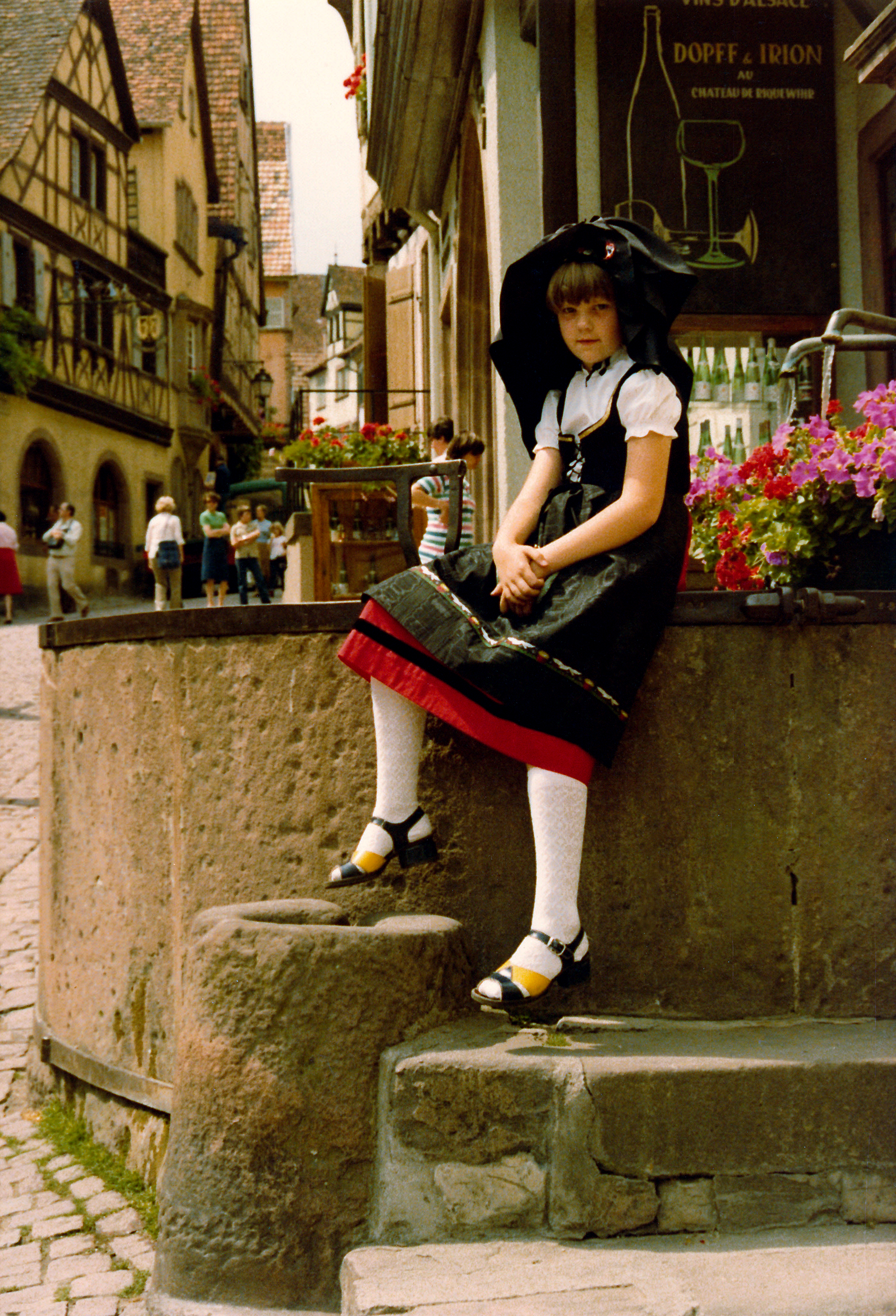
Little girl in traditional costume

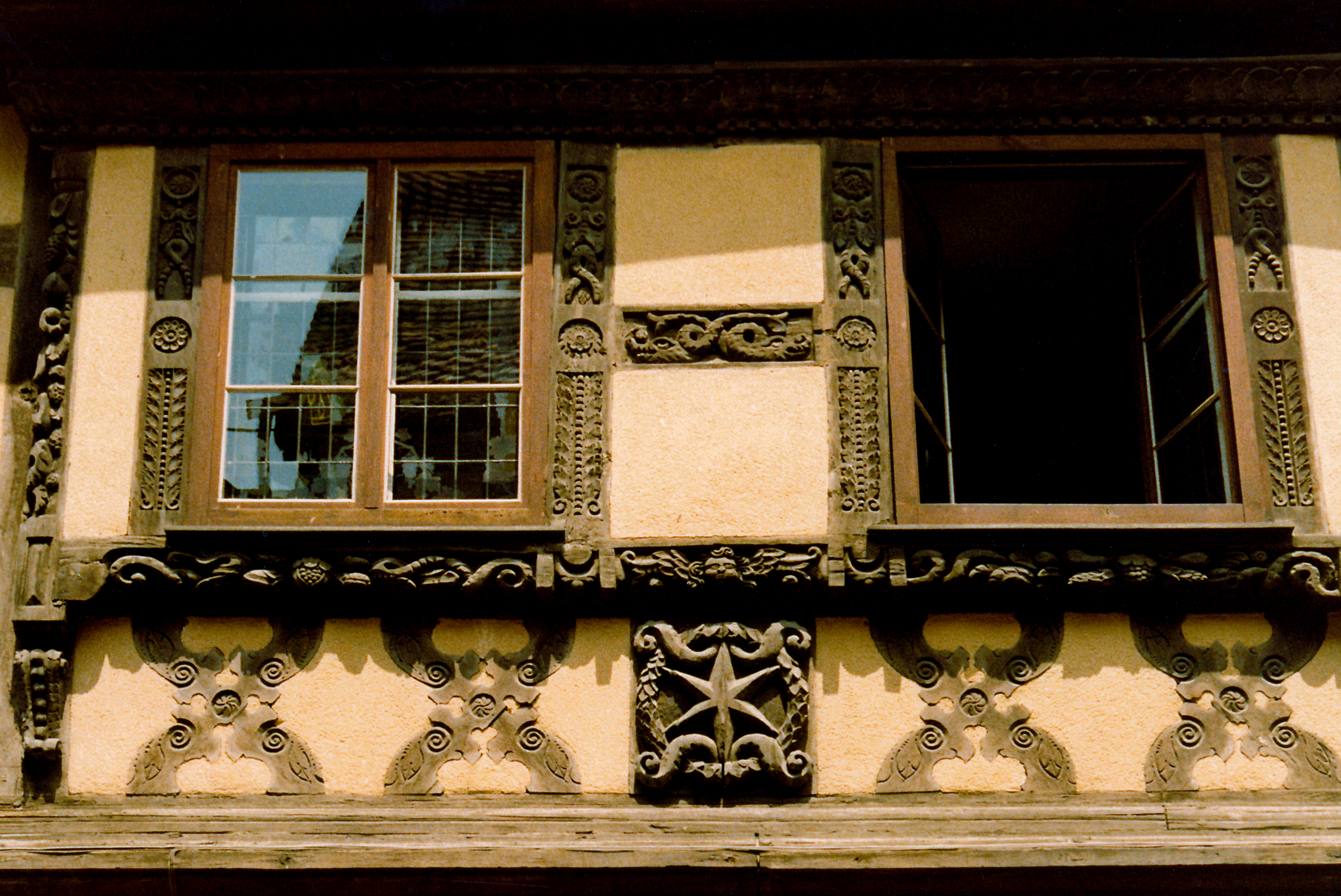
Building known as "Maison à l'Étoile".

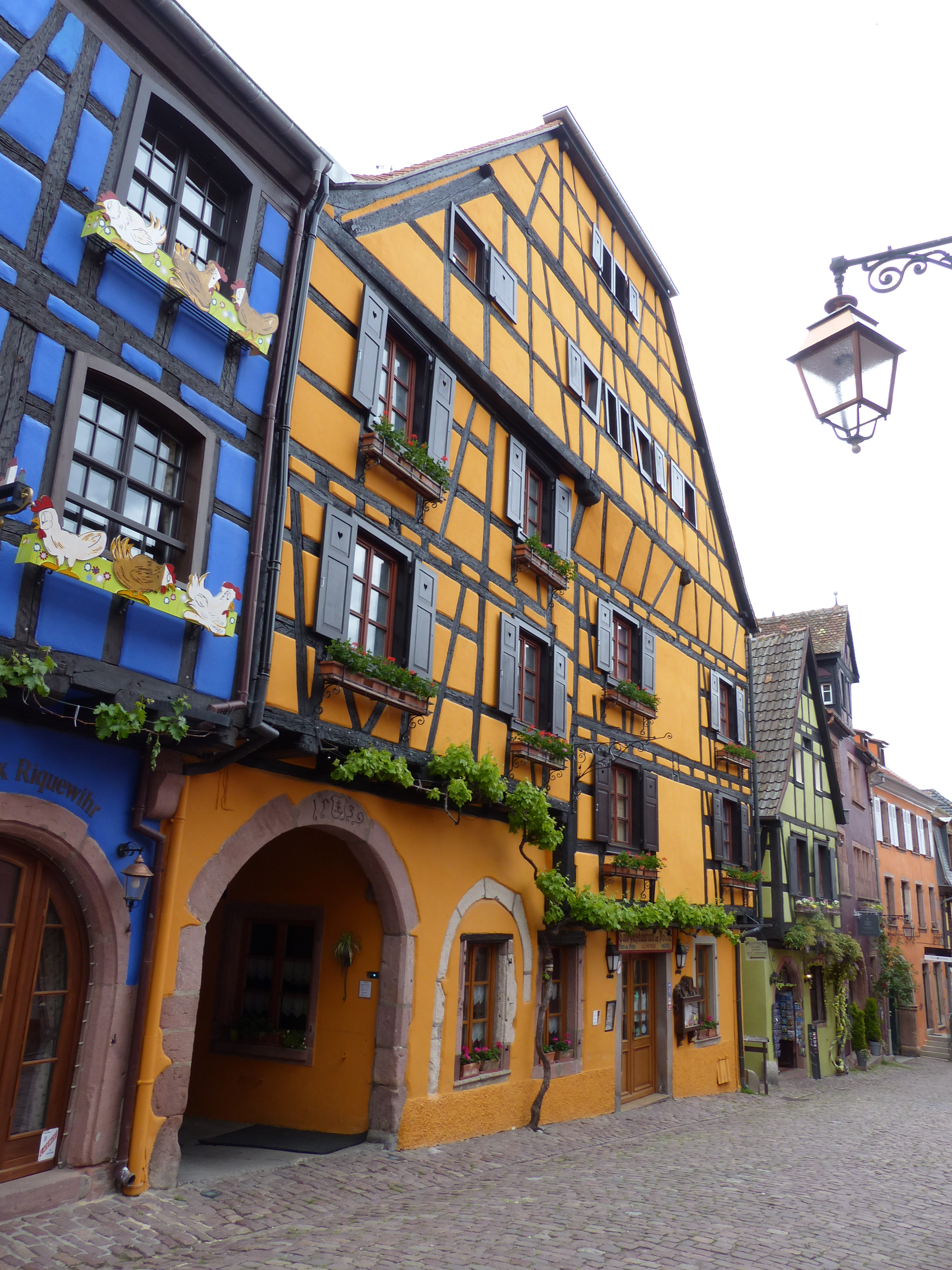
City houses

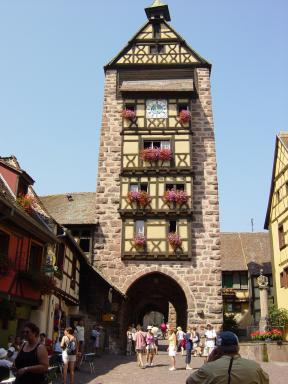
Dolder Tower

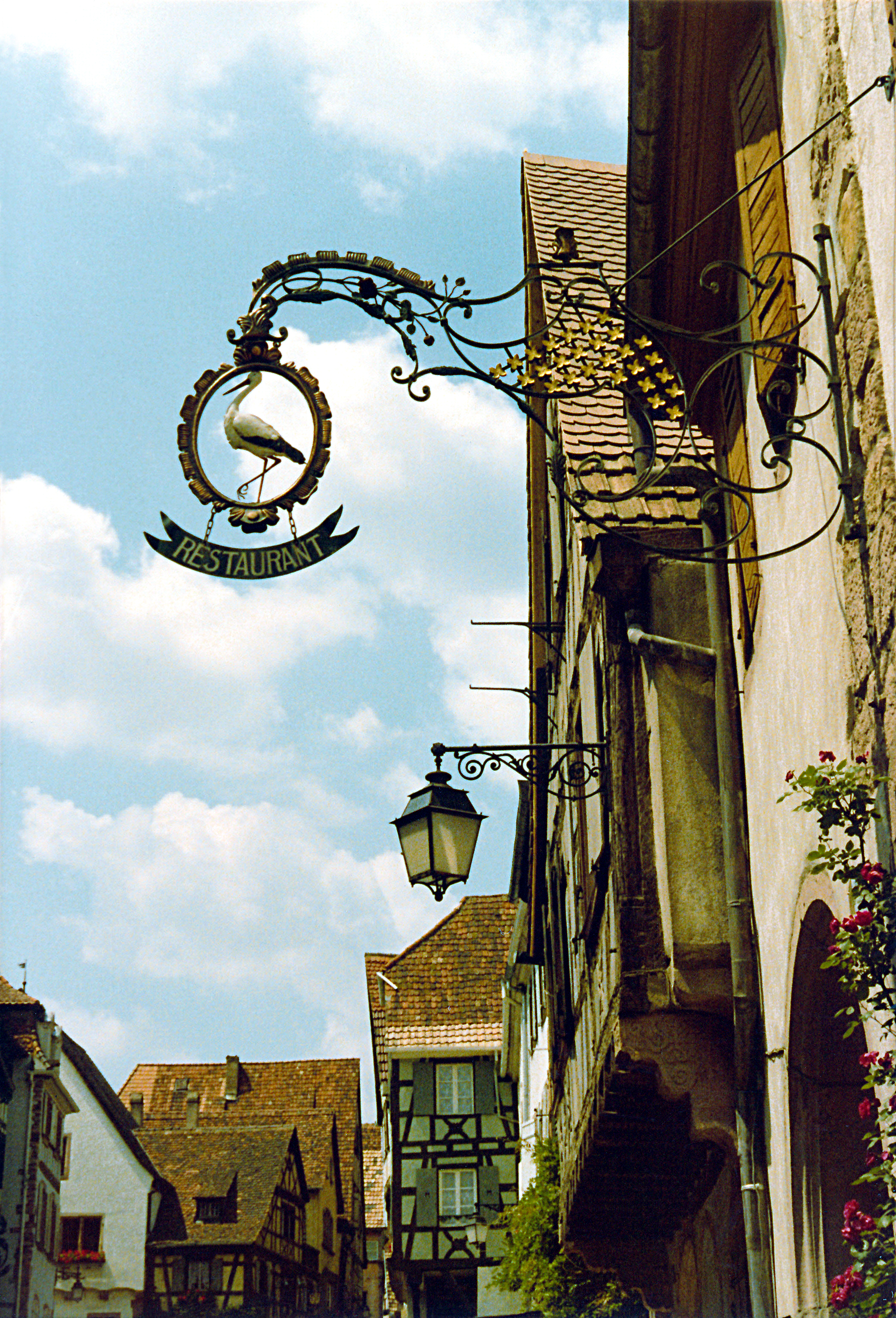
Building known as "Nid de Cigognes".

== People ==
- Karoline Herder (1750-1809), German editor

== See also ==
- Communes of the Haut-Rhin department
