= Bennwihr =

Commune in Grand Est, France

- Commune
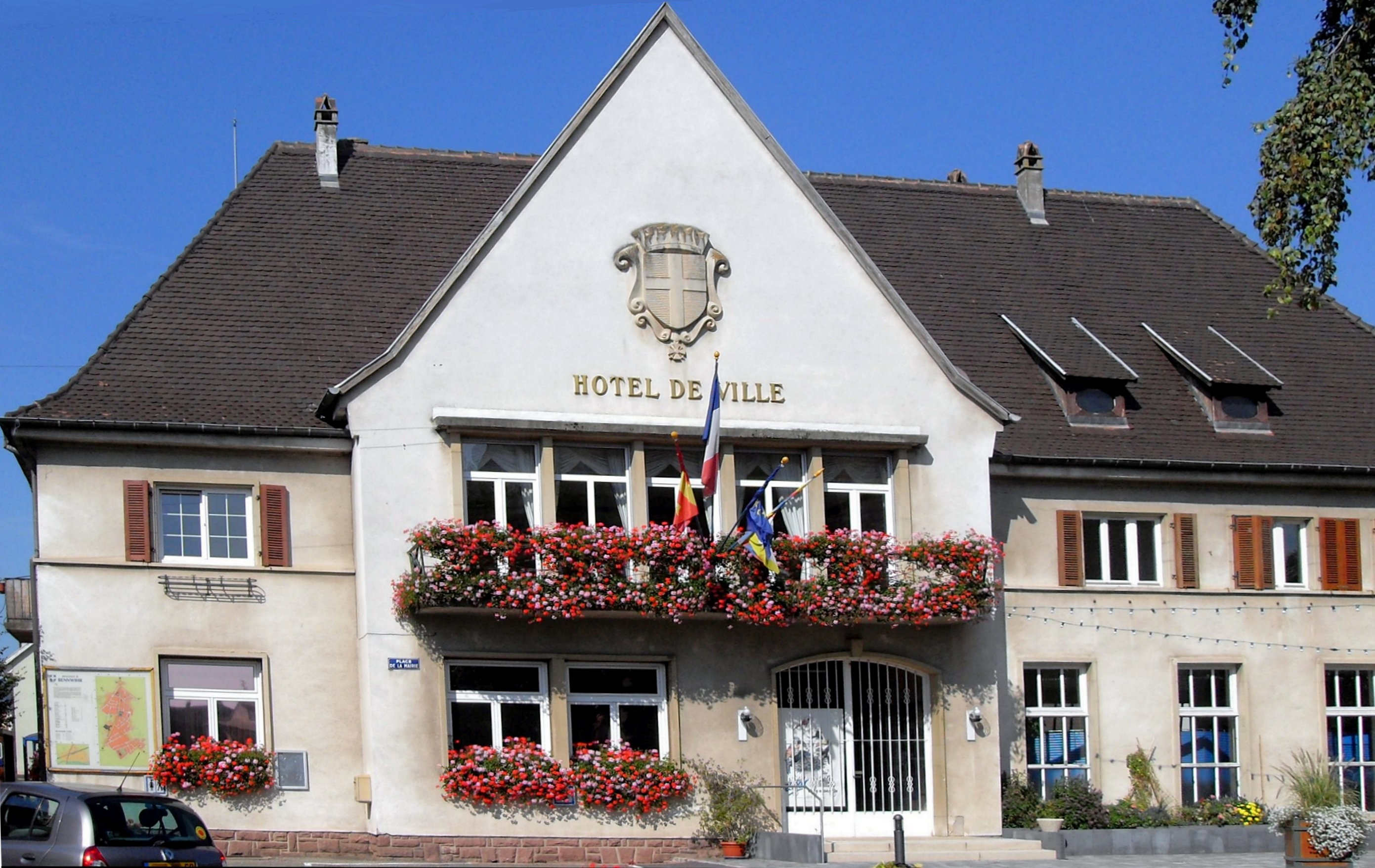
- The town hall in Bennwihr

- Coat of arms
- Location of Bennwihr
- Location within France Location within Grand Est
- Coordinates: 48°08′39″N 7°19′34″E
- Country: France
- Region: Grand Est
- Department: Haut-Rhin
- Arrondissement: Colmar-Ribeauvillé
- Canton: Sainte-Marie-aux-Mines
- Intercommunality: Pays de Ribeauvillé

Government
  - Mayor (2020–2026): Francis Donath
- Area^{1}: 6.59 km^{2} (2.54 sq mi)
- Highest elevation: 354 m (1,161 ft)
- Lowest elevation: 183 m (600 ft)
- Population (2023): 1,326
  - Density: 201/km^{2} (521/sq mi)
- Time zone: UTC+01:00 (CET)
  - Summer (DST): UTC+02:00 (CEST)
- INSEE/Postal code: 68026 /68630
- ^{1} French Land Register data, which excludes lakes, ponds, glaciers > 1 km^{2} (0.386 sq mi or 247 acres) and river estuaries.

Bennwihr (French pronunciation: [bɛnviʁ]; German: Bennweier) is a commune in Grand Est, in northeastern France.

== History ==
Bennwihr figures in a report from the year 777 by Charlemagne's missi dominici. They refer to the village as Beno Villare (Beno's domain), and mention the quality of its wines.

The village was leveled in December 1944 during fighting leading up to the battle known as the Colmar Pocket.

== See also ==
- Communes of the Haut-Rhin department
