= Gueberschwihr =

Commune in Grand Est, France

Gueberschwihr Gawerschwihr
- Commune
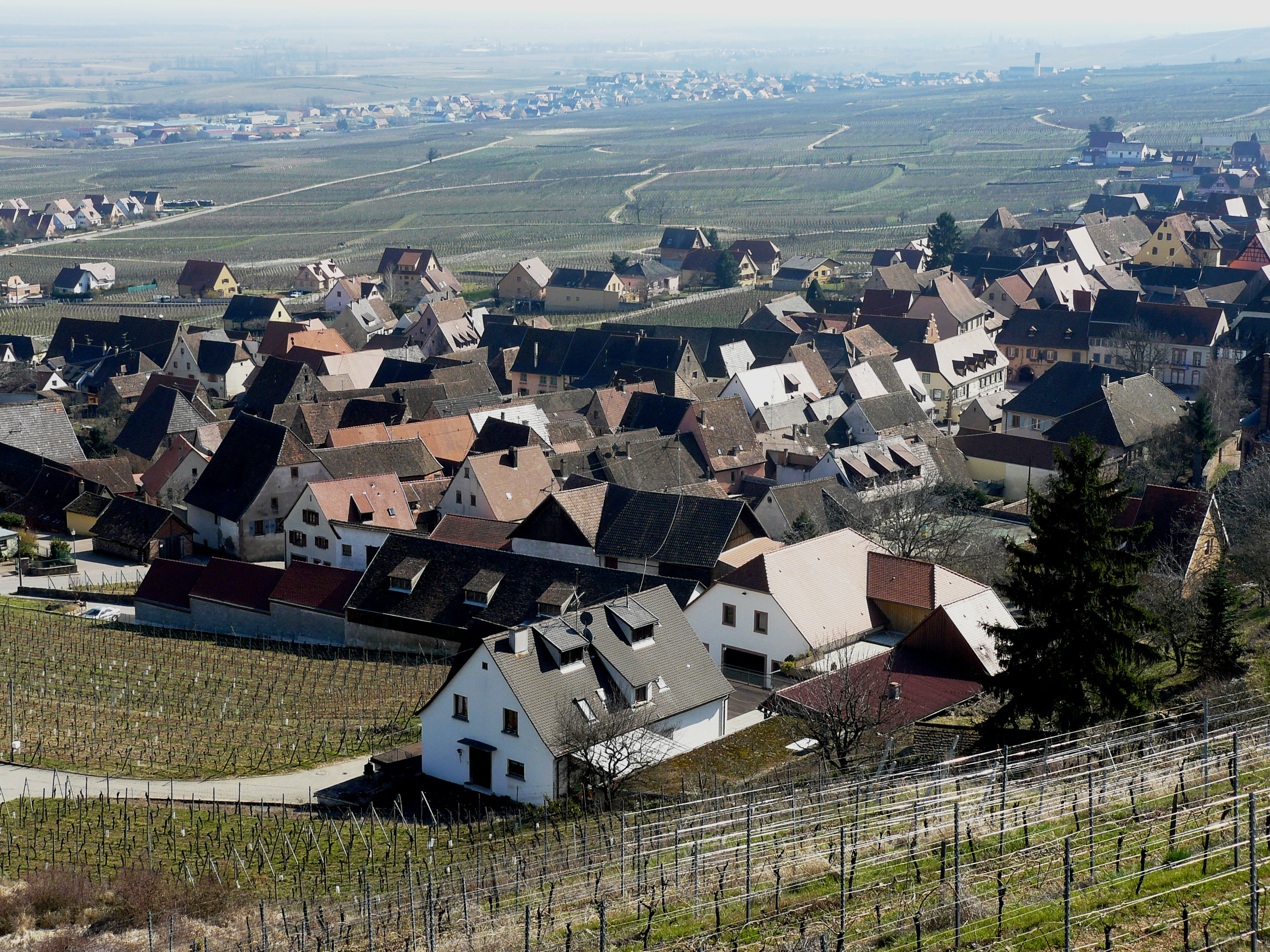
- Part of the village of Gueberschwihr seen from the hillside

- Coat of arms
- Location of Gueberschwihr
- Location within France Location within Grand Est
- Coordinates: 48°00′16″N 7°16′37″E
- Country: France
- Region: Grand Est
- Department: Haut-Rhin
- Arrondissement: Thann-Guebwiller
- Canton: Wintzenheim

Government
  - Mayor (2020–2026): Roland Husser
- Area^{1}: 8.91 km^{2} (3.44 sq mi)
- Elevation: 260 m (850 ft)
- Highest elevation: 873 m (2,864 ft)
- Lowest elevation: 197 m (646 ft)
- Population (2023): 807
  - Density: 90.6/km^{2} (235/sq mi)
- Time zone: UTC+01:00 (CET)
  - Summer (DST): UTC+02:00 (CEST)
- INSEE/Postal code: 68111 /68420
- ^{1} French Land Register data, which excludes lakes, ponds, glaciers > 1 km^{2} (0.386 sq mi or 247 acres) and river estuaries.

Gueberschwihr (French pronunciation: [gebəʁʃviʁ]; Alemannic German: Gawerschwihr; German: Geberschweier) is a commune in the Haut-Rhin department in Grand Est in north-eastern France.

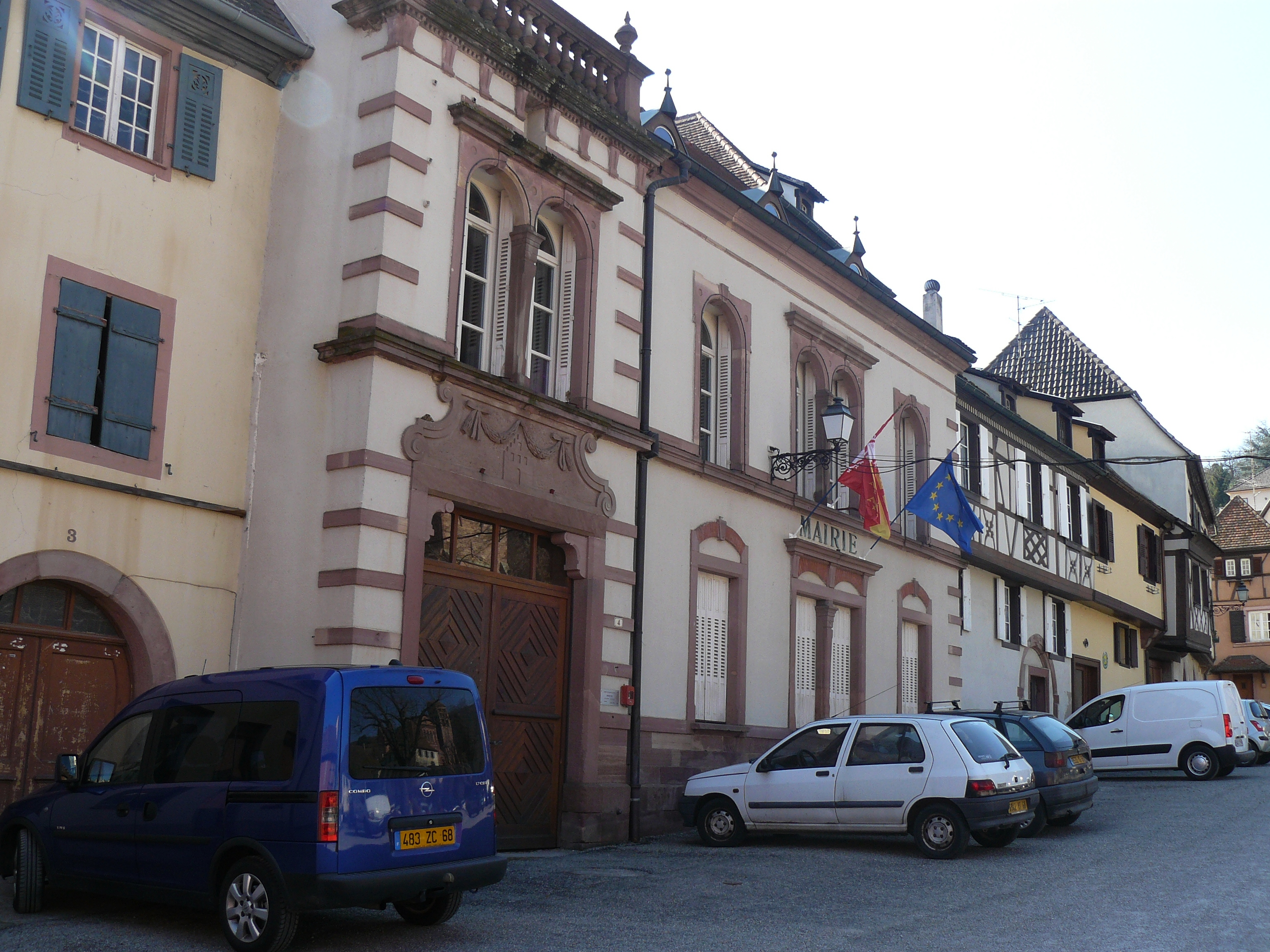
Town hall

Church

== See also ==
- Communes of the Haut-Rhin département
