= Hunawihr =

Commune in Grand Est, France

Hunawihr Hunaweier (German)
- Commune
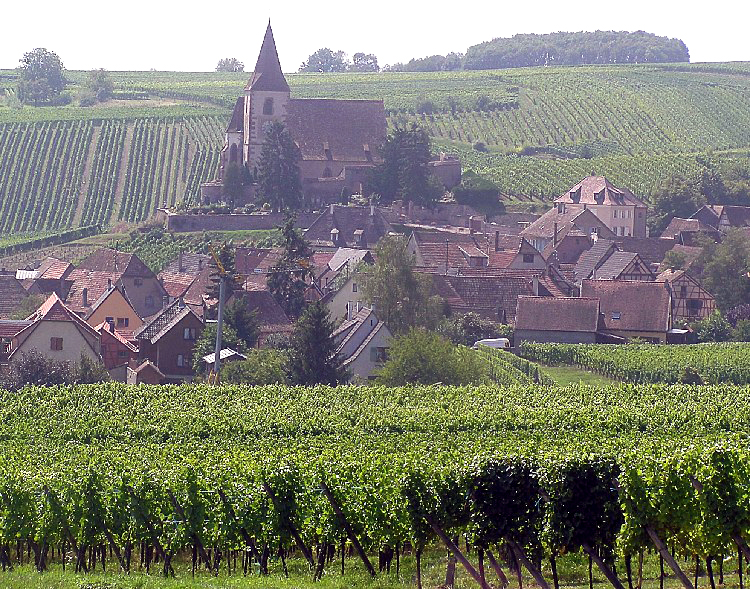
- View of Hunawihr, with the fortified Saint-Jacques-le-Majeur Church and vineyards

- Coat of arms
- Location of Hunawihr
- Location within France Location within Grand Est
- Coordinates: 48°10′51″N 7°18′44″E
- Country: France
- Region: Grand Est
- Department: Haut-Rhin
- Arrondissement: Colmar-Ribeauvillé
- Canton: Sainte-Marie-aux-Mines
- Intercommunality: Pays de Ribeauvillé

Government
  - Mayor (2020–2026): Gabriel Siegrist
- Area^{1}: 4.81 km^{2} (1.86 sq mi)
- Highest elevation: 686 m (2,251 ft)
- Lowest elevation: 228 m (748 ft)
- Population (2023): 555
  - Density: 115/km^{2} (299/sq mi)
- Time zone: UTC+01:00 (CET)
  - Summer (DST): UTC+02:00 (CEST)
- INSEE/Postal code: 68147 /68150
- ^{1} French Land Register data, which excludes lakes, ponds, glaciers > 1 km^{2} (0.386 sq mi or 247 acres) and river estuaries.

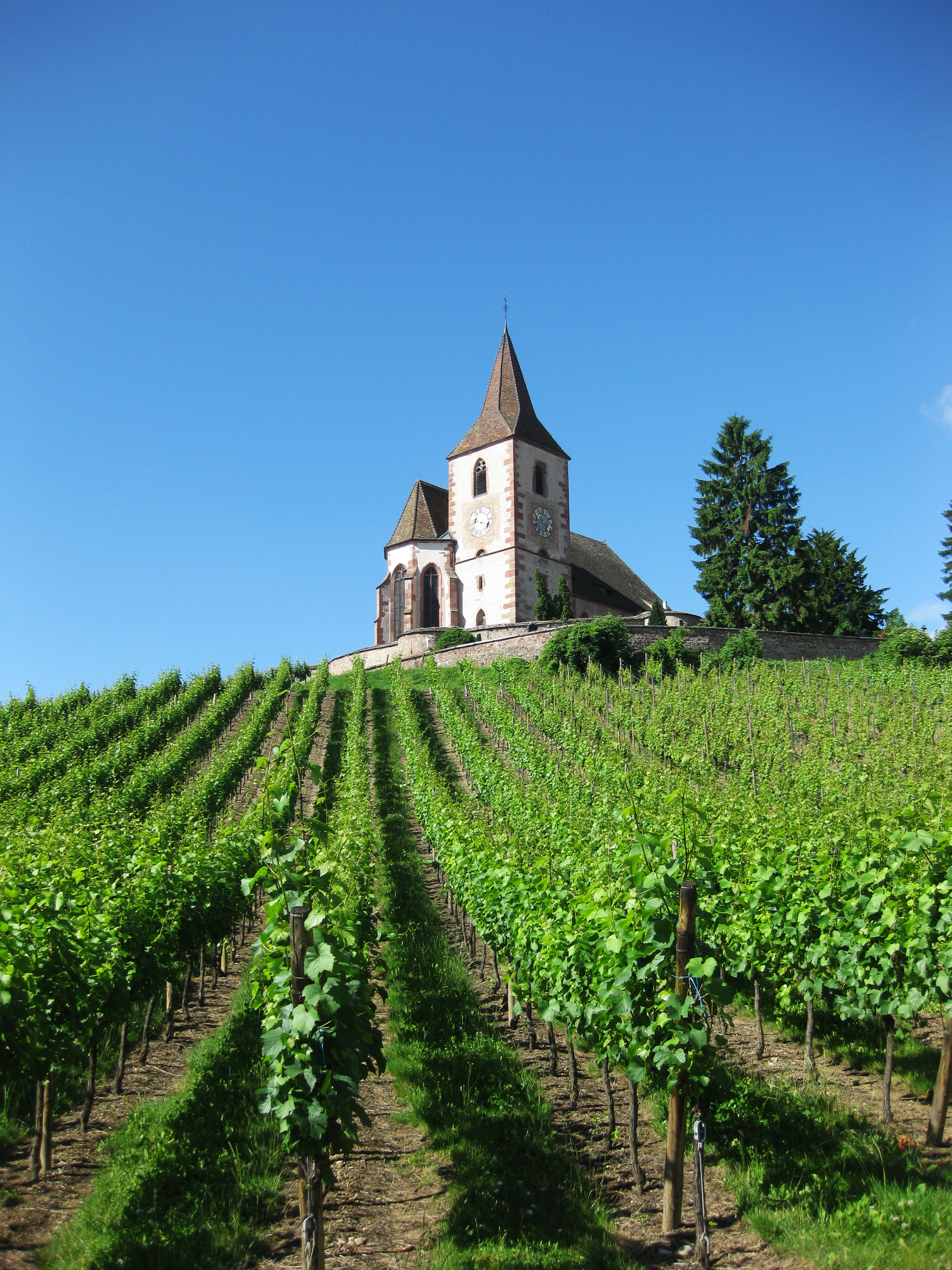
Hunawihr fortified church as seen from the vineyard below it.

Hunawihr (French pronunciation: [ynaviʁ]; German: Hunaweier) is a commune in the Haut-Rhin department in Grand Est in north-eastern France.

The village is a member of the Les Plus Beaux Villages de France ("The most beautiful villages of France") association.

== See also ==
- Communes of the Haut-Rhin département
