= Klevener de Heiligenstein =

Coordinates: 48°25′38″N 7°27′32″E

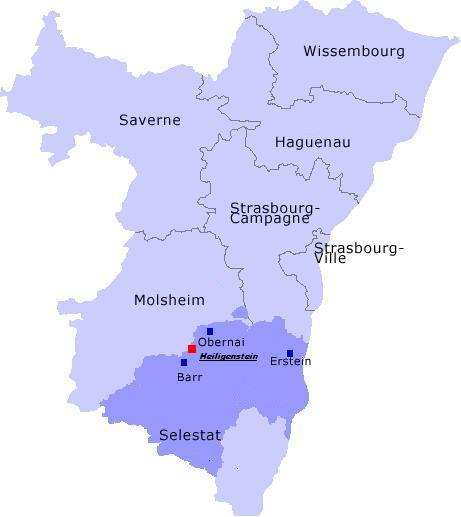
Location of the village of Heiligenstein (red dot) in the arrondissement of Sélestat-Erstein in Bas-Rhin département of Alsace.

Klevener de Heiligenstein, also known in English by its German name, Heiligensteiner Klevener, is a designation used on Alsace wine made from pink-skinned Savagnin rose grapes, a variety in the Traminer family, but which is less aromatic than Gewürztraminer, which is widely planted in Alsace. The designation may be allowed for selected vineyards in the villages of Bourgheim, Gertwiller, Goxwiller, Heiligenstein and Obernai but, under current appellation rules, the designation may be used until 2021 for specified existing vineyards outside the designation area. Since Savagnin rose is not a permitted variety for other Alsace wines, its replanting outside this area is not allowed.

Since most Alsace wines are varietally labeled, it is a common misunderstanding to believe "Klevener de Heiligenstein" to be a local variety. In fact, it is the only geographical designation within the Appellation d'origine contrôlée (AOC) Alsace.

== History ==
The Savagnin vine was introduced to the Alsace region in 1740 by Erhard Wantz, mayor of the village of Heiligenstein. Ampelographers believe that the cuttings that Wantz brought originated from vineyards planted in the Italian Alps near Chiavenna in Lombardy. In 1971, the Klevener de Heiligenstein designation was included in the AOC regulations for Alsace. It is not a separate appellation, but rather a designation within Alsace AOC which is defined both in terms of the grape variety and location within Alsace. This differs Klevener de Heiligenstein from the other varietal designations of Alsace AOC, which may be used in the entire region. Also, Savagnin rose grape is the only Alsatian grape variety which is restricted to a specific subregion of Alsace, i.e. to Heiligenstein and the specified areas of the surrounding villages cited above.

== Relationship to Gewürztraminer ==
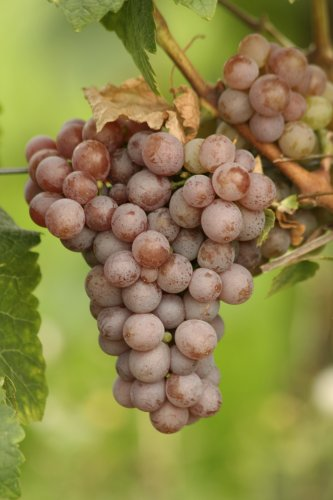
Gewürztraminer grapes. Savagnin Rose grapes are almost indistinguishable except for the translucent skin quality that the appear just prior to veraison.

The vines of the Savagnin rose variety planted in Alsace bear striking similarities, morphologically, to Gewürztraminer vines and are almost indistinguishable on inspection. Outside of DNA testing and analysis of the wine that both grapes produce, the only noticeable difference is that just prior to veraison the grapes of Savagnin rose turn almost translucent while the skins of Gewürztraminer grapes are more opaque. While Gewürztraminer was present in Alsace since the Middle Ages, the 18th century introduction of Savagnin rose did cause some confusion among vineyards as to which variety they had planted.

The most obvious way to distinguish the two was to compare the type of wines that each produces with Gewürztraminer wine being much more aromatic. Until the 1970s, winemakers would label wines of better quality "Gewürztraminer" and wines of lesser quality "Traminer" or "Klevener de Heiligenstein", regardless of the final composition of Gewürztraminer, Savagnin rose and/or Traminer in the wine. In 1973, the names Traminer and Savagnin Rose was discontinued from use on Alsatian wine labels. Due to the significant and early plantings of Savagnin rose in Heiligenstein and the villages around it, the wine style of "Klevener de Heiligenstein" was granted its place however.

== Wine style ==
Klevener de Heiligenstein does have some similarities to wines made from its cousin grape, Gewürztraminer. Both can produce dry wines with a slight spicy flavor that has the potential to age well, especially in favorable vintages. It is less aromatic than Gewürztraminer with higher acidity and lower alcohol levels. Some styles can show a slight buttery flavor. Outside of exceptional vintages, Klevener de Heiligenstein typically has delicate fruit flavors that start to fade after 2–4 years. The wine is not to be confused with other wines made from grape varieties named Klevner, such as Pinot blanc which have frequently been called Klevner in Alsace, although this use seems on the decline.
