= Klevner =

Klevner or Clevner is a synonym for various grape varieties and wines, and is primarily used in German-speaking wine regions. The word derives from the Swiss version of the name of the Northern Italian town Chiavenna, Kleven, situated at the north end of Lake Como. Swiss mercenaries brought grapevines from that region back home across the Alps at the beginning of the 16th Century.

- In general, it is most commonly applied to various members of the Pinot family, but sometimes to grapes of the Traminer family
- In Alsace it usually refers to the variety Pinot blanc, but under the appellation rules it may be applied as a wine designation to a white wine consisting of Auxerrois blanc, Pinot blanc, Pinot gris and Pinot noir (vinified as a white wine, blanc de noirs) in any proportion
- In Switzerland, and especially the canton of Zurich, it usually refers to Pinot noir
- In Baden, and especially in the district of Ortenau, Clevner usually refers to Traminer
- In Slovakia, one particular village (Radošina) uses the name Radošinský Klevner for its cuvée made from Pinot gris (Grauburgunder) and Pinot blanc (Weissburgunder). The wine (vintage 1947) was served at the coronation of Elizabeth II.

Klevener refers to an Alsace wine called Klevener de Heiligenstein, which is made from the variety Savagnin rose, which is a grape in the Traminer family
