= Antcliff =

Antcliff is a surname. Notable people with the surname include:

- A.J. Antcliff of Gewürztraminer
