= Savagnin rose =

Variety of grape

Savagnin Rose
- Grape (Vitis)
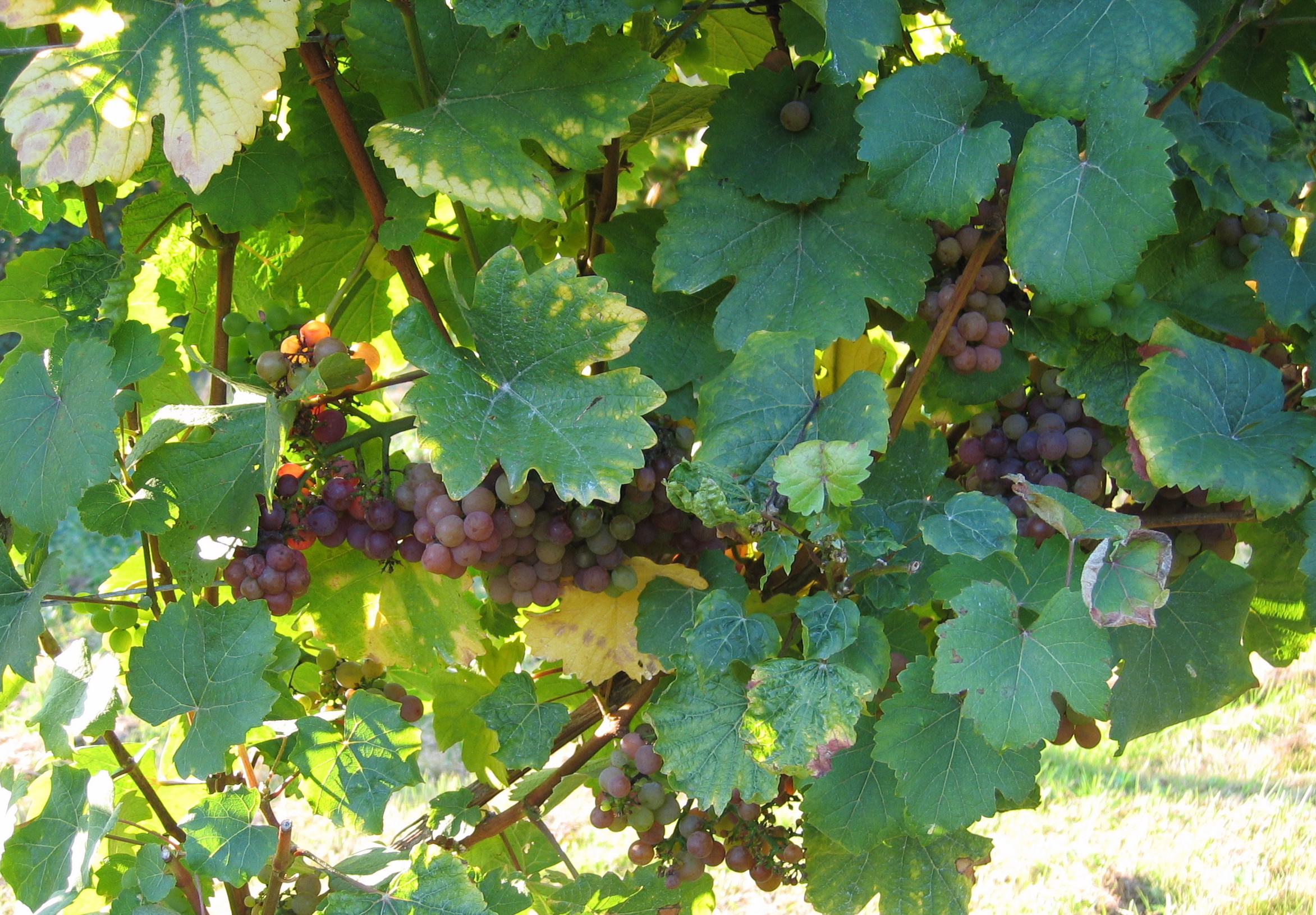
- Roter Traminer growing in Rheingau
- Color of berry skin: Rose
- Species: Vitis vinifera
- Also called: Roter Traminer and other synonyms
- Origin: France ?
- Notable regions: Alsace
- Notable wines: Klevener de Heiligenstein
- VIVC number: 10797

Savagnin rose (French pronunciation: [savaɲɛ̃ ʁoz]) or Roter Traminer is a variety of wine grape. It has a pink, reddish or brownish red skin colour, but is counted as a white wine grape since it does not have the deep purple/blue/black colour of red wine grapes.

Savagnin rose is a member of the Traminer family of grapes, and as such is related to both Savagnin Blanc and Gewürztraminer. It has a different skin colour than Savagnin Blanc, and does not have the aromatic properties of the much more common Gewürztraminer, which is a musqué mutation of Savagnin rose, or of a similar red-skinned Traminer variety.

Savagnin rose is now relatively rare in cultivation, and primarily found only in pure plantation and varietal wines in Alsace, where the designation Klevener de Heiligenstein denotes a wine produced from Savagnin rose. It is also likely that a proportion of non-musqué red Traminer exists side by side with musqué red Traminer/Gewürztraminer in older vineyards of Germany and Austria.

The vines of the Savagnin rose variety planted in Alsace bear striking similarities, morphologically, to Gewürztraminer vines and are almost indistinguishable on inspection. Outside of DNA testing and analysis of the wine that both grapes produce, the only noticeable difference is that just prior to veraison the grapes of Savagnin rose turn almost translucent while the skins of Gewürztraminer grapes are more opaque. The most obvious way to distinguish the two was to compare the type of wines that each produces, with Gewürztraminer wine being much more aromatic.

Until the 1970s, winemakers would label wines of better quality "Gewürztraminer" and wines of lesser quality "Traminer" or "Klevener de Heiligenstein", regardless of the final composition of Gewürztraminer, Savagnin rose and/or Traminer in the wine. In 1973, the names Traminer and Savagnin rose were discontinued from use on Alsatian wine labels. Due to the significant plantings of Savagnin rose in Heiligenstein and the villages around it, the wine style of "Klevener de Heiligenstein" was granted a grace period for use of that name.

== Synonyms ==
For the Traminer family in general, it is difficult to establish where the line goes between synonyms and different varieties. Savagnin rose is however also known under the synonyms Clevner, Drumin, Fromenteau rouge, Heiligensteiner Clevner, Heiligensteiner Klevner, Klevner Livora, Livora Cervena, Prinç, Prinç Ceverny, Roter Traminer, Ryvola, Savagnin rose non musqué, Tramin Cerveny, Tramin Diseci, Tramin Korenny, Tramin Rdeci, Traminac Crveni, Traminac Rdeci, Traminer rose, Traminer Rot, Traminer Roz.

== See also ==
- Klevener de Heiligenstein
