= Meistratzheim =

Meistratzheim Mäischterze
- Commune
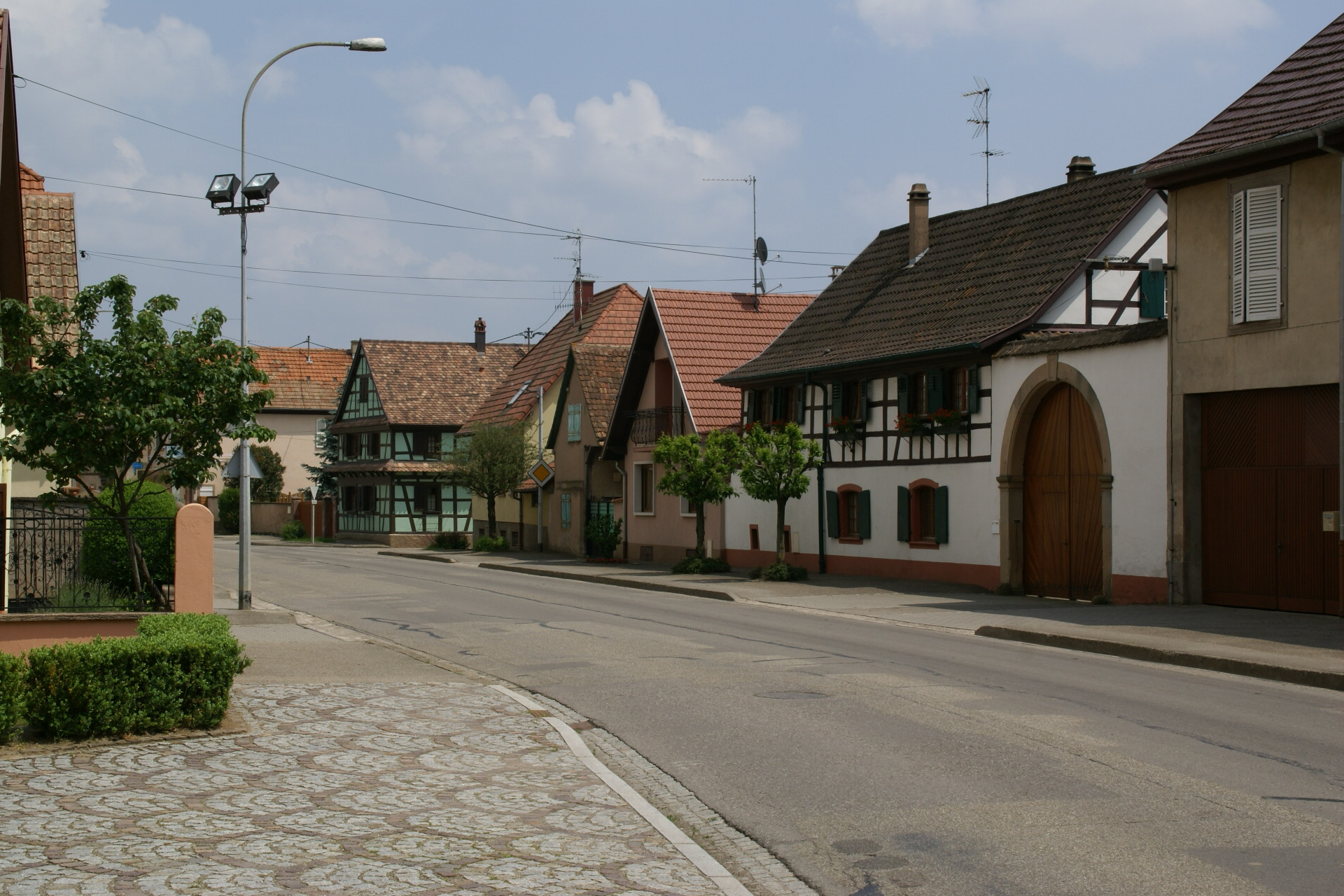
- Rue Principale

- Coat of arms
- Location of Meistratzheim
- Location within France Location within Grand Est
- Coordinates: 48°26′58″N 7°32′38″E
- Country: France
- Region: Grand Est
- Department: Bas-Rhin
- Arrondissement: Sélestat-Erstein
- Canton: Obernai
- Intercommunality: Pays de Sainte-Odile

Government
  - Mayor (2020–2026): Claude Krauss
- Area^{1}: 12.82 km^{2} (4.95 sq mi)
- Highest elevation: 162 m (531 ft)
- Lowest elevation: 150 m (490 ft)
- Population (2023): 1,570
  - Density: 122/km^{2} (317/sq mi)
- Time zone: UTC+01:00 (CET)
  - Summer (DST): UTC+02:00 (CEST)
- INSEE/Postal code: 67286 /67210
- ^{1} French Land Register data, which excludes lakes, ponds, glaciers > 1 km^{2} (0.386 sq mi or 247 acres) and river estuaries.

Meistratzheim (French pronunciation: [maistʁatsaim]) is a commune in the Bas-Rhin department in Grand Est in north-eastern France.

== History ==
Located near a Celtic-Romanic route connecting Belfort with Brumath, the village has been occupied since the Neolithic. the village is mentioned for the first time in a parchment dating from 742 where it says that the convent of Wissembourg had possessions in Maistersheim.

Initially the village belonged to the Count of Nordgau and from 742 to 1030 to different abbeys. The fief was then acquired by the diocese of Strasbourg and later by the Landsberg family, who held it up to the French Revolution.

During the seventeenth century the village was pillaged by passing Imperial, Swedish, Lorraine and French troops. Famine came because of rigorous winters and poor harvests.

The village was also home to Eugène Grau, who founded a successful family butchers business which continued for several generations. The family also owned a large property used for Monumental masonry.

== Points of interest ==
The catholic church, Saint André, was built from 1911 to 1919, consecrated in 1922 and is at 75 m the highest in Bas-Rhin outside of Strasbourg.

== Education ==
The Classe de Japonais en Alsace (アルザス補習授業校 Aruzasu Hoshū Jugyō Kō), a part-time Japanese supplementary school, is held in the A.P.E.J.A. in Meistratzheim.

== Photo gallery ==
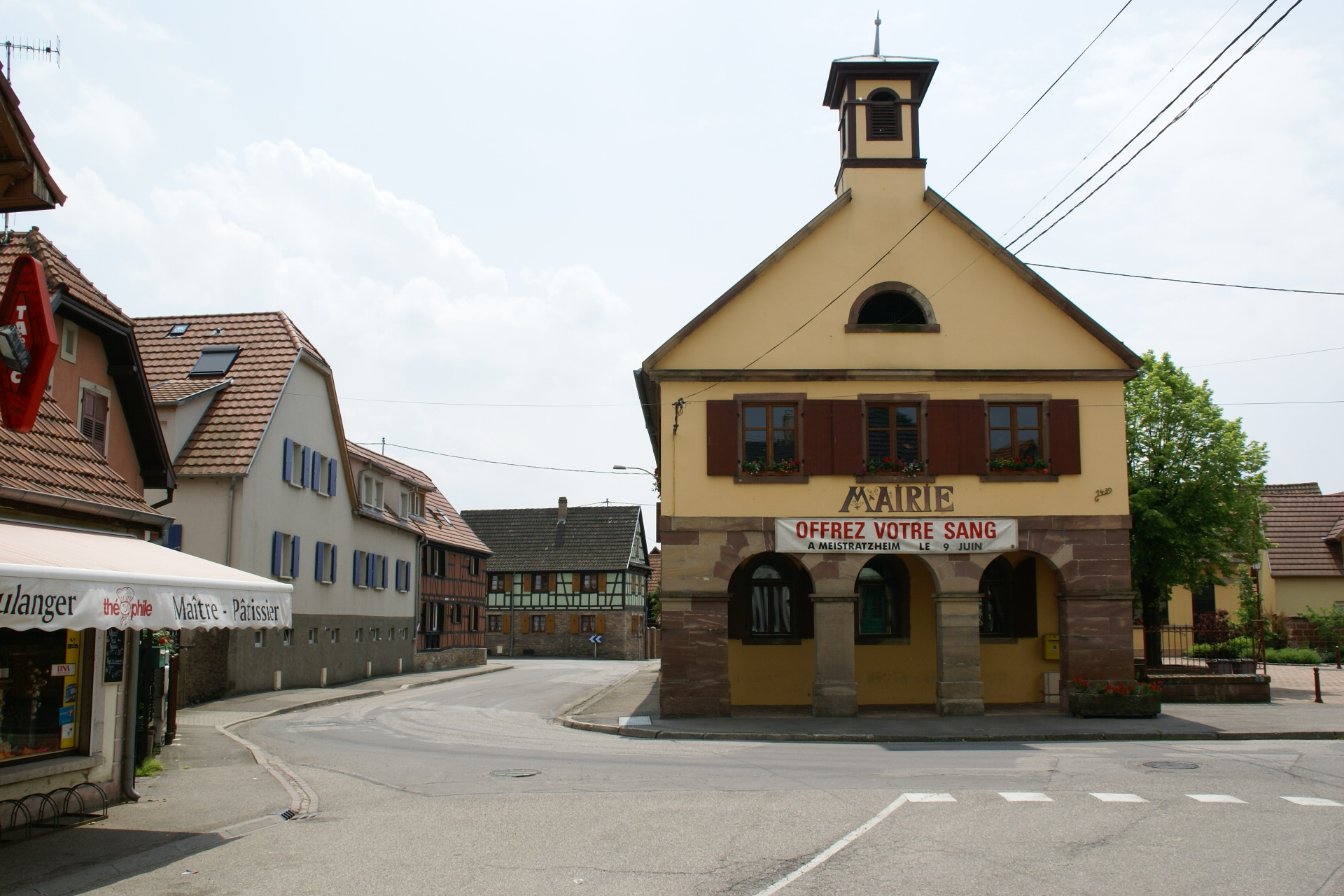
Town Hall

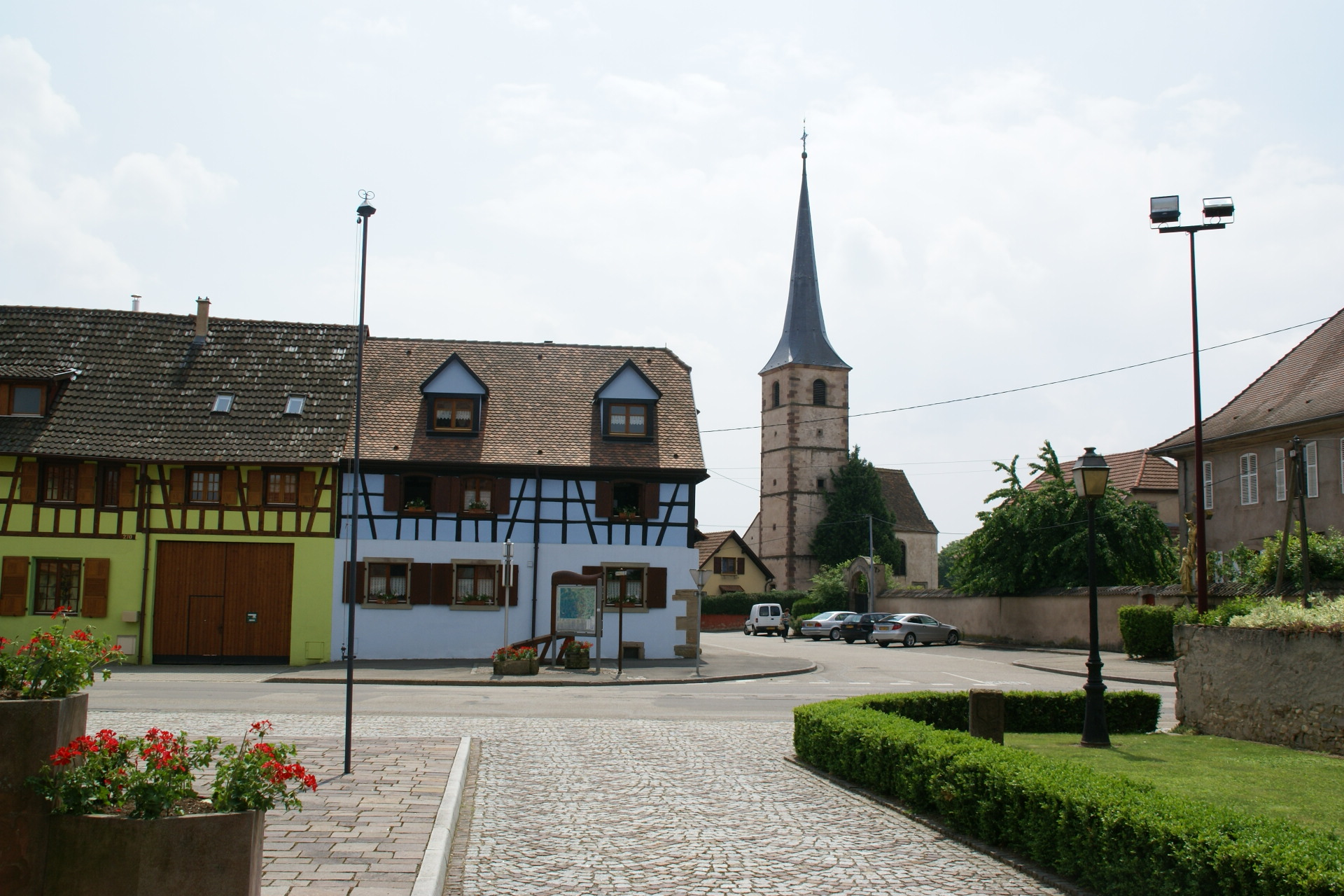
Evangelical church

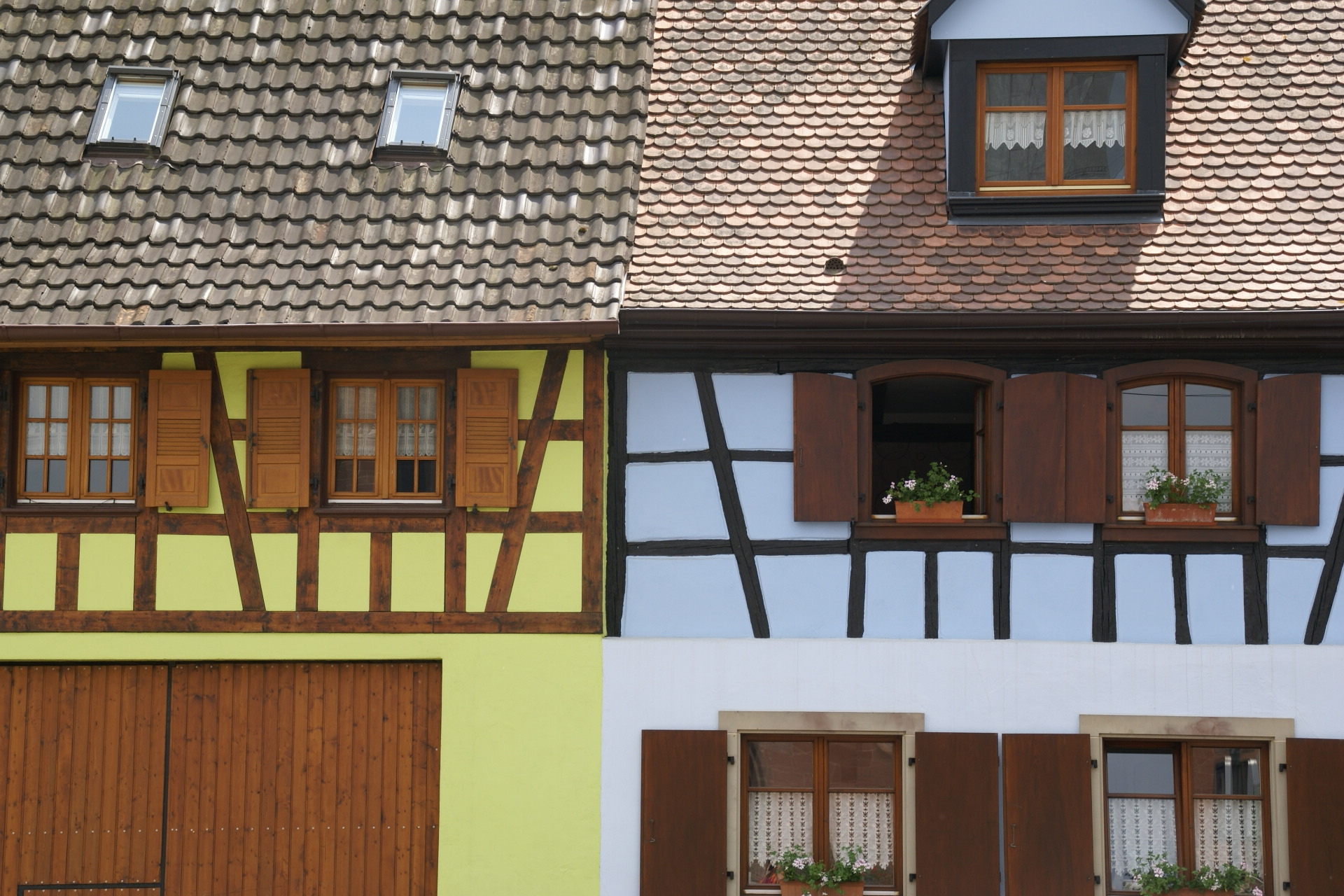
House facades

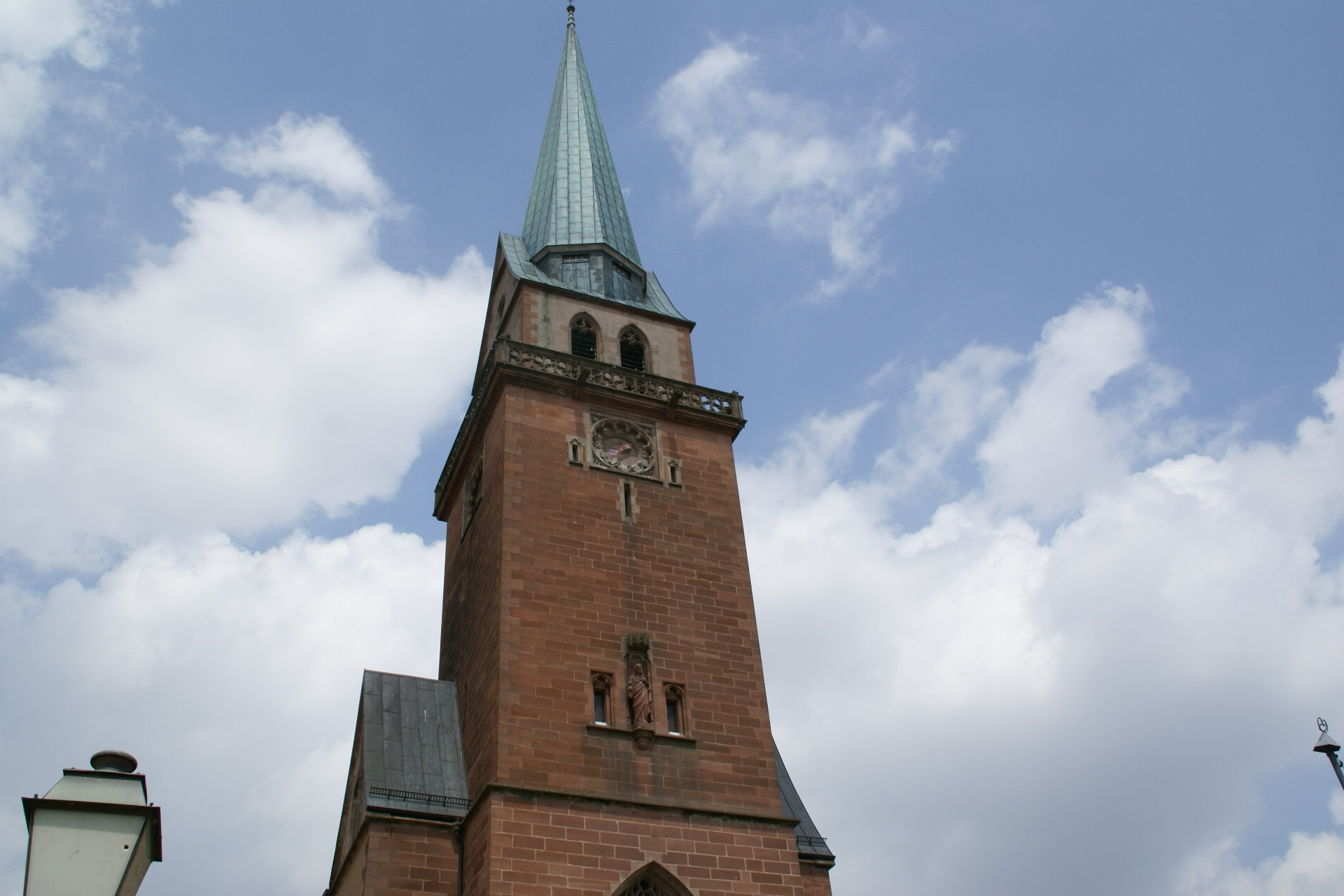
Catholic church Saint André

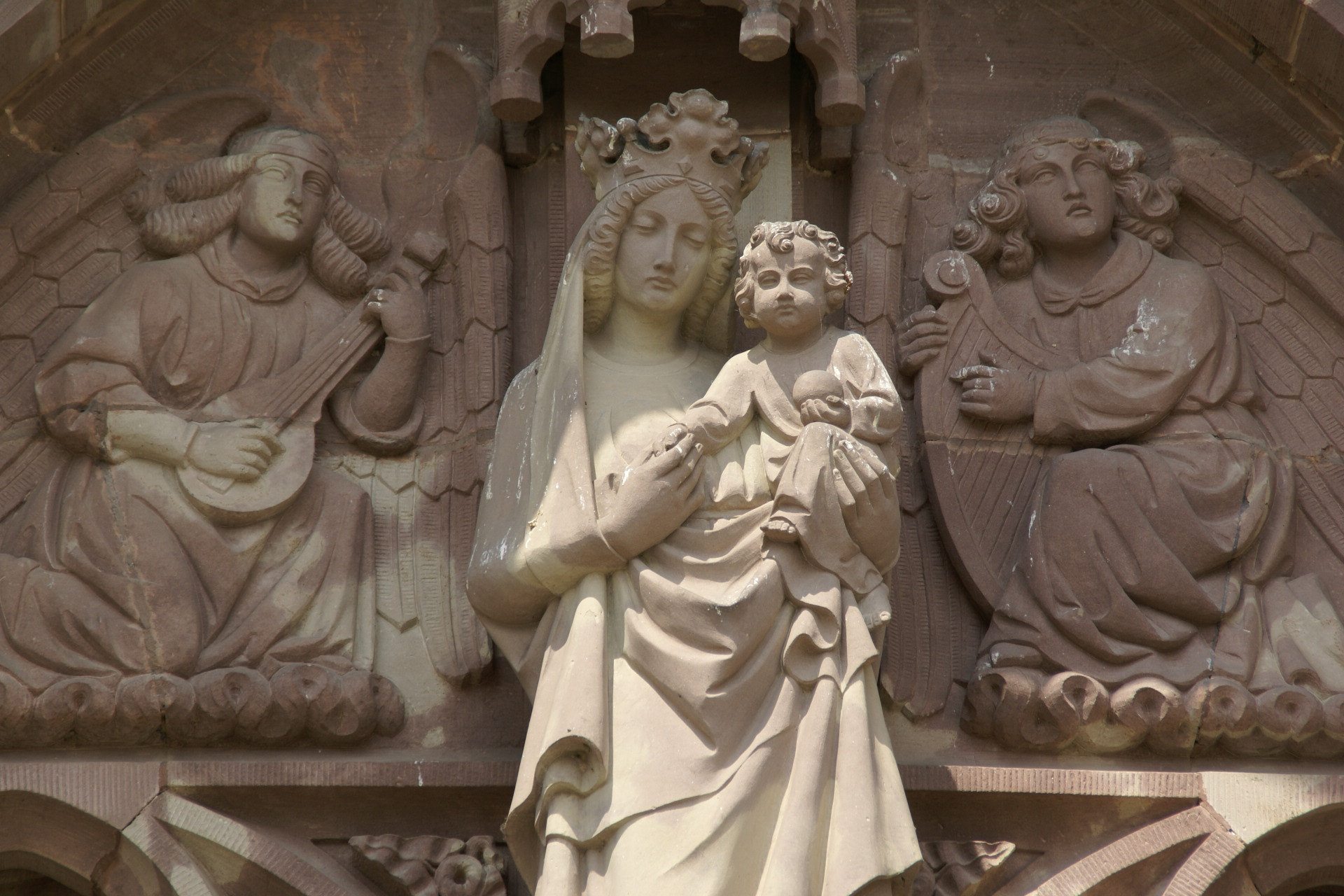
Madonna at the entrance lintel of Saint André

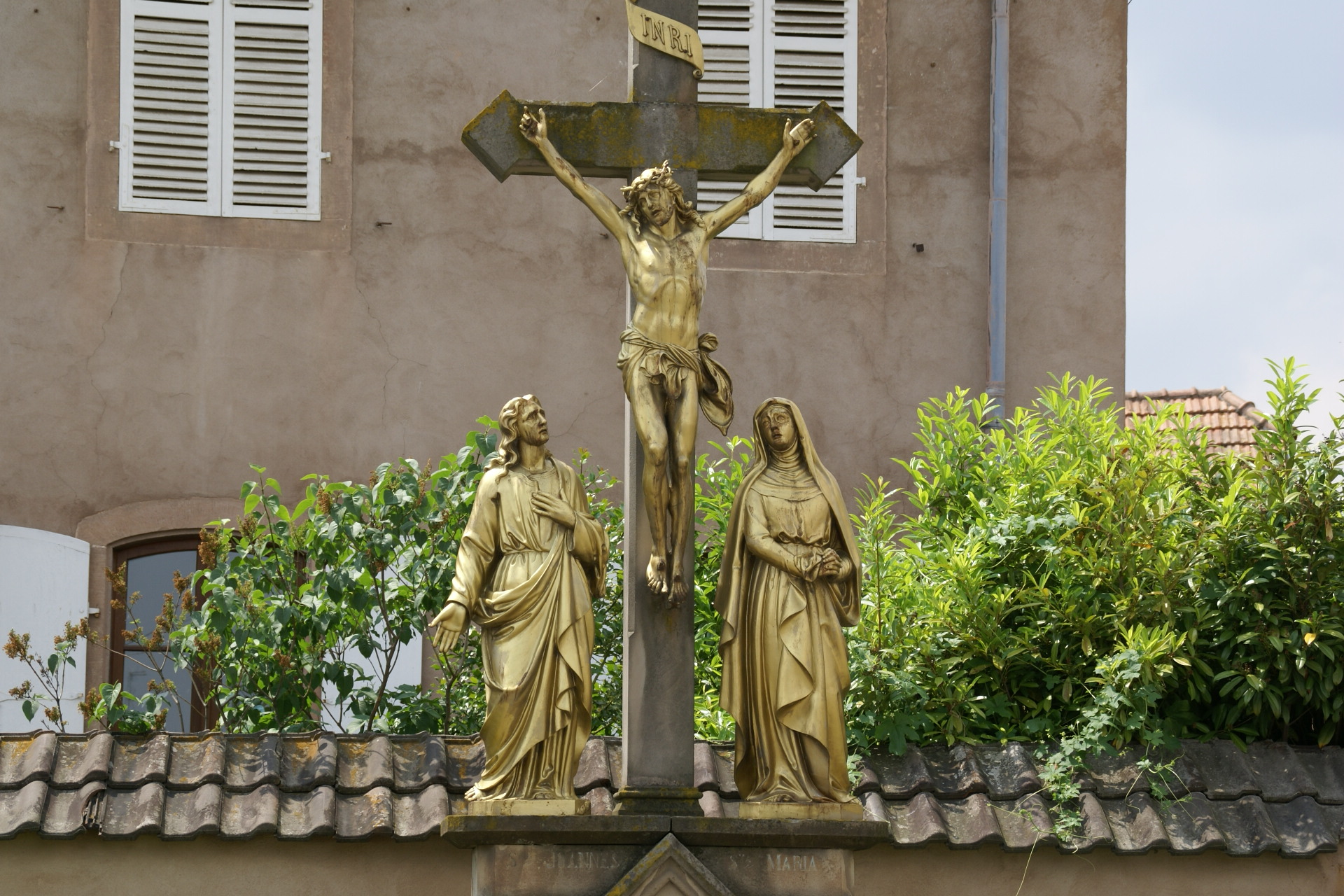
Crucifixion group at Rue de L'Eglise

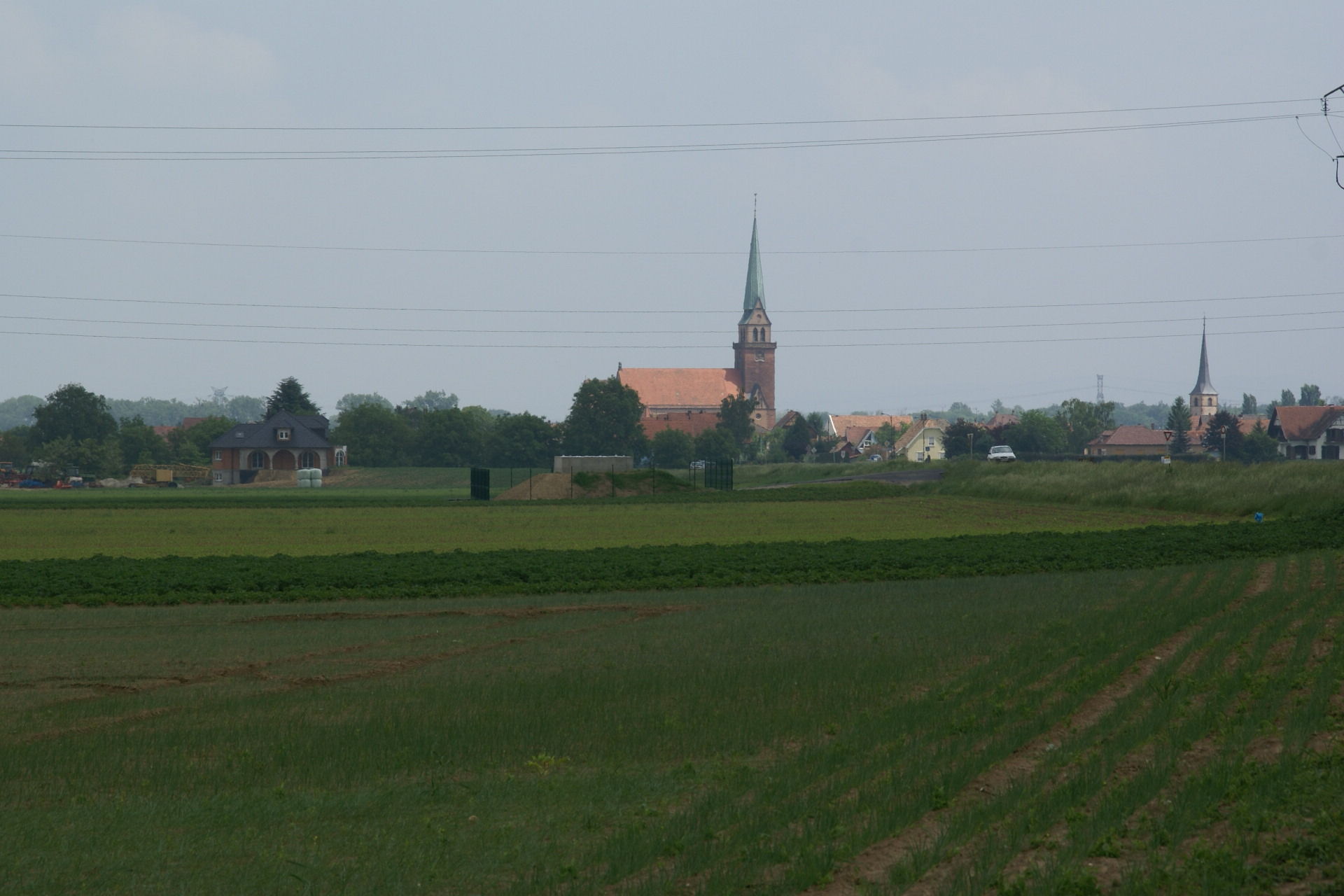
View of the town from Niedernai

== See also ==
- Communes of the Bas-Rhin department
