= Reichsfeld =

Reichsfeld Risfald
- Commune
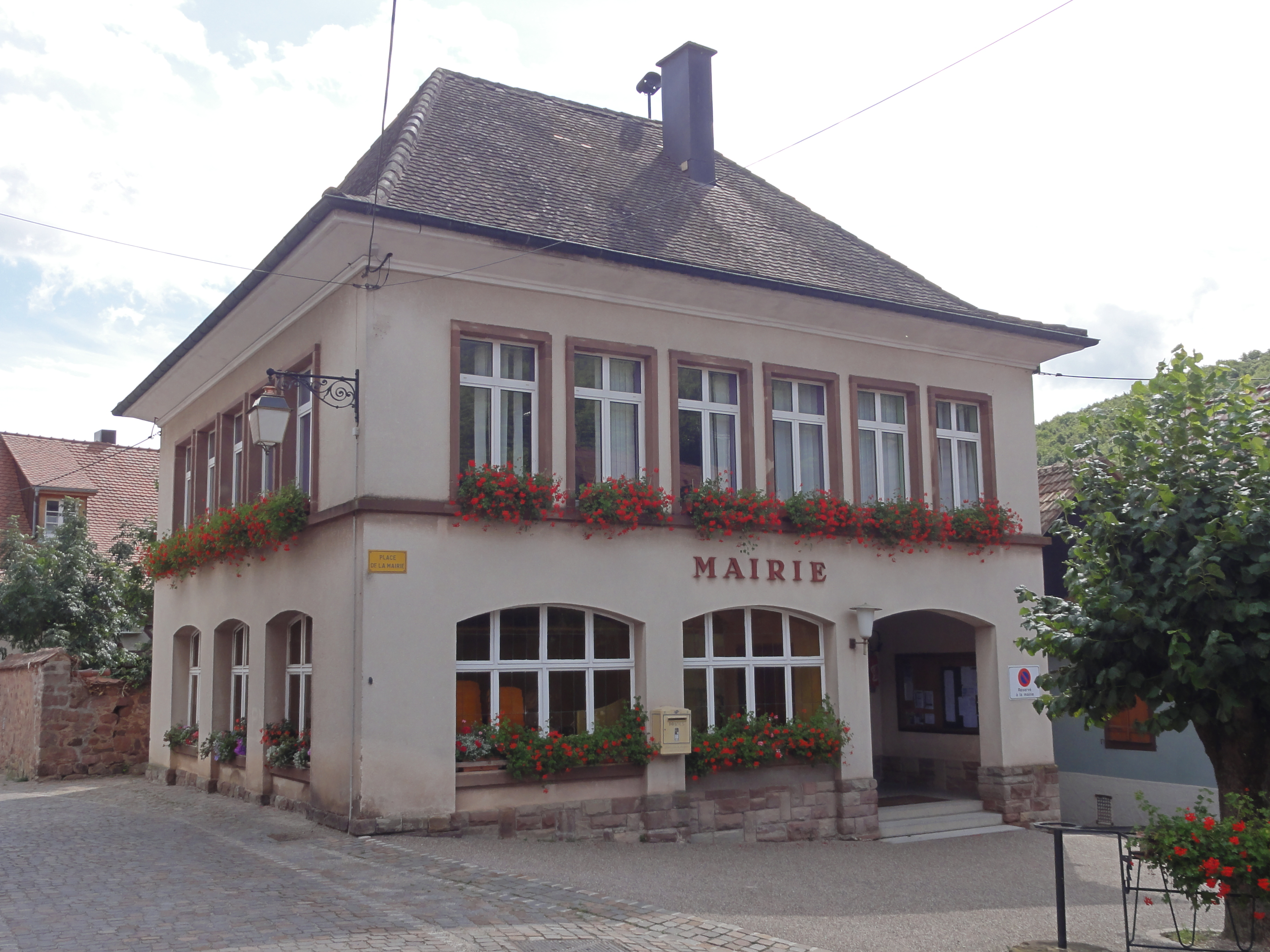
- The town hall in Reichsfeld

- Coat of arms
- Location of Reichsfeld
- Location within France Location within Grand Est
- Coordinates: 48°22′04″N 7°23′02″E
- Country: France
- Region: Grand Est
- Department: Bas-Rhin
- Arrondissement: Sélestat-Erstein
- Canton: Obernai

Government
  - Mayor (2020–2026): Vincent Kobloth
- Area^{1}: 4.95 km^{2} (1.91 sq mi)
- Highest elevation: 660 m (2,170 ft)
- Lowest elevation: 285 m (935 ft)
- Population (2023): 284
  - Density: 57.4/km^{2} (149/sq mi)
- Time zone: UTC+01:00 (CET)
  - Summer (DST): UTC+02:00 (CEST)
- INSEE/Postal code: 67387 /67140
- ^{1} French Land Register data, which excludes lakes, ponds, glaciers > 1 km^{2} (0.386 sq mi or 247 acres) and river estuaries.

Reichsfeld is a commune in the Bas-Rhin department in Alsace in north-eastern France.

== See also ==
- Communes of the Bas-Rhin department
