= Goxwiller =

Goxwiller Gogschwiller
- Commune
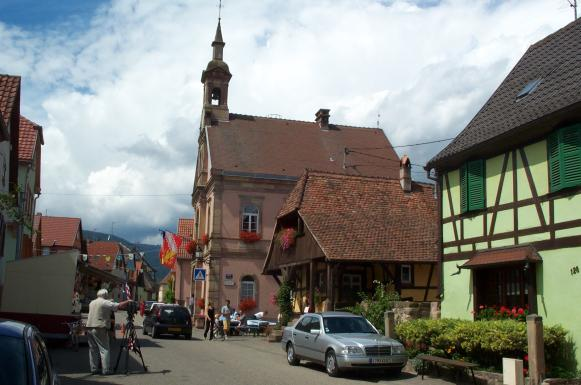
- The town hall in Goxwiller

- Coat of arms
- Location of Goxwiller
- Location within France Location within Grand Est
- Coordinates: 48°26′01″N 7°29′07″E
- Country: France
- Region: Grand Est
- Department: Bas-Rhin
- Arrondissement: Sélestat-Erstein
- Canton: Obernai

Government
  - Mayor (2020–2026): Suzanne Lotz
- Area^{1}: 3.3 km^{2} (1.3 sq mi)
- Highest elevation: 231 m (758 ft)
- Lowest elevation: 161 m (528 ft)
- Population (2023): 822
  - Density: 250/km^{2} (650/sq mi)
- Time zone: UTC+01:00 (CET)
  - Summer (DST): UTC+02:00 (CEST)
- INSEE/Postal code: 67164 /67210
- ^{1} French Land Register data, which excludes lakes, ponds, glaciers > 1 km^{2} (0.386 sq mi or 247 acres) and river estuaries.

Goxwiller (French pronunciation: [ɡɔksvilɛʁ]; German: Goxweiler) is a commune in the Bas-Rhin department in Alsace in north-eastern France.

== Geography ==
Goxwiller is effectively a one-street village between flat arable land to one side and southward sloping vineyards to the other. It has become known for viticulture and for traditional artisanal trades such as carpentry, clog making, leather tanning and book binding.

In recent decades aspects of the village have been sensitively renovated in order to encourage the tourist trade: the eighteenth century former bakery, which had fallen into disrepair, has been acquired by the local commune and is once again able to bake bread and Flammkuchen, albeit only on special occasions.

== History ==
From earliest times, Goxwiller and the neighbouring commune of Bourgheim comprised a single entity for administrative purposes both civil and ecclesiastical: the heraldic shield depicts two linked rings in order to symbolise this ancient union

First mentioned in 920 (initially as Getenesvillare, then as Gokesvilre, Gotesviller and finally as Goxwiller) the village was under the control of various abbeys during the medieval period, the last of these being the Abbey of Niedermunster to which Goxwiller was enfeoffed until 1522. From then until 1789 Goxwiller, along with the entire Lordship of Barr of which it by then formed a part, came under the authority of the city of Strasbourg. The early modern period was one of much warring and destruction across Alsace, but the nineteenth century was one of relative tranquility and growing prosperity: Goxwiller was one of several communes to benefit from the growth of viticulture during these years.

== See also ==
- Communes of the Bas-Rhin department
