= Itterswiller =

Itterswiller Itterschwiller
- Commune
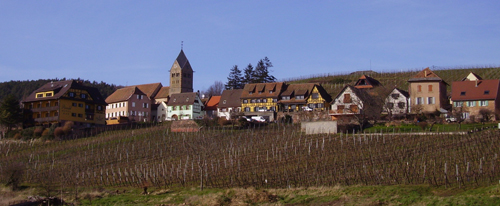
- A general view of Itterswiller

- Coat of arms
- Location of Itterswiller
- Location within France Location within Grand Est
- Coordinates: 48°21′53″N 7°25′54″E
- Country: France
- Region: Grand Est
- Department: Bas-Rhin
- Arrondissement: Sélestat-Erstein
- Canton: Obernai

Government
  - Mayor (2020–2026): Vincent Kieffer
- Area^{1}: 11.8 km^{2} (4.6 sq mi)
- Highest elevation: 287 m (942 ft)
- Lowest elevation: 220 m (720 ft)
- Population (2023): 215
  - Density: 18.2/km^{2} (47.2/sq mi)
- Time zone: UTC+01:00 (CET)
  - Summer (DST): UTC+02:00 (CEST)
- INSEE/Postal code: 67227 /67140
- ^{1} French Land Register data, which excludes lakes, ponds, glaciers > 1 km^{2} (0.386 sq mi or 247 acres) and river estuaries.

Itterswiller (French pronunciation: [itəʁsvilɛʁ]; German: Ittersweiler) is a commune in the Bas-Rhin department in Alsace in north-eastern France.

== Geography ==
The village is located on the eastern beginnings of the Vosges Mountains, between Molsheim to the north and Sélestat top the south. It is a few kilometres to the west of the Autoroute A35, the principal north-south highway in Alsace.

== Economy ==
Tourism is important to the local economy which is positioned on the Elsässer Weinstraße. The village also takes a pride in its vineyards.

== History ==
The village is on the course of a Roman road: it is therefore believed that the area must have been settled during the Roman Empire period. The name is thought to come from the Latin "Itineris villa" which indicates a hostelry for travellers.

In terms of surviving written records, a so-called Letter of Indulgence to Itterswiller dates from 1330.

== Celebrations ==
An annual church festival takes place at the end of September or start of October.

== See also ==
- Communes of the Bas-Rhin department
