= Canton of Obernai =

Coordinates: 48.46°N 7.48°E

- Canton
- Situation of the canton of Obernai in the department of Bas-Rhin
- Country: France
- Region: Grand Est
- Department: Bas-Rhin
- No. of communes: {{{nbcomm}}}
- Population (2023): 42,465
- INSEE code: 6712

The canton of Obernai is an administrative division of the Bas-Rhin department, northeastern France. Its borders were modified at the French canton reorganisation which came into effect in March 2015. Its seat is in Obernai.

It consists of the following communes:

1. Andlau
2. Barr
3. Bernardswiller
4. Bernardvillé
5. Blienschwiller
6. Bourgheim
7. Dambach-la-Ville
8. Eichhoffen
9. Epfig
10. Gertwiller
11. Goxwiller
12. Heiligenstein
13. Le Hohwald
14. Itterswiller
15. Krautergersheim
16. Meistratzheim
17. Mittelbergheim
18. Niedernai
19. Nothalten
20. Obernai
21. Reichsfeld
22. Saint-Pierre
23. Stotzheim
24. Valff
25. Zellwiller
