= Nothalten =

- Commune
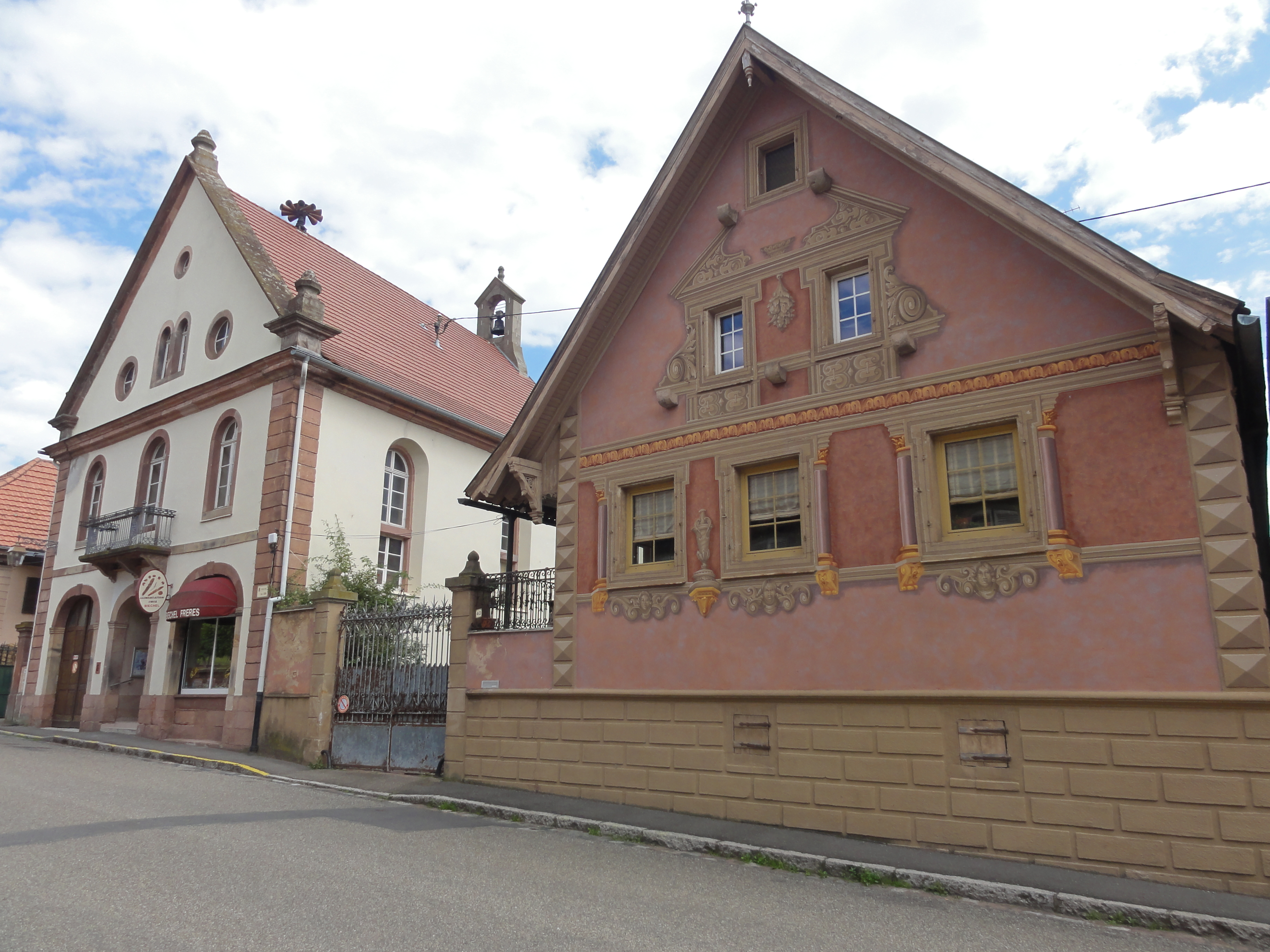
- The town hall in Nothalten

- Coat of arms
- Location of Nothalten
- Location within France Location within Grand Est
- Coordinates: 48°21′10″N 7°25′13″E
- Country: France
- Region: Grand Est
- Department: Bas-Rhin
- Arrondissement: Sélestat-Erstein
- Canton: Obernai
- Intercommunality: Pays de Barr

Government
  - Mayor (2020–2026): Marc Reibel
- Area^{1}: 4 km^{2} (1.5 sq mi)
- Highest elevation: 393 m (1,289 ft)
- Lowest elevation: 193 m (633 ft)
- Population (2023): 409
  - Density: 100/km^{2} (260/sq mi)
- Time zone: UTC+01:00 (CET)
  - Summer (DST): UTC+02:00 (CEST)
- INSEE/Postal code: 67337 /67680
- ^{1} French Land Register data, which excludes lakes, ponds, glaciers > 1 km^{2} (0.386 sq mi or 247 acres) and river estuaries.

Nothalten (French pronunciation: [notaltən]) is a commune in the Bas-Rhin department in Alsace in north-eastern France.

== See also ==
- Communes of the Bas-Rhin department
