= Zellwiller =

- Commune
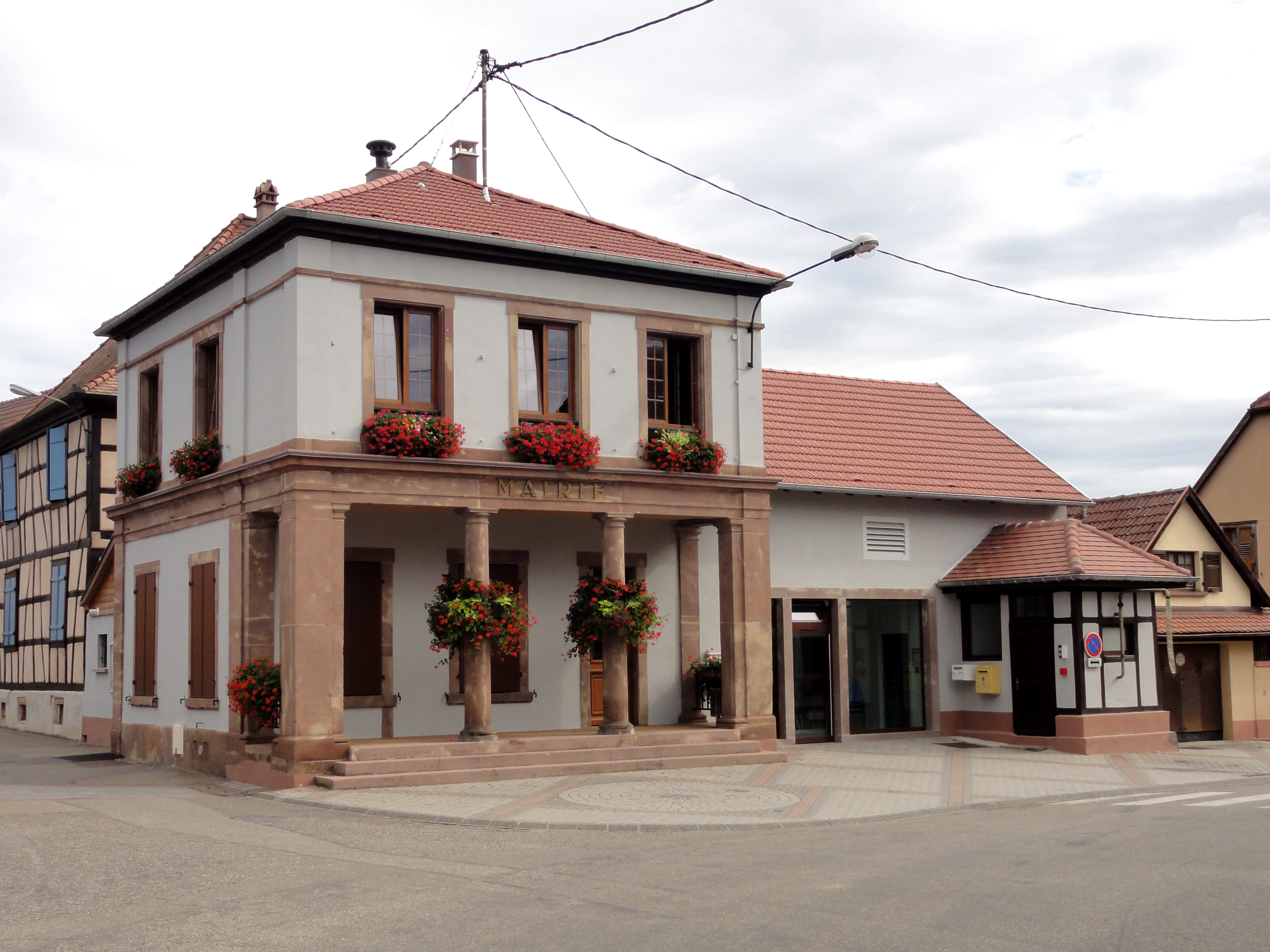
- The town hall in Zellwiller

- Coat of arms
- Location of Zellwiller
- Location within France Location within Grand Est
- Coordinates: 48°23′55″N 7°29′55″E
- Country: France
- Region: Grand Est
- Department: Bas-Rhin
- Arrondissement: Sélestat-Erstein
- Canton: Obernai
- Intercommunality: Pays de Barr

Government
  - Mayor (2020–2026): Denis Heitz
- Area^{1}: 8.79 km^{2} (3.39 sq mi)
- Highest elevation: 186 m (610 ft)
- Lowest elevation: 153 m (502 ft)
- Population (2023): 808
  - Density: 91.9/km^{2} (238/sq mi)
- Demonym(s): Zellwillerois, Zellwilleroises
- Time zone: UTC+01:00 (CET)
  - Summer (DST): UTC+02:00 (CEST)
- INSEE/Postal code: 67557 /67140
- ^{1} French Land Register data, which excludes lakes, ponds, glaciers > 1 km^{2} (0.386 sq mi or 247 acres) and river estuaries.

Zellwiller (German: Zellweiler) is a commune in the Bas-Rhin department in Alsace in northeastern France. The footballer Morgan Schneiderlin was born here.

== Population ==
Historical population

Year	Pop.	±% p.a.
1793	800	—
1800	935	+2.25%
1806	895	−0.73%
1821	1,057	+1.12%
1831	1,137	+0.73%
1836	1,183	+0.80%
1841	1,170	−0.22%
1846	1,144	−0.45%
1851	1,128	−0.28%
1856	1,165	+0.65%
1861	1,197	+0.54%
1866	1,144	−0.90%
1871	1,090	−0.96%
1875	1,089	−0.02%
1880	1,073	−0.30%
1885	1,048	−0.47%
1890	1,037	−0.21%
1895	995	−0.82%
1900	935	−1.24%

Year	Pop.	±% p.a.
1905	883	−1.14%
1910	836	−1.09%
1921	720	−1.35%
1926	683	−1.05%
1931	695	+0.35%
1936	681	−0.41%
1946	661	−0.30%
1954	600	−1.20%
1962	596	−0.08%
1968	621	+0.69%
1975	610	−0.25%
1982	692	+1.82%
1990	675	−0.31%
1999	723	+0.77%
2007	725	+0.03%
2012	729	+0.11%
2017	794	+1.72%
2023	808	+0.29%

Source: EHESS (1793-1999) and INSEE

== See also ==
- Communes of the Bas-Rhin department
