= Blienschwiller =

Blienschwiller Bleschwiller
- Commune
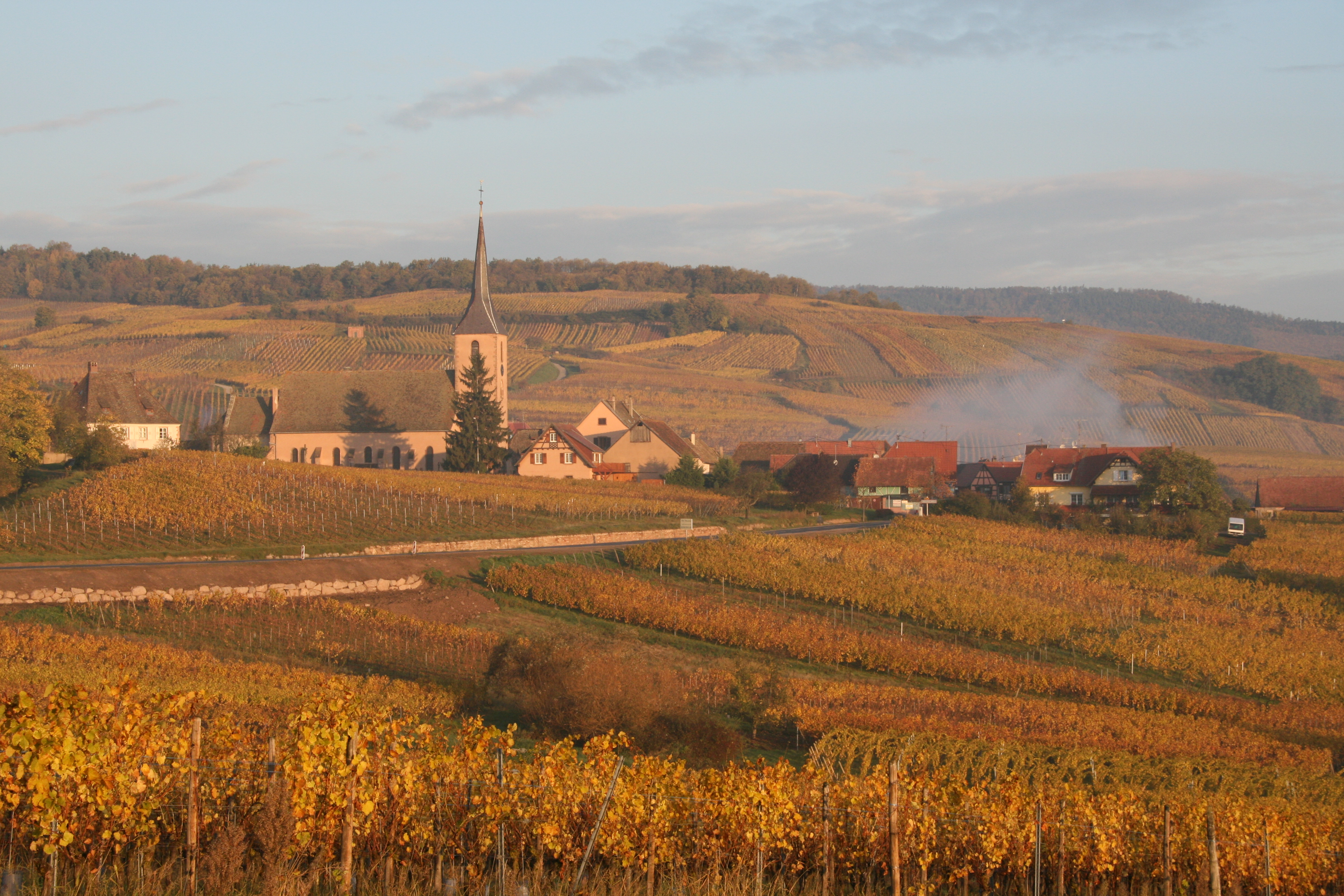
- A general view of Blienschwiller

- Coat of arms
- Location of Blienschwiller
- Location within France Location within Grand Est
- Coordinates: 48°20′32″N 7°25′09″E
- Country: France
- Region: Grand Est
- Department: Bas-Rhin
- Arrondissement: Sélestat-Erstein
- Canton: Obernai

Government
  - Mayor (2020–2026): Jean-Marie Sohler
- Area^{1}: 3.07 km^{2} (1.19 sq mi)
- Highest elevation: 411 m (1,348 ft)
- Lowest elevation: 189 m (620 ft)
- Population (2023): 300
  - Density: 98/km^{2} (250/sq mi)
- Time zone: UTC+01:00 (CET)
  - Summer (DST): UTC+02:00 (CEST)
- INSEE/Postal code: 67051 /67650
- ^{1} French Land Register data, which excludes lakes, ponds, glaciers > 1 km^{2} (0.386 sq mi or 247 acres) and river estuaries.

Blienschwiller (French pronunciation: [blinʃvilɛʁ]; German: Blienschweiler) is a commune in the Bas-Rhin department in Alsace in northeastern France.

== Population ==
Historical population
Year	Pop.	±% p.a.
1968	365	—
1975	350	−0.60%
1982	304	−1.99%
1990	292	−0.50%
1999	288	−0.15%
2007	306	+0.76%
2012	334	+1.77%
2017	321	−0.79%
2023	300	−1.12%
Source: INSEE

== See also ==
- Communes of the Bas-Rhin department
