= Bernardvillé =

- Commune
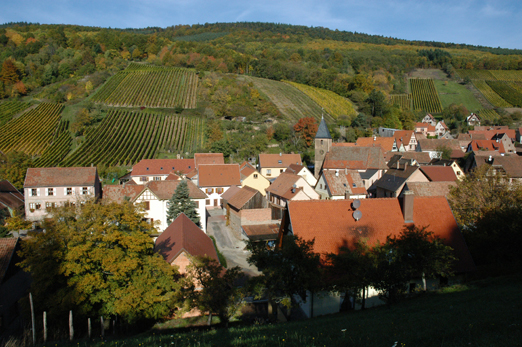
- A general view of Bernardvillé

- Coat of arms
- Location of Bernardvillé
- Location within France Location within Grand Est
- Coordinates: 48°22′14″N 7°24′08″E
- Country: France
- Region: Grand Est
- Department: Bas-Rhin
- Arrondissement: Sélestat-Erstein
- Canton: Obernai

Government
  - Mayor (2020–2026): André Risch
- Area^{1}: 2.76 km^{2} (1.07 sq mi)
- Highest elevation: 560 m (1,840 ft)
- Lowest elevation: 247 m (810 ft)
- Population (2023): 197
  - Density: 71.4/km^{2} (185/sq mi)
- Time zone: UTC+01:00 (CET)
  - Summer (DST): UTC+02:00 (CEST)
- INSEE/Postal code: 67032 /67140
- ^{1} French Land Register data, which excludes lakes, ponds, glaciers > 1 km^{2} (0.386 sq mi or 247 acres) and river estuaries.

Bernardvillé (French pronunciation: [bɛʁnaʁvile]; German: Bernhardsweiler) is a commune in the Bas-Rhin department in Alsace in northeastern France.

== Population ==
Historical population
Year	Pop.	±% p.a.
1968	194	—
1975	188	−0.45%
1982	146	−3.55%
1990	187	+3.14%
1999	199	+0.69%
2007	207	+0.49%
2012	218	+1.04%
2017	231	+1.17%
2023	197	−2.62%
Source: INSEE

== See also ==
- Communes of the Bas-Rhin department
