= Gertwiller =

- Commune
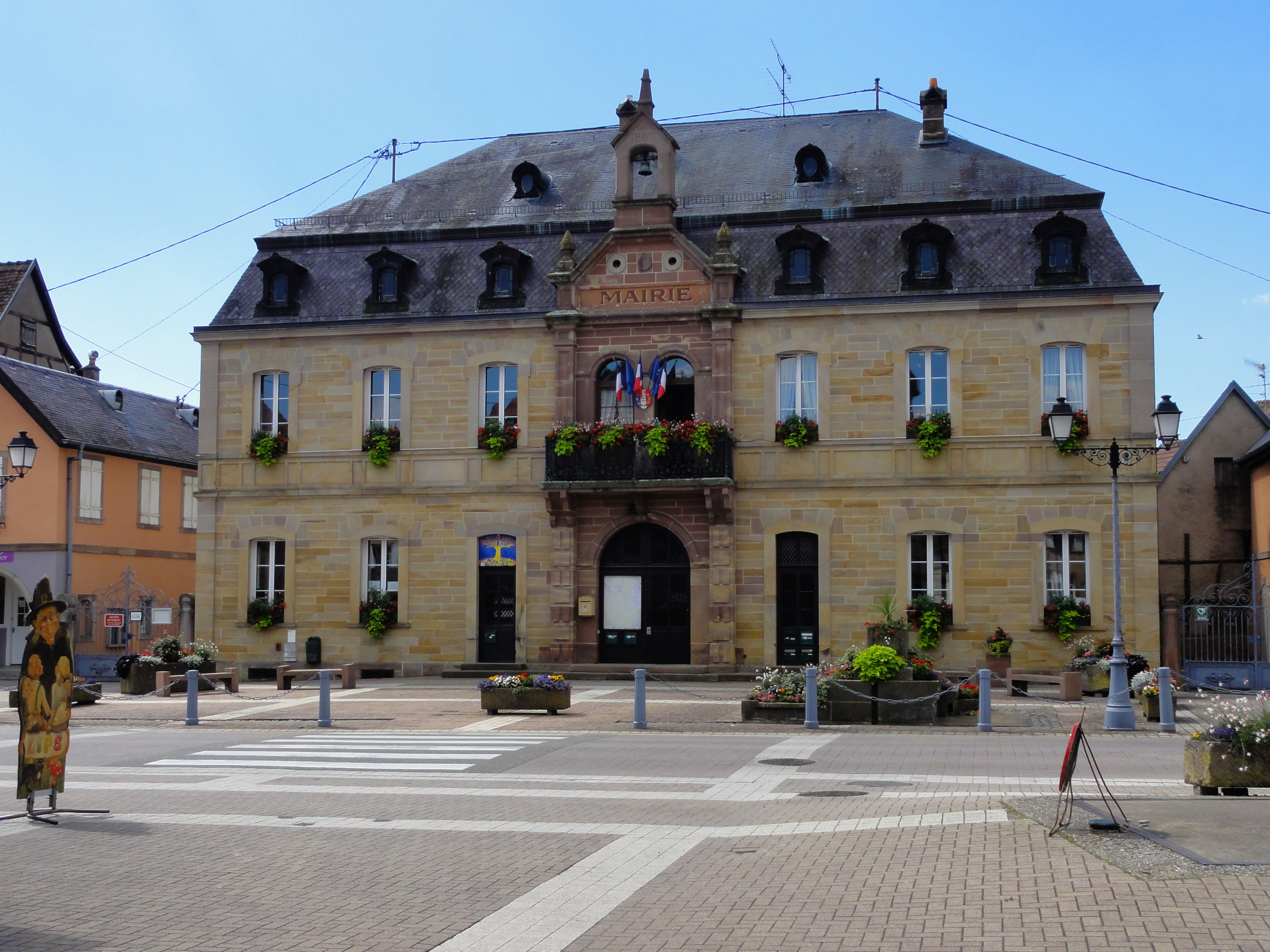
- The town hall in Gertwiller

- Coat of arms
- Location of Gertwiller
- Location within France Location within Grand Est
- Coordinates: 48°24′42″N 7°28′07″E
- Country: France
- Region: Grand Est
- Department: Bas-Rhin
- Arrondissement: Sélestat-Erstein
- Canton: Obernai

Government
  - Mayor (2020–2026): Rémy Huchelmann
- Area^{1}: 4.89 km^{2} (1.89 sq mi)
- Highest elevation: 245 m (804 ft)
- Lowest elevation: 165 m (541 ft)
- Population (2023): 1,282
  - Density: 262/km^{2} (679/sq mi)
- Time zone: UTC+01:00 (CET)
  - Summer (DST): UTC+02:00 (CEST)
- INSEE/Postal code: 67155 /67140
- ^{1} French Land Register data, which excludes lakes, ponds, glaciers > 1 km^{2} (0.386 sq mi or 247 acres) and river estuaries.

Gertwiller (German: Gertweiler) is a commune in the Bas-Rhin department in Alsace in north-eastern France.

Positioned in the heart of the Alsace wine growing region, Gertwiller specialises in the manufacture of pain d'épices, a traditional sweet spicy confection not dissimilar from ginger bread. The tradition dates at least as far back as the eighteenth century, and by the start of the twentieth century there were at least 8 separate businesses manufacturing the speciality. Pain d'épice from Gertwiller became famous through the nineteenth and twentieth centuries and can be found at almost every village market or fête in the region. Although the breads are normally oval in shape, for lovers it is possible to buy heart shaped loaves. In its time Gertwiller has received the title of French capital of pain d'épice, in succession to more substantial settlements such as Rheims and Dijon. Although the business continues to thrive in Gertwiller, it is today concentrated in just two business one of which, 'Lips', opened in 1998 a museum dedicated to pain d'épice and popular art of the region.

== Geography ==
On the north eastern edge of Barr, Gertwiller is positioned close to Mont Sainte-Odile, not far from the Andlau valley on the edge of the Vosges Mountains.

The village is some 20 kilometres (12 mi) north of Sélestat and 8 kilometres (5 mi) south of Obernai. Gertwiller is traversed by the little River Kirkneck which joins the Andlau near to Valff.

== People ==
Lucien Blumer, painter, divides his time between Strasbourg and Gertwiller.

== See also ==
- Communes of the Bas-Rhin department
