= Mittelbergheim =

Mittelbergheim Mìttelbarige
- Commune
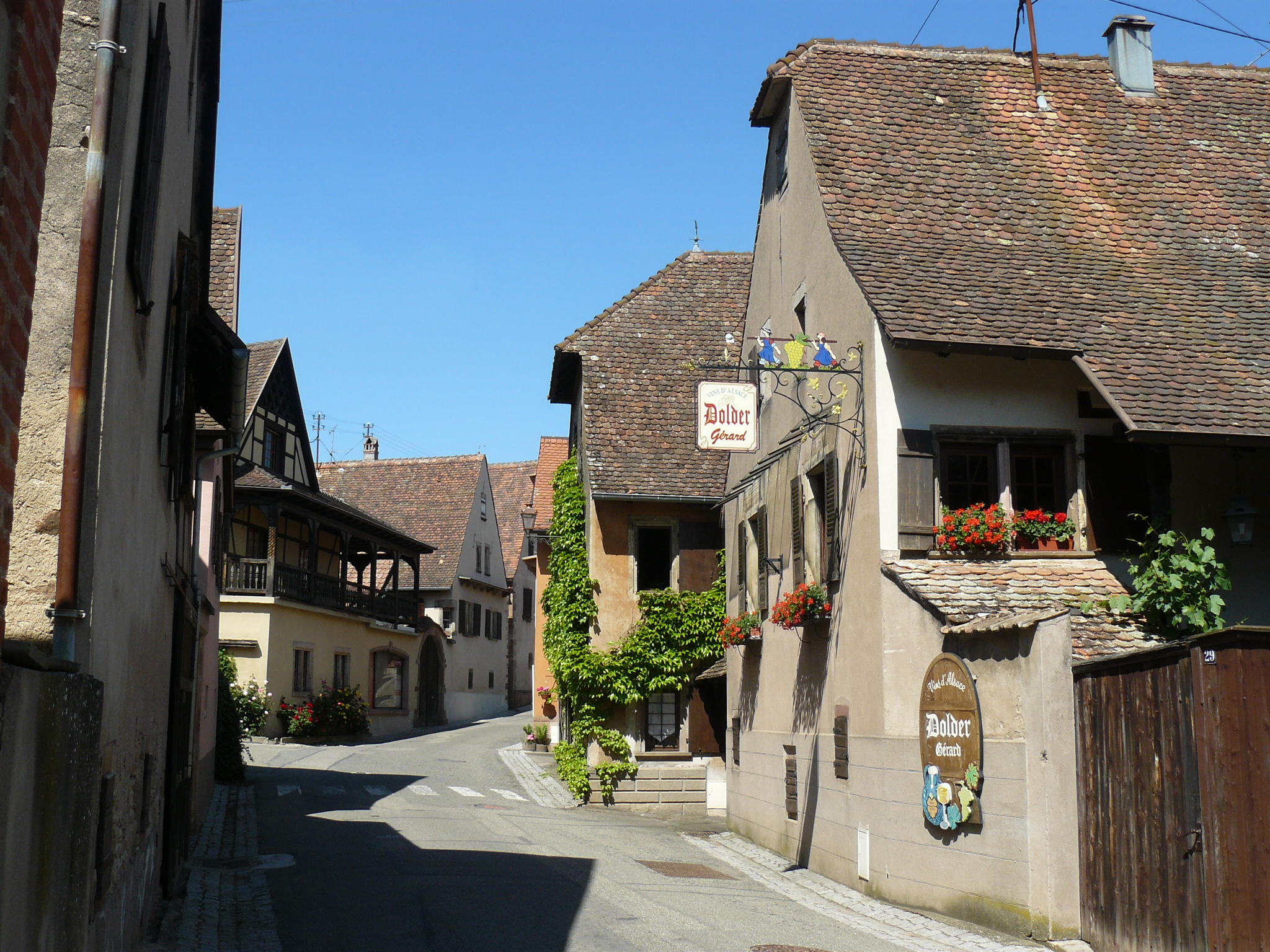
- Street in Mittelbergheim

- Coat of arms
- Location of Mittelbergheim
- Location within France Location within Grand Est
- Coordinates: 48°23′48″N 7°26′33″E
- Country: France
- Region: Grand Est
- Department: Bas-Rhin
- Arrondissement: Sélestat-Erstein
- Canton: Obernai

Government
  - Mayor (2020–2026): Marie-Josée Cavodeau
- Area^{1}: 3.83 km^{2} (1.48 sq mi)
- Highest elevation: 340 m (1,120 ft)
- Lowest elevation: 187 m (614 ft)
- Population (2023): 593
  - Density: 155/km^{2} (401/sq mi)
- Time zone: UTC+01:00 (CET)
  - Summer (DST): UTC+02:00 (CEST)
- INSEE/Postal code: 67295 /67140
- ^{1} French Land Register data, which excludes lakes, ponds, glaciers > 1 km^{2} (0.386 sq mi or 247 acres) and river estuaries.

Mittelbergheim is a commune in the Bas-Rhin department in Alsace in north-eastern France.

The village is a member of the Les Plus Beaux Villages de France ("The most beautiful villages of France") association.

Its vineyards produce one of the finest Alsacian wines: the Grand Cru Zotzenberg.

== See also ==
- Communes of the Bas-Rhin department
