= Bernardswiller =

Bernardswiller Batschwiller
- Commune
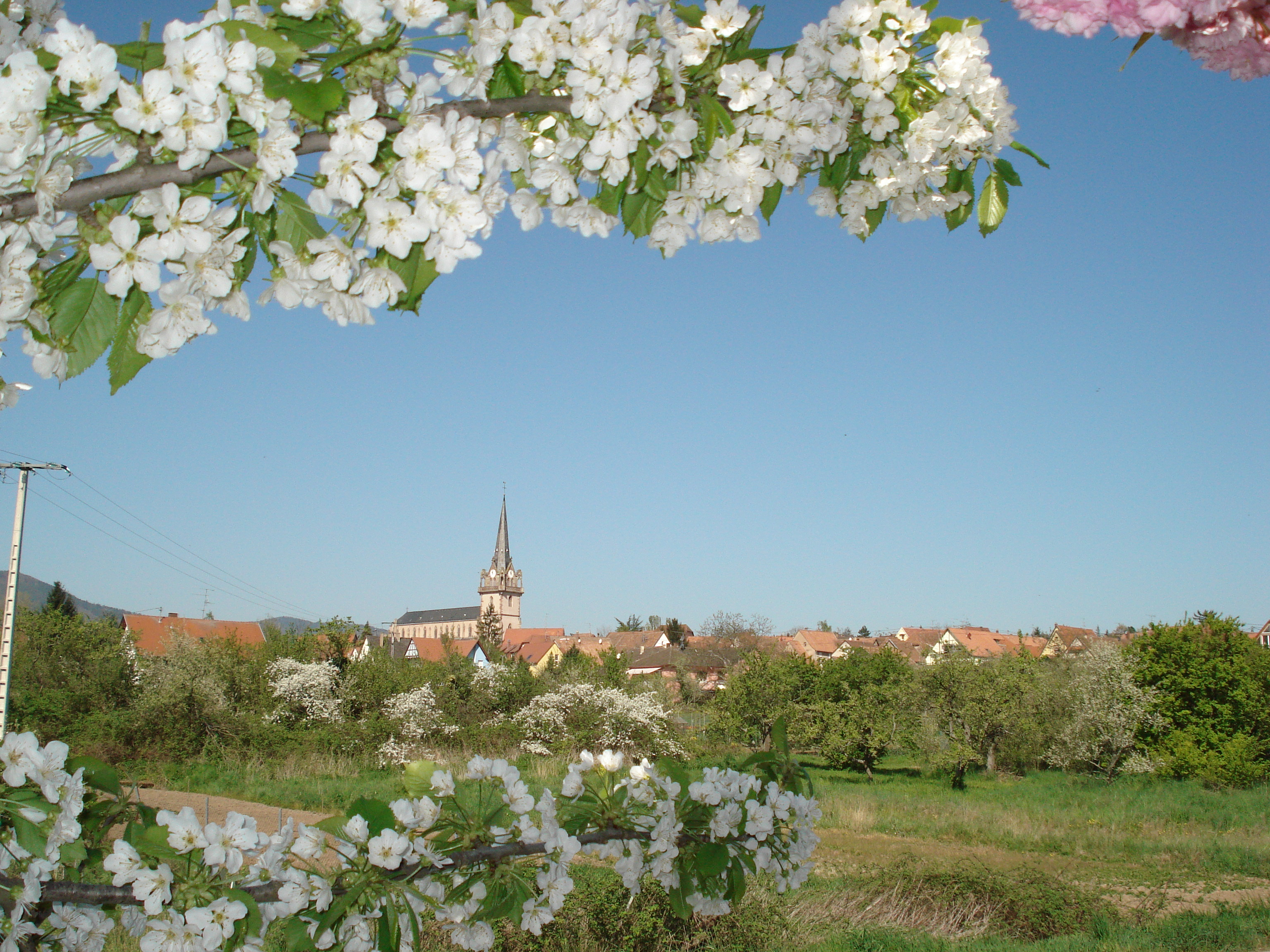
- A general view of Bernardswiller

- Coat of arms
- Location of Bernardswiller
- Location within France Location within Grand Est
- Coordinates: 48°27′15″N 7°27′55″E
- Country: France
- Region: Grand Est
- Department: Bas-Rhin
- Arrondissement: Sélestat-Erstein
- Canton: Obernai
- Intercommunality: Pays de Sainte-Odile

Government
  - Mayor (2020–2026): Norbert Motz
- Area^{1}: 5.53 km^{2} (2.14 sq mi)
- Highest elevation: 311 m (1,020 ft)
- Lowest elevation: 183 m (600 ft)
- Population (2023): 1,473
  - Density: 266/km^{2} (690/sq mi)
- Time zone: UTC+01:00 (CET)
  - Summer (DST): UTC+02:00 (CEST)
- INSEE/Postal code: 67031 /67210
- Website: www.bernardswiller.fr
- ^{1} French Land Register data, which excludes lakes, ponds, glaciers > 1 km^{2} (0.386 sq mi or 247 acres) and river estuaries.

Bernardswiller (German: Bernhardsweiler, Alsatian: Batschwiller) is a commune in the Bas-Rhin department in Alsace in northeastern France.

== Population ==
Historical population
Year	Pop.	±% p.a.
1968	989	—
1975	1,018	+0.41%
1982	1,031	+0.18%
1990	1,056	+0.30%
1999	1,220	+1.62%
2007	1,411	+1.83%
2012	1,425	+0.20%
2017	1,455	+0.42%
2023	1,473	+0.21%
Source: INSEE

== Heraldry ==
Coat of arms of Bernardswiller	Party: first half party per pale gules with a displayed eagle or, second plain sable.

== See also ==
- Communes of the Bas-Rhin department
