= Niedernai =

- Commune
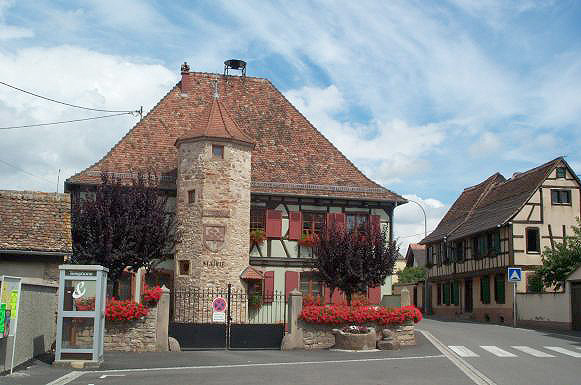
- The town hall in Niedernai

- Coat of arms
- Location of Niedernai
- Location within France Location within Grand Est
- Coordinates: 48°26′54″N 7°31′01″E
- Country: France
- Region: Grand Est
- Department: Bas-Rhin
- Arrondissement: Sélestat-Erstein
- Canton: Obernai
- Intercommunality: Pays de Sainte-Odile

Government
  - Mayor (2020–2026): Valérie Ruscher
- Area^{1}: 11.33 km^{2} (4.37 sq mi)
- Highest elevation: 182 m (597 ft)
- Lowest elevation: 152 m (499 ft)
- Population (2023): 1,225
  - Density: 108.1/km^{2} (280.0/sq mi)
- Time zone: UTC+01:00 (CET)
  - Summer (DST): UTC+02:00 (CEST)
- INSEE/Postal code: 67329 /67210
- ^{1} French Land Register data, which excludes lakes, ponds, glaciers > 1 km^{2} (0.386 sq mi or 247 acres) and river estuaries.

Niedernai (German: Niederehnheim) is a commune in the Bas-Rhin department in Alsace in north-eastern France. It is located 26 km south west of Strasbourg, 23 km north of Sélestat and 50 km north of Colmar on the main A35 road.

Niedernai dates back to pre-Roman times. In 707, it was part of the lands of the Feldkirch monastery, founded by the Benedictine monks of Moyenmoutier. From 1284, it was the seat of the Landsberg family, who built a fortified castle. The remnants of the castle can be seen in the "Glockenturm" watchtower.

The former Sainte Barbe church dates from 1741. By the 1850s it was too small for the congregation, so plans were begun for a new church. The parish church of Saint Maximin was built between 1891 and 1893. The former Sainte Barbe church is now a school.

Niedernai is characterised by traditional wood-framed houses.

== See also ==
- Communes of the Bas-Rhin department
