= Valff =

- Commune
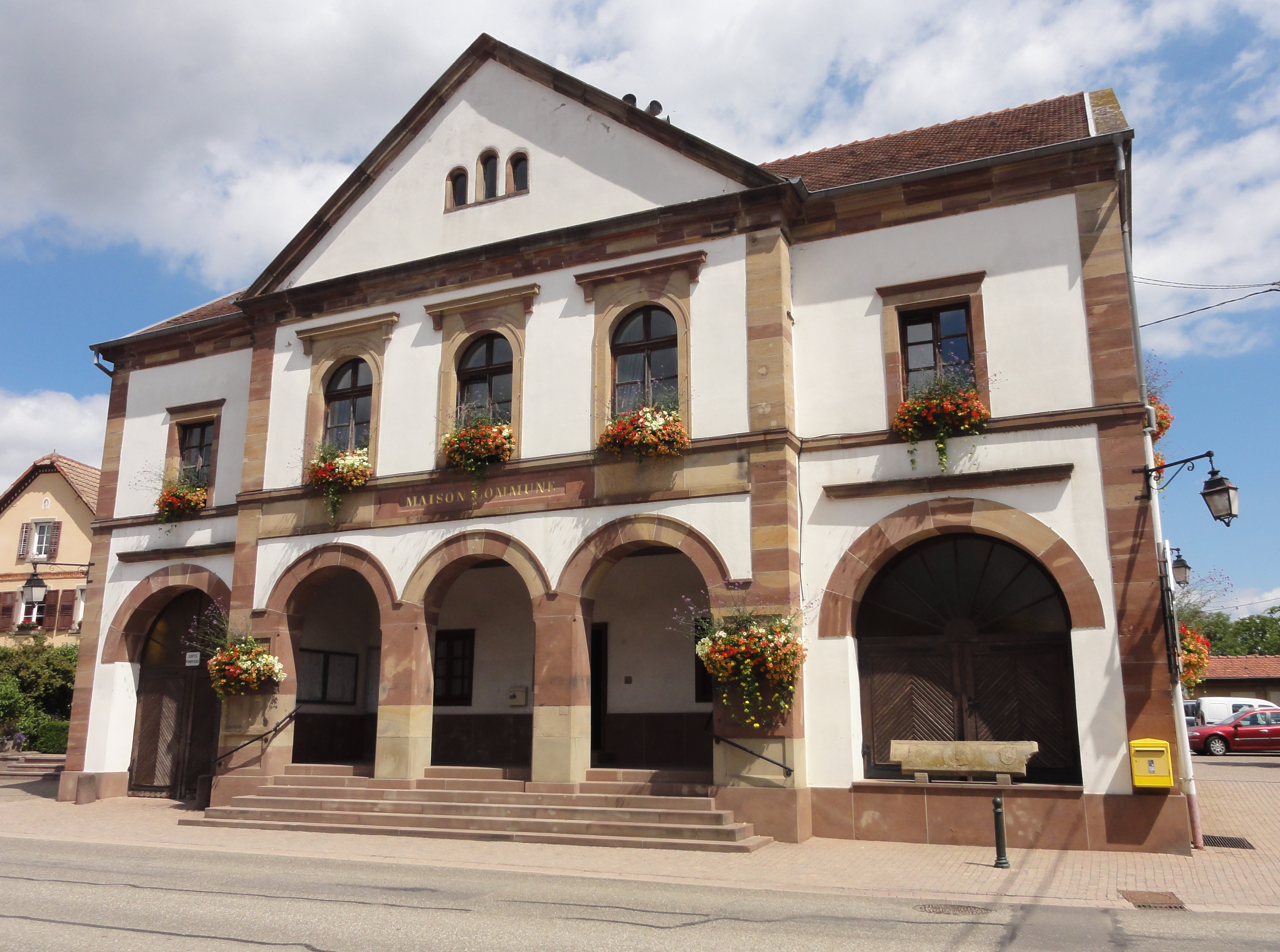
- The town hall in Valff

- Coat of arms
- Location of Valff
- Location within France Location within Grand Est
- Coordinates: 48°25′20″N 7°31′20″E
- Country: France
- Region: Grand Est
- Department: Bas-Rhin
- Arrondissement: Sélestat-Erstein
- Canton: Obernai

Government
  - Mayor (2020–2026): Germain Lutz
- Area^{1}: 10.91 km^{2} (4.21 sq mi)
- Highest elevation: 167 m (548 ft)
- Lowest elevation: 152 m (499 ft)
- Population (2023): 1,357
  - Density: 124.4/km^{2} (322.1/sq mi)
- Time zone: UTC+01:00 (CET)
  - Summer (DST): UTC+02:00 (CEST)
- INSEE/Postal code: 67504 /67210
- ^{1} French Land Register data, which excludes lakes, ponds, glaciers > 1 km^{2} (0.386 sq mi or 247 acres) and river estuaries.

Valff (French pronunciation: [valf]; German: Walf) is a commune in the Bas-Rhin department in Alsace in north-eastern France.

== See also ==
- Communes of the Bas-Rhin department
