= Heiligenstein =

- Commune
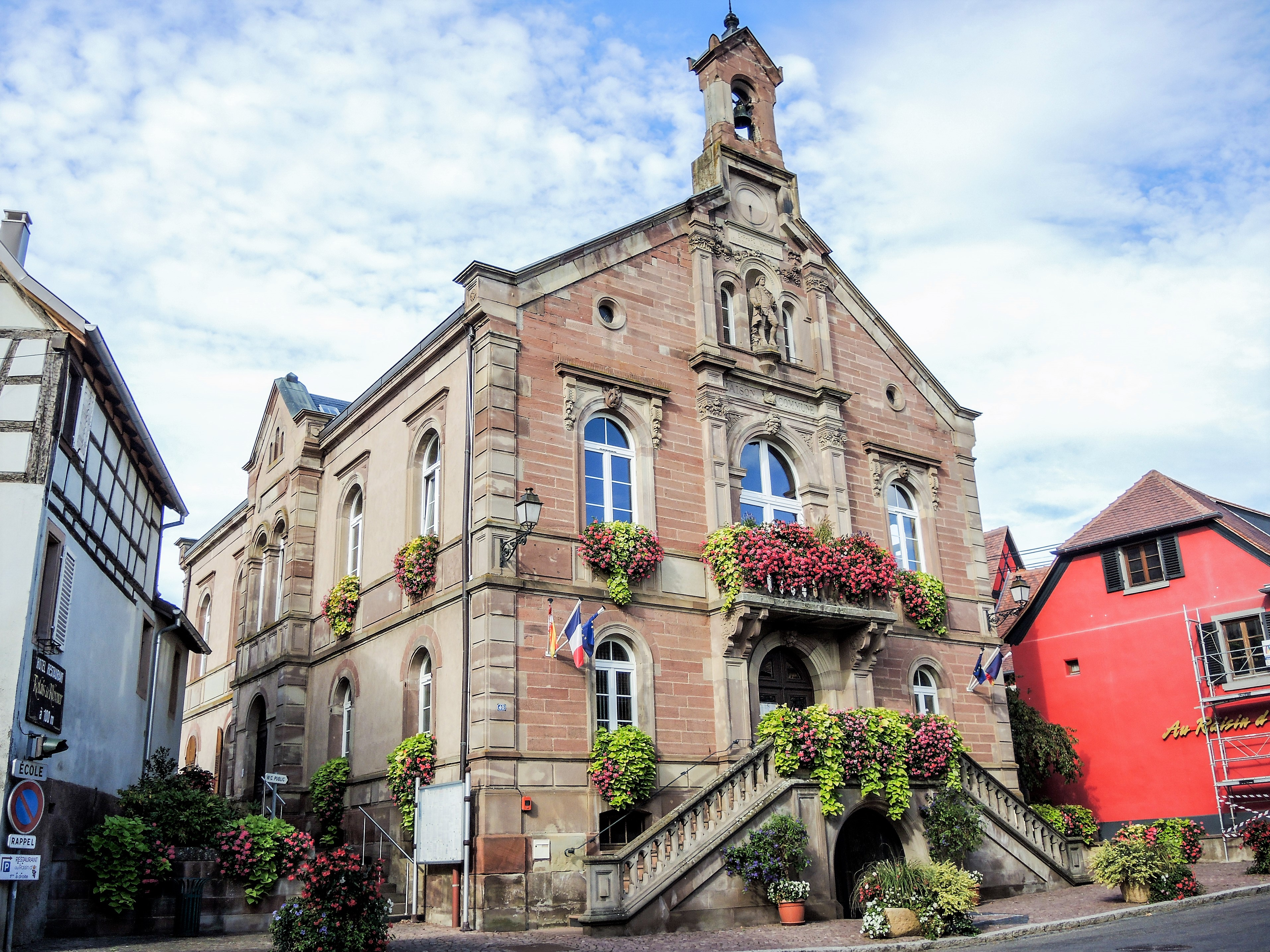
- The town hall in Heiligenstein

- Coat of arms
- Location of Heiligenstein
- Location within France Location within Grand Est
- Coordinates: 48°25′26″N 7°27′03″E
- Country: France
- Region: Grand Est
- Department: Bas-Rhin
- Arrondissement: Sélestat-Erstein
- Canton: Obernai

Government
  - Mayor (2020–2026): Jean-Georges Karl
- Area^{1}: 3.99 km^{2} (1.54 sq mi)
- Highest elevation: 640 m (2,100 ft)
- Lowest elevation: 189 m (620 ft)
- Population (2023): 925
  - Density: 232/km^{2} (600/sq mi)
- Time zone: UTC+01:00 (CET)
  - Summer (DST): UTC+02:00 (CEST)
- INSEE/Postal code: 67189 /67140
- ^{1} French Land Register data, which excludes lakes, ponds, glaciers > 1 km^{2} (0.386 sq mi or 247 acres) and river estuaries.

Heiligenstein (French pronunciation: [ailiɡənʃtain]) is a commune in the Bas-Rhin department in Alsace in north-eastern France. Its name means holy rock.

It lies some 15 kilometres (9 mi) to the north of Sélestat.

== See also ==
- Klevener de Heiligenstein, a wine from Heiligenstein and surrounding villages
- Communes of the Bas-Rhin department
