= Savagnin =

Variety of grape

- Grape (Vitis)
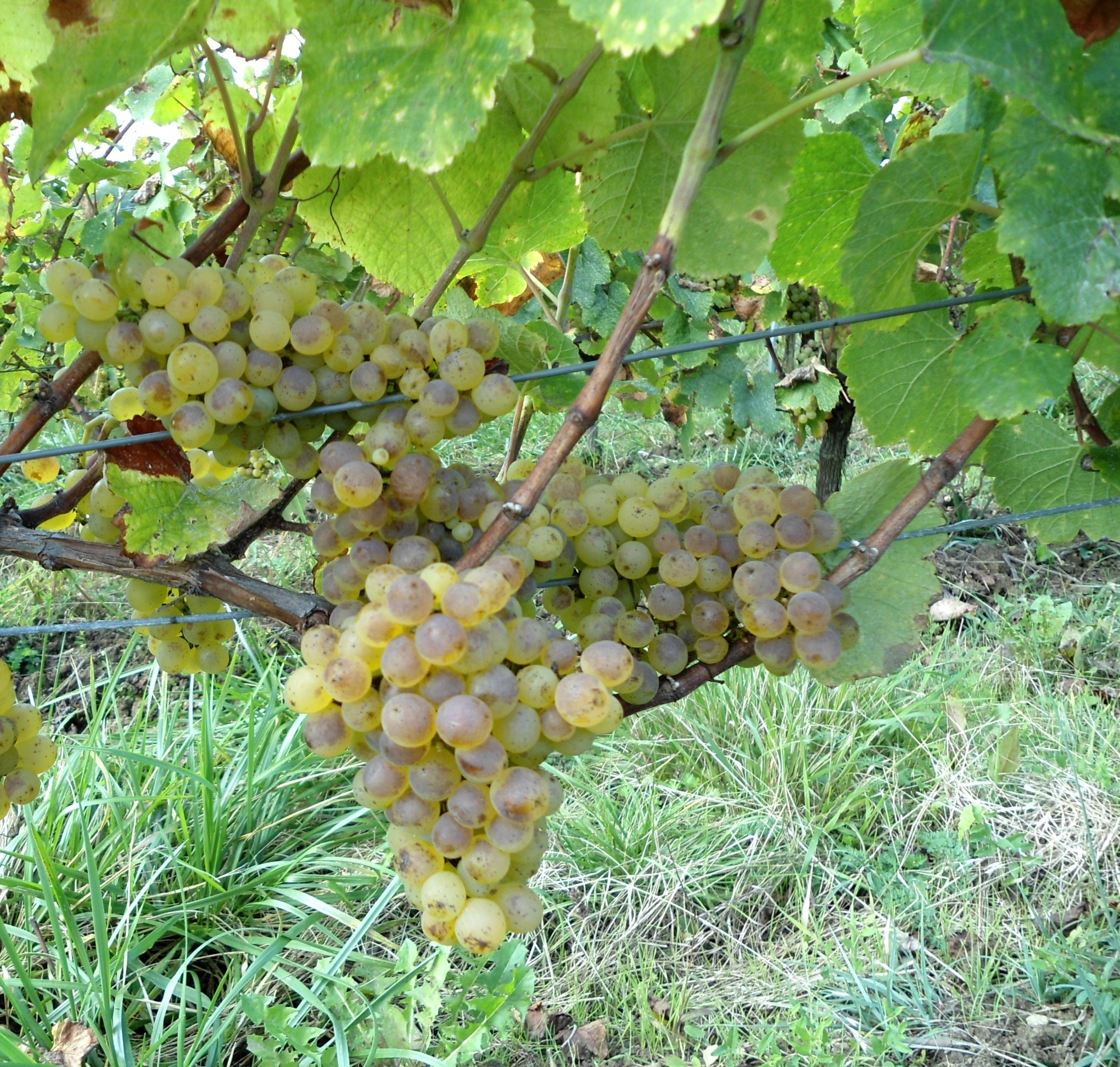
- Species: Vitis vinifera
- Also called: Traminer, Paien, Heida
- Origin: The Alps
- Notable regions: Jura, France
- Notable wines: Vin jaune, vin de paille
- VIVC number: 17636

Savagnin (French pronunciation: [savaɲɛ̃]) or Savagnin blanc is a variety of white wine grape with green-skinned berries. It is mostly grown in the Jura region of France, where it is made into Savagnin wine or the famous vin jaune and vin de paille.

== History ==
The history of Savagnin is complicated and not helped by its rather unstable genome. The story starts with the ancient Traminer variety, a green-skinned grape recorded in the Tyrolean village of Tramin from ca. 1000 until the 16th century. (This region now lies in the Italian province of South Tyrol). The famous ampelographer Pierre Galet thought that Traminer was identical to the green-skinned Savagnin blanc in the Jura. More recently it has been suggested that Savagnin blanc acquired slight differences in its leaf shape and geraniol content as it travelled to the other end of the Alps.

Frankisch in Austria, Heida and Païen in Switzerland, Furmint in Hungary and tramín bílý (brynšt) from Bohemia are all very similar to Savagnin blanc and probably represent clones of the Traminer family, if not Traminer itself. The Viognier of the Rhone Valley may be a more distant relative of Savagnin blanc.

At some point, either Traminer or Savagnin blanc mutated into a form with pink-skinned berries, called Red Traminer or Savagnin rose. Galet believed that a musqué ('muscat-like') mutation in the Red Traminer/Savagnin rose then led to the extra-aromatic Gewürztraminer, although in Germany these names are all regarded as synonymous.

Given that the wine made from 'Gewürztraminer' in Germany can be much less aromatic than that made in Alsace, some of the German vines may well be misidentified Savagnin rose. The Baden vineyard of Durbach claims its own type of Red Traminer called Durbacher Clevner (not to be confused with "Klevner", an Austrian synonym for Pinot blanc). The story goes that in 1780 Karl Friedrich, Grand Duke of Baden brought vines from Chiavenna in Italy, halfway between Tramin and the Jura, which was known to the Germans as Cleven.

The Klevener de Heiligenstein or Heiligensteiner Klevener found around Heiligenstein in Alsace may represent an outpost of the Durbach vines.

The varieties Aubin blanc and the Champagne grape Petit Meslier may be the result of a cross between Gouais blanc and Savagnin blanc.

== Distribution and wines ==
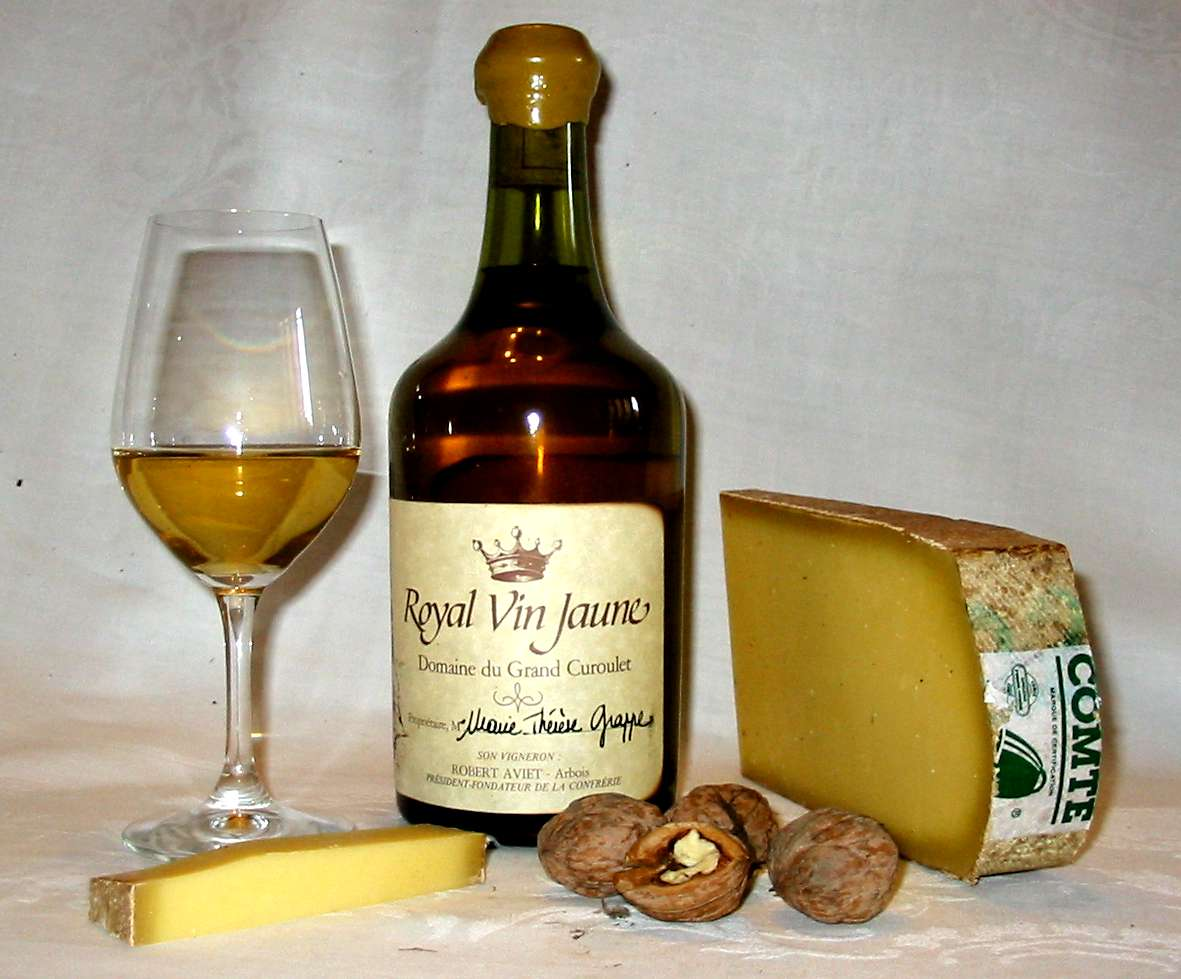
Vin Jaune

=== France ===
Savagnin blanc is mostly grown in the Jura. In 2007, total French plantations of the variety stood at 472 hectares (1,170 acres). It is most famous as the only grape allowed in the vin jaunes of Château-Chalon and L'Étoile, similar to fino sherry with a covering of flor but not fortified and without the use of the solera system. Savagnin is blended with Chardonnay to make a conventional dry white wine in L'Étoile and Côtes du Jura, the fortified Macvin du Jura, and a sparkling wine called Crémant du Jura.

It is also blended into Côtes du Jura vin de paille, a dessert wine made from grapes left to dry on straw.

The Gringet of Savoie has no link with Savagnin blanc.

=== Germany ===
Durbach is home to some plantings of Red Traminer in Germany with potentially more plantings from misidentified Gewürztraminer that may actually be Red Traminer.

=== Switzerland ===
Not surprisingly the Swiss Alps are home to a Traminer-like grape, called Heida, first recorded in 1586. The alternative name Païen or Paën may refer to an ancient, pre-Christian origin (pagan) or to pays (land) in the sense of local. Visperterminen in the Valais is home to some of the highest vineyards in Europe, where Heida is made into table and dessert wines.

=== Australia ===
In 2009 it was first discovered that grape growers and wine makers in Australia have been supplying and selling Savagnin wrongly labelled for several years. They thought they were pouring money into the market for the Spanish albarino grape, only to discover this is not the case. From 2009 vintage onward these wines have been labelled Savagnin.

A visiting French expert raised questions in 2008, and DNA testing confirmed that the grapes are in fact Savagnin sourced from Spanish cuttings. The variety itself may have originated in Spain or France.

== Vine and viticulture ==
Savagnin blanc is very late ripening, and may be picked as late as December. Like its cousin Gewürztraminer, it is a temperamental grape to grow, with low yields at the end of it.

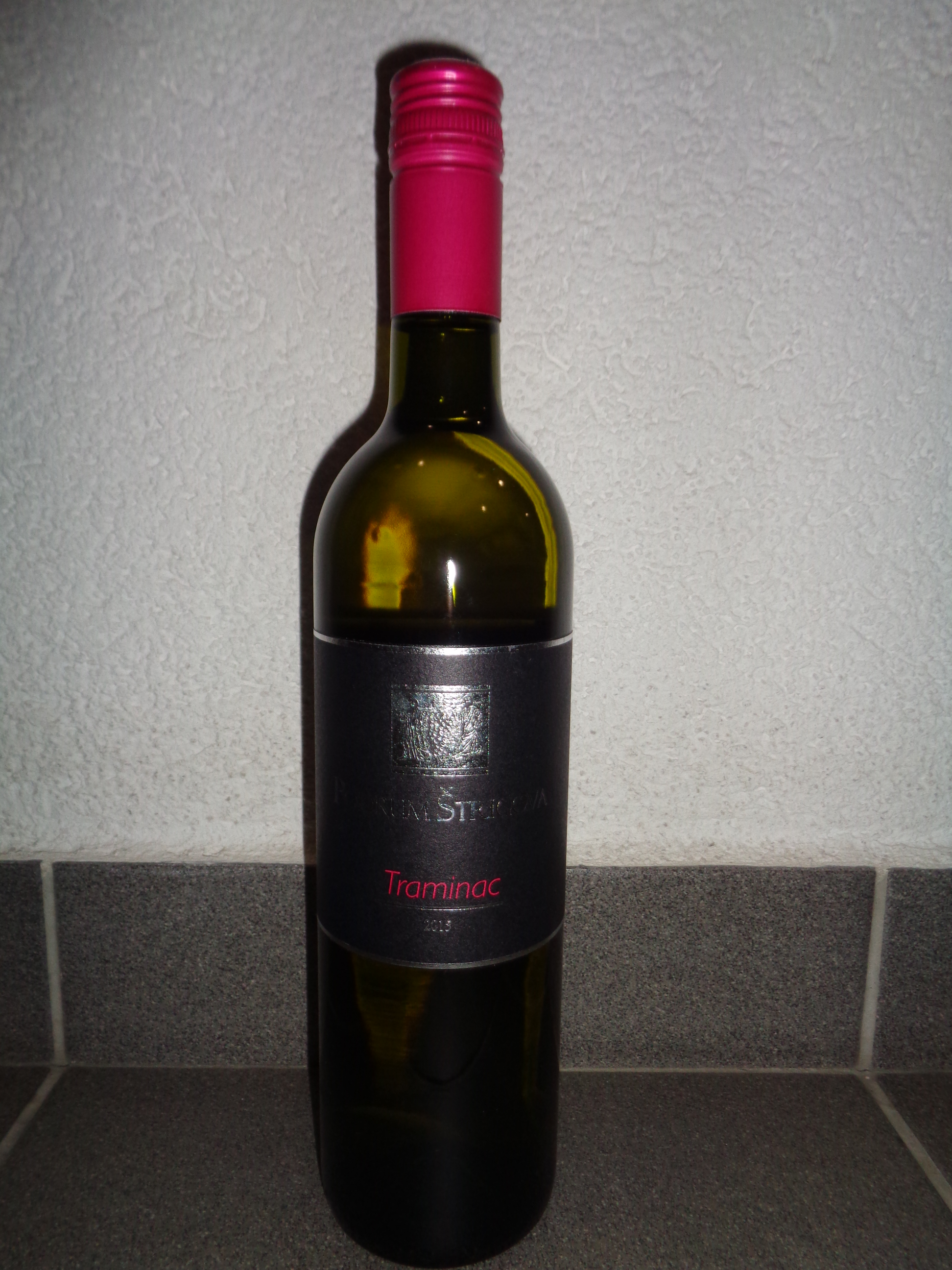
A bottle of Traminac wine from Croatia

== Synonyms ==
As explained above, genetic instability means that the Traminer/Savagnin group should be regarded as a family of related clones rather than distinct varieties. These are the synonyms currently listed by Geilweilerhof for Savagnin blanc :

Auvernat blanc, Bon blanc, Forment, Formentin blanc, Fraentsch, Fromenteau, Gentil blanc, Gruenedel, Princ Bily, Printsch Grau, Ryvola Bila, Schleitheimer, Servoyen blanc, Traminer D'Ore, Traminer Weiss, Traminac.

With the red mutant, the Geilweilerhof see no difference between it and Gewürztraminer - and some of the synonyms below may belong to the original green-skinned form.

Auvernas rouge, Blanc Brun, Blanc Court, Bon blanc, Christkindeltraube, Clevner, Crovena Ruzica, Dreimaenner, Dreimannen, Dreipfennigholz, Drumin, Duret rouge, Edeltraube, Fermentin rouge, Fleischweiner, Fourmenteau rouge, Frencher, Fromente, Fromenteau, Fuszeres, Gentil Rose Aromatique, Gentil-duret rouge, Gentile blanc, Gewuerztraminer, Gringet, Gris rouge, Haiden, Kirmizi Traminer, Klaebinger, Klaevner, Kleinbraun, Kleinwiener, Livora Cervena, Mala Dinka, Marzimmer, Mirisavi Traminac, Nature, Nature rose, Noble rose, Nuernberger Rot, Pinat Cervena, Piros Tramini, Plant Paien, Princ Cerveny, Princt Cervena, Ranfoliza, Rotclevner, Rotedel, Roter Nuernberger, Roter Traminer, Rotfranken, Rothklauser, Rothweiner, Rothwiener, Rotklaevler, Rotklaevner, Rotklevner, Rousselet, Rusa, Ruska, Ryvola, Salvagnin, Sauvagnin, Savagnin jaune, Savagnin Rosa Aromatique, Savagnin rose, St. Klauser, Termeno Aromatico, Tramin Cerveny, Tramin Korenny, Traminac Crveni, Traminac Diseci, Traminac Mirisavi, Traminer, Traminer Aromatico, Traminer Musque, Traminer Parfume, Traminer Rot, Traminer Rozovyi, Tramini Piros, Trammener.

== See also ==
- Vin jaune
- Savagnin Rose
