= Gewürztraminer =

Variety of grape

- Grape (Vitis)
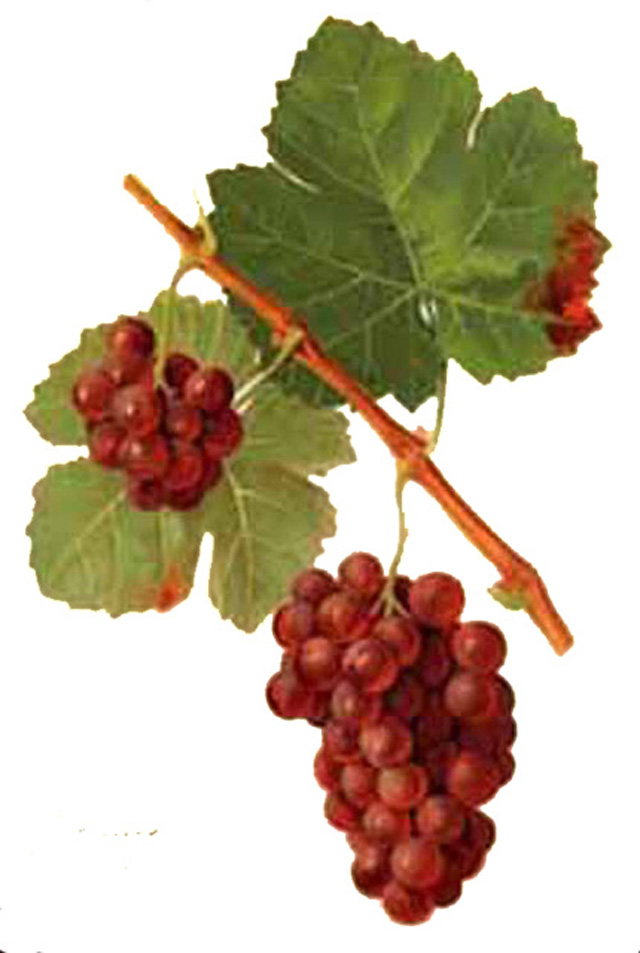
- Gewürztraminer in Viala & Vermorel
- Color of berry skin: Rose
- Species: Vitis vinifera
- Also called: Gewurztraminer, Traminec, Gewürz, Gertie, Gentil Rose Aromatique, Traminer Musque (more)
- Origin: Tramin, Italy
- Notable regions: Alsace, Germany, Northeast Italy, Macedonia, New Zealand, Switzerland, USA, Canada, Southern Australia, Somontano in Spain, Stellenbosch in South Africa, Trevelin (Patagonia Argentina)
- Notable wines: From Alsace, especially the Vendange Tardives
- VIVC number: 12609

Gewürztraminer vine and grapes

Gewürztraminer (German: [ɡəˈvʏʁtstʁaˌmiːnɐ]) is an aromatic wine grape variety, used in white wines, and which performs best in cooler climates. In English, it is sometimes referred to colloquially as Gewürz (/ɡəˈvʊərts, ɡəˈvɜːrts/ gə-VOORTS, gə-VURTS; although this is never the case in German, because Gewürz means 'herb' or 'spice'). In English and French it is usually written Gewurztraminer (without the umlaut). Gewürztraminer is a variety with a pink to red skin colour, which makes it a "white wine grape" as opposed to the blue to black-skinned varieties commonly referred to as "red wine grapes". The variety has high natural sugar and the wines are white and usually off-dry, with a flamboyant bouquet of lychees. Indeed, Gewürztraminer and lychees share the same aroma compounds. Dry Gewürztraminers may also have aromas of roses, passion fruit and floral notes. It is not uncommon to notice some spritz (fine bubbles on the inside of the glass).

== Etymology ==
The German name Gewürztraminer literally means 'spice Traminer' or 'perfumed Traminer', and is attested in Germany from the 16th century. This grape variety is a mutation of the Savagnin blanc, also known in German as the Traminer, from Tramin, the name of a village in South Tyrol.

== History ==
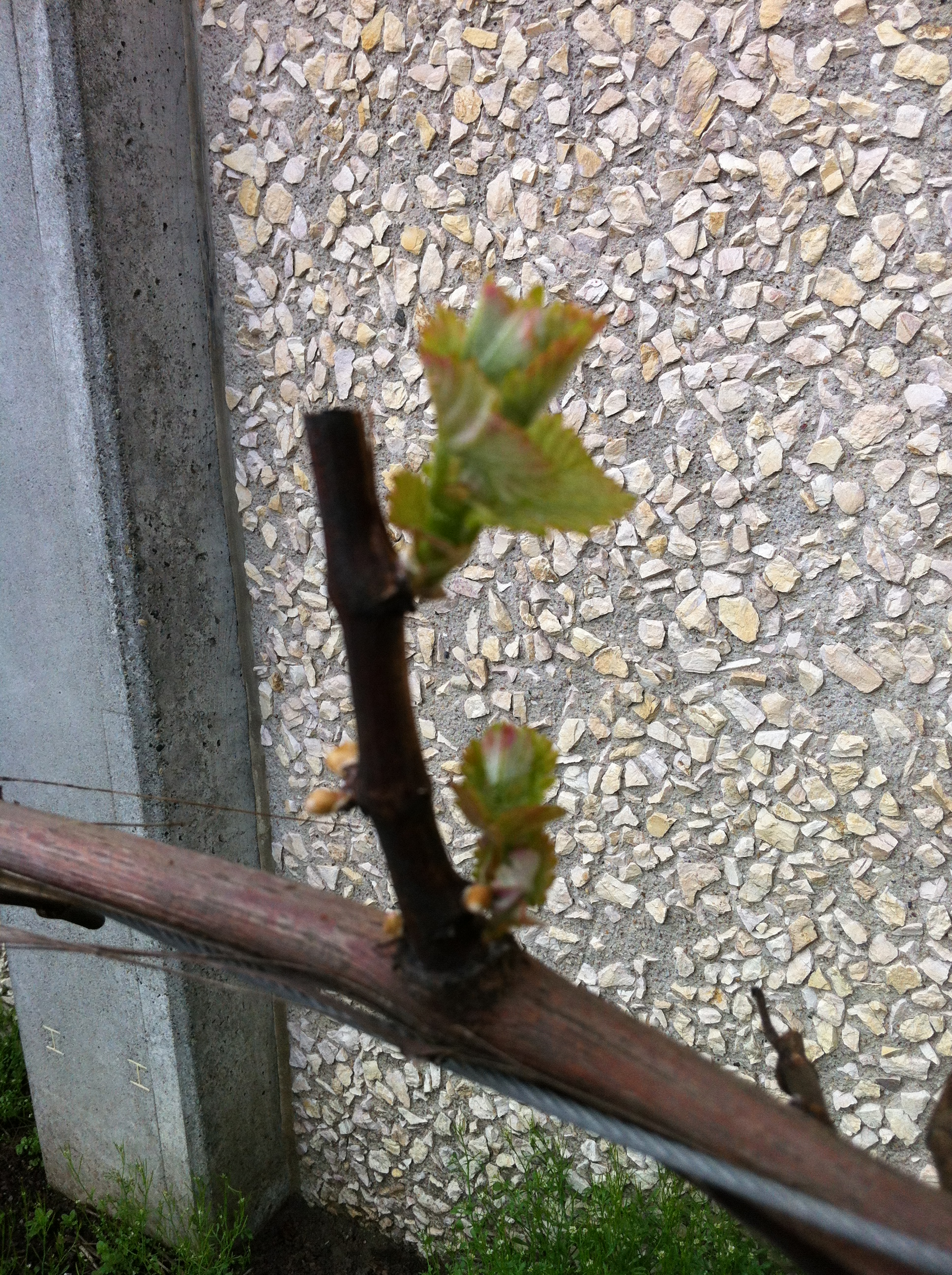
Gewürztraminer vine at budbreak

The history of the Traminer family is complicated, and not helped by its rather unstable genome. The story starts with the ancient Traminer variety, a green-skinned grape that takes its name from the village of Tramin, located in South Tyrol, the mainly German-speaking province in northern Italy. The famous ampelographer Pierre Galet thought that Traminer was identical to the green-skinned Savagnin blanc (not Sauvignon blanc) that makes vin jaune in the Jura. More recently it has been suggested that Savagnin blanc acquired slight differences in its leaf shape and geraniol content as it travelled to the other end of the Alps.

Frankisch in Austria, Gringet in Savoie, Heida in Switzerland, Formentin in Hungary and Grumin from Bohemia are all very similar to Savagnin blanc and probably represent clones of the Traminer family, if not Traminer itself. The Viognier of the Rhone Valley may be a more distant relative of Savagnin blanc.

At some point, either Traminer or Savagnin blanc mutated into a form with pink-skinned berries, called Red Traminer or Savagnin rose. Galet believed that a musqué ('muscat-like') mutation in the Red Traminer/Savagnin rose then led to the extra-aromatic Gewürztraminer, although in Germany these names are all regarded as synonymous.

With these convoluted genetics happening in the area that has been the front line for a millennium of wars in Europe, it is maybe not surprising that vines have been misnamed. Given that the wine made from 'Gewürztraminer' in Germany can be much less aromatic than that in Alsace, some of the German vines may well be misidentified Savagnin Rose. The Baden vineyard of Durbach claims its own type of Red Traminer called Durbacher Clevner (not to be confused with "Klevner", an Austrian synonym for Pinot blanc). The story goes that in 1780 Karl Friedrich, Grand Duke of Baden brought vines from Chiavenna in Italy, halfway between Tramin and the Jura, which was known to the Germans as Cleven.

The Klevener de Heiligenstein or Heiligensteiner Klevener found around Heiligenstein in Alsace may represent an outpost of the Durbach vines. They are often described as a less aromatic form of Gewürztraminer.

Traminer is recorded in Tramin from ca. 1000 until the 16th century. It was spread down the Rhine to Alsace, by way of the Palatinate, where Gewürz (spice) was added to its name – presumably this was when one of the mutations happened. The longer name was first used in Alsace (then under German rule) in the 1870's (. It is not clear what this name change represents, as it seems too great a coincidence that the musqué mutation happened just after the arrival of the great phylloxera epidemic. More likely, an existing mutant was selected for grafting onto phylloxera-resistant rootstocks when the vineyards were replanted. In 1973 the name Traminer was discontinued in Alsace except for in the Heiligenstein area.

== Crosses ==
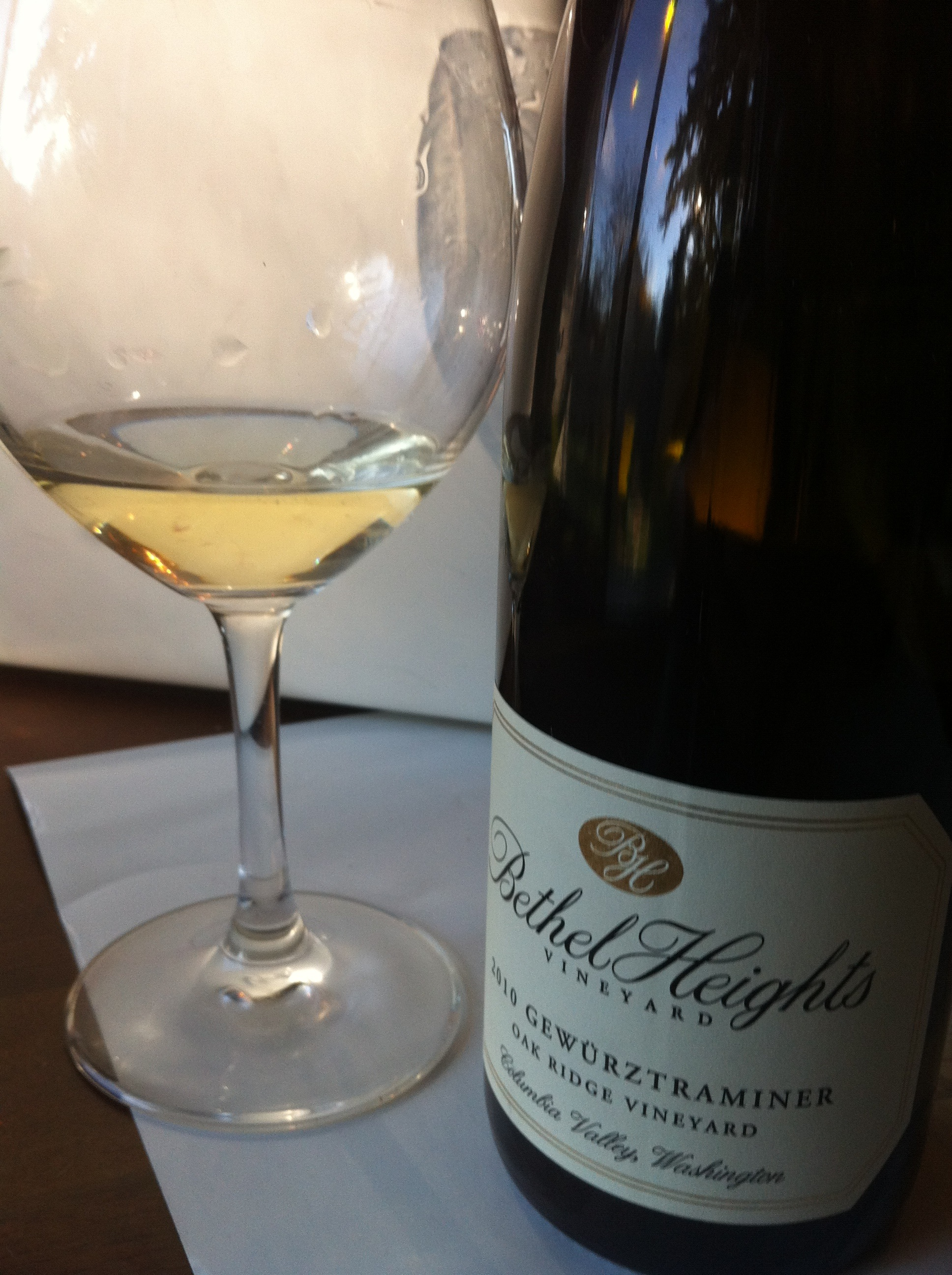
A Gewürztraminer made in Oregon from grapes grown in Washington State

The Germans have tried hard to breed the flavours of Gewürztraminer into vines that are easier to grow. In 1932, Georg Scheu crossed Gewürztraminer with Müller-Thurgau to produce Würzer, a little of which is grown in Rheinhessen and in England. Similar crosses at Alzey and Würzburg respectively have produced Septimer and the reasonably successful Perle. The early-ripening Siegerrebe is the result of a cross with Madeleine Angevine at Alzey and is notable for producing the highest ever must weight recorded in Germany, 326 °Oechsle. A cross between Müller-Thurgau and Siegerrebe produced Ortega.

Cserszegi fűszeres is the result of a Hungarian cross with Irsai Oliver.

In 1938, Harold Olmo crossed Sémillon and Gewürztraminer at U.C. Davis to make Flora, which is grown a little in California and New Zealand – in the latter it was mistaken for a late-ripening clone of Pinot gris. Brown Bros blend it with Orange Muscat in Australia.

In 1965, Gewürztraminer was crossed with Joannes Seyve 23.416 at the University of Illinois to produce a hybrid variety called Traminette. Traminette is more cold-tolerant than the original, while maintaining most of the desirable taste and aroma characteristics.

In the late 20th century, Australian viticulturalist and grape breeder A.J. Antcliff crossed Gewürztraminer with Merbein 29-56 to create the white grape variety Taminga.

During a series of trials between 1924 and 1930, Gewürztraminer was crossed with Trebbiano to create the pink-skinned Italian wine grape variety Manzoni rosa.

In 1970s, Czech winemaker and grape breeder Ing. Josef Veverka crossed in former Czechoslovakia Gewürztraminer with Müller-Thurgau to create the wine grape variety Pálava (the name refers to the Pálava hills located in the south Moravia). The grape variety is pink-skinned, earlier, more productive and of a finer traminer-like aroma. Pálava is grown in Moravia (Czech Republic) and Slovakia.

== Regions ==
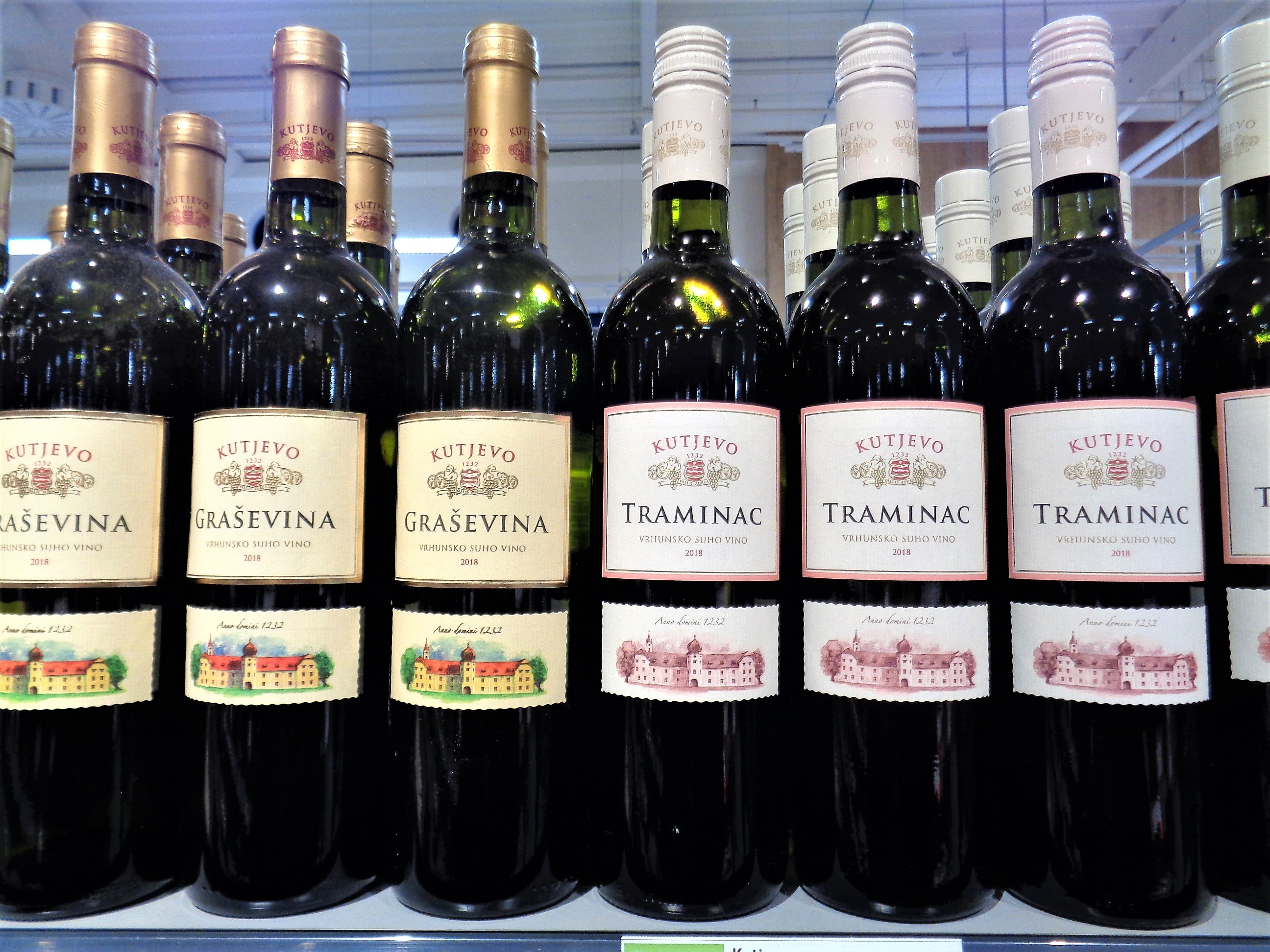
Bottles of Gewürztraminer (Traminac) made in Croatia

In Europe, the grape is grown in Austria, Bulgaria, Croatia, Czech Republic, England, France, Germany, Greece, Hungary, Italy, Luxembourg, North Macedonia, Romania, Serbia, Slovakia, Slovenia, Spain and Turkey. In the New World, the grape is grown in California and Northern Michigan, New Zealand, and in Mendoza, the most important wine region of Argentina and in the far south of Patagonia Argentina (Trevelin) and in Chile. In the Middle East, the grape is grown in the Golan Heights.

=== Australia ===
Gewürztraminers from the country's coolest regions can be fine examples. These include those from the Adelaide Hills, Eden Valley, the island of Tasmania, Clare Valley, Yarra Valley, the Great Southern region of Western Australia, the Canberra Region, and the vineyards scattered in the Australian Alps. The Macedon Ranges, just north of Melbourne, has a cold climate and volcanic soils, much suited to production of Gewürztraminer. (Macedon Ranges Vignerons Association.)

=== Canada ===
Canadian wine regions where it is grown include Vancouver Island and the Okanagan Valley of British Columbia, the Niagara Peninsula, and the north shore of Lake Erie and Prince Edward County wine regions of Ontario.

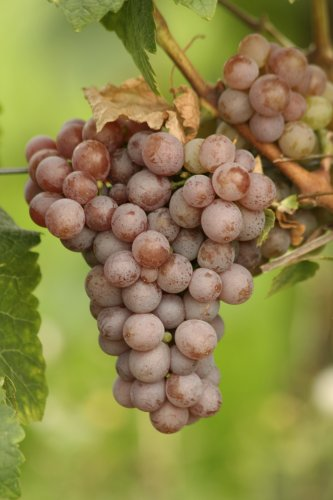
German Gewürztraminer – may be Red Traminer

=== France ===
Gewürztraminer is planted in Alsace, where it is the second most planted grape variety and the one most characteristic of the region. It grows better in the south of the region. Styles of Gewurztraminer d'Alsace range from the very dry Trimbach house style to the very sweet. The variety's high natural sugar means that it is popular for making dessert wine, both vendange tardive and the noble rot-affected Sélection de Grains Nobles.

As mentioned above, around Heiligenstein there is a grape known as Klevener de Heiligenstein, which is a Red Traminer (Savagnin Rose) and not a true Gewürz; the Heiligenstein wines are certainly more restrained than other Gewurztraminers d'Alsace.

=== Germany ===
Germany has about 10 square kilometres of the variety, but it is very different from that of their neighbours across the Rhine, in Alsace. As suggested above much of their "Gewürztraminer" is probably Red Traminer. The Germans go for a relatively dry style, that tries to subdue the natural flamboyance of the grape.

=== Italy ===
The Traminer is native to the cool Alpine slopes of the Trentino-Alto Adige/Südtirol in northeastern Italy. Whether the Gewürz- mutant originated there or not is an open question, but it is certainly grown there today. What is certain is that the name "Traminer" derives from the town of Tramin. Confusingly, both pink and green grapes may be called simply Traminer.

=== Luxembourg ===
Luxembourg has also been prominent in the production of wines with Gewürztraminer grapes.

=== New Zealand ===
Even though the volumes produced remain tiny, Gewürztraminer is more and more popular in New Zealand. Around 200 hectares are being grown today, including 70ha in Marlborough, 54ha in Hawke's Bay, 19ha in Gisborne, 18ha in North Canterbury and 10ha in Central Otago.

=== United States ===
In the United States, Gewürztraminer grapes are concentrated in Monterey, Mendocino and Sonoma in California, the Columbia Valley of Washington and Oregon, and the Snake River Region of Idaho. It is also grown in Michigan, Rhode Island, Caddo County, Oklahoma, Ohio, Pennsylvania, Kentucky, Indiana, Hawaii, Texas, Virginia, Maryland, Missouri, New Mexico, New Hampshire, Grand Valley, Colorado and the Finger Lakes and Long Island Regions of New York.

=== Argentina ===
Gewürztraminer in Argentina is a white aromatic variety, cultivated primarily in cold regions such as Patagonia, Mendoza, and Chapadmalal. It is characterized by intense aromas of lychees, white flowers, and spices, resulting in elegant and fresh wines that occasionally carry a late harvest or very expressive profile. Argentinian Gewürztraminers are generally aromatic and mouth-filling, with good acidity. They are ideal accompaniments for Asian cuisine (such as Thai or Indian), spicy dishes, white fresh cheeses, or dishes with bittersweet flavors.

== Vine and viticulture ==
Gewürztraminer is especially sensitive to both soil and climate. It is very susceptible to disease - particularly viral infections and rot in damp climates. Its natural sweetness means that in hot climates it does not have enough acidity to balance the huge amounts of sugar, and picking early to retain the acidity means that the varietal aromas do not develop. Fine silicious soils have been shown to increase both the spicy character and the aging ability of Gewürztraminer, while coarse dolomitic soils have been shown to make a floral and light Gewürztraminer. Shoot trimming and cluster thinning can increase terpene concentrations (both free volatile terpenes and potentially-volatile terpenes), but have not been shown to have a major impact on pH or titratable acidity. Droughts or lack of water reduce total Gewürztraminer yield via reductions in cluster and berry weight, as well as TA. The high sugar content of Gewürztraminer means water stress doesn't have an impact on °Brix.

== Synonyms ==
Genetic instability means that the Traminers should be regarded as a family of related clones, rather than distinct varieties. Thus DNA analysis will probably reveal that the following names are not synonymous. It gets even worse when it comes to Gewürztraminer, as Geilweilerhof, being Germans, see no difference between it and Red Traminer – and some of the names look like they belong to the original green-skinned Traminer/Savagnin blanc. Still, with those caveats, here they are:

Auvernas rouge, Blanc brun, Blanc Court, Bon blanc, Christkindeltraube, Christkindlestraube, Clevener, Clevner, Crevena Ruziva, Crovena Ruzica, Dišeči Traminec, Dreimaenner, Dreimannen, Dreipfennigholz, Drumin, Drumin Ljbora, Duret rouge, Edeltraube, Fermentin rouge, Fleischroth, Fleischweiner, Formentin rouge, Fourmenteau rouge, Frencher, Fromente, Fromenteau, Fűszeres, Fűszeres Tramini, Gentil Rose Aromatique, Gentil-duret rouge, Gentile blanc, Gertie, Gewuerztraminer, Gringet, Gris rouge, Haiden, Kirmizi Traminer, Klaebinger, Klaevner, Kleinbraun, Kleinwiener, Livora, Livora Cervena, Mala Dinka, Marzimmer, Mirisavi Traminac, Nature, Nature rose, Noble rose, Nuernberger Rot, Pinat Cervena, Piros Tramini, Plant Paien, Princ Cerveny, Princt Cervena, Princt Cerveny, Ranfoliza, Rosentraminer, Rotclevner, Rotedel, Roter Nuerberger, Roter Nuernberger, Roter Traminer, Rotfranken, Rothklauser, Rothweiner, Rothwiener, Rotklaevler, Rotklaevner, Rotklevner, Rousselet, Runziva, Rusa, Ruska, Ryvola, Salvagnin, Sauvagnin, Savagnin, Savagnin jaune, Savagnin Rosa Aromatique, Savagnin rose, Savagnin Rose Aromatique, Savagnin Rose Musque, St. Klauser, Termeno Aromatico, Tramín červený (Czech, Slovak), Tramin Korenny, Traminac, Traminac Crveni, Traminac Dišeći, Traminac mirisavi (Croatian), Traminac Mirisavi Crveni, Traminac Sivi, Traminec, Traminer, Traminer Aromatico, Traminer Epice, Traminer Musque, Traminer Parfume, Traminer rosa, Traminer Rose Aromatique, Traminer Rot, Traminer Rozovyi, Tramini Piros and Trammener.

== See also ==
- International variety
