= Bourgheim =

Bourgheim Burige
- Commune
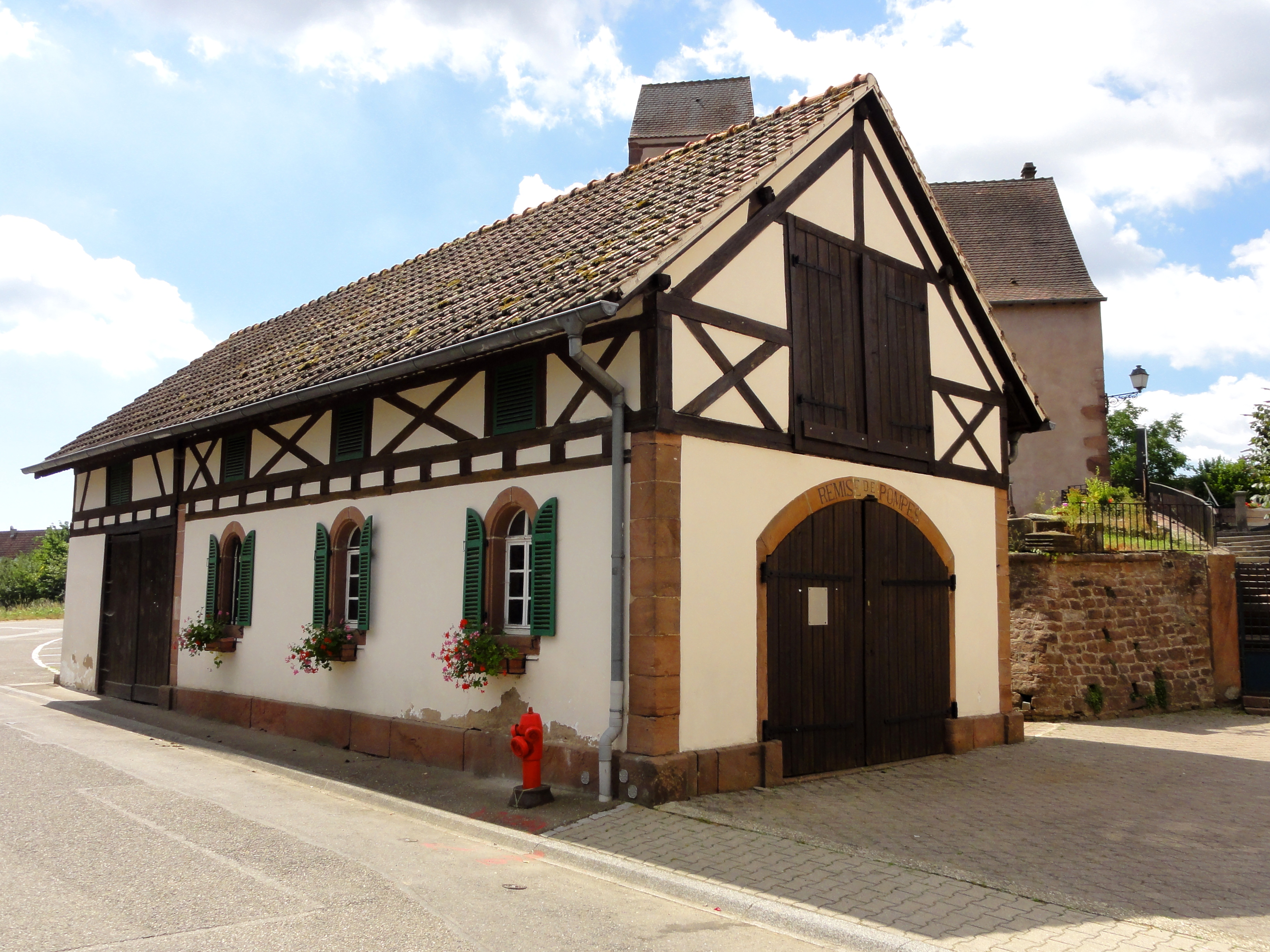
- The town hall in Bourgheim

- Coat of arms
- Location of Bourgheim
- Location within France Location within Grand Est
- Coordinates: 48°25′11″N 7°29′45″E
- Country: France
- Region: Grand Est
- Department: Bas-Rhin
- Arrondissement: Sélestat-Erstein
- Canton: Obernai

Government
  - Mayor (2020–2026): Jacques Cornec
- Area^{1}: 2.83 km^{2} (1.09 sq mi)
- Highest elevation: 221 m (725 ft)
- Lowest elevation: 159 m (522 ft)
- Population (2023): 650
  - Density: 230/km^{2} (590/sq mi)
- Time zone: UTC+01:00 (CET)
  - Summer (DST): UTC+02:00 (CEST)
- INSEE/Postal code: 67060 /67140
- ^{1} French Land Register data, which excludes lakes, ponds, glaciers > 1 km^{2} (0.386 sq mi or 247 acres) and river estuaries.

Bourgheim (French pronunciation: [buʁɡajm]; German: Burgheim) is a commune in the Bas-Rhin department in Alsace in north-eastern France.

== See also ==
- Communes of the Bas-Rhin department
