= Alsace Grand Cru AOC =

Wine from the Alsace region of France

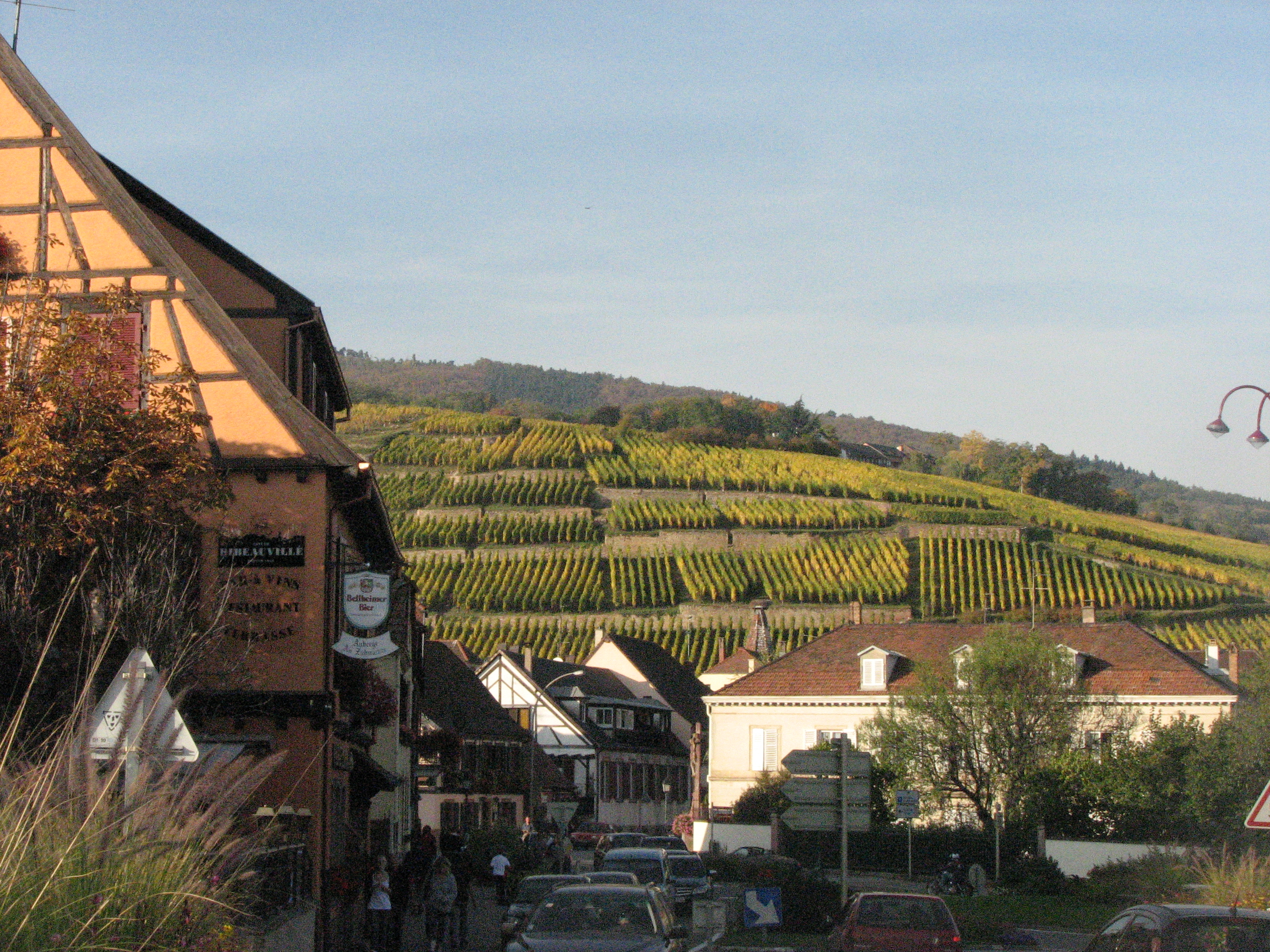
Geisberg, located just outside the village Ribeauvillé, is one of the 51 Grand Cru vineyards of Alsace.

Alsace Grand Cru (French pronunciation: [alzas ɡʁɑ̃ kʁy]) is an Appellation d'Origine Contrôlée for wines made in specific parcels of the Alsace wine region of France. The Grand Cru AOC was recognized in 1975 by the INAO with subsequent expansion in 1983, 1992 and 2007.

The wines come from selected sites in the Alsace AOC region, located at altitudes between 200 m and 300 m. To qualify for Grand Cru status, a wine must first meet the Alsace AOC rules and then other strict requirements. For example, the yield of the vineyards has to be 55 hectoliters per hectare or less, the wine has to come from a single named vineyard (called a lieu-dit in Alsace) of Grand Cru status, and the name of the vineyard must be on the label.

As of 2018, 51 lieux-dits are listed as Grand Cru, the latest addition being Kaefferkopf of Ammerschwihr in January 2007.

== History ==
=== Middle Age ===
In Alsace, the concept of cru vineyards came very early.

In 613, the king-to-be Dagobert gave vines on the Steinklotz to the abbey of Haslach.

In Rouffach in 762, Heddo, Archbishop of Strasbourg, founded the abbey of Ettenheim and made his income from the vines of the Vorbourg.

In Bennwihr in 777, the missi dominici passing through Alsace reported favorably to Charlemagne on the quality of Beno Villare ("Beno's domain") wines from the Marckrain.

In Sigolsheim, a charter of 783 notified that the Sigoltesberg vineyard (the current Mambourg) was the common property of the nearby lords and monasteries.

In Kintzheim in the 9th century, the Benedictine abbots of Ebersmunster owned vines on the Praelatenberg ("Prelates hill"). This lieu-dit has been farmed since 823.

In Dahlenheim and Scharrachbergheim, a charter declared a high quality vineyard of the Engelberg in 884.

In Wintzenheim in the 9th century, a gift from the abbey of Murbach cited the Hengst vineyard for the first time. The lords of Hohlandsbourg and the bailiff of Kayserberg shared its feudal rights until the French Revolution.

Between 1000 and the Renaissance, other Alsatian lieux-dits have been owned by the nobility or the clergy. The wealth of the Alsatian charter-binders formed the historical basis for the delimitation of the Alsace Grands Crus lieux-dits.

=== Contemporary ===
The Alsace wine region is distinct from other French wine regions.

After the 1919 Treaty of Versailles and the return of Alsace into France, German law in this previous Reichsland was largely retained as local law. This situation held up the recognition of Alsace wines.

A 1945 local ordinance designating the origin of Alsatian wines was used as the basis for the 1962 decree establishing the Alsace AOC. Neither the ordinance nor the decree contained a word about geographical designations or an allusion to crus.

The situation began to evolve with a decree in 1975 which created the designation "Alsace Grand Cru". Its first article makes clear that wines have first to meet the Alsace AOC rules. Then, a decree in 1983 designated an additional 25 lieux-dits.

In 1985, the INAO agreed to an increase in the Alsace Grands Crus list. The same year, a decree added 25 new names.

In 1984, the Vendange Tardive and Sélection de Grains Nobles designations were introduced. In 1993, Rouffach was admitted in the Vorbourg lieu-dit. In 2001, the maximal yield was reduced. In 2005, exceptions to vine planting were allowed. The most recent additions were in 2007, bringing the total to 51 grand cru vineyards.

== Geography ==
Alsace grands crus are produced in north-eastern France, in the region Alsace, on the territory of 47 communes (14 in Bas-Rhin and 33 in Haut-Rhin), from Marlenheim at northern end, westward from Strasbourg, to Thann at southern end, westward from Mulhouse.

=== Geology and orography ===
The Alsace plain occupies the south part of the Upper Rhine Plain, which formed from a collapse during the Oligocene and is followed since the Miocene by the river Rhine. The vineyard stays on the lower slopes of the Vosges Mountains, on the fault zone of the graben, covered by alluvial fans of the many rivers and creeks flowing from the nearby heights. This explains the variety of the subsurface materials and their succession forming a true mosaic: limestone, granite, shale, gneiss or sandstone.

Mainly, the upper part of the slopes of the sub-Vosge hills consists of old rocks: pluton and metamorphic rocks like granite, gneiss or slate. Vine-planted parcels are rather steep and climb up to 478 m height (near Osenbach). The lower part of the slopes consists of layers of limestone or marl covered by loess where the slope is rather smooth.

The plain consists of a thick layer of alluvium deposited by the Rhine (silt and gravel). This zone is more fertile than the others, with an important aquifer close to the surface (less than 5 m deep): the Upper Rhine aquifer.

Such differences allow each Grand Cru to benefit from a particular terroir, even more differentiated by the climate.

=== Climatology ===
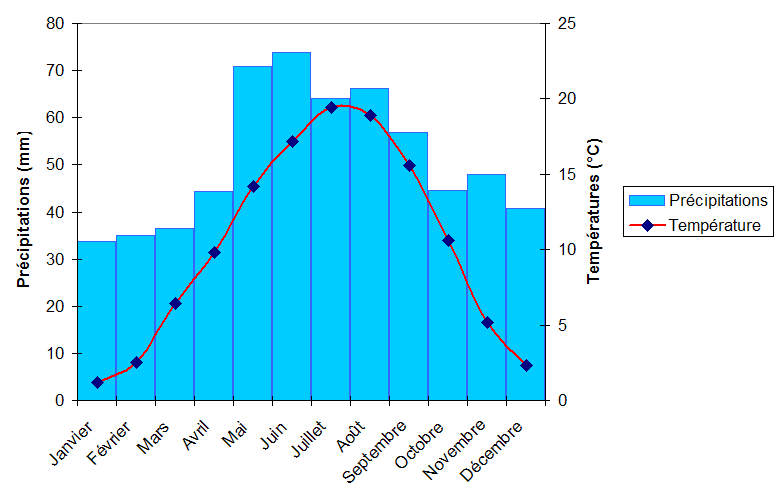
Means of temperature and precipitation near Strasbourg (1949-2001)

On the western side, the Vosges Mountains shield the Alsatian vineyards from wind and rain. Predominately western winds lose their moisture on the eastern side of the Vosges and arrive as Foehn winds into the Alsace plain. The precipitation mean in Alsace is the least of all French wine regions. Colmar is one of the driest cities in France.

Consequently, the climate is more temperate than expected at this latitude: the annual mean temperature is about 1.5 °C higher. The climate is semi-continental and dry with hot springs, sunny and dry summers, long autumns and cold winters.

Each of the Grands Crus benefits from a microclimate, inevitably different from place to place.

== Allowed varieties ==
As of 2011, Alsace Grand Cru wines can only be produced using one of four white grape varieties: Riesling, Muscat, Pinot gris and Gewürztraminer. In 2006, Zotzenberg became the only Grand Cru vineyard that could produce wine from Sylvaner. Except for certain vineyards where blends are allowed, the wines must be exclusively made using a single variety and may be labelled as such. Late harvest wines must be labelled by grape variety. For Muscat-labelled wines, only one of the allowed Muscat varieties can be used (see table below).

=== Vineyards where blends are allowed ===
In some Grand Cru vineyards, blends are allowed, which may also include some non-noble grapes. In Alsace, blends have usually been associated with wines of lesser quality. The producer primarily associated with high-quality blends is Marcel Deiss.

Grand Cru vineyard	Option 1: Only one of these varieties.	Option 2: These varieties in certain proportions. Varietal labelling not allowed.
Altenberg de Bergheim	Gewürztraminer, Pinot gris, Riesling	50-70% Riesling, 10-25% Pinot gris, 10-25% Gewürztraminer; Up to 10% total of Pinot blanc, Pinot noir, Muscat Ottonel, Muscat blanc à petits grains, Muscat rose à petits grain, Chasselas if these varieties were planted before 26 March 2005.
Kaefferkopf	Gewürztraminer, Pinot gris, Riesling	60-80% Gewürztraminer, 10-40% Riesling, 0-30% Pinot gris; Up to 10% total of Muscat Ottonel, Muscat blanc à petits grains, Muscat rose à petits grains.

== List of Alsace Grands Crus ==
Grand Cru vineyards (lieux-dits) with their commune(s)/village(s), département, size and the date it was granted Grand Cru status. Where the same name is used for several vineyards, its official name is "vineyard" de "village", such as Altenberg de Bergbieten, Altenberg de Bergheim or Altenberg de Wolxheim.

Map of the Alsace wine region and its wine villages. Grand Cru vineyards are indicated in red.

Vineyard	Village	Département	Size (Hectares)	Date granted Grand Cru status
Altenberg de Bergbieten	Bergbieten	Bas-Rhin	29.07	23 November 1983
Altenberg de Bergheim	Bergheim	Haut-Rhin	35.06	23 November 1983
Altenberg de Wolxheim	Wolxheim	Bas-Rhin	31.20	17 December 1992
Brand	Turckheim	Haut-Rhin	57.95	23 November 1983
Bruderthal	Molsheim	Bas-Rhin	18.40	17 December 1992
Eichberg	Eguisheim	Haut-Rhin	57.62	23 November 1983
Engelberg	Dahlenheim, Scharrachbergheim	Bas-Rhin	14.80	17 December 1992
Florimont	Ingersheim, Katzenthal	Haut-Rhin	21	17 December 1992
Frankstein	Dambach-la-Ville	Bas-Rhin	56.20	17 December 1992
Froehn	Zellenberg	Haut-Rhin	14.60	17 December 1992
Furstentum	Kientzheim, Sigolsheim	Haut-Rhin	30.50	17 December 1992
Geisberg	Ribeauville	Haut-Rhin	8.53	23 November 1983
Gloeckelberg	Rodern, Saint-Hippolyte	Haut-Rhin	23.40	23 November 1983
Goldert	Gueberschwihr	Haut-Rhin	45.35	23 November 1983
Hatschbourg	Hattstatt, Voegtlinshoffen	Haut-Rhin	47.36	23 November 1983
Hengst	Wintzenheim	Haut-Rhin	53.02	23 November 1983
Kaefferkopf	Ammerschwihr	Haut-Rhin	71.65	12 January 2007
Kanzlerberg	Bergheim	Haut-Rhin	3.23	23 November 1983
Kastelberg	Andlau	Bas-Rhin	5.82	23 November 1983
Kessler	Guebwiller	Haut-Rhin	28.53	23 November 1983
Kirchberg de Barr	Barr	Bas-Rhin	40.63	23 November 1983
Kirchberg de Ribeauvillé	Ribeauville	Haut-Rhin	11.40	23 November 1983
Kitterlé	Guebwiller	Haut-Rhin	25.79	23 November 1983
Mambourg	Sigolsheim	Haut-Rhin	61.85	17 December 1992
Mandelberg	Mittelwihr, Beblenheim	Haut-Rhin	22	17 December 1992
Marckrain	Bennwihr, Sigolsheim	Haut-Rhin	53.35	17 December 1992
Moenchberg	Andlau, Eichhoffen	Bas-Rhin	11.83	23 November 1983
Muenchberg	Nothalten	Bas-Rhin	17.70	17 December 1992
Ollwiller	Wuenheim	Haut-Rhin	35.86	23 November 1983
Osterberg	Ribeauvillé	Haut-Rhin	24.60	17 December 1992
Pfersigberg	Eguisheim, Wettolsheim	Haut-Rhin	74.55	17 December 1992
Pfingstberg	Orschwihr	Haut-Rhin	28.15	17 December 1992
Praelatenberg	Kintzheim	Bas-Rhin	18.70	17 December 1992
Rangen	Thann, Vieux-Thann	Haut-Rhin	22.13	23 November 1983
Rosacker	Hunawihr	Haut-Rhin	26.18	23 November 1983
Saering	Guebwiller	Haut-Rhin	26.75	23 November 1983
Schlossberg	Kientzheim	Haut-Rhin	80.28	20 November 1975
Schoenenbourg	Riquewihr, Zellenberg	Haut-Rhin	53.40	17 December 1992
Sommerberg	Niedermorschwihr, Katzenthal	Haut-Rhin	28.36	23 November 1983
Sonnenglanz	Beblenheim	Haut-Rhin	32.80	23 November 1983
Spiegel	Bergholtz, Guebwiller	Haut-Rhin	18.26	23 November 1983
Sporen	Riquewihr	Haut-Rhin	23.70	17 December 1992
Steinert	Pfaffenheim, Westhalten	Haut-Rhin	38.90	17 December 1992
Steingrubler	Wettolsheim	Haut-Rhin	22.95	17 December 1992
Steinklotz	Marlenheim	Bas-Rhin	40.60	17 December 1992
Vorbourg	Rouffach, Westhalten	Haut-Rhin	73.61	17 December 1992
Wiebelsberg	Andlau	Bas-Rhin	12.52	23 November 1983
Wineck-Schlossberg	Katzenthal, Ammerschwihr	Haut-Rhin	27.40	17 December 1992
Winzenberg	Blienschwiller	Bas-Rhin	19.20	17 December 1992
Zinnkoepflé	Soultzmatt, Westhalten	Haut-Rhin	71.03	17 December 1992
Zotzenberg	Mittelbergheim	Bas-Rhin	36.45	17 December 1992

== See also ==
- Alsace wine regions
- Alsace wine
