= Brand (grand cru) =

Alsace Grand Cru Brand is a French white wine produced in the Haut-Rhin department, in Alsace.

On the Alsace Wine Route, Brand is located between the crus of Gloeckelberg to the north and Kanzlerberg just to the west. It is one of the fifty-one grands crus of the Alsace region, each enjoying its own appellation but sharing the same Alsace Grand Cru specifications (with more stringent constraints than for the Alsace appellation in general).

The first mention of the vineyard was in the 13th Century, in a manuscript conserved in the city library of Colmar.

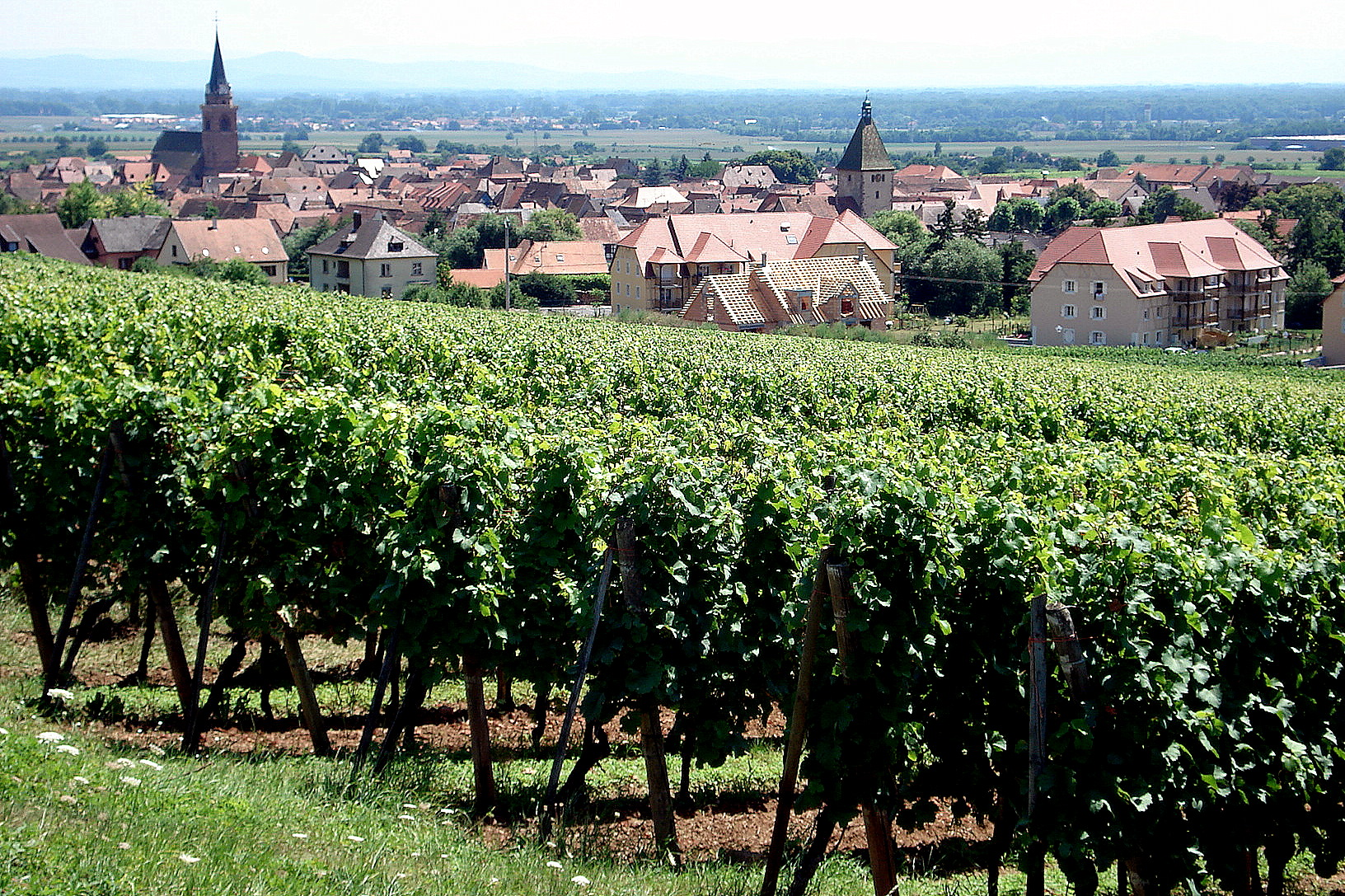
The village of Altenberg seen over vines.

== History ==
In 1983, Brand was one of the twenty-four lieux-dits selected to become the geographical names of the Alsace Grand Cru appellation.

There have been some changes since then: the decree of 1 March 1984 regulates the terms vendanges tardives and sélection de grains nobles within the appellation and the decree of 24 January 2001 reduces yields and offers the option of modifying the specifications of each denomination (each vintage) after consulting the local wine syndicate.

In October 2011, all the grands crus of Alsace went from the status of geographical denominations within the same appellation to that of separate appellations sharing the same specifications.

== Etymology ==
The likely etymology of the word Brand is from the German Brand, "burn" - possibly referring to the use of fire to clear forest for the planting of vineyards.

== Geology ==

The area has a granite base, as well as sand and a low (acidic) pH. The centre of the appelation is marked by granite and sand, while the area as a whole there is a granite base along with mica.

== Climatology ==
To the west, the Vosges protect the hillside from wind and rain. The prevailing westerly winds lose their moisture on the western slopes of the Vosges and reach Alsace in the form of foehn winds, dry and warm. Precipitation is therefore particularly low.

As a result, the climate is much drier (Colmar is the driest station in France) and a little warmer (with an average annual temperature 1.5 °C higher) than would be expected at this latitude. The climate is continental and dry with warm springs, dry and sunny summers, long autumns and cold winters.

The vineyard plots are on hillsides, between 250 and 380 metres above sea level, south to south-east facing onto the town of Turckheim from the north. The appellation area is surrounded from the west to the north-east by hills (the Eichberg, Kirchberg and Alterberg) forming a semicircle that protects the vines from the north winds. The planted area is 57.95 hectares.

== Climate ==
The appellation shares features with Alsace in general, namely the protection from wind and rain provided by the Vosges mountains. The winds lose their humidity as they pass eastward over the hills, with dry and warm Foehn wind passing over the vignoble, leading to very low rainfall.

The nearest meteorological station to Kintzheim is the Entzheim station. Values between 1961 and 1990 are as follows:

Climate data for Strasbourg-Entzheim
Month	Jan	Feb	Mar	Apr	May	Jun	Jul	Aug	Sep	Oct	Nov	Dec	Year
Mean daily maximum °C	3.5	5.8	10.4	14.6	19	22.2	24.7	24.2	20.8	14.7	8.2	4.5	14.4
Daily mean °C	0.9	2.5	6	9.6	13.8	17	19.1	18.6	15.5	10.6	5.2	1.9	19.1
Mean daily minimum °C	−1.7	−0.9	1.6	4.6	8.6	11.7	13.4	13.1	10.3	6.5	2.1	−0.7	5.7
Average precipitation mm	33.1	34.3	36.6	48	74.5	74.6	56.8	67.8	55.5	43	46.6	39.9	610.5
Mean daily maximum °F	38.3	42.4	50.7	58.3	66	72.0	76.5	75.6	69.4	58.5	46.8	40.1	57.9
Daily mean °F	33.6	36.5	43	49.3	56.8	63	66.4	65.5	59.9	51.1	41.4	35.4	66.4
Mean daily minimum °F	28.9	30.4	34.9	40.3	47.5	53.1	56.1	55.6	50.5	43.7	35.8	30.7	42.3
Average precipitation inches	1.30	1.35	1.44	1.9	2.93	2.94	2.24	2.67	2.19	1.7	1.83	1.57	24.04
Mean monthly sunshine hours	42	78	122	161	197	212	240	215	168	101	58	43	1,637

== Grape varieties ==
Wines corresponding to the Appellation d'Origine Contrôlée Alsace Grand Cru followed by the geographical name (place name) Altenberg de Bergheim must be produced with the following grape varieties, either as a single variety or as a blend: Riesling, Pinot Gris, Gewurztraminer or one of the Muscats (Muscat Ottonel, Muscat Blanc à Petits Grains, or Muscat Rose à Petits Grains).

Gewurztraminer (meaning "aromatic traminer" in German) is the most cultivated grape variety on the Altenberg. It is a pink grape variety with orange or purple berries. This close relative of Savagnin and Savagnin Rose (called Klevener de Heiligenstein in Alsace) is rather vigorous, produces large yields and gives better results on marl or limestone soils than on granite or schist soils.

Riesling is not widely grown in Altenberg def Bergheim, but it is dominant in the blends (the grape variety limits mean between 50 and 70% of the surface area of the plots dedicated to the blends). It is a grape variety with late budburst and late ripening, requiring hillsides well exposed to the sun, whose harvests can take place around mid-October. On the other hand, it resists winter frosts well.

Pinot Gris (called Grauburgunder, "Gray Burgundian" in German, "Malvoisie" in Valais or Pinot Grigio in Italy) is a fragile grape variety and ripens quite early. It comes from a mutation of Pinot Noir and is therefore of Burgundian origin, where it is called "Pinot Beurot". It gives better results on soils composed of limestone gravel provided they are well drained thanks to a hillside exposure.

Muscats are rarely grown, either in the entire Alsace vineyard or in plots classified as Grands Crus. Muscat Blanc à Petits Grains, also called "Muscat d'Alsace", is originally from Greece; it has been grown in Alsace since at least the beginning of the 16th century. It is rather early. Muscat Ottonel is more recent, discovered in the 19th century in the Loire Valley before arriving in Alsace in the middle of the century. Ottonel is a hybrid of Chasselas, so it ripens even earlier than Muscat d'Alsace.

== Cultivation practices ==
The vines are trained high to protect them from frost, with the foliage espaliered; the height of the trellised foliage cannot be less than 0.675 times the spacing between the rows. The pruning of the vine must be done in single or double guyot with a maximum of ten buds per square meter of ground surface for the Gewurztraminer grape variety and eight buds per square meter of ground surface for the other grape varieties.

The average maximum load per plot is set at 10,000 kilograms of grapes per hectare.

== Yields ==
The yield limit for the entire Alsace Grand Cru appellation is set at 55 hectoliters per hectare, with a maximum yield of 66 hectoliters per hectare which is much lower than the 80 hectoliters authorized by the Alsace appellation. Bergheim winegrowers have set a stricter maximum yield since 1995, through a quality charter common to wo Bergheim crus (Altenberg and Kanzlerberg): 50 hectoliters per hectare. The actual yield of the entire appellation (the 51 Alsatian crus) was 50 hectoliters per hectare on average for the year 2009. Although this is well below the average yields of the Alsace vineyard, it is a yield within the French average.

The grands crus of Alsace must be harvested by hand.

== Wines ==
=== Alcoholic strengths ===
The grapes harvested must have a minimum average natural alcoholic strength by volume of 12.5% for the Pinot Gris and Gewurztraminer grape varieties and 11% for Riesling and the Muscats. Wines from a blend have a minimum average natural alcoholic strength by volume of 12%.

Any single batch of grape harvests with a sugar content of less than 193 grams per litre of must for the Pinot Gris and Gewurztraminer grape varieties and 168 grams per litre of must for the other grape varieties are not considered to be at good maturity. When authorisation for chaptalisation (enrichment with sugar for fermentation) is granted, the increase in the minimum average natural alcoholic strength by volume cannot exceed 1.5% vol. On the advice of the union of producers of the vintage, the regional committee of experts of Alsace wines can propose annually to the national committee of wines and spirits of the National Institute of Appellations of Origin, for the name and for each grape variety, a minimum average natural alcoholic strength higher and a sugar content of the unit batches higher than those mentioned above, as well as a maximum chaptalization lower than the rate mentioned above.

== Vendanges tardives and selections des grains nobles ==
Vendanges tardives wines (Late harvest wines) refer to wines made from grapes whose harvest has been delayed to allow them to overripen, resulting in wines rich in sugar and alcohol, with more powerful and often mellow tastes. According to the law, the must must have at least 243 grams of sugar per litre if it is Gewurztraminer or Pinot Gris (or 14.4% of potential alcohol), or at least 220 grams of sugar per liter if it is Riesling or Muscat (or 13.1% of potential alcohol); no chaptalization is allowed. As for selection des grains nobles, this is a wine made from grapes harvested by successive selective sorting of the grains affected by noble rot (the fungus Botrytis cinerea), which gives even more concentrated, sweeter wines.

== Vinification and aging ==
The grands crus of Alsace must be harvested manually. On the day of the harvest, upon arrival at the winery, the grapes are crushed and pressed to separate the must from the grape pomace. For this work, pneumatic presses are gradually replacing horizontal presses with plates. Then the pomace is put into a vat for settling, which is the drawing off of the juice without the lees, either by filtering or by decanting while waiting for them to settle at the bottom of the vat.

Alcoholic fermentation begins under the action of indigenous yeasts or selected yeasts introduced during the yeasting: this operation transforms the sugar in the grapes into alcohol. Controlling the fermentation temperature using a refrigeration system allows the aromatic potential of the product to be expressed. Once fermentation is complete after a month, the wine is drawn off to remove the lees. Malolactic fermentation is generally not carried out, blocked by sulfiding to preserve the acidity of the wine. The latter can be stored in vats to prepare it for bottling or aged in oak barrels or tuns.

== Bottling ==
Alsace wines must be bottled only in flutes, i.e. bottles of the "Rhine wine" type of 75 centiliters, regulated by several decrees.

== Labelling ==
Throughout the Alsace vineyards, wines are most often identified by their grape variety(ies): Riesling, Gewurztraminer, etc. This mention dominates the label even if it is optional.

When the Alsace Grand Cru appellation was created, the aim was clearly to promote the terroir. The mention of the grape variety is not obligatory and it is possible to put the name of the denomination in larger characters than that of the grape variety. In addition, part of the production of Altenberg de Bergheim is done by blending. So several mentions on the bottle label are possible, either simply the name of the appellation and the geographical name (Alsace Grand Cru Brand), or with in addition a mention of grape variety (Riesling, Pinot Gris, Gewurztraminer or Muscat), to which can be added the terms selection des grains nobles or vendanges tardives, as well as the name of a place name within the name.
