= Praelatenberg =

The Alsace Grand Cru wine growing area of Praelatenberg is a white wine area in the lieu-dit of Praelatenberg, situated in the commune of Kintzheim, in the département of Bas-Rhin, in Alsace.

It is one of the fifty-one Grands Crus of the Alsace wine region, benefiting from the status of the Grand Cru system but subject to the stricter regulations the designation requires.

== History ==
In the ninth century, the Benedictine abbey, Ebersmunster Abbey owned the vines of Praelatenberg (Mont des Prélats). The lieu-dit has been known as early as 823.

The Alsace Grand Cru appellation was first recognised in the decree of 23 November 1983, but the Praelatenberg cru was not amongst the first twenty-five wines selected. Its winegrowers had to wait until the decree of 17 December 1992 before they were added. Since then there have been several modifications. The decree of 1 March 1984 regulated the use of the terms vendanges tardives and sélection de grains nobles. The decree of 24 January 2001 reduced the permitted yields while adding the possibility of modifying each cru's specifications, on the advice of the local wine producers.

In October 2011, all the grands crus of Alsace moved from being separate areas within one Grand Cru to each representing a separate Grand Cru.

== Etymology ==
Praelatenberg means "hill of the prelates" in German, referring as mentioned above to the Ebersmunster Abbey which farmed the area from the ninth century.

== Location ==
The location is within the département of Bas-Rhin, in the commune of Kintzheim. It lies 6 kilometres west of Sélestat, near the Château du Haut-Koenigsbourg.

== Climate ==
The appellation is subject to the climatic features of the Alsace region in general, in particular the protection from wind and rain provided by the Vosges mountains. The winds lose their humidity as they pass eastward over the hills, with dry and warm Foehn wind passing over the vignoble, leading to very low rainfall.

The nearest meteorological station to Kintzheim is the Strasbourg Entzheim station. Values between 1961 and 1990 are as follows:

Climate data for Strasbourg-Entzheim
Month	Jan	Feb	Mar	Apr	May	Jun	Jul	Aug	Sep	Oct	Nov	Dec	Year
Mean daily maximum °C	3.5	5.8	10.4	14.6	19	22.2	24.7	24.2	20.8	14.7	8.2	4.5	14.4
Daily mean °C	0.9	2.5	6	9.6	13.8	17	19.1	18.6	15.5	10.6	5.2	1.9	19.1
Mean daily minimum °C	−1.7	−0.9	1.6	4.6	8.6	11.7	13.4	13.1	10.3	6.5	2.1	−0.7	5.7
Average precipitation mm	33.1	34.3	36.6	48	74.5	74.6	56.8	67.8	55.5	43	46.6	39.9	610.5
Mean daily maximum °F	38.3	42.4	50.7	58.3	66	72.0	76.5	75.6	69.4	58.5	46.8	40.1	57.9
Daily mean °F	33.6	36.5	43	49.3	56.8	63	66.4	65.5	59.9	51.1	41.4	35.4	66.4
Mean daily minimum °F	28.9	30.4	34.9	40.3	47.5	53.1	56.1	55.6	50.5	43.7	35.8	30.7	42.3
Average precipitation inches	1.30	1.35	1.44	1.9	2.93	2.94	2.24	2.67	2.19	1.7	1.83	1.57	24.04
Mean monthly sunshine hours	42	78	122	161	197	212	240	215	168	101	58	43	1,637

== Vineyards ==
The vineyards are on the flanks of two hills separated by a stream, between 250 and 350 meters above sea level. Its steep slopes face southeast, between Kintzheim and Orschwiller. The planted area is 18.7 hectares in size.

== Grapes ==
Wines from the Praelatenberg Grand Cru must be made from the following grapes: Riesling, Pinot Gris, Gewürztraminer or one of the Muscats: Muscat Ottonel, Muscat Blanc à Petits Grains, or Muscat Rose à Petits Grains.

== Geology ==
The "heavy but well-drained" quartz-containing gneiss soil is thought to provide the wines with a strong minerality, and the microclimate with its east-south-east orientation seems relatively insensitive to the vagaries of vintage changes. Sommelier Romain Iltis has noted the equilibrium of the Riesling, and the aroma spices typical of the Gewurztraminer.

== Labelling ==
A wide range of descriptors may be used on labels corresponding to the several varieties of grape and the potential for late harvesting:

- Alsace grand cru Praelatenberg;
- Alsace grand cru Praelatenberg Riesling;
- Alsace grand cru Praelatenberg Gewürztraminer;
- Alsace grand cru Praelatenberg pinot gris;
- Alsace grand cru Praelatenberg muscat;
- Alsace grand cru Praelatenberg vendanges tardives Riesling;
- Alsace grand cru Praelatenberg vendanges tardives Gewürztraminer;
- Alsace grand cru Praelatenberg vendanges tardives pinot gris;
- Alsace grand cru Praelatenberg vendanges tardives muscat;
- Alsace grand cru Praelatenberg sélection de grains nobles Riesling;
- Alsace grand cru Praelatenberg sélection de grains nobles Gewürztraminer;
- Alsace grand cru Praelatenberg sélection de grains nobles pinot gris;
- Alsace grand cru Praelatenberg sélection de grains nobles muscat.
