= Hengst (grand cru) =

The Alsace Grand Cru Hengst, or Hengst, is a French wine originating in the commune of Wintzenheim, in the département of Haut-Rhin, in Alsace. While historically almost solely made up by white wines, a small amount of production is now Grand Cru red wine, solely from Pinot Noir grapes.

It is one of the fifty-one Alsace wine areas (vignobles) which have Alsace Grand Cru AOC status.

== History ==
Hengst was mentioned for the first time in Wintzenheim in the 19th century. The seigneurs of Haut Landsbourg and the bailiff of Kayserberg had proprietary rights there until the French Revolution.

In 1983 Hengst was one of the twenty-four places used as geographical names in the Alsace Grand Cru appellation.

Since then several changes have occurred: the decree of 1 March 1984 regulates the use of the terms vendanges tardives and sélection de grains nobles within the appellation, and the decree of 24 January 2001 both reduces allowed yields and allows the modification of the specifications of each denomination (each vintage) after consulting the local wine syndicate.

In October 2011, all the grands crus of Alsace moved from being geographical names within the same appellation to that of individual appellations sharing the same specifications.

== Etymology ==
In German, the word Hengst means "stallion".

== Geography ==
Hengst is produced in France, in the Alsace region, more precisely in the département of Haut-Rhin, in the Wintzenheim commune, 6 kilometers west of Colmar.

On the Alsace Wine Route, Hengst is situated between Brand in the north and Steingrubler in the south.

== Geology ==
The vines are located on marno-calcaire soil originating in the Oligocene. This sort of setting provides both power (thought to originate in the clay) and finesse (thought to originate in the limestone).

== Climate ==
In the west, the Vosges protect the hillside from wind and rain. The prevailing westerly winds lose their moisture on the western slope of the Vosges and reach Alsace in the form of Foehn winds winds, dry and warm. Precipitation is therefore particularly low.

As a result, the climate is much drier (Colmar is the driest resort in France) and slightly warmer (with an average annual temperature 1.5 °C higher ) than would be expected at this latitude. The climate is continental and dry with warm springs, dry and sunny summers, long autumns and cold winters.

== Vineyards ==
The vineyard plots are on the hillside, between 270 and 360 metres above sea level, on gentle slopes to the south-east, between Wettolsheim (to the south-east) and Wintzenheim (to the north). The planted area is 53.02 hectares in size.

Wines with the designation Hengst Grand Cru must be produced with the following grape varieties: White grapes are Riesling, Pinot Gris, Gewurztraminer or one of the muscats (Muscat Ottonel, Muscat Blanc à Petits Grains or Muscat Rose à Petits Grains). In addition, Hengst is one of only three Alsace Grand Crus (the others being Kirchberg de Barr and Vorbourg) which is permitted to release the red grape Pinot Noir as a Grand Cru. However a longstanding practice has been for winemakers to label their wines with a hint as to their unofficial link to a Grand Cru. For example, Domaine Muré have until 2024 labelled a wine "Pinot Noir V" to indicate that the wine originates in Pinot Noir grapes grown within what is otherwise the Grand Cru Vorbourg. Interestingly there is a 60-year-old planting of Auxerrois in the midst of the Hengst vineyard, owned by Josmeyer. It cannot be named Hengst as Auxerrois is not a "noble" variety, but Josmeyer label it "H" as a hint to its geographical origin. It is bottled as Pinot Auxerrois Vielles Vignes.

Gewurztraminer (meaning "aromatic traminer" in German) is the most cultivated grape varieties in Hengst. It is a pink grape variety with orange or purple berries. This close relative of Savagnin and Savagnin rose (called Klevener de Heiligenstein in Alsace) is rather vigorous, produces large yields and gives better results on marl or limestone soils than on granite or schist soils.

Pinot gris- called Grauburgunder, "Burgundian grey" in German, "Malvoisie" in Valais or Pinot Grigio in Italy) is a fragile grape variety that ripens quite early. It is the result of a mutation of Pinot Noir and is therefore of Burgundian origin, where it is called "Pinot Beurot". It gives better results on soils composed of limestone gravel provided they are well drained thanks to hillside exposure.

Riesling is not widely grown in Hengst. It is a grape variety with late budburst and ripening, requiring hillsides well exposed to the sun, and the harvest can take place around mid-October. It is resistant to winter frosts.

Muscat is rarely grown, be that in plots classified as grands crus or in the Alsace region in general. Muscat blanc à petits grains, also called "Muscat d'Alsace", is originally from Greece; it has been grown in Alsace since at least the beginning of the 16th century. Muscat Ottonel is more recent, discovered in the 19th century in the Loire Valley before arriving in Alsace in the middle of the century. Ottonel is a hybrid of Chasselas.

Pinot noir though grown for many years was finally elevated to Grand Cru status in Hengst in 2022. It is subject to strict regulation, including regarding yields, which are only 40 litres/hectare for Pinot Noir as opposed to 50 litres/hectare for the whites from the same Grand Cru.

=== Cultivation ===
The vines are trained high to protect them from frost, with the foliage trained in espaliers; the height of the trained foliage cannot be less than 0.675 times the spacing between the rows. The vines must be pruned in single or double Guyot with a maximum of ten buds per square meter of ground surface for the Gewurztraminer grape variety and eight buds per square meter of ground surface for the other grape varieties.

The average maximum load per plot is set at 10,000 kilograms of grapes per hectare.

=== Yields ===
The yield limit for the entire Alsace Grand Cru appellation is set at 55 hectolitres per hectare, with a maximum yield of 66 hectolitres per hectare, which is much lower than the 80 hectolitres authorised by the Alsace appellation.

The actual yield of the entire appellation (the 51 Alsatian named areas) is 50 hectolitres per hectare on average for the year 2009. Although this is well below the average yields of the Alsace vineyard, it is a yield within the French average.

The Alsace grand cru wines must be harvested by hand.

== Wines ==
=== Alcohol levels ===
The harvested grapes must have a minimum average natural alcoholic strength by volume of 12.5% for Pinot Gris and Gewurztraminer, and 11% for Riesling and Muscat. Wines from a blend must have a minimum average natural alcoholic strength by volume of 12%.

Minimum sugar content at harvest is 193 grams per litre of must for the Pinot Gris and Gewurztraminer grape varieties, and 168 grams per litre of must for the other grape varieties. When authorisation for chaptalization is granted, the increase in the minimum average natural alcoholic strength by volume may not exceed 1.5%.

On the advice of the union of producers of the vintage, the regional committee of experts of Alsace wines can annually propose a higher minimum average natural alcoholic strength and sugar content than those mentioned above, as well as a maximum chaptalization amount lower than the rate mentioned above.

=== Vendanges tardives and grains nobles ===
Late harvests refer to wines made from grapes whose harvest has been delayed so as to harvest them overripe, resulting in wines rich in sugar and alcohol, with a more powerful taste. According to law, the must must have at least 243 grams of sugar per liter if it is Gewurztraminer or Pinot Gris (i.e. 14.4% potential alcohol), or at least 220 grams of sugar per liter if it is Riesling or Muscat (i.e. 13.1% of potential alcohol); no chaptalization is allowed.

As for grains nobles, this is a wine made from grapes harvested by successive selective sorting of the grains affected by noble rot (the fungus Botrytis cinerea), which gives even more concentrated, sweeter, liqueur-like wines . According to the legislation, the must must have at least 279 grams of sugar per liter if it is Gewurztraminer or Pinot Gris (i.e. 16.6% potential alcohol ), or at least 256 grams of sugar per liter if it is Riesling or Muscat (i.e. 15.2% potential alcohol). Here too, no Chaptalization is permitted.

=== Vinification ===
The grands crus of Alsace must be harvested manually. On the day of the harvest, upon arrival at the winery, the grapes are crushed and pressed to separate the Must from the grape pomace. For this work, gentler pneumatic presses are gradually replacing horizontal presses with plates. Then the must is put into a vat for settling, which is the drawing off of the juice without the lees, either by filtering or by decanting while waiting for lees to settle at the bottom of the vat.

Alcoholic fermentation begins under the action of indigenous yeasts or selected yeasts: this operation transforms the sugar in the grapes into alcohol. Controlling the fermentation temperature using a refrigeration system – and slowing the process – allows the aromatic potential of the product to be expressed. Once fermentation is complete after one month, the wine is racked to remove the lees. Malolactic fermentation is generally not carried out, blocked by the addition of sulfur dioxide to preserve the acidity of the wine. The latter can be stored in vats to prepare it for bottling or aged in oak barrels or tuns.

The wine is racked, then usually filtered again before being bottled.

== Trade considerations ==
=== Bottle type ===
Alsace wines must be bottled only in flutes, that is to say bottles of the "Rhine wine" type, 750ml in volume, regulated by several decrees. This is even the case for red wines, which cannot be bottled in traditional "Burgundy" bottles.

=== Labelling ===
Throughout the Alsace vineyards, wines are most often identified by their grape variety/varieties: Riesling, Gewurztraminer, etc. This mention dominates the label even if it is optional.

When the Alsace Grand Cru appellation was created the aim was clearly to promote the terroir . The mention of the grape variety is not obligatory and it is possible to put the name of the denomination in larger characters than that of the grape variety. Therefore, several approaches to labelling the bottle are possible, either using simply the name of the appellation and the geographical name (Alsace Grand Cru Hengst), or adding the grape variety (Riesling, Pinot Gris, Gewurztraminer or Muscat). In addition sweet wines can be labelled Sélection de Grains Nobles or Vendanges Tardives, along with the name of a place within the denomination giving options like the following:

- alsace grand cru Hengst;
- alsace grand cru Hengst riesling;
- alsace grand cru Hengst gewurztraminer;
- alsace grand cru Hengst pinot gris;
- alsace grand cru Hengst muscat;
- alsace grand cru Hengst pinot noir
- alsace grand cru Hengst vendanges tardives riesling;
- alsace grand cru Hengst vendanges tardives gewurztraminer;
- alsace grand cru Hengst vendanges tardives pinot gris;
- alsace grand cru Hengst vendanges tardives muscat;
- alsace grand cru Hengst sélection de grains nobles riesling;
- alsace grand cru Hengst sélection de grains nobles gewurztraminer;
- alsace grand cru Hengst sélection de grains nobles pinot gris;
- alsace grand cru Hengst sélection de grains nobles muscat.

== See also ==
=== Bibliography ===
- Vignoble d'Alsace, éditions Benoît France et CIVA, Paris, 2007, carte 88 x 55 cm au 1/120000 ISBN 978-2-84354-158-2.
- Vins d'Alsace : carte touristique, Institut géographique nationale, Paris, 2006, carte 96 x 66 cm au 1/125000 ISBN 978-2-7585-0182-4.
- Serge Dubs et Denis Rizenthaler, Les grands crus d'Alsace, éditions Serpenoise, Metz, 2002, 288 pages ISBN 2-87692-567-2.
- Claude Muller, Les Vins d'Alsace, histoire d'un vignoble, éditions Coprur, Strasbourg, 1999, 192 pages ISBN 2-84208-008-4.
- Le vignoble d'Alsace : la route des vins, Mitra productions, Illkirch, 1995, carte 90 x 34 cm au 1/180000 BnF 40658287.
- Guide des grands crus d'Alsace, Centre d'information des vins d'Alsace, Colmar 1994, 50 pages BnF 36691659.
- Bernadette Burn et Gilles Schmidt, Alsace, clos et grands crus, collection Le Grand Bernard des vins de France, éditions Jacques Legrand, Paris, 1989, 190 pages ISBN 2-905969-24-5.
