= Alsace wine region =

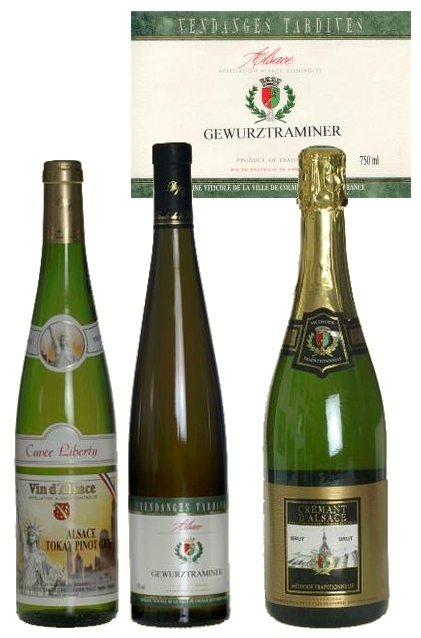
Some Alsacian wines in their specific bottles

The wine region of Alsace produces wines under three different Appellations d'Origine Contrôlées (AOCs): Alsace AOC for white, rosé and red wines, Alsace Grand Cru AOC for white wines from certain classified vineyards and Crémant d'Alsace AOC for sparkling wines. This region is the only French wine region allowed to label its wines based on variety (i.e., varietal wines).

== Alsace AOC ==
Unlike most other French wine regions, there is only one AOC for most wines made in the whole of Alsace. In 2006, 78 per cent of the Alsatian vineyards were producing wine under the Alsace AOC appellation. Other French wine regions have numerous appellations within them, often designating wine from a particular town or, even, an area within a certain town. Alsace AOC wines are often sold with one of the varietal labels or similar designations that are allowed under the AOC rules. In some cases, a lieu-dit, the name of a vineyard, is also displayed on the bottle. Neither the varietal labels or the lieux-dits are separate appellations; all carry "Appellation Alsace Contrôlée" on the label.

== Alsace Grand Cru AOC ==
The Alsace Grand Cru AOC, which is a separate appellation, was not created until 1975. As of 2009, there are currently 51 lieux-dits listed as Grand Cru. All wines labeled with the Alsace Grand Cru designation must be produced from the noble Alsace varieties: Riesling, Muscat, Pinot gris and Gewürztraminer grapes. These wines can be produced as late harvest wines and labeled either Sélection de Grains Nobles (SGN) or Vendange tardive (VT).

== Crémant d'Alsace AOC ==
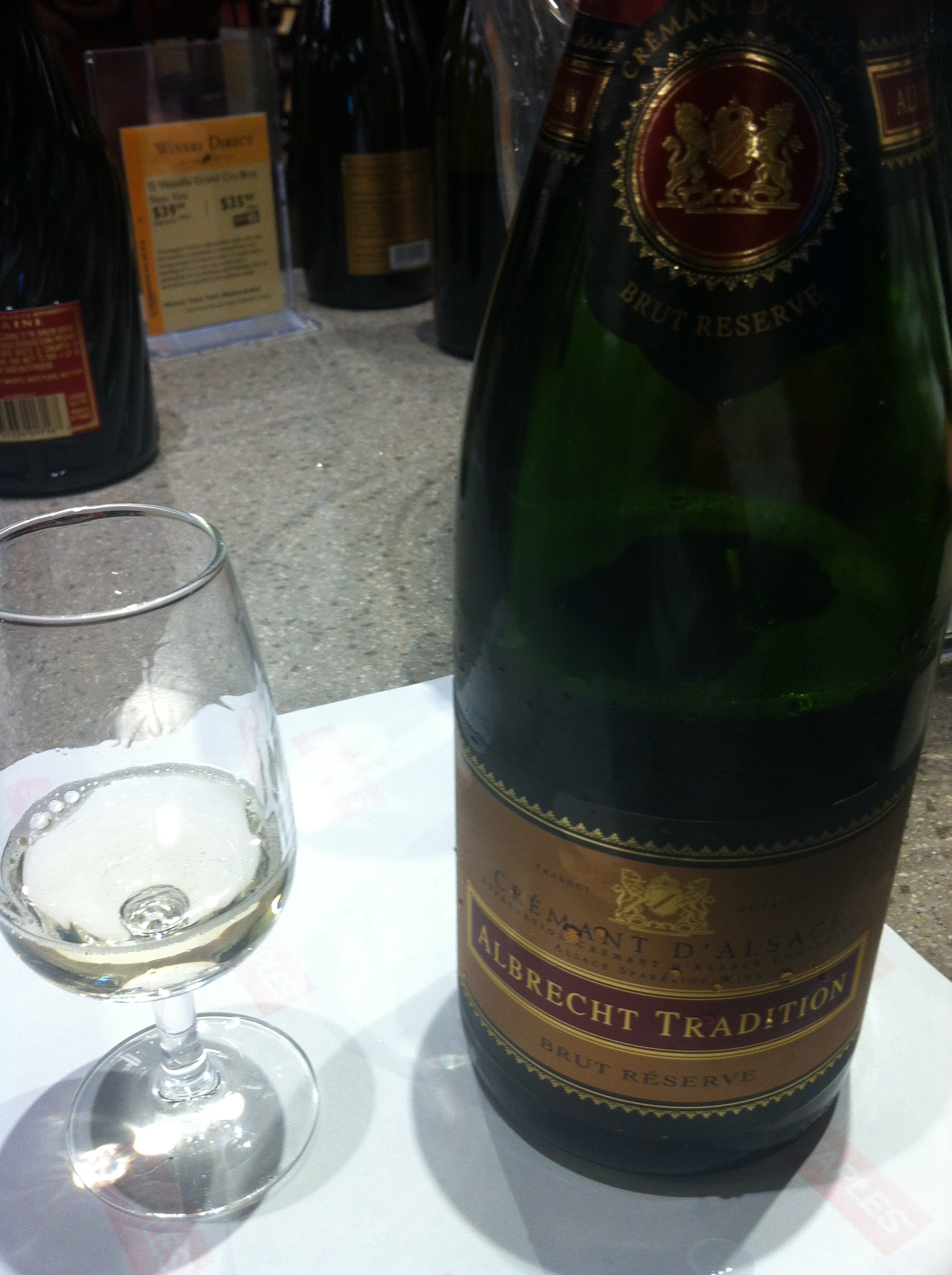
A Crémant d'Alsace made from Pinot blanc

Crémant d'Alsace is an Appellation d'Origine Contrôlée for sparkling wines. It was granted AOC status on August 24, 1976. It is made using the traditional method (secondary in-bottle fermentation), mostly from Pinot blanc grapes, but it may also contain Pinot gris, Riesling, Pinot noir and Chardonnay grapes (Chardonnay may not be used in the two other Alsace appellations). Rosé Crémant d'Alsace is made exclusively from Pinot noir grapes.

Crémant d'Alsace is a significant part of the wine production in Alsace, with 18% of the region's vineyards used for this purpose. 223 942 hectoliter of Crémant d'Alsace, approximately 30 million bottles, were produced in 2006.

The history of sparkling wine production in Alsace goes back to around 1900, when Julien Dopff is said to have applied the "champagne method" to his own Alsatian wines with satisfactory results.
