= Hengst =

Hengst may refer to:

- Hengst AOC, a wine region in Alsace, France
- Hengst (surname)
- Hengst Automotive
- Hengst, the highest mountain summit in Schrattenfluh, part of the Swiss Alps

== See also ==
- Hengist (disambiguation)
