= Hengst (surname) =

Hengst is a German surname. Notable people with the name include:

- Claudia Hengst (1969), German paralympic athlete
- Sandra Hengst (1973), German footballer
- Stefan Hengst (1994), German slalom canoeist

== See also ==
- Hengst (disambiguation)
