= Hengist (disambiguation) =

Hengist is an Anglo-Saxon leader in British legend.

Hengist may also refer to:

- Hengist, King of Kent, a 17th-century play about the Saxon king by Thomas Middleton
- MV Hengist, a ferry formerly used in the Dover-to-Calais channel crossing
- Slingsby Hengist, a British World War II glider
- Hengest, a Jutish hero appearing in Beowulf and the Finnesburg Fragment, who may or may not be the same as the above king
- G-AAXE Hengist, a biplane airliner built in 1931 by Handley Page
- A character from the Star Trek episode Wolf in the Fold

== See also ==
- Hengst (disambiguation)
