= Ammerschwihr =

Commune in Grand Est, France

- Commune
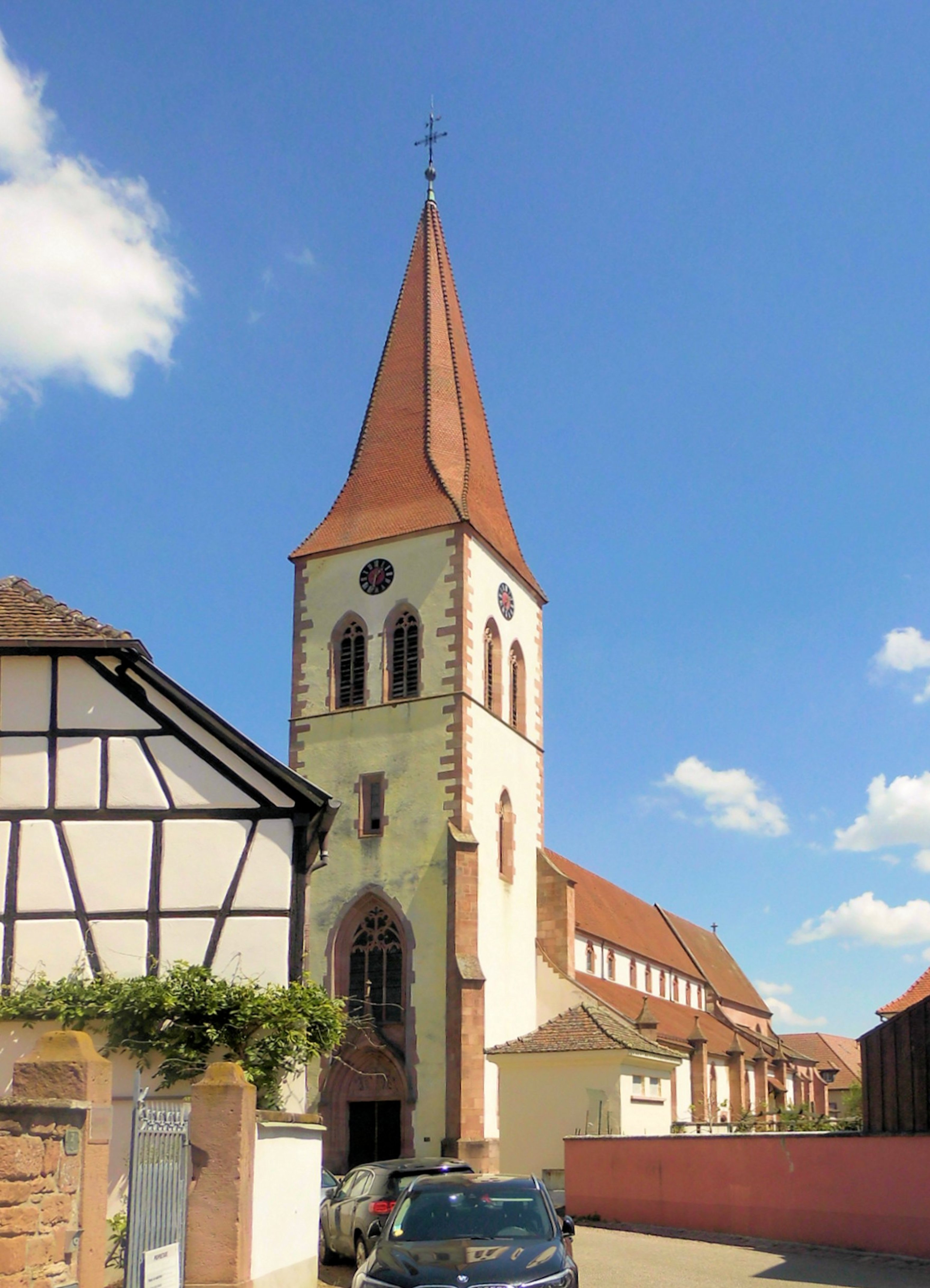
- The church in Ammerschwihr

- Coat of arms
- Location of Ammerschwihr
- Location within France Location within Grand Est
- Coordinates: 48°07′34″N 7°16′57″E
- Country: France
- Region: Grand Est
- Department: Haut-Rhin
- Arrondissement: Colmar-Ribeauvillé
- Canton: Sainte-Marie-aux-Mines
- Intercommunality: Vallée de Kaysersberg

Government
  - Mayor (2020–2026): Patrick Reinstettel
- Area^{1}: 19.66 km^{2} (7.59 sq mi)
- Elevation: 240 m (790 ft)
- Highest elevation: 882 m (2,894 ft)
- Lowest elevation: 193 m (633 ft)
- Population (2023): 1,580
  - Density: 80.4/km^{2} (208/sq mi)
- Time zone: UTC+01:00 (CET)
  - Summer (DST): UTC+02:00 (CEST)
- INSEE/Postal code: 68005 /68770
- ^{1} French Land Register data, which excludes lakes, ponds, glaciers > 1 km^{2} (0.386 sq mi or 247 acres) and river estuaries.

Ammerschwihr (French pronunciation: [aməʁʃviʁ]; German: Ammerschweier) is a commune in the Haut-Rhin department in Grand Est in north-eastern France.

Its inhabitants are called Ammerschwihriens.

== Geography ==
Ammerschwihr is a small town located on the Wine Road of Alsace. Its main economical resources come from wine-growing, in particular its famous vineyard Kaefferkopf, situated on a hill, and one of the Alsace Grand Cru vineyards.

=== Climate ===
Ammerschwihr has an oceanic climate (Köppen climate classification Cfb). The average annual temperature in Ammerschwihr is 9.4 °C (48.9 °F). The average annual rainfall is 828.0 mm (32.60 in) with December as the wettest month. The temperatures are highest on average in July, at around 18.3 °C (64.9 °F), and lowest in January, at around 1.2 °C (34.2 °F). The highest temperature ever recorded in Ammerschwihr was 35.7 °C (96.3 °F) on 7 August 2015; the coldest temperature ever recorded was −20.0 °C (−4.0 °F) on 13 January 1987.

Climate data for Ammerschwihr (1991–2020 normals, extremes 1986−present)
Month	Jan	Feb	Mar	Apr	May	Jun	Jul	Aug	Sep	Oct	Nov	Dec	Year
Record high °C (°F)	17.7 (63.9)	19.4 (66.9)	23.5 (74.3)	26.6 (79.9)	30.9 (87.6)	35.4 (95.7)	35.5 (95.9)	35.7 (96.3)	30.4 (86.7)	26.7 (80.1)	20.6 (69.1)	18.6 (65.5)	35.7 (96.3)
Mean daily maximum °C (°F)	4.0 (39.2)	4.8 (40.6)	8.7 (47.7)	13.1 (55.6)	17.1 (62.8)	20.9 (69.6)	22.9 (73.2)	22.7 (72.9)	18.1 (64.6)	13.1 (55.6)	7.8 (46.0)	4.7 (40.5)	13.2 (55.8)
Daily mean °C (°F)	1.4 (34.5)	2.1 (35.8)	5.4 (41.7)	9.2 (48.6)	13.2 (55.8)	16.8 (62.2)	18.8 (65.8)	18.7 (65.7)	14.5 (58.1)	10.2 (50.4)	5.3 (41.5)	2.3 (36.1)	9.8 (49.6)
Mean daily minimum °C (°F)	−1.1 (30.0)	−0.7 (30.7)	2.1 (35.8)	5.4 (41.7)	9.2 (48.6)	12.6 (54.7)	14.7 (58.5)	14.7 (58.5)	10.9 (51.6)	7.2 (45.0)	2.7 (36.9)	0.0 (32.0)	6.5 (43.7)
Record low °C (°F)	−20.0 (−4.0)	−17.4 (0.7)	−13.5 (7.7)	−7.0 (19.4)	−0.5 (31.1)	3.2 (37.8)	6.3 (43.3)	6.2 (43.2)	2.5 (36.5)	−4.2 (24.4)	−11.7 (10.9)	−17.1 (1.2)	−20.0 (−4.0)
Average precipitation mm (inches)	67.5 (2.66)	56.6 (2.23)	54.5 (2.15)	53.1 (2.09)	81.7 (3.22)	73.6 (2.90)	73.4 (2.89)	69.3 (2.73)	60.1 (2.37)	74.3 (2.93)	61.1 (2.41)	79.3 (3.12)	804.5 (31.67)
Average precipitation days (≥ 1.0 mm)	10.5	9.3	9.8	9.5	12.0	10.5	10.8	10.0	8.6	10.4	10.6	11.0	122.9
Source: Meteociel

== Demography ==
Historical population

Year	Pop.	±% p.a.
1793	1,940	—
1800	1,676	−2.07%
1806	1,997	+2.96%
1821	1,946	−0.17%
1831	2,137	+0.94%
1836	2,136	−0.01%
1841	2,149	+0.12%
1846	2,228	+0.72%
1851	2,205	−0.21%
1856	2,014	−1.80%
1861	2,036	+0.22%
1866	1,979	−0.57%
1871	1,862	−1.21%
1875	1,767	−1.30%
1880	1,766	−0.01%
1885	1,676	−1.04%
1890	1,756	+0.94%
1895	1,722	−0.39%
1900	1,639	−0.98%

Year	Pop.	±% p.a.
1905	1,584	−0.68%
1910	1,565	−0.24%
1921	1,384	−1.11%
1926	1,402	+0.26%
1931	1,427	+0.35%
1936	1,507	+1.10%
1946	885	−5.18%
1954	1,424	+6.13%
1962	1,341	−0.75%
1968	1,406	+0.79%
1975	1,448	+0.42%
1982	1,566	+1.13%
1990	1,869	+2.24%
1999	1,892	+0.14%
2007	1,913	+0.14%
2012	1,773	−1.51%
2017	1,779	+0.07%
2023	1,580	−1.96%

Source: EHESS and INSEE (1968-2023)

== See also ==
- Communes of the Haut-Rhin department
