= Westhalten =

Commune in Grand Est, France

- Commune
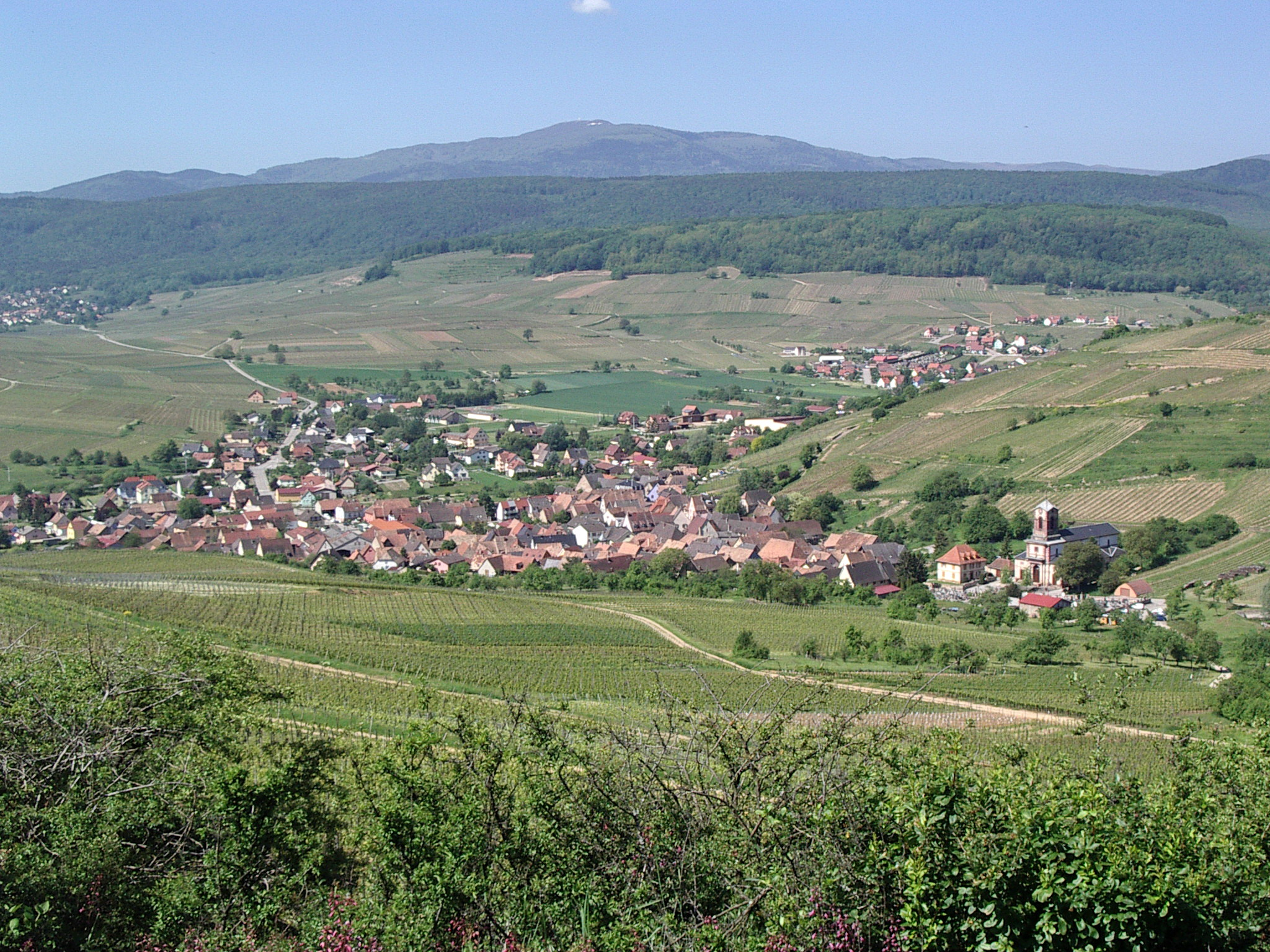
- A general view of Westhalten

- Coat of arms
- Location of Westhalten
- Location within France Location within Grand Est
- Coordinates: 47°57′28″N 7°15′34″E
- Country: France
- Region: Grand Est
- Department: Haut-Rhin
- Arrondissement: Thann-Guebwiller
- Canton: Wintzenheim
- Intercommunality: Pays de Rouffach, Vignobles et Châteaux

Government
  - Mayor (2020–2026): Nathalie Lallemand
- Area^{1}: 10.98 km^{2} (4.24 sq mi)
- Elevation: 240 m (790 ft)
- Highest elevation: 576 m (1,890 ft)
- Lowest elevation: 217 m (712 ft)
- Population (2023): 1,017
  - Density: 92.62/km^{2} (239.9/sq mi)
- Time zone: UTC+01:00 (CET)
  - Summer (DST): UTC+02:00 (CEST)
- INSEE/Postal code: 68364 /68250
- ^{1} French Land Register data, which excludes lakes, ponds, glaciers > 1 km^{2} (0.386 sq mi or 247 acres) and river estuaries.

Westhalten (French pronunciation: [vɛstaltən]) is a commune in the Haut-Rhin department in Grand Est in north-eastern France.

Its vineyards produce three of the finest Alsacian wines: the Grands Crus Steinert, Vorbourg and Zinnkoepflé.

== Population ==
Historical population
Year	Pop.	±% p.a.
1968	707	—
1975	761	+1.06%
1982	745	−0.30%
1990	770	+0.41%
1999	816	+0.65%
2007	915	+1.44%
2012	981	+1.40%
2017	988	+0.14%
2023	1,017	+0.48%
Source: INSEE

== See also ==
- Communes of the Haut-Rhin department
