= Zellenberg =

Commune in Grand Est, France

- Commune
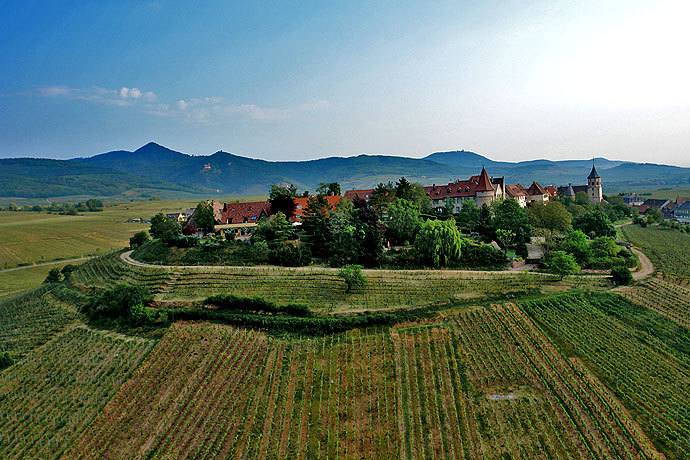
- An aerial view of Zellenberg

- Coat of arms
- Location of Zellenberg
- Location within France Location within Grand Est
- Coordinates: 48°10′18″N 7°19′14″E
- Country: France
- Region: Grand Est
- Department: Haut-Rhin
- Arrondissement: Colmar-Ribeauvillé
- Canton: Sainte-Marie-aux-Mines
- Intercommunality: Pays de Ribeauvillé

Government
  - Mayor (2020–2026): Christian Keller
- Area^{1}: 4.96 km^{2} (1.92 sq mi)
- Highest elevation: 374 m (1,227 ft)
- Lowest elevation: 183 m (600 ft)
- Population (2023): 321
  - Density: 64.7/km^{2} (168/sq mi)
- Demonym(s): Zellenbergeois, Zellenbergeoises
- Time zone: UTC+01:00 (CET)
  - Summer (DST): UTC+02:00 (CEST)
- INSEE/Postal code: 68383 /68340
- ^{1} French Land Register data, which excludes lakes, ponds, glaciers > 1 km^{2} (0.386 sq mi or 247 acres) and river estuaries.

Zellenberg is a commune in the Haut-Rhin department in Grand Est in north-eastern France.

== Population ==
Historical population

Year	Pop.	±% p.a.
1793	430	—
1821	463	+0.26%
1846	459	−0.03%
1871	406	−0.49%
1900	412	+0.05%
1926	278	−1.50%
1946	317	+0.66%
1962	304	−0.26%
1968	311	+0.38%

Year	Pop.	±% p.a.
1975	327	+0.72%
1982	354	+1.14%
1990	343	−0.39%
1999	391	+1.47%
2007	403	+0.38%
2012	357	−2.39%
2017	322	−2.04%
2023	321	−0.05%

Source: EHESS (1793-1999) and INSEE

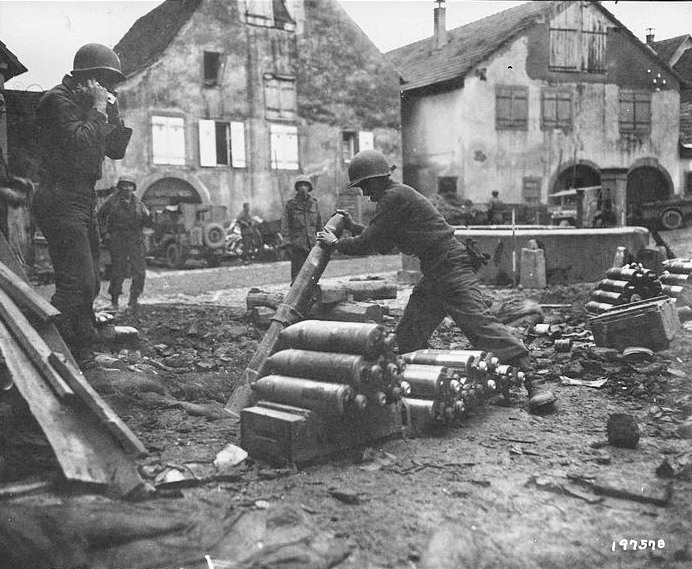
Company D, 83rd Chemical Bn, in Zellenberg. targeting Germans in nearby Mittelwihr with their 4.2 inch mortars, 9 December 1944.

== See also ==
- Communes of the Haut-Rhin department
