= Ribeauville =

- Commune
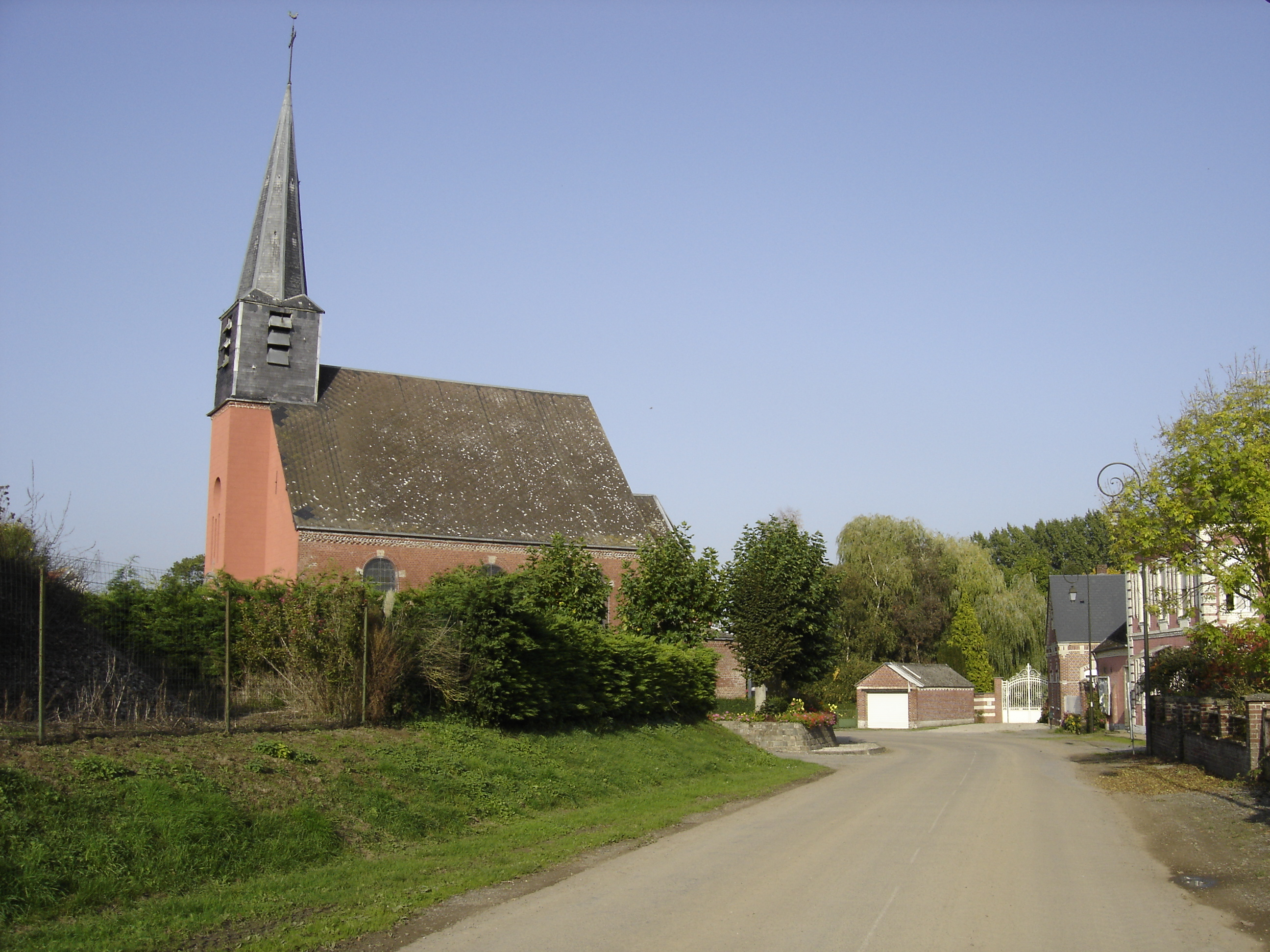
- The church of Ribeauville
- Location of Ribeauville
- Location within France Location within Hauts-de-France
- Coordinates: 50°02′37″N 3°35′12″E
- Country: France
- Region: Hauts-de-France
- Department: Aisne
- Arrondissement: Vervins
- Canton: Guise

Government
  - Mayor (2026–32): Hervé Hotot
- Area^{1}: 3.58 km^{2} (1.38 sq mi)
- Elevation: 150 m (490 ft)
- Highest elevation: 162 m (531 ft)
- Lowest elevation: 144 m (472 ft)
- Population (2023): 86
  - Density: 24/km^{2} (62/sq mi)
- Time zone: UTC+01:00 (CET)
  - Summer (DST): UTC+02:00 (CEST)
- INSEE/Postal code: 02647 /02110
- ^{1} French Land Register data, which excludes lakes, ponds, glaciers > 1 km^{2} (0.386 sq mi or 247 acres) and river estuaries.

Ribeauville (French pronunciation: [ʁibovil]) is a commune in the Aisne department in Hauts-de-France in northern France.

Beekeepers from the area were puzzled when their bees began producing blue honey until it was discovered that a nearby biogas plant processes waste from the manufacturing of M&M's.

== Population ==
Historical population
Year	Pop.	±% p.a.
1968	126	—
1975	113	−1.54%
1982	100	−1.73%
1990	86	−1.87%
1999	74	−1.66%
2007	83	+1.45%
2012	75	−2.01%
2017	63	−3.43%
2023	86	+5.32%
Source: INSEE

== See also ==
- Communes of the Aisne department
