= Wettolsheim =

Commune in Grand Est, France

- Commune
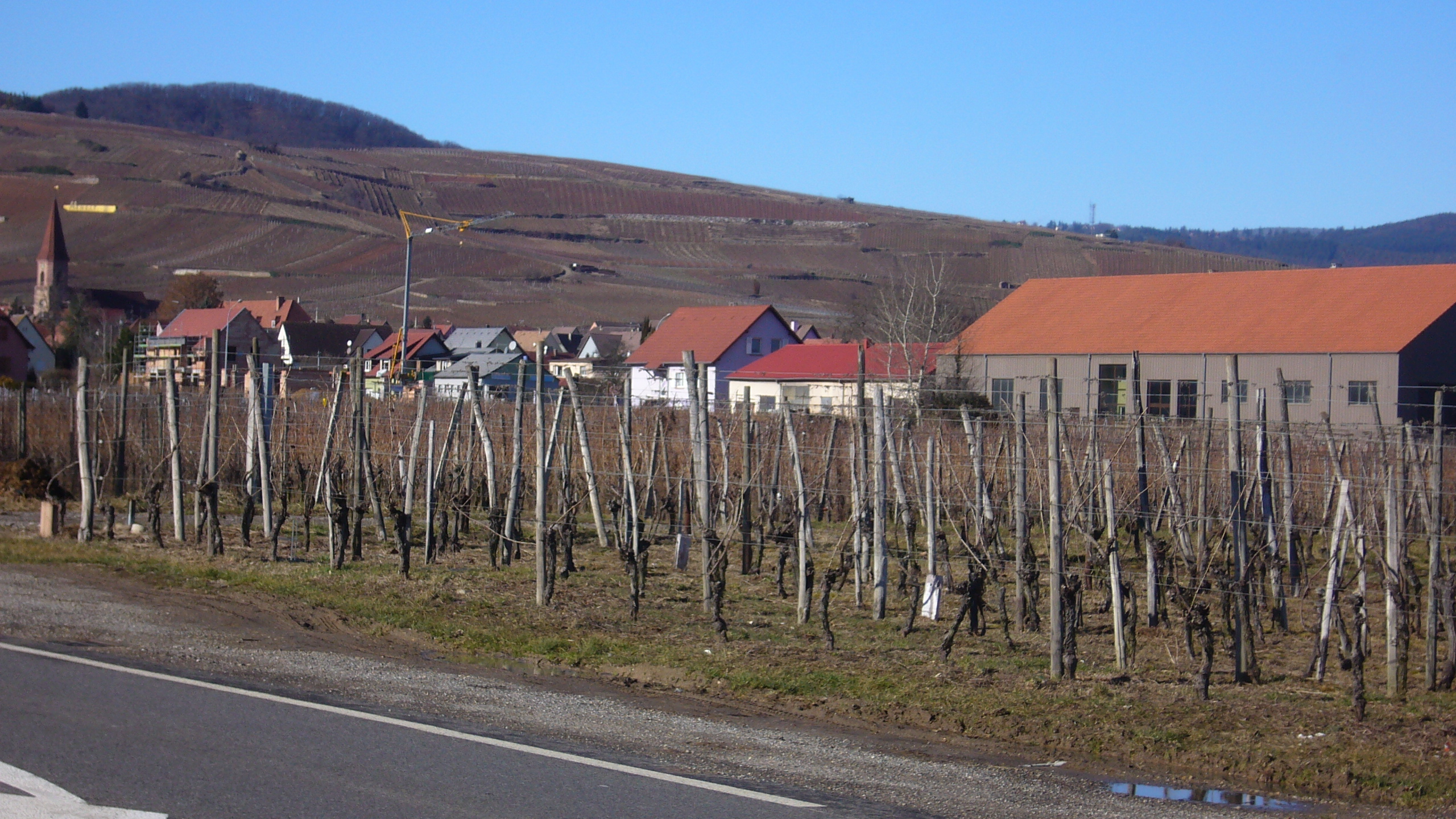
- The road into Wettolsheim

- Coat of arms
- Location of Wettolsheim
- Location within France Location within Grand Est
- Coordinates: 48°03′28″N 7°18′00″E
- Country: France
- Region: Grand Est
- Department: Haut-Rhin
- Arrondissement: Colmar-Ribeauvillé
- Canton: Wintzenheim
- Intercommunality: Colmar Agglomération

Government
  - Mayor (2020–2026): Lucien Muller
- Area^{1}: 8.86 km^{2} (3.42 sq mi)
- Elevation: 220 m (720 ft)
- Highest elevation: 688 m (2,257 ft)
- Lowest elevation: 188 m (617 ft)
- Population (2023): 1,784
  - Density: 201/km^{2} (522/sq mi)
- Time zone: UTC+01:00 (CET)
  - Summer (DST): UTC+02:00 (CEST)
- INSEE/Postal code: 68365 /68920
- ^{1} French Land Register data, which excludes lakes, ponds, glaciers > 1 km^{2} (0.386 sq mi or 247 acres) and river estuaries.

Wettolsheim (French pronunciation: [vɛtɔlsaim]) is a commune in the Haut-Rhin department in Grand Est in north-eastern France.

It is situated at the eastern margin of the southern Vosges Mountains. The commune is part of the Parc naturel régional des Ballons des Vosges.

== Places of interest ==
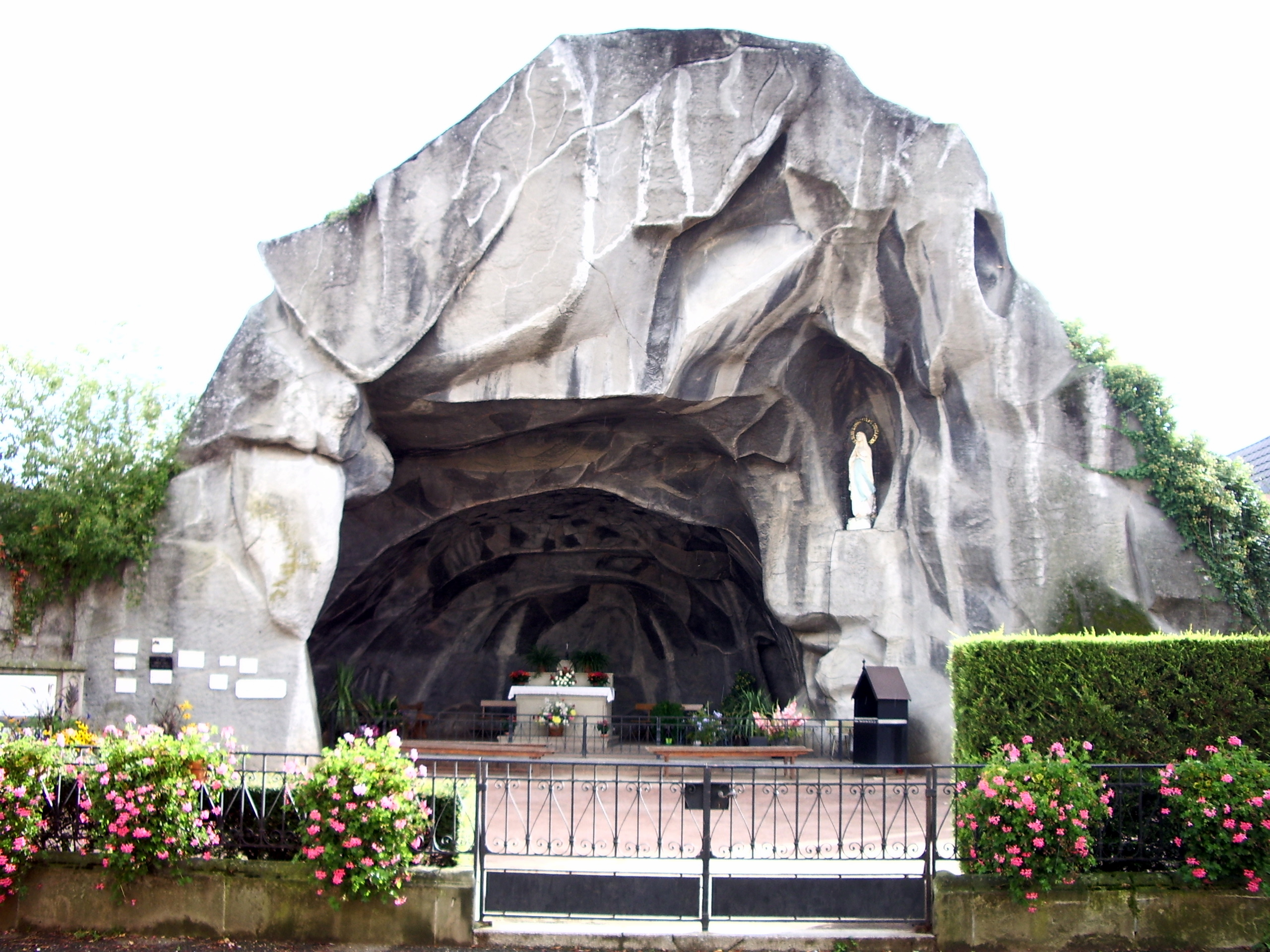
Grotte de Lourdes grandeur réelle

Grotte de Lourdes grandeur réelle: In 1912, after the destruction of the house of his birth by a fire, archbishop François-Xavier Schoepfer (1843–1927), bishop of Tarbes and Lourdes from 1899 until 1927, decided to let build an exact copy of the grotto Massabielle in Lourdes at the same place where the house stood. The statue of the Virgin Mary was placed on a stone coming from the site where St. Bernadette Soubirous first saw the Immaculate Conception in 1858. The cavern in the heart of the village is still hosts many religious ceremonies.

== Population ==
Historical population
Year	Pop.	±% p.a.
1968	1,301	—
1975	1,558	+2.61%
1982	1,554	−0.04%
1990	1,616	+0.49%
1999	1,692	+0.51%
2007	1,701	+0.07%
2012	1,682	−0.22%
2017	1,733	+0.60%
2023	1,784	+0.48%
Source: INSEE

== See also ==
- Communes of the Haut-Rhin department
