= Sulfidation =

Umbrella term covering different chemical reactions

Sulfidation (British spelling also sulphidation) is a process of installing sulfide ions in a material or molecule. The process is widely used to convert oxides to sulfides but is also related to corrosion and surface modification.

== Inorganic, materials, and organic chemistry ==
Sulfidation is relevant to the formation of sulfide minerals.

A large scale application of sulfidation is the conversion of molybdenum oxides to the corresponding sulfides. This conversion is a step in the preparation of catalysts for hydrodesulfurization wherein alumina impregnated with molybdate salts are converted to molybdenum disulfide by the action of hydrogen sulfide.

In organosulfur chemistry, sulfiding is often called thiation. The preparation of thioamides from amides involves thiation. A typical reagent is phosphorus pentasulfide (P_{4}S_{10}). The idealized equation for this conversion is:

RC(O)NH_{2} + 1/4 P_{4}S_{10} → RC(S)NH_{2} + 1/4 P_{4}S_{6}O_{4}

This conversion where an oxygen atom in the amide function is replaced by a sulfur atom involves no redox reaction.

== Sulfidation of metals ==
It is known that aluminum improves the sulfidation resistance of iron alloys. The sulfidation of tungsten is a multiple step process. The first step is an oxidation reaction, converting the tungsten to a tungsten bronze on the surface of the object. The tungsten bronze coating is then converted to a sulfide.

One commonly encountered occurrence of sulfidation in manufacturing environments involves the sulfidic corrosion of metal piping. The increased resistance to corrosion found in stainless steel is attributed to a layer of chromium oxide that forms due to oxidation of the chromium found in the alloy.

The process of liquid sulfidation has also been used in the manufacturing of diamond-like carbon films. These films are generally used to coat surfaces to reduce the wear due to friction. The inclusion of sulfidation in the process has been shown to reduce the friction coefficient of the diamond-like carbon film.
