= Lieu-dit =

French toponymic term

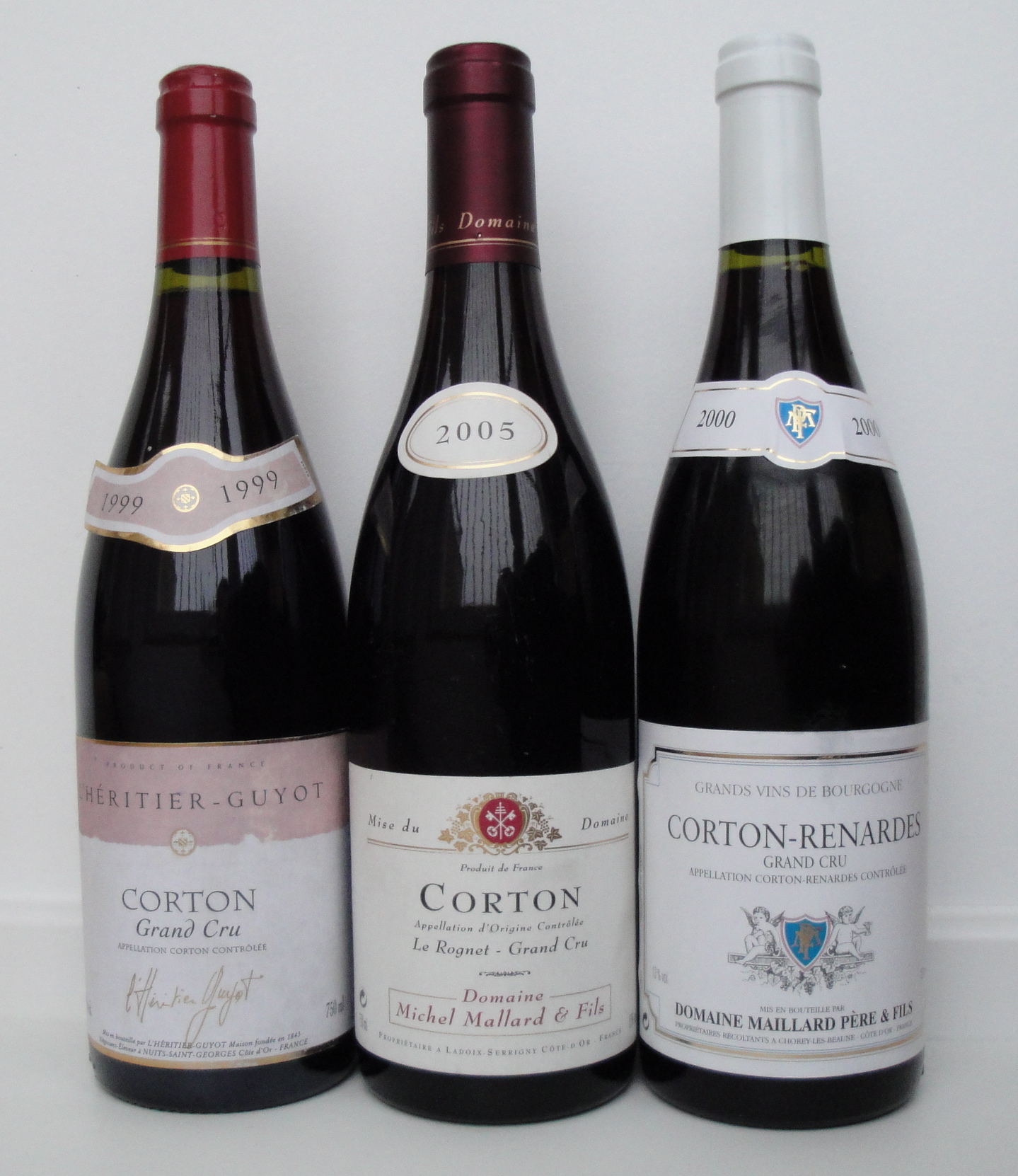
Three bottles of red Corton AOC wine, from the same appellation, showing different usages of lieu-dit (climat) designations on labels, in addition to the appellation's name. On the left, a wine with no indication of specific lieu-dit, in the middle a wine where Le Rognet is indicated in small print, and on the right a wine from Les Renardes, written hyphenated with Corton as "Corton-Renardes".

Lieu-dit (French pronunciation: [ljø.di]; plural: lieux-dits) (literally location-said, "named place") is a French toponymic term for a small geographical area bearing a traditional name. The name usually refers to some characteristic of the place, its former use, a past event, etc. A lieu-dit may be uninhabited, which distinguishes it from an hameau (hamlet), which is inhabited. In Burgundy, the term climat is used interchangeably with lieu-dit.

== Etymology ==
English speakers seem to have discovered the concept through oenology and have considered it as a wine term which in its typical usage translates as "vineyard name" or "named vineyard". Typically, a lieu-dit is the smallest piece of land which has a traditional vineyard name assigned to it. In most cases, this means that a lieu-dit is smaller than an appellation d'origine contrôlée (AOC).

== Use in France ==
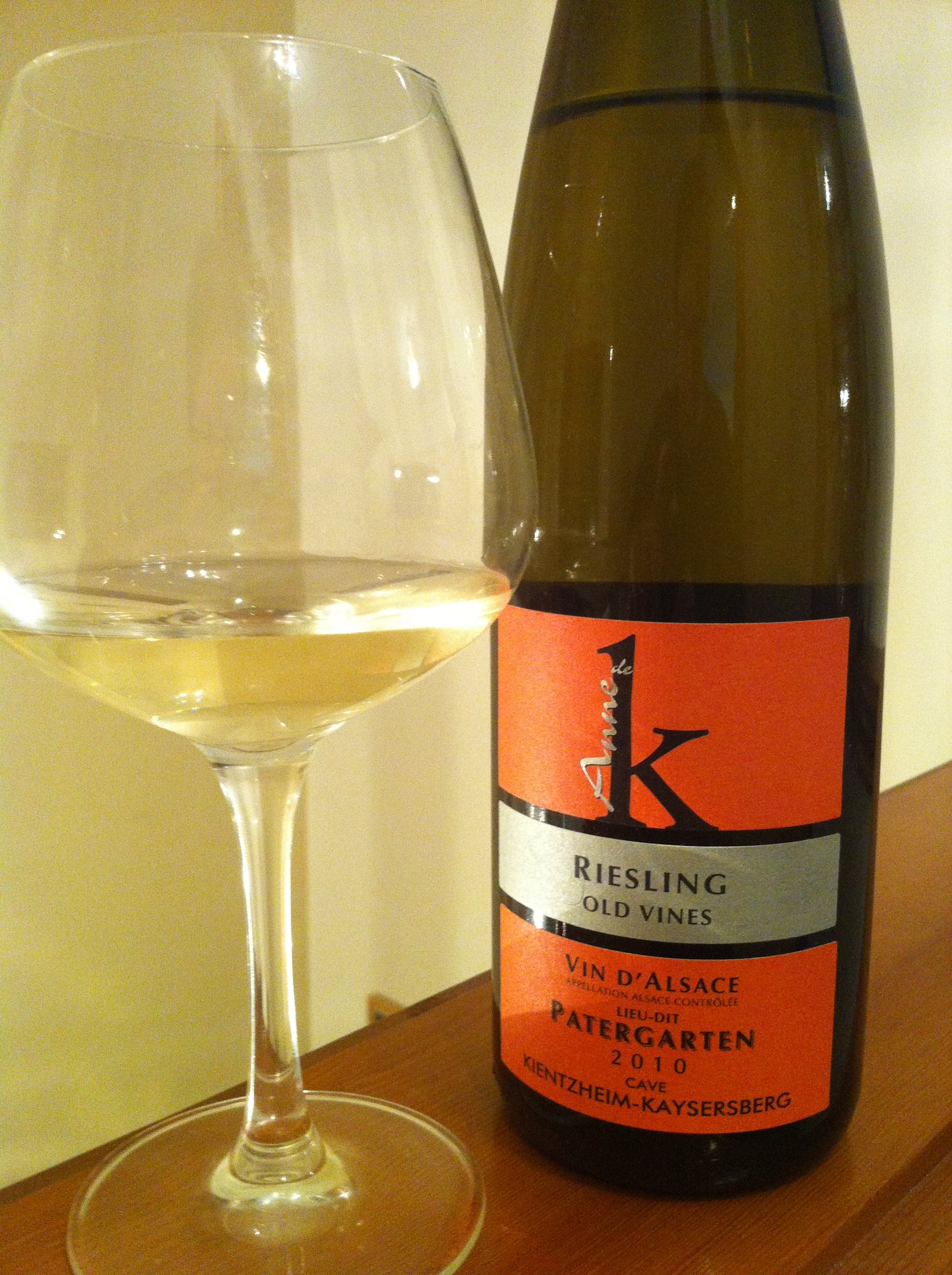
An Alsatian Riesling with the name of the lieu-dit it is sourced from on the label.

In some cases, lieux-dits appear on wine labels, in addition to the AOC name. This is most commonly seen for Alsace wine and Burgundy wine. It may not always be easy for consumers to tell if a name on a wine label is a lieu-dit or a cuvée name created by the producer.

The only case of mandatory mention of a lieu-dit is in Alsace, for Alsace Grand Cru AOC. The Grand Cru designation may only be used if a lieu-dit is indicated. Lieux-dits may also be indicated on regular Alsace AOC wines, but is not mandatory.

In Burgundy, the term climat is used interchangeably with lieu-dit. The use of the lieu-dit varies with the level of classification of the wine. Although the Grand Cru burgundies are generally considered to be classified on the vineyard level and defined as separate AOCs (with the exception of Chablis Grand Cru), some Burgundy Grand Crus are in fact divided into several lieux-dits. An example is Corton, where it is fairly common to see lieux-dits such as Les Bressandes, Le Clos de Roi and Les Renardes indicated. For village level burgundies, the lieu-dit may only be indicated in smaller print than the village name to avoid confusion with Premier Cru burgundies, where the village and vineyard name are indicated in the same size print.

In Rhône, lieux-dits are most commonly seen for some of the top wines of the region. Two examples are the lieu-dit La Landonne or La Chatillonne within Côte-Rôtie. Not all sites have been registered as lieux-dits. For example La Mouline and Les Jumelles are les marques of individual producers.

== Outside France ==
In the United States, the labeling of vineyard designated wines follows the similar practice of highlighting the particular vineyard that the grapes are sourced from.
