= Muscat Ottonel =

Variety of grape

- Grape (Vitis)
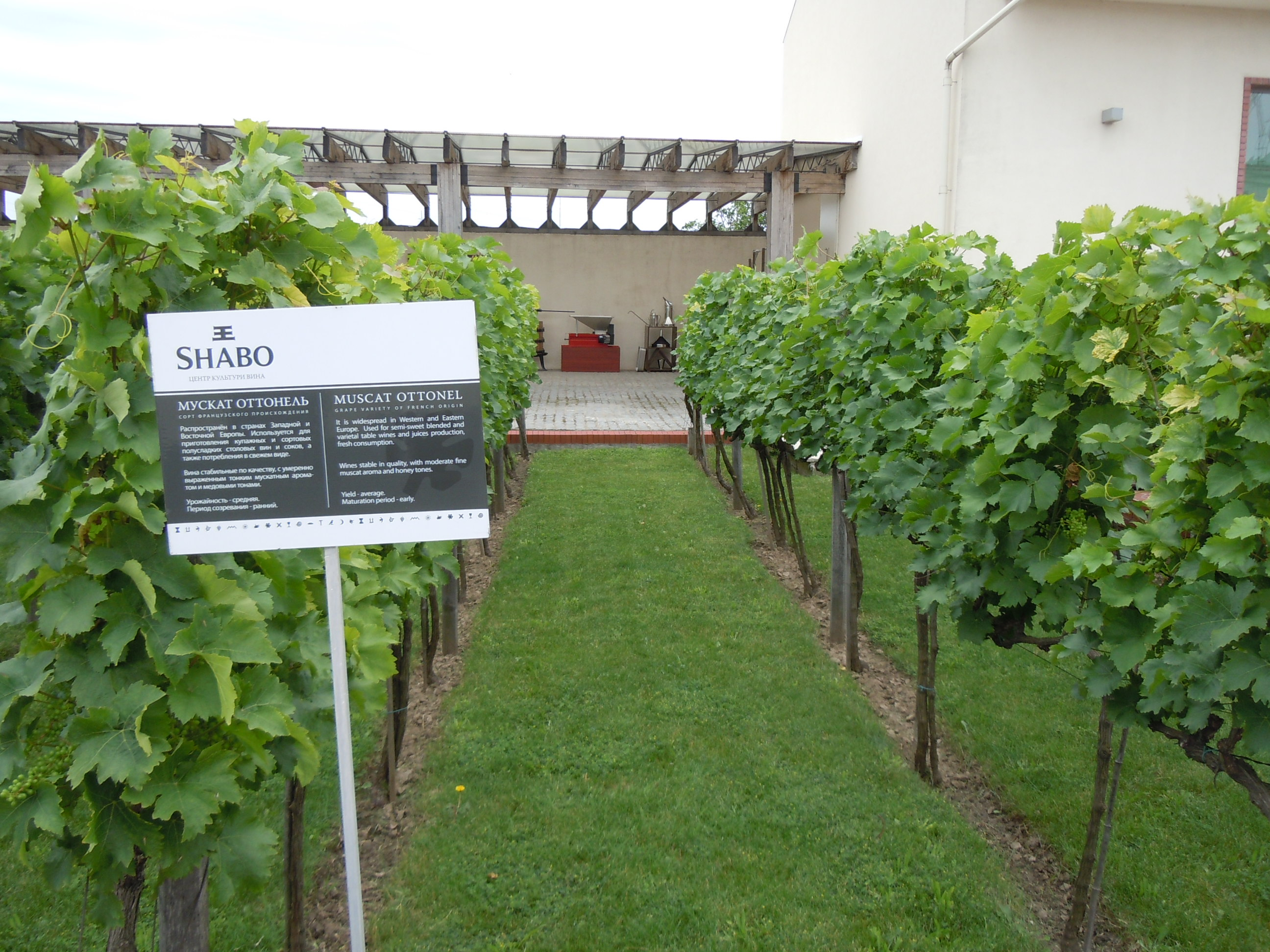
- Color of berry skin: Blanc
- Species: Vitis vinifera
- Also called: Muskat-Ottonel, other synonyms
- Origin: France
- VIVC number: 8243

Muscat Ottonel or Muskat-Ottonel (in Germany) is a white wine grape variety that is a member of the Muscat family of Vitis vinifera. It is most notable for its use in dessert wines from Austria, Bulgaria, Romania, Moldova, Croatia and Serbia as well as dry wines from Alsace and Hungary. In Alsace, the varietal designation Muscat d'Alsace is allowed for the varieties Muscat Ottonel, Muscat blanc à petit grains and Muscat rose à petit grains blended in any combination -or not- (but not for other members of the Muscat family), and blends between these are not allowed for most Alsace Grands Crus.

First cultivated in Alsace by the Loire grower Moreau-Robert in 1852, Muscat Ottonel is believed to be a cross of Chasselas with Muscat de Saumur (which was originally given as "Muscat d'Eisenstadt").

== Synonyms ==
Over the years, Muscat Ottonel has been known under a variety of synonyms including: Chasselas Saint Fiacre, Mirisavka, Mirislavka, Misket Ottonel, Moscato Otonel bianco, Moscato Ottonel, Moscatos, Mozzonel, Muscadel Ottonel (in South Africa), Muscat Otonel blanc, Muscat Otonel White, Muscat Ottone, Muscat Ottonel Weiss, Muscats, Muskat Otonel (in Bulgaria), Muskat Otonel Bijeli, Muskat Otonel Weisser, Muskat Ottonel (in Austria, Germany and Slovenia), Muskotally, Muskotály (in Hungary), Ottonel, Ottonel Frontignan, Ottonel Muscotally, Ottonel Muskotály (in Hungary), Tămîioasă Ottonel, Muscat de Craciunel Tirnave (in Romania) and Tamiioasa Ottonel.
