= Muscat Rose à Petits Grains =

Variety of grape

- Grape (Vitis)
- Color of berry skin: Rose
- Species: Vitis vinifera
- Also called: Moscato Rosa, other synonyms
- Origin: Greece
- VIVC number: 8057

Muscat Rose à Petits Grains (French pronunciation: [myska ʁoz a pəti ɡʁɛ̃]) is a wine grape for white wine that is a member of the Muscat family of Vitis vinifera. Its name comes from its characteristic small berry size and tight clusters, and from its skin colour. It's a variation of the more common Muscat Blanc à Petits Grains with a pinkish colour. Muscat Rouge à Petits Grains is a further variation with deeper skin colour.

It originates from Greece, and is one of three varieties, together with Muscat Blanc à Petits Grains and Muscat Ottonel, allowed for Alsace wine labelled Muscat d'Alsace.

== Synonyms ==
Muscat Rose à Petits Grains is known under the synonyms Moscatel Roxo, Moscato Rosa, Muscat à Petits Grains Roses, and Red Frontignac. Muscato Rosa is also the primary name of another Muscat variety, mostly grown in Italy, and which is known as Muscat Rose in French, i.e., without the "Petits Grains" part.
