= Schoenenbourg (grand cru) =

Coordinates: 48°10′09″N 7°18′20″E

- Wine region
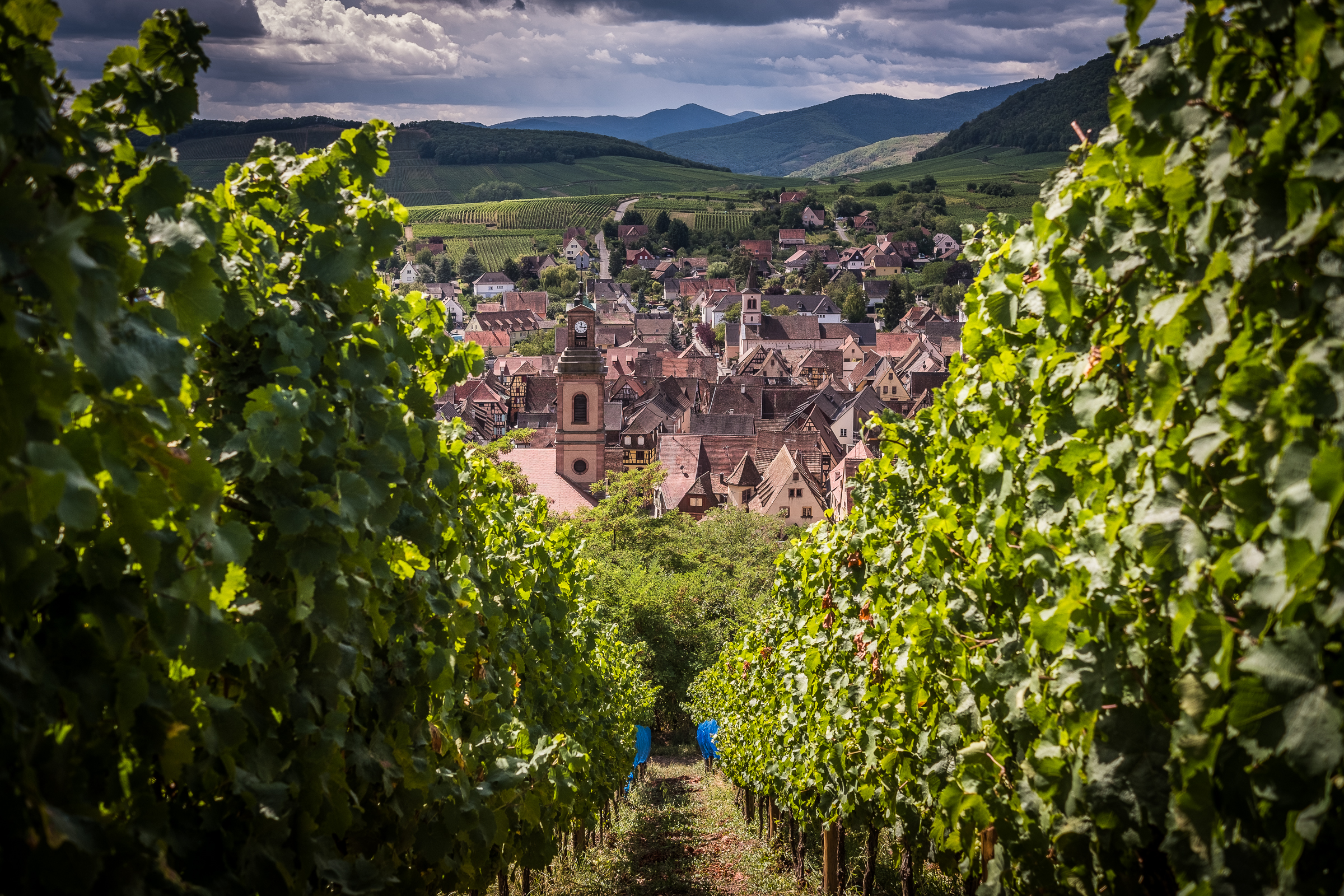
- Type: AOC
- Year established: 1992
- Country: France
- Soil conditions: Keuper, marl, dolomite, gypsum
- Total area: 53.4 ha
- Grapes produced: Riesling, Muscat, Pinot gris
- Official designation(s): Grand Cru

The Alsatian Grand Cru vineyard Schoenenbourg (French pronunciation: [ʃønənbuʁ]) is situated north of the village Riquewihr. The vineyard faces south and south-east on the steep hill Schoenenbourg. The altitude of the vines are between 265 and 380 meters and covers 53.4 ha of Keuper subsoil with marl, gypsum and dolomite.

== History ==
Viticulture at Schoenenbourg goes back hundreds of years. The philosopher Voltaire owned vineyards at the site and the wine from Schoenenbourg was admired throughout northern Europe.

While the Grand Cru designation was being developed in the 1970s, Schoenenbourg was not to wear those laurels until a decree in 1992.

== Varietals ==
Schoenenbourg is planted mainly with Riesling, Muscat and Pinot gris

== Wine Styles ==
Schoenenbourg is home to both dry wines, late harvested "Vendanges Tardives" and the noble sweet wines called Selection de Grains Nobles

== Producers ==
Hugel & Fils
Marcel Deiss
Dopff au Moulin
Dopff & Irion
Domaine Charles Sparr
Domaine Bott Geyl
Domaine Agapé
