= Hugel & Fils =

Winery in Riquewihr, Alsace, France

Coordinates: 48.1665°N 7.2972°E

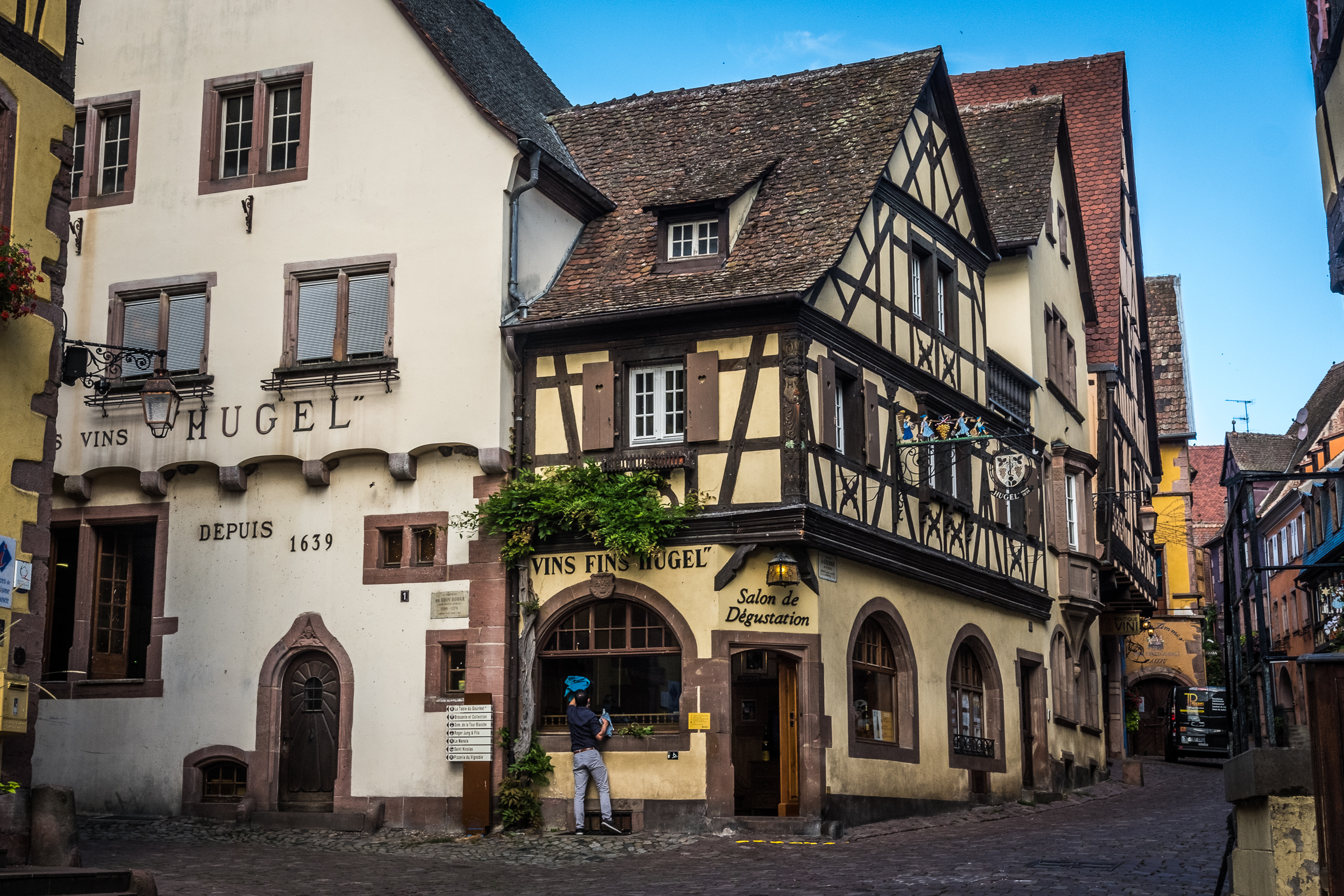
Hugel & Fils in central Riquewihr

Hugel & Fils is a winery in Riquewihr, Alsace, France. Hugel & Fils is one of the major producers of Alsace wine, and has been an important force in the Alsace wine industry in its developments during the second half of the 20th century.

Hugel & Fils produces its high-end wines from its own vineyards, and also operates a négociant business, which sources additional grapes under long-term contract from various growers. Hugel is highly export-oriented, with almost 80 percent of the wines produced being exported.

The Hugel family are members of the Primum Familiae Vini.

== History ==
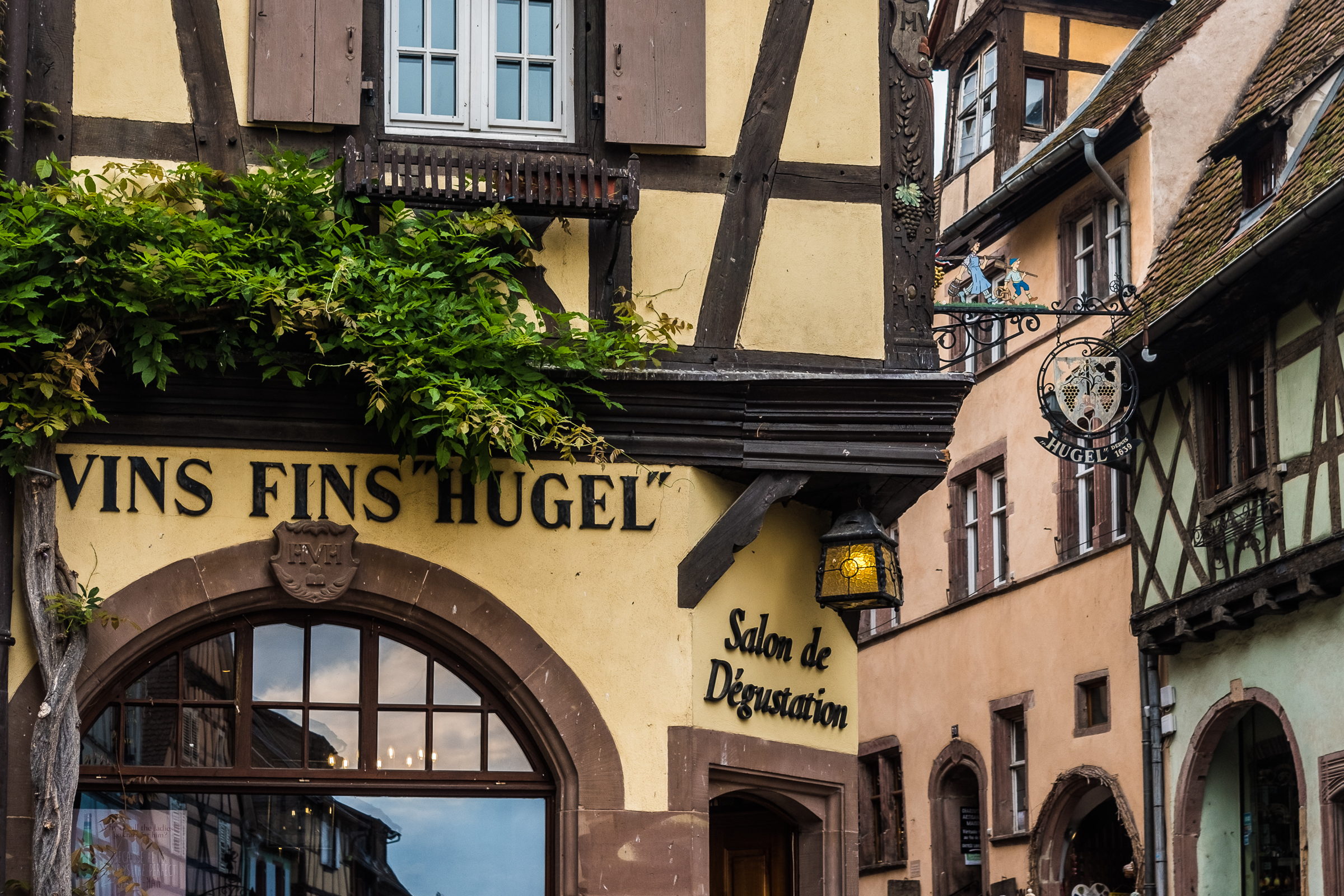
Shop Hugel et Fils in Riquewihr

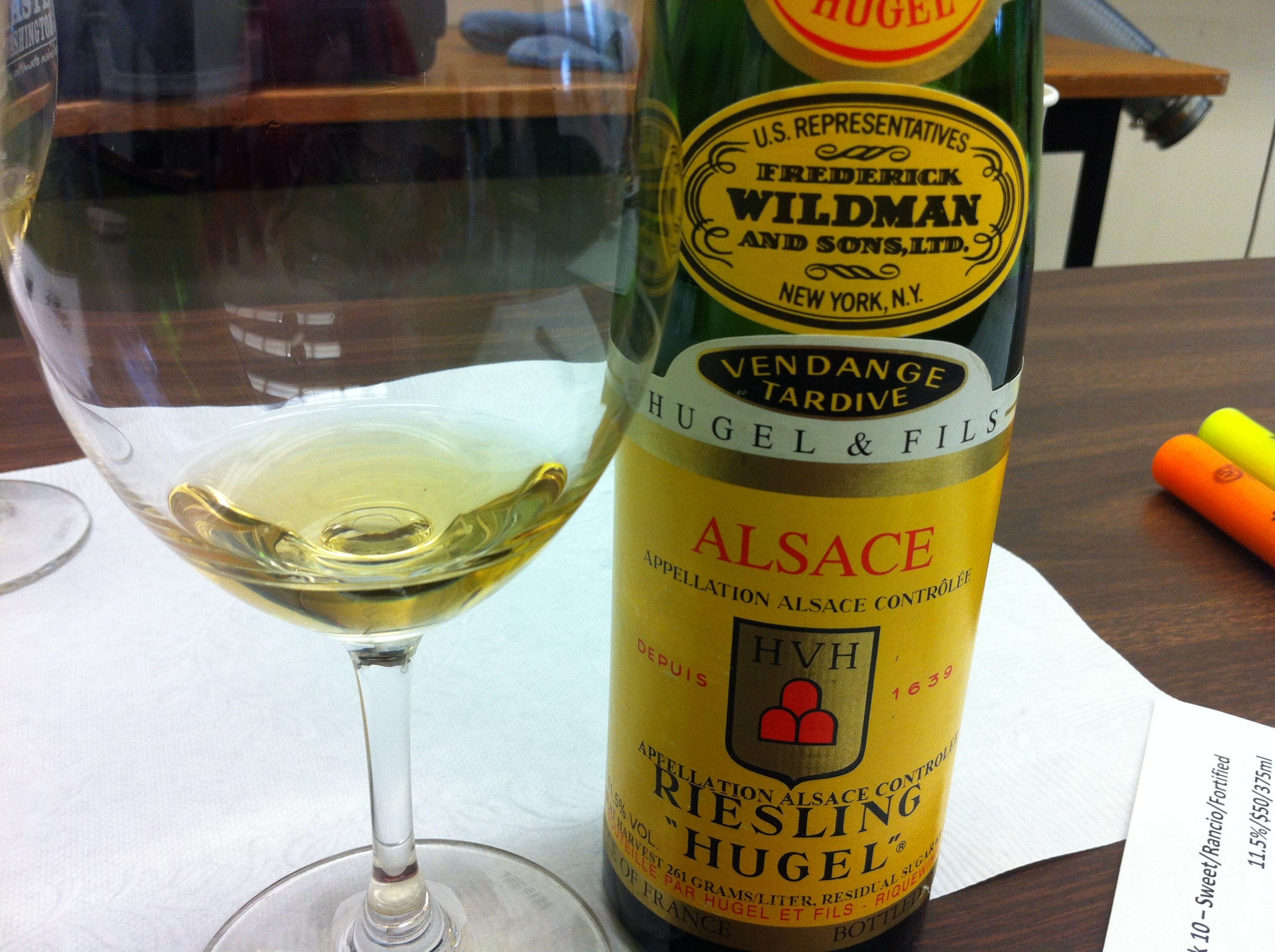
A Vendange Tardive made by Hugel.

The company was founded in Riquewihr in 1639 by Hans Ulrich Hugel, who was a Swiss national who left his home country during the Thirty Years' War. It has remained in the hands of the Hugel family since then. As a logotype, they use a family crest which was carved in 1672, to decorate the doorway of a house built in Riquewihr by one of Hans Ulrich's sons

In 1902, Hugel & Fils, which was then managed by Frédéric Emile Hugel, moved to its present location in the centre of Riquewihr.

In the second half of the 20th century, Jean Hugel played a leading role in Hugel & Fils as well as in the Alsace wine industry in general. Jean Hugel and Hugel & Fils pioneered the reintroduction of late harvest wines in Alsace. The 1984 wine regulations setting down the requirements for Vendange Tardive and Sélection de Grains Nobles wines is usually referred to as "Hugel's Law". Wines in this style were also produced by Hugel before these designations had been invented, and some earlier versions were marketed using designations from the German wine classification, such as Beerenauslese.

== Vineyard holdings ==
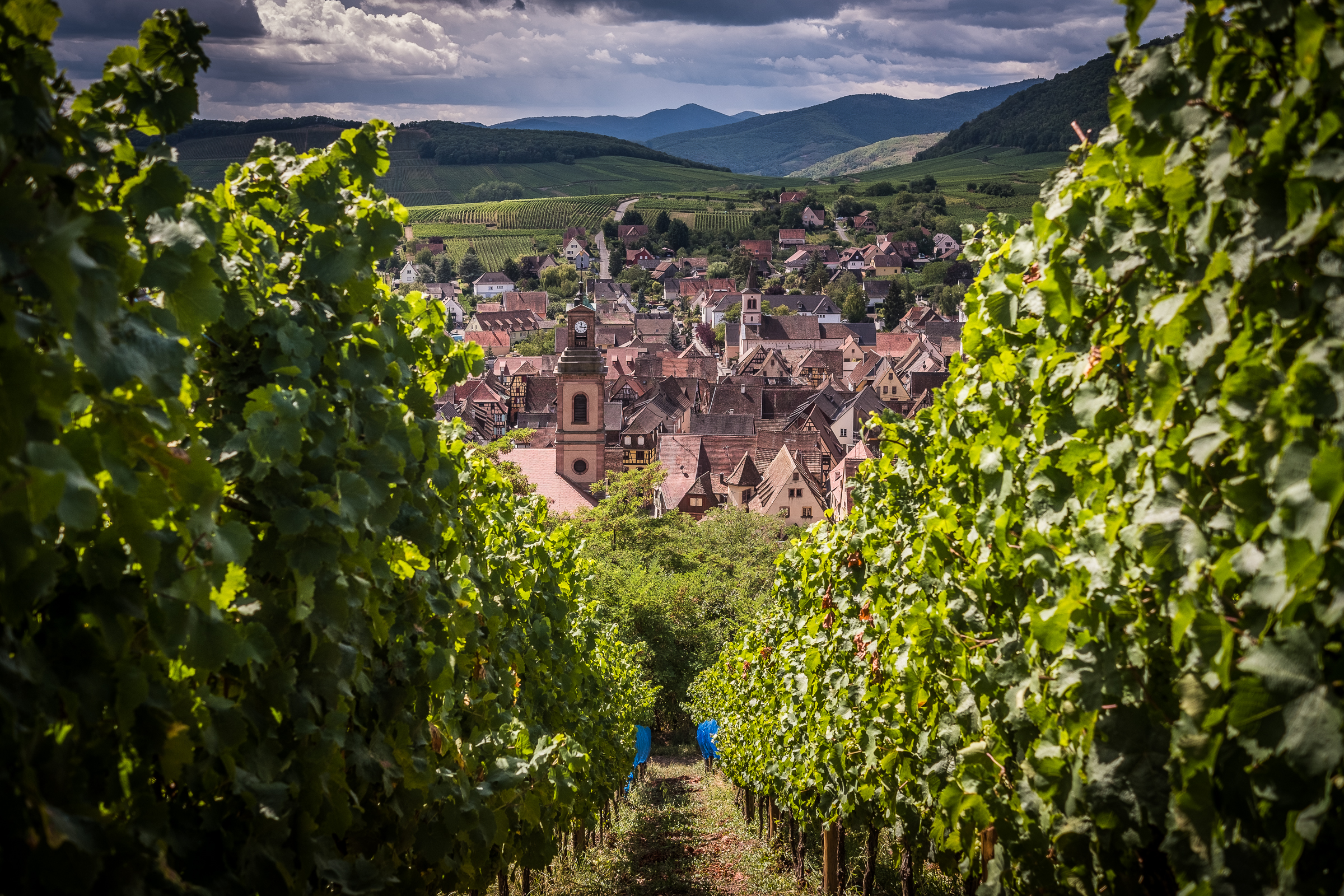
In the foreground the Schoenenbourg vineyard above Riquewihr, where Hugel's top Riesling is grown

Hugel & Fils hold slightly over 25 hectares (62 acres), all located around Riquewihr and almost half in vineyards allowed the Alsace Grand Cru designation. In addition, grapes from over 100 hectares (250 acres) of Alsace vineyards are bought in for the négociant business.

For the top wines, Riesling is grown in the Schoenenbourg vineyard, Gewürztraminer in Sporen, and Pinot gris and Pinot noir in Pflostig.

== Wines ==
Hugel & Fils does not use the Alsace Grand Cru designation for any of their wines, although most of their top wines come from Grand Cru vineyards. Instead, Hugel uses its own quality designations. Although Hugel was a pioneer in sweet Alsace wines, only wines clearly marked as late harvest wines or special cuvées have noticeable residual sugar; the wines of the regular range are always dry. For wines at the Tradition level and above, Hugel typically releases the wines when they are judged to be ready for sale. Thus, at a given time, different vintages may be in distribution for wines of different grape varieties, and the sweet wines are often sold with several years of bottle age.

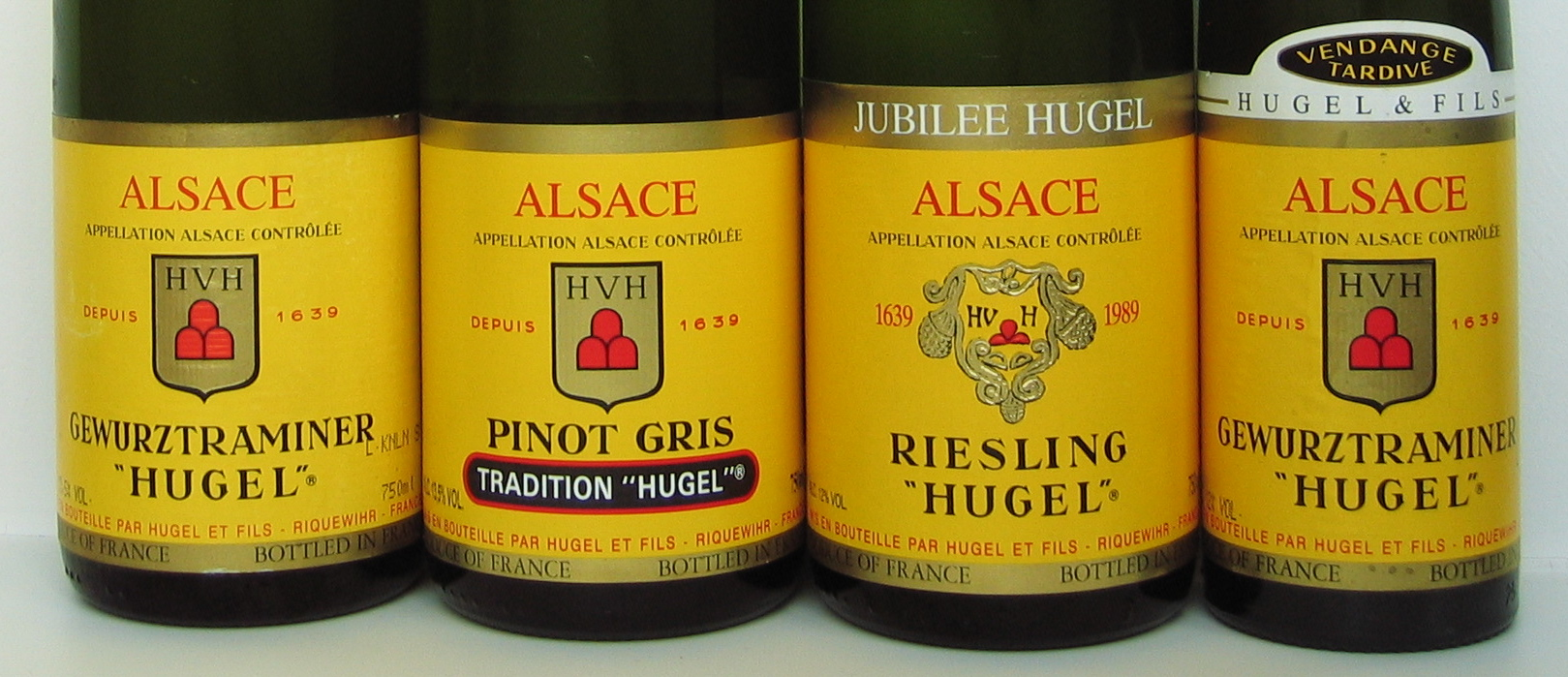
The labels of all Hugel wines feature a similar yellow design, but with some differences between the various quality levels – from left a Hugel Classic, a Hugel Tradition, a Hugel Jubilee, and a Vendange Tardive

Hugel's range of wines consist of the following levels:

- Dry wines
  - Hugel Classic - basic level wines produced from bought grapes. Includes most Alsace varieties and some blends.
  - Hugel Tradition - intermediate level wines, from the four "noble" white grapes.
  - Hugel Jubilée - top level dry wines from Hugel's own vineyards.
- Wines with residual sugar
  - Hommage Jean Hugel - semi-sweet wines with less concentration and sweetness than the Vendange Tardive range. This range was introduced with the 1997 vintage to commemorate the companies 50th vintage under Jean Hugel. This level has been used sparingly.
  - Vendange Tardive - late harvest wines.
  - Sélection de Grains Nobles - wines from botrytised grapes.
