= Grand cru (food and drink) =

Unofficial designation of food and drink quality

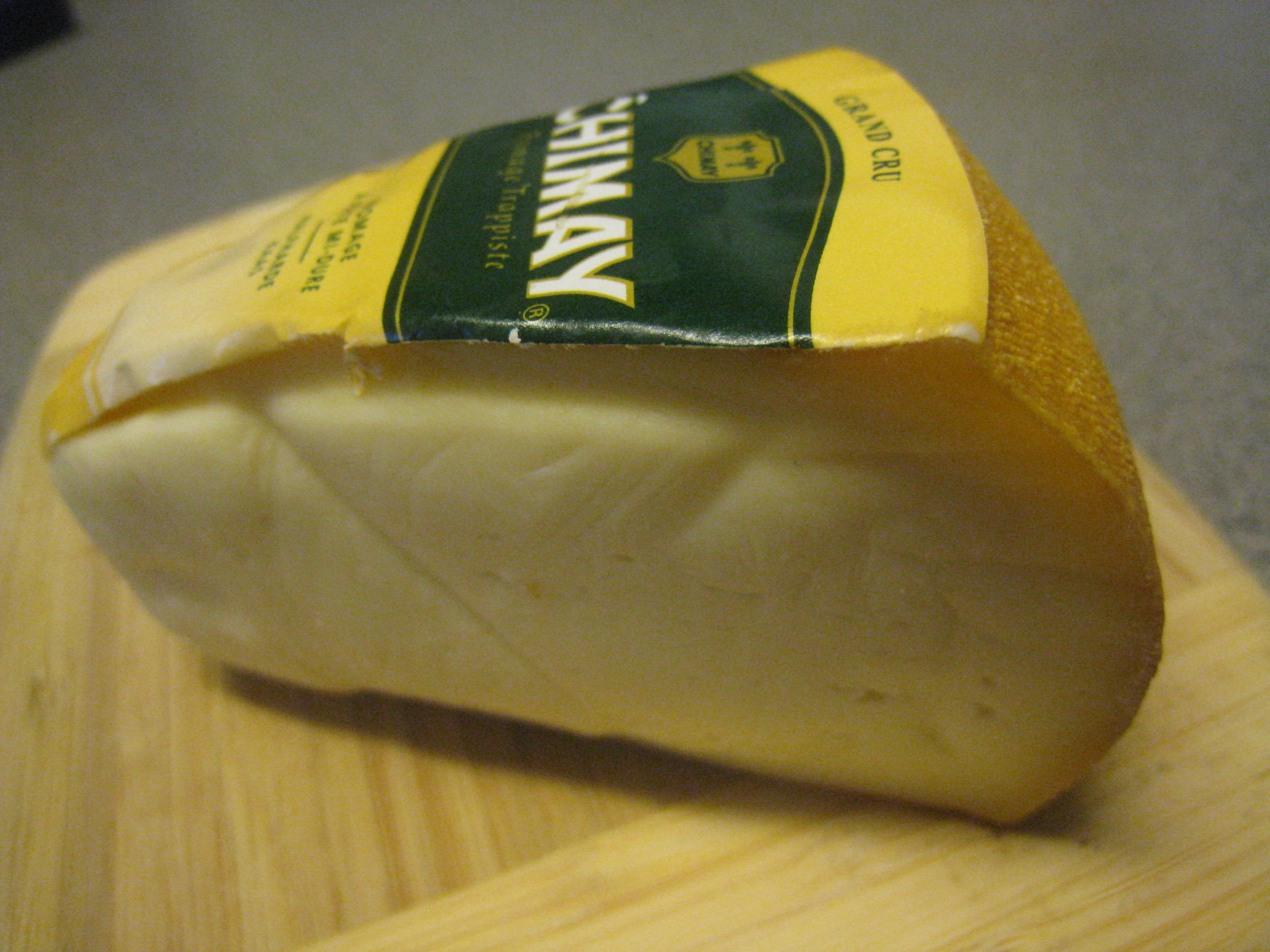
The Trappist Chimay Brewery's Grand Cru cheese

The term grand cru is used in a non-official context in the names of some products, particularly beer, chocolate, whiskey and cognac, to denote a high-quality product. While the term grand cru is well defined with respect to vineyards, its use with respect to other products is unregulated.

== Chocolate ==
In the 1980s, French chocolatiers responded to rising global competition by creating a new marketing message aiming to promote the "genuineness" of French chocolate. Some of the terms they used in this marketing included "vintage" and "grand cru". The grand cru designation signifies that the beans in a bar all come from a certain country or region.

Since the introduction of the grand cru, a new classification has arisen, that of the premier cru, which designates that the cocoa in a bar is sourced from a specific area, such as a plantation, within a country or region. A premier cru chocolate is typically considered to be of higher quality than a grand cru. This contrasts with the corresponding use of the terms in the wine market, where a grand cru wine is esteemed more highly than a premier cru.

== Beer ==
This term has been used for beers, especially in Belgium, to indicate a more elaborate version of a brand. InBev produces a more complex version of Hoegaarden called Hoegaarden Grand Cru, while the Rodenbach Brewery produces a Rodenbach Grand Cru. Lindemans Brewery make a gueuze and a kriek beer under the name Cuvée René Grand Cru.

Many breweries in the United States have also begun producing beers labeled "Grand Cru" to denote a limited production of a special or higher quality beer.

== See also ==
- Alsace Grand Cru AOC
- Cru (wine)
- Cru Bourgeois
- Kasteel Cru
- List of Burgundy Grand Crus
- List of Chablis crus
- Regional wine classification
- Route des Grands Crus
- Schoenenbourg (grand cru)
- Trou du Cru
