= Altenberg de Bergbieten =

French white wine produced in Alsace

Alsace Grand Cru Altenberg-de-Bergbieten, or Altenberg de Bergbieten, is a French white wine produced in the Altenberg lieu-dit (notable location), located in the commune of Bergbieten, in the Bas-Rhin department, in Alsace.

It is one of the fifty-one Grands Crus of the Alsace vineyard, each benefiting from its own appellation but sharing the same Alsace Grand Cru specifications. In the case of the Bergbieten cru, the name of the commune is mentioned after the name of the lieu-dit to differentiate this cru from the two other Altenbergs: Altenberg de Bergheim and Altenberg de Wolxheim.

== History ==
Altenberg de Bergbieten is mentioned as early as 1050 in the archives relating to Pope Leo IX. It belonged to religious congregations and to the bishopric of Strasbourg before being sold in 1789 to winegrowers and other individuals as part of the confiscation of church property by the nation.

In 1983, Altenberg de Bergbieten was one of the twenty-four localities selected as members of the Alsace Grand Cru appellation.

There have been some changes since then: the decree of 1 March 1984 regulates the us of the terms vendanges tardives and sélection de grains nobles within the appellation; and the decree of 24 January 2001 reduces yields and allows local wine syndicates to modify the specifications of each appellation following consultation.

== Etymology ==
The word Altenberg comes from the German Alten, an inflected form of the word meaning "old", and Berg meaning "height". One can therefore translate Altenberg loosely as "old hill".

== Geographical location ==
Altenberg de Bergbieten is produced in France, in the Alsace region, more precisely in the Bas-Rhin department, in the commune of Bergbieten which lies 23 kilometers west of Strasbourg, just north of Molsheim.

On the Alsace Wine Route, the Altenberg de Bergbieten is located almost at the northern end, between Steinklotz to the north and Engelberg further east. It is 29.07 hectares in size.

The site is somewhat unique - while sheltered by the Vosges mountains, as well as by the Scharrachberg to the east. It has low rainfall and gentle air circulation.

== Geology ==
Altenberg de Bergbieten is produced on marl soil (clay is dominant). Like all the grands crus of Alsace, it is located in the area of the sub-Vosges hills. This area corresponds to a series of faults forming the transition between the crystalline Vosges and the sedimentary Rhine plain, in the form of an escarpment. The Altenberg corresponds to a basin dating from the Upper Triassic, called by German geologists the Keuper.

The top of the hillside, near the summit of the Krummberg, dates from the Upper Keuper (i.e. the Rhaetian and Upper Norian); it consists of iridescent marls composed of variegated (grey-beige, green, mauve and wine-red) dolomitic clays. The lower layer is a narrow band of red marls with gypsum (known as Chanville clay) only two to five metres thick, from the same period. Just below, especially at the western end of the Altenberg, the vines are on layers of the Middle Keuper (i.e. the Carnian and Lower Norian). First there is massive or brecciated dolomite (called dolomite-rubbery or Beaumont dolomite) beige, then variegated marls (grey, red, white and green clays) and finally reed (containing imprints and plant debris, horsetails and ferns) greenish micaceous (from the middle Carnian).

The rest of the Altenberg, i.e. the majority of the production area, is on terrains of the lower Keuper (corresponding to the Ladinian): first there is greenish dolomitic clays (called marls with estheria), then variegated clays (grey, purple, red and green) with very fine quartz nodules and finally variegated marls with pseudomorphoses of salt. This type of subsoil would correspond to a salty lagoon in an arid climate, hence the deposits of evaporites (gypsum and anhydrite).

== Climate ==
The appellation shares features with Alsace in general, namely the protection from wind and rain provided by the Vosges mountains. The winds lose their humidity as they pass eastward over the hills, with dry and warm Foehn wind passing over the vignoble, leading to very low rainfall.

The nearest meteorological station to Kintzheim is the Entzheim station. Values between 1961 and 1990 are as follows:

Climate data for Strasbourg-Entzheim
Month	Jan	Feb	Mar	Apr	May	Jun	Jul	Aug	Sep	Oct	Nov	Dec	Year
Mean daily maximum °C	3.5	5.8	10.4	14.6	19	22.2	24.7	24.2	20.8	14.7	8.2	4.5	14.4
Daily mean °C	0.9	2.5	6	9.6	13.8	17	19.1	18.6	15.5	10.6	5.2	1.9	19.1
Mean daily minimum °C	−1.7	−0.9	1.6	4.6	8.6	11.7	13.4	13.1	10.3	6.5	2.1	−0.7	5.7
Average precipitation mm	33.1	34.3	36.6	48	74.5	74.6	56.8	67.8	55.5	43	46.6	39.9	610.5
Mean daily maximum °F	38.3	42.4	50.7	58.3	66	72.0	76.5	75.6	69.4	58.5	46.8	40.1	57.9
Daily mean °F	33.6	36.5	43	49.3	56.8	63	66.4	65.5	59.9	51.1	41.4	35.4	66.4
Mean daily minimum °F	28.9	30.4	34.9	40.3	47.5	53.1	56.1	55.6	50.5	43.7	35.8	30.7	42.3
Average precipitation inches	1.30	1.35	1.44	1.9	2.93	2.94	2.24	2.67	2.19	1.7	1.83	1.57	24.04
Mean monthly sunshine hours	42	78	122	161	197	212	240	215	168	101	58	43	1,637

== Climate change ==
The consequences of climate change are clearly visible in the Bas-Rhin with a significant decrease in frost days and snow days per year.

Since the very cold winter of 2012 in the department, mild winters have followed one another. The winter of 2019/2020 was exceptionally poor in snow with only one episode of snowfall recorded at the end of winter (February 27, 2020) in Strasbourg.

However, the winter of 2020/2021 broke the trend with 19 days of snow in Strasbourg. The department also experienced a record cold snap in February 2021. −13.4 °C in Strasbourg, −14.9 °C in Haguenau, −15.6 °C in Dambach and up to −16 °C in Erckartswiller on February 11, 2021. Such low temperatures had not been experienced since the cold snap of 2012. In addition, the department also experienced a historic snowfall on January 14 and 15, 2021 with 22 cm at Strasbourg airport and up to 25 cm in the Woerth/Morsbronn-les-Bains area.

== Popular culture ==
The vineyard is referenced in the Manga 'Drops of God' no. 35, where the Alsace restaurant l'Amsbourg is said to offer a 2009 Pinot Gris Altenberg de Bergbieten from Roland Schmitt. It is said to evoke a "mellow, refreshing forest".
