= QGN =

QGN can refer to:

- The airport code for Reus Airport in Spain
- Quintessence de Grains Nobles, a rare style of sweet French wine which is a more intense version of a Sélection de Grains Nobles
