= Jean Hugel =

Alsatian wine producer

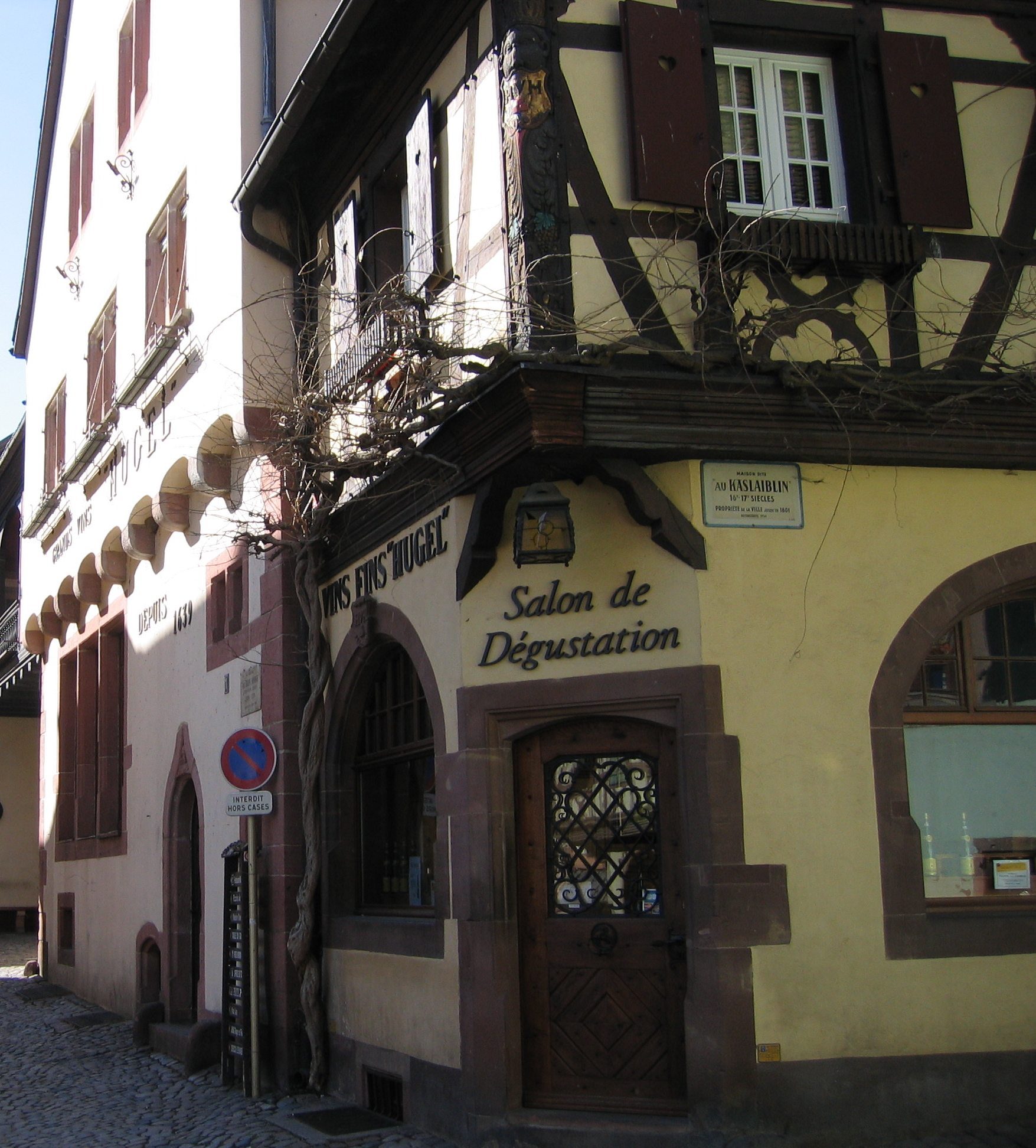
Hugel & Fils in central Riquewihr

Jean "Johnny" Frederic Hugel ( September 28, 1924 - June 9, 2009) was an Alsatian wine producer, described by wine expert Tom Stevenson as "the single most important person in the development of Alsace wine industry throughout the 20th century."

== Biography ==
Born in the village of Riquewihr, Jean Hugel began studying winemaking after World War II, attending the University of Bordeaux and University of Montpellier from the later of which he earned a master's degree in Agronomy. In 1948 he returned to the family estate in Alsace, Hugel & Fils, where he shared in management operations with his brothers André and Georges. In 1997, Hugel scaled back on his activities in the day-to-day management of the estate as his nephews took on more prominent role. He died of cancer in 2009.

== Influence on Alsatian wine industry ==
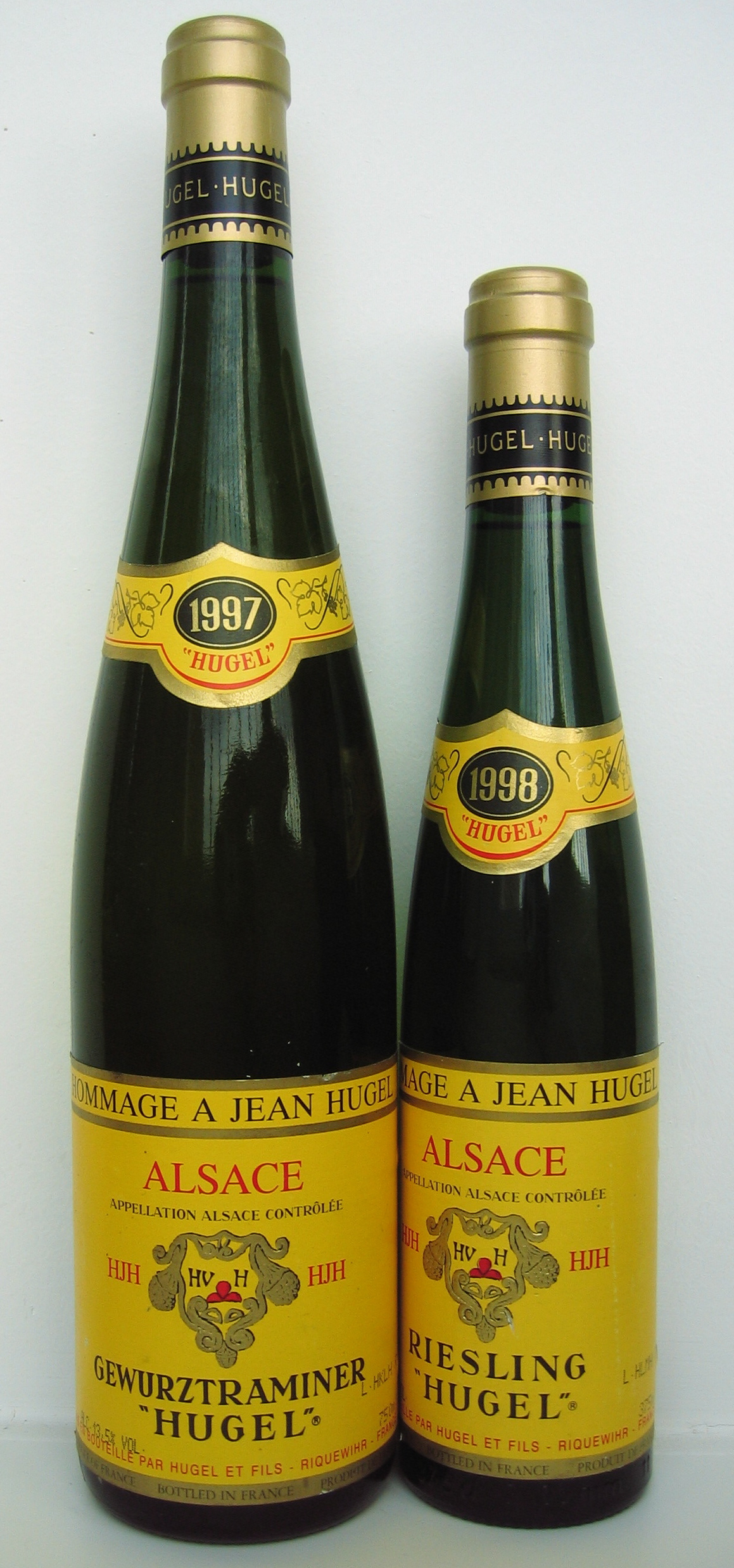
Two Hommage a Jean Hugel wines, a range which was introduced by Hugel & Fils in connection with Jean Hugel's 50th consecutive vintage in the family business.

Jean Hugel was very active in the drafting of the Appellation d'origine contrôlée guidelines for the Alsace AOC and Alsace Grand Cru AOCs. As founder and president of the Alsace Grand Cru commission, Hugel was a major influence in defining the boundaries the Alsace Grand Cru vineyards. Hugel also developed the guidelines for the late harvest dessert wines Vendanges Tardives and Sélections de Grains Nobles. When these laws were officially recognized in 1984 they were among the strictest AOC requirements in the French wine industry.

== Awards and honors ==
Over his more than 60 years in the Alsatian wine industry, Jean Hugel won numerous awards and honors. These include:

- Membership of the Académie du Vin de France
- Winner of the Catherine de Medici Prize for services to Oenology
- Grand-Maître of the Confrérie Saint-Étienne d'Alsace
- President of the International Wine & Spirit Competition
- Awarded the Mérite Agricole for services to and successful promotion French wines
- Awarded the Ordre du Mérite by the French Government for service to the French People

== See also ==
- List of wine personalities
