= Max Felchlin =

Swiss manufacturer of confectionery and baking ingredients

Max Felchlin AG
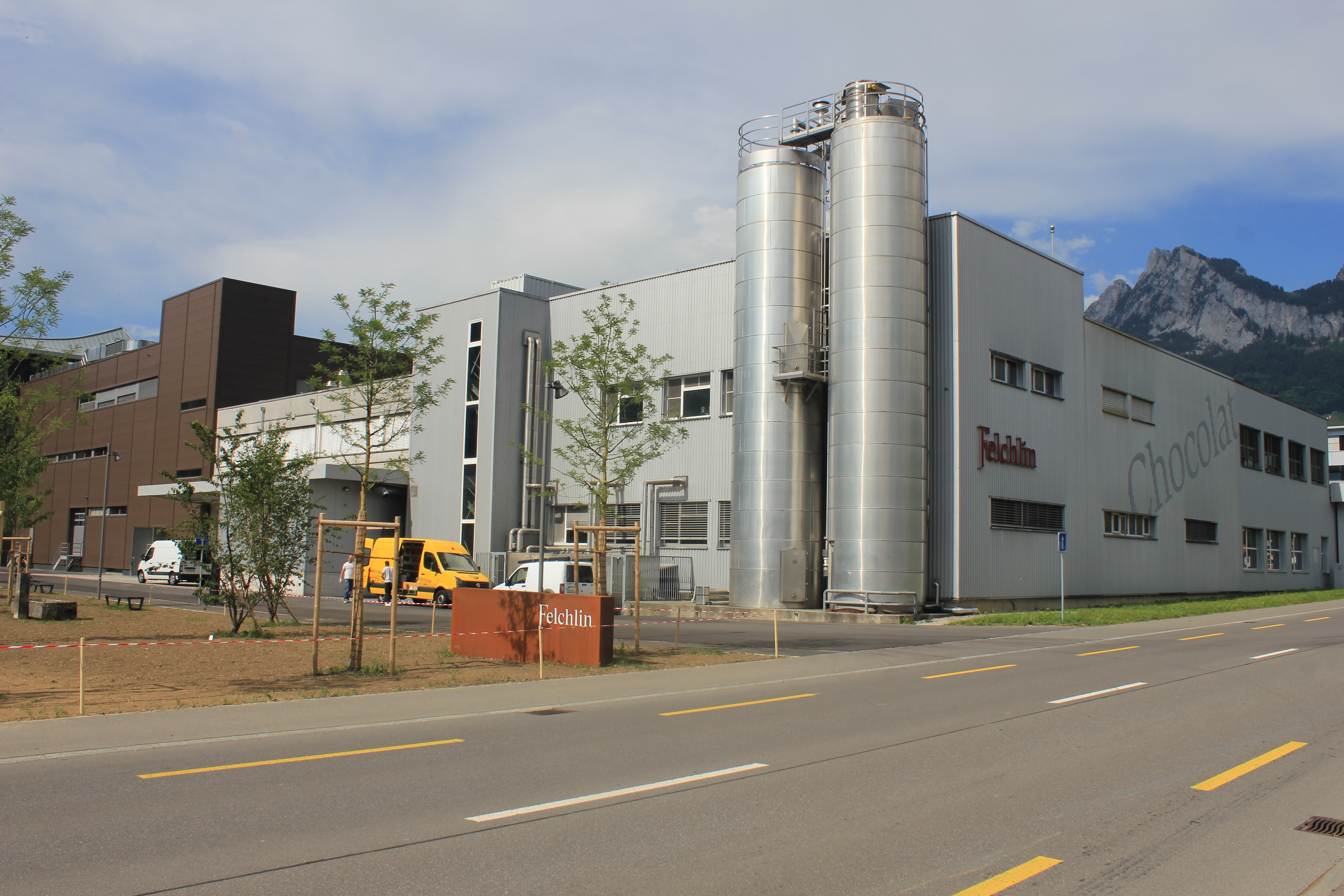
- Felchlin factory in Ibach
- Type: Aktiengesellschaft
- Industry: Confectionery
- Founded: 1908; 118 years ago
- Founder: Max Josef Felchlin
- Headquarters: Schwyz (canton of Schwyz), Switzerland
- Key people: Thomas Truttmann (CEO)
- Products: Chocolate, baking ingredients, confectionery ingredients
- Number of employees: 150
- Website: felchlin.com

Max Felchlin AG is a company headquartered in Schwyz, Switzerland which produces chocolate and other baking and confectionery ingredients.

== Company ==
Max Felchlin AG manufactures semi-finished products and supplies trades such as confectioneries and bakeries. This includes producers, restaurants and confectioners in Switzerland and abroad. The largest customers abroad are the USA and Japan. The company is considered a niche producer in the field of fine chocolate and manufactures it entirely in its Schwyz plant.

In 2019, around 150 employees worked for the company. Max Felchlin AG delivers to over 40 countries worldwide through distribution partners. Max Felchlin AG is a member of IG Bio.

== History ==
Businessman Max Josef Felchlin opened a honey shop in Schwyz in 1908, and expanded to chocolate by the 1920s. In 1913 he renamed his business Honigzentrale Schwyz. In doing so, he laid the foundation for the company. In 1928, Felchlin relocated the business to a rural estate in Seewen, Schwyz, called Liebwylen, and continued to expand the product line to other confections and ingredients.

In 1937, Felchlin developed a new type of praline and nougat mixture, the ‘Pralinosa’, which is still being sold today. During World War II, Felchlin produced Sowiso, a milk powder.

Felchlin transferred control of the company to his son, Max Felchlin Jr., in 1962, and died in 1970, at the age of 87. In 1974, the company became a public limited corporation, the Max Felchlin AG, and established a new factory in Ibach, Schwyz, and the sole proprietorship was converted into a stock corporation. In 1980, the company exported their products to Japan and the USA for the first time.

In 1991, Felchlin, Jr. arranged for an association of local Schwyz residents to take majority ownership of the company after his death. The association named Christian Aschwanden as CEO, subsequent to the death of Felchlin in 1992. The company moved to a new factory in Ibach in 2000. Development, processing and administration were also combined at the site in a new building added later. By 2006, Felchlin produced 2,500 tons per year. On the occasion of the centenary in 2008, a book was published by gastronomy journalist Paul Imhof. In 2016, Jamie Oliver visited the Felchlin chocolate manufacture in Schwyz for series Jamie's Super Food on Channel 4.

In 2012, the company started construction for a new cacao roasting plant, which was finished in 2014. In the same year Felchlin acquired a new property next to their current facilities in Ibach and started planning and construction of new and centralised headquarters. In 2018, the entire company moved into the new building complex.

In September 2022, Felchlin announced that after 30 years Christian Aschwanden would step down from Group Management in 2023. Thomas Truttmann then took over the position from August 2023.

== Products and services ==
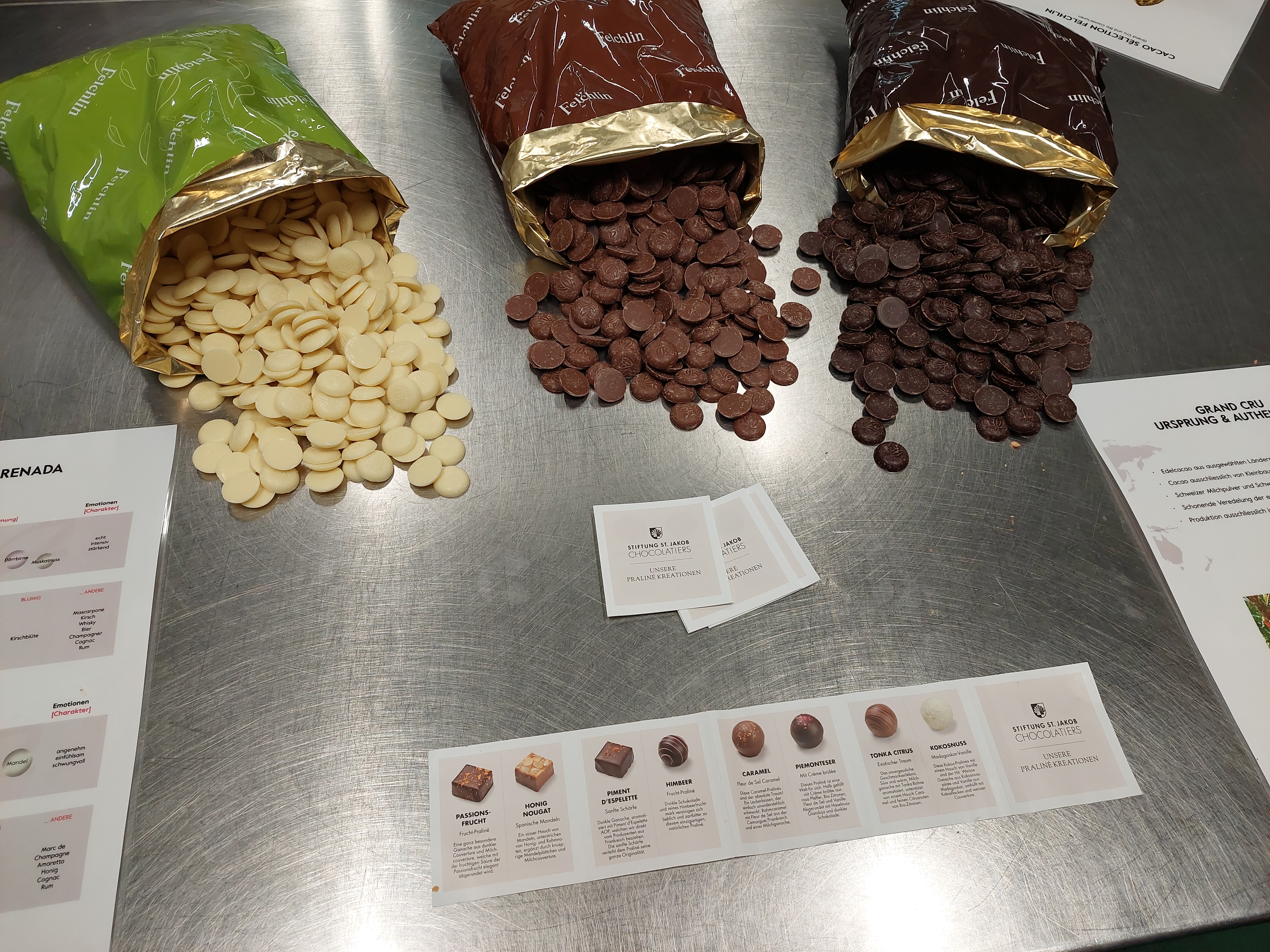
Couverture chocolate by Felchlin

Max Felchlin primarily sells wholesale to other confectioners, such as Sprüngli. The most prominent retail product is the Grand Cru line, introduced in 1999, which includes the Maracaibo Clasificado 65%. Felchlin proposes milk and white chocolates made exclusively with milk from the Entlebuch Biosphere, named "Grand Cru Opus Lait de Terroir".

Since 1988, the company has also offered on-site training for pastry chefs and other customers at its Condirama building in Schwyz.

Various fine chocolate manufacturers have their products produced by Felchlin. The company also supplies various confectioneries and confectioneries in Switzerland. In addition, Felchlin also offers training courses, seminars, recipe creations and technical support for business customers.

In 1999, the company was the first Swiss chocolate manufacturer to introduce the term "Grand Cru" for a selection of their couvertures (high-quality chocolate that is processed further). This means that only fine cocoa from a defined origin is used for these couvertures. Felchin processes beans from regions where the fine cocoa Criollo and Trinitario grows. These varieties are lower yield than the forastero beans processed by much of the cocoa industry, but are said to be more flavorful. To do this, Felchlin's chief buyer regularly travels to the regions of origin and buys the cocoa directly there. Max Felchlin AG is therefore taking on a pioneering role in the chocolate industry when it comes to sustainability. This peculiarity has been documented several times in the media.

== Awards and recognitions ==
A chocolate from the company's Grand Cru line, the Maracaibo Clasificado (65%), is named as the "World's Best Chocolate" by the Accademia Maestri Pasticceri Italiani in 2004.

== See also ==
- Swiss chocolate
- List of bean-to-bar chocolate manufacturers
