= Altenberg de Bergheim =

Type of French white wine

Alsace Grand Cru Altenberg de Bergheim, or Altenberg-de-Bergheim is a French white wine produced in the Altenberg lieu-dit, located in the commune of Bergheim, in the Haut-Rhin department, in Alsace.

On the Alsace Wine Route, Altenberg de Bergheim is located between Gloeckelberg to the north and Kanzlerberg just to the west (the latter also in the municipality of Bergheim, adjoining Altenberg).

It is one of the fifty-one grands crus of the Alsace region, each enjoying its own appellation but sharing the same Alsace Grand Cru specifications (with more stringent constraints than for the Alsace appellation in general). In the case of the Bergheim cru, the name of the commune is mentioned after the name of the lieu-dit to differentiate this cru from the two other Altenbergs: Altenberg de Bergbieten and Altenberg de Wolxheim.

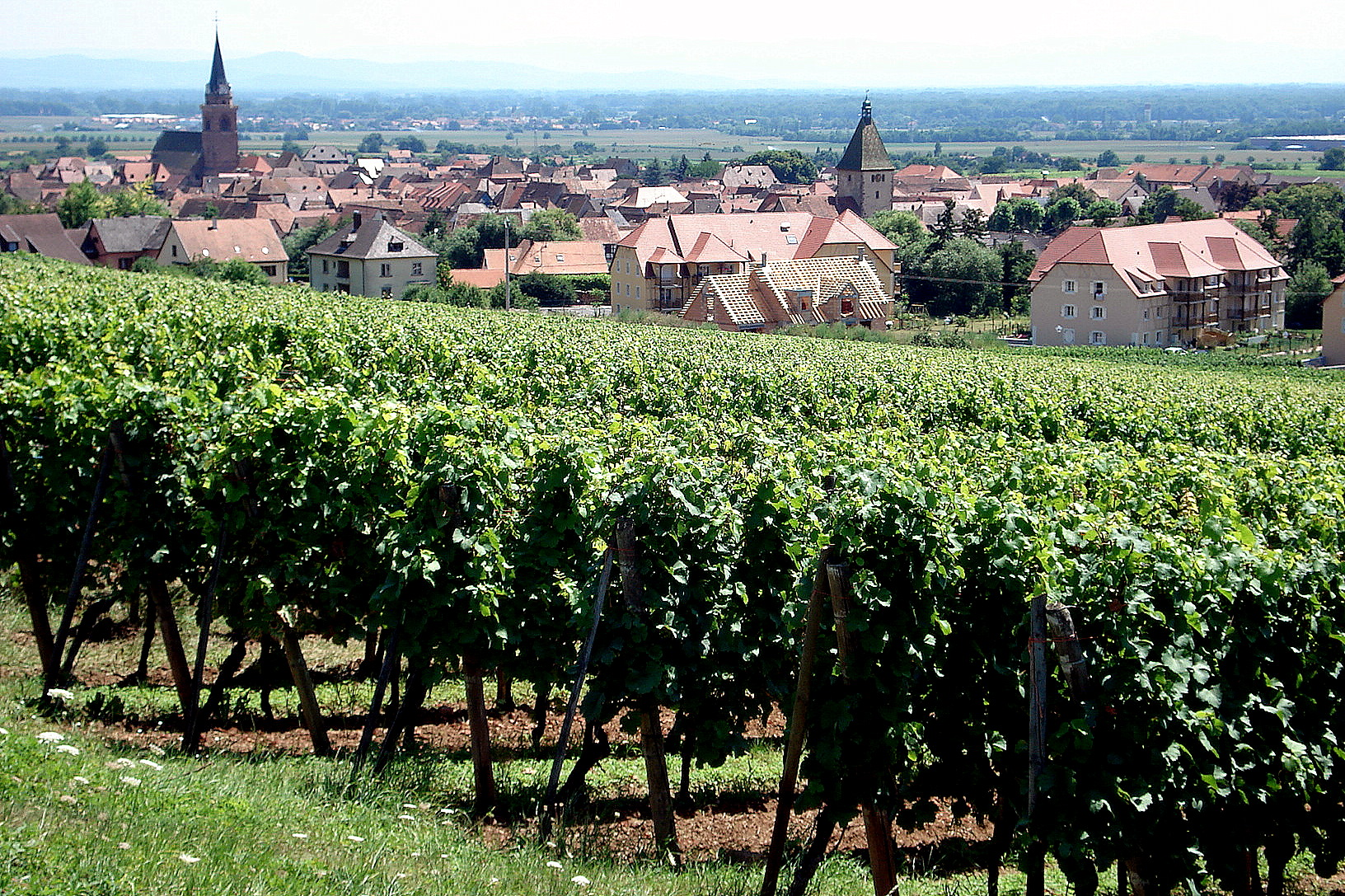
The village of Altenberg seen over vines.

== History ==
In 1983, Altenberg de Bergheim was one of the twenty-four lieux-dits selected to become the geographical names of the Alsace Grand Cru appellation.

There have been some changes since then: the decree of 1 March 1984 regulates the terms vendanges tardives and sélection de grains nobles within the appellation and the decree of 24 January 2001 reduces yields and gives the possibility of modifying the specifications of each denomination (each vintage) after consulting the local wine syndicate.

== Geology ==

This vineyard is significantly further south than the similarly named Altenberg de Bergbieten (see image). The vineyard is located in the Ribeauvillé fault area. It contains marl-limestone soil which is rich in fossils. The area is of Jurassic origin.

== Climatology ==
To the west, the Vosges protect the hillside from wind and rain. The prevailing westerly winds lose their moisture on the western slopes of the Vosges and reach Alsace in the form of foehn winds, dry and warm. Precipitation is therefore particularly low.

The vineyard plots are on the hillside, between 220 and 320 meters above sea level, on the south-facing slopes of Mount Grasberg, above and northwest of Bergheim. The planted area is 35.06 hectares.

== Climate ==
The nearest meteorological station to Kintzheim is the Entzheim station. Values between 1961 and 1990 are as follows:

Climate data for Strasbourg-Entzheim
Month	Jan	Feb	Mar	Apr	May	Jun	Jul	Aug	Sep	Oct	Nov	Dec	Year
Mean daily maximum °C	3.5	5.8	10.4	14.6	19	22.2	24.7	24.2	20.8	14.7	8.2	4.5	14.4
Daily mean °C	0.9	2.5	6	9.6	13.8	17	19.1	18.6	15.5	10.6	5.2	1.9	19.1
Mean daily minimum °C	−1.7	−0.9	1.6	4.6	8.6	11.7	13.4	13.1	10.3	6.5	2.1	−0.7	5.7
Average precipitation mm	33.1	34.3	36.6	48	74.5	74.6	56.8	67.8	55.5	43	46.6	39.9	610.5
Mean daily maximum °F	38.3	42.4	50.7	58.3	66	72.0	76.5	75.6	69.4	58.5	46.8	40.1	57.9
Daily mean °F	33.6	36.5	43	49.3	56.8	63	66.4	65.5	59.9	51.1	41.4	35.4	66.4
Mean daily minimum °F	28.9	30.4	34.9	40.3	47.5	53.1	56.1	55.6	50.5	43.7	35.8	30.7	42.3
Average precipitation inches	1.30	1.35	1.44	1.9	2.93	2.94	2.24	2.67	2.19	1.7	1.83	1.57	24.04
Mean monthly sunshine hours	42	78	122	161	197	212	240	215	168	101	58	43	1,637

== Yields ==
The yield limit for the entire Alsace Grand Cru appellation is set at 55 hectoliters per hectare, with a maximum yield of 66 hectoliters per hectare which is much lower than the 80 hectoliters authorized by the Alsace appellation. Bergheim winegrowers have set a stricter maximum yield since 1995, through a quality charter common to wo Bergheim crus (Altenberg and Kanzlerberg): 50 hectoliters per hectare.

The actual yield of the entire appellation (the 51 Alsatian crus) was 50 hectoliters per hectare on average for the year 2009. Although this is well below the average yields of the Alsace vineyard, it is a yield within the French average.

The grands crus of Alsace must be harvested by hand.

== Wines ==
=== Alcoholic strengths ===
The grapes harvested must have a minimum average natural alcoholic strength by volume of 12.5% for the Pinot Gris and Gewurztraminer grape varieties and 11% for Riesling and the Muscats. Wines from a blend have a minimum average natural alcoholic strength by volume of 12%.

== Blending ==
A particularity of the Alsace grand cru Altenberg de Bergheim appellation is the blending of part of the production, i.e. the mixing of several grape varieties within the same vintage, something rare in Alsace where the vast majority of wines are single-varietal. The only other appellations where this is allowed are Kaefferkopf and Zotzenberg (the latter allowing Sylvaner to be blended).

== Bottling ==
Alsace wines must be bottled only in flutes, i.e. bottles of the "Rhine wine" type of 75 centiliters, regulated by several decrees.
