= Altenberg de Wolxheim =

Alsace Grand Cru Altenberg de Wolxheim, or altenberg-de-wolxheim is a French white wine produced in the Altenberg lieu-dit, located in the commune of Wolxheim, in the Haut-Rhin department, in Alsace.

On the Alsace Wine Route, Altenberg de Wolxheim is located between Engelberg and Bruderthal. It lies near the northern tip of the Alsace region.

It is one of the fifty-one grands crus of the Alsace region, each enjoying its own appellation but sharing the same Alsace Grand Cru specifications (with more stringent constraints than for the Alsace appellation in general). In the case of the Bergheim crus, the name of the commune is mentioned after the name of the lieu-dit to differentiate this cru from the two other Altenbergs: Altenberg de Bergbieten and Altenberg de Bergheim.

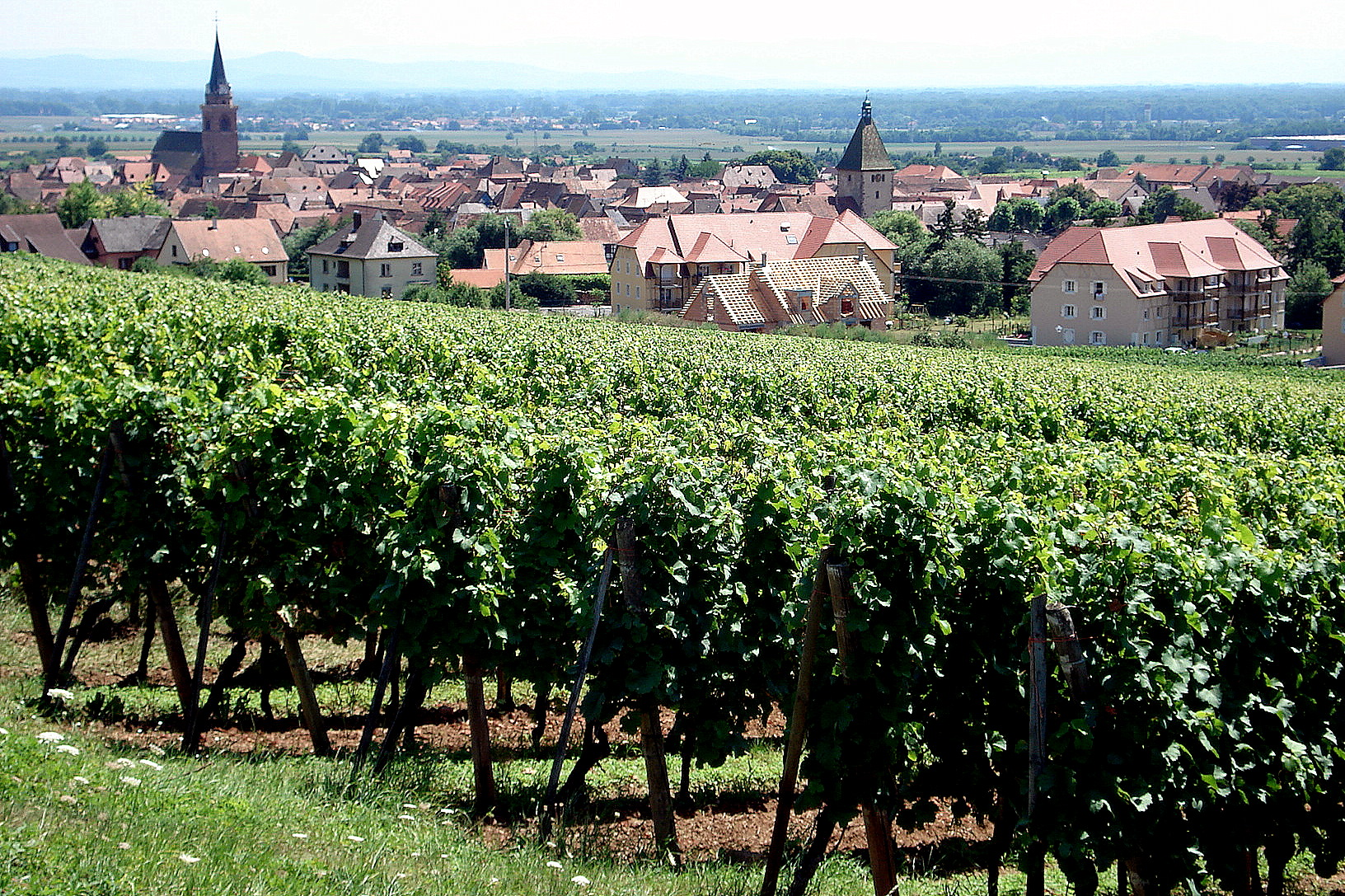
The village of Altenberg seen over vines.

== History ==
In 1983, the Alsace Grand Cru appellation was created, but Altenberg de Wolxheim was not amongst the vineyards originally included. It was only given Grand Cru status in 1992.

There have been some changes since the original 1983 creation: the decree of 1 March 1984 regulates the terms vendanges tardives and sélection de grains nobles within the appellation and the decree of 24 January 2001 reduces yields and gives the possibility of modifying the specifications of each denomination (each vintage) after consulting the local wine syndicate.

In October 2011, all the grands crus of Alsace went from the status of geographical denominations within the same appellation to that of separate appellations sharing the same specifications.

Altenberg de Wolxheim also received, in 2011, particular recognition amongst a select group of eleven vineyards with particular renown - in this case for its Riesling.

Interestingly a wine guide from 1886 writes that the vineyard is particularly noted for red wine, with white wine noted as an afterthought.

== Geology ==

The vineyard is made of stony marl-limestone.

== Climatology ==
To the west, the Vosges protect the hillside from wind and rain. The prevailing westerly winds lose their moisture on the western slopes of the Vosges and reach Alsace in the form of foehn winds, dry and warm. Precipitation is therefore particularly low.

As a result, the climate is much drier (Colmar is the driest station in France) and a little warmer (with an average annual temperature 1.5 °C higher) than would be expected at this latitude. The climate is continental and dry with warm springs, dry and sunny summers, long autumns and cold winters.

The vineyard plots are on the hillside, between 200 and 250 meters above sea level. The planted area is 31.20 hectares.

== Climate ==
The appellation shares features with Alsace in general, namely the protection from wind and rain provided by the Vosges mountains. The winds lose their humidity as they pass eastward over the hills, with dry and warm Foehn wind passing over the vignoble, leading to very low rainfall.

The nearest meteorological station to Kintzheim is the Entzheim station. Values between 1961 and 1990 are as follows:

Climate data for Strasbourg-Entzheim
Month	Jan	Feb	Mar	Apr	May	Jun	Jul	Aug	Sep	Oct	Nov	Dec	Year
Mean daily maximum °C	3.5	5.8	10.4	14.6	19	22.2	24.7	24.2	20.8	14.7	8.2	4.5	14.4
Daily mean °C	0.9	2.5	6	9.6	13.8	17	19.1	18.6	15.5	10.6	5.2	1.9	19.1
Mean daily minimum °C	−1.7	−0.9	1.6	4.6	8.6	11.7	13.4	13.1	10.3	6.5	2.1	−0.7	5.7
Average precipitation mm	33.1	34.3	36.6	48	74.5	74.6	56.8	67.8	55.5	43	46.6	39.9	610.5
Mean daily maximum °F	38.3	42.4	50.7	58.3	66	72.0	76.5	75.6	69.4	58.5	46.8	40.1	57.9
Daily mean °F	33.6	36.5	43	49.3	56.8	63	66.4	65.5	59.9	51.1	41.4	35.4	66.4
Mean daily minimum °F	28.9	30.4	34.9	40.3	47.5	53.1	56.1	55.6	50.5	43.7	35.8	30.7	42.3
Average precipitation inches	1.30	1.35	1.44	1.9	2.93	2.94	2.24	2.67	2.19	1.7	1.83	1.57	24.04
Mean monthly sunshine hours	42	78	122	161	197	212	240	215	168	101	58	43	1,637

== Grape varieties ==
Wines corresponding to the Appellation d'Origine Contrôlée Alsace Grand Cru followed by the geographical name (place name) Altenberg de Bergheim must be produced with the following grape varieties, either as a single variety or as a blend: Riesling, Pinot Gris, Gewurztraminer or one of the Muscats (Muscat Ottonel, Muscat Blanc à Petits Grains, or Muscat Rose à Petits Grains).

Gewurztraminer (meaning "aromatic traminer" in German) is the most cultivated grape variety on the Altenberg. It is a pink grape variety with orange or purple berries. This close relative of Savagnin and Savagnin Rose (called Klevener de Heiligenstein in Alsace) is rather vigorous, produces large yields and gives better results on marl or limestone soils than on granite or schist soils.

Riesling is not widely grown in Altenberg de Bergheim, but it is dominant in the blends (the grape variety limits mean between 50 and 70% of the surface area of the plots dedicated to the blends). It is a grape variety with late budburst and late ripening, requiring hillsides well exposed to the sun, whose harvests can take place around mid-October. On the other hand, it resists winter frosts well.

Pinot Gris (called Grauburgunder, "Gray Burgundian" in German, "Malvoisie" in Valais or Pinot Grigio in Italy) is a fragile grape variety and ripens quite early. It comes from a mutation of Pinot Noir and is therefore of Burgundian origin, where it is called "Pinot Beurot". It gives better results on soils composed of limestone gravel provided they are well drained thanks to a hillside exposure.

Muscats are rarely grown, either in the entire Alsace vineyard or in plots classified as Grands Crus. Muscat Blanc à Petits Grains, also called "Muscat d'Alsace", is originally from Greece; it has been grown in Alsace since at least the beginning of the 16th century. It is rather early. Muscat Ottonel is more recent, discovered in the 19th century in the Loire Valley before arriving in Alsace in the middle of the century. Ottonel is a hybrid of Chasselas, so it ripens even earlier than Muscat d'Alsace.

== Cultivation practices ==
The vines are trained high to protect them from frost, with the foliage espaliered; the height of the trellised foliage cannot be less than 0.675 times the spacing between the rows. The pruning of the vine must be done in single or double guyot with a maximum of ten buds per square meter of ground surface for the Gewurztraminer grape variety and eight buds per square meter of ground surface for the other grape varieties.

== Yields ==
The actual yield of the entire appellation (the 51 Alsatian crus) was 50 hectoliters per hectare on average for the year 2009. Although this is well below the average yields of the Alsace vineyard, it is a yield within the French average.

The grands crus of Alsace must be harvested by hand.

== Wines ==
=== Alcoholic strengths ===
The grapes harvested must have a minimum average natural alcoholic strength by volume of 12.5% for the Pinot Gris and Gewurztraminer grape varieties and 11% for Riesling and the Muscats. Wines from a blend have a minimum average natural alcoholic strength by volume of 12%.

== Bottling ==
Alsace wines must be bottled only in flutes, i.e. bottles of the "Rhine wine" type of 75 centiliters, regulated by several decrees.
