= French chocolate =

Chocolate produced in France

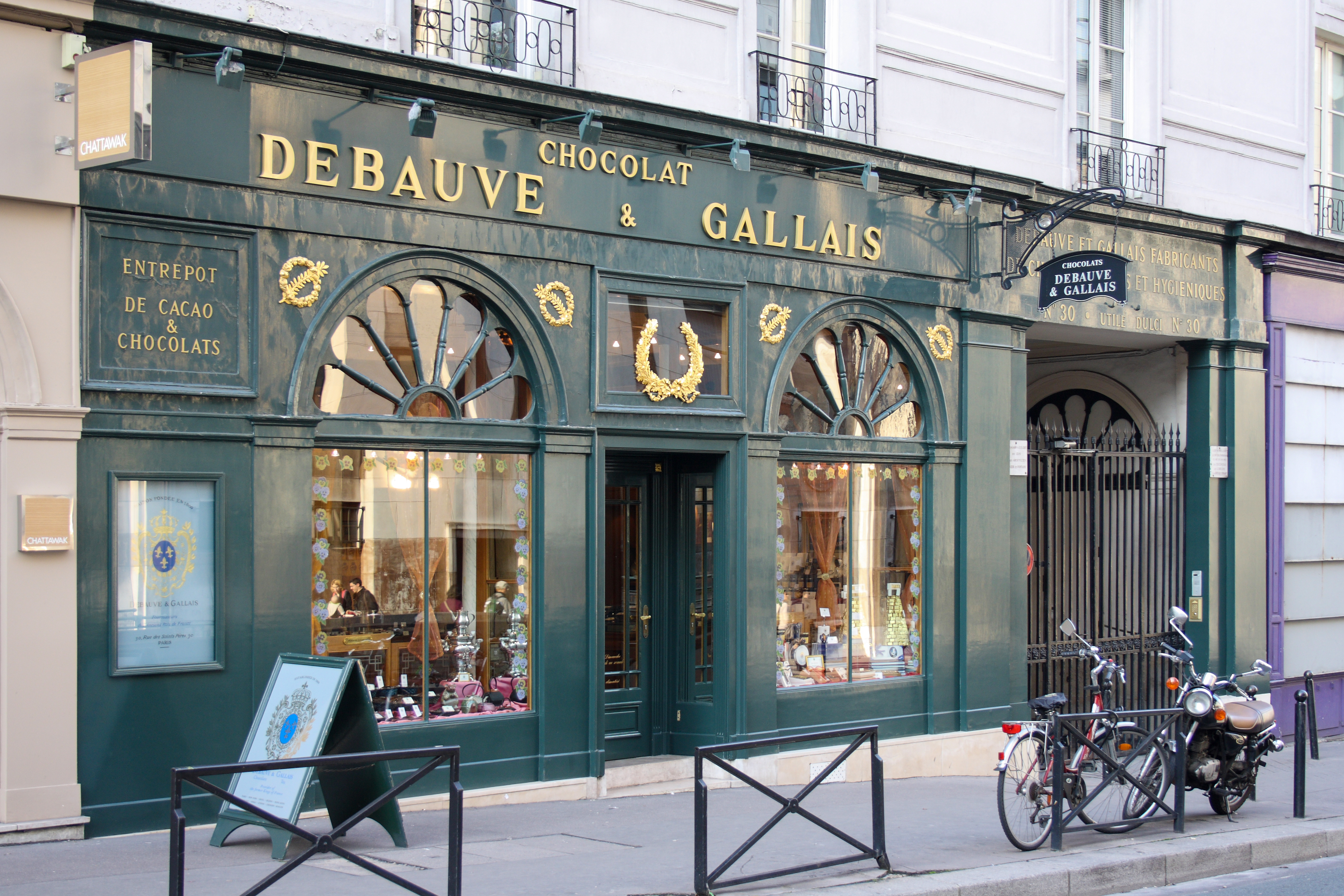
Debauve & Gallais shop in Paris

French chocolate is chocolate produced in France. France is considered the "home of dark chocolate", and French chocolate has a smooth texture and is characterised by its dark roast flavour.

== History ==
Anne of Austria, the daughter of the Spanish King Philip III, is often attributed as introducing chocolate to France in 1615 despite a lack of contemporary documentation. (Note: According to the account, Anne maintained her Spanish habit of drinking chocolate when she moved to France to marry Louis XIV.) Other figures that have been speculated to have introduced or popularised chocolate in France include Cardinal Richelieu, who used it as a medicine, and Marie Thérèse upon marrying Louis XIV in 1660. In 1643 chocolate was being written about in France as a "foreign drug". Chocolate gained popularity in elevated social circles around the 1650s and 1660s.

Production has historically been associated with the city of Bayonne. During the 18th century, the French emphasized cacao quality in making chocolate. Chocolate recipes commonly included vanilla, which was twice as common in French recipes for chocolate at this time than British recipes. During the 19th century, chocolate in French society was considered simultaneously a health food and being potentially dangerous. Chocolate gained importance in confectionery during the 19th century. The combined use of the mélangeur and roller mills allowed the production of a smooth chocolate, particularly suitable for eating. During the second half of the 19th century, France was the second largest consumer of chocolate behind only Spain. French assortments dominated the confectionery market until the appearance of milk chocolate in 1890s.

=== Late 20th century resurgence ===
As of 1988, French consumers generally ate milk chocolate from family businesses. What constituted a French taste in chocolate was unclear, and the French ate less chocolate than other Europeans. Chocolate was strongly associated with gift giving on specific seasons, social occasions and ceremonies. While aficionados maintained that dark chocolate was superior, among the public distinctions in chocolate were not made, and artisanal chocolatiers were not distinguished as a craft from pastry chefs. Foreign firms mass-producing chocolate emulated French merchandising and had captured 48% of the confectionery gift market by 1989. To receive advanced training, chocolatiers had to travel to Switzerland and Belgium. Parisian craft leaders and local chocolatiers appealed to officials for authenticating French artisans and their methods and products.

During the 1990s, chocolatiers institutionalized a craft identity, codifying a taste standard borrowed from wine connoisseurship, based on dark chocolate. Chocolate makers appropriated symbols from Aztec, local and national histories to create a French chocolate identity. In 1995, the Salon du Chocolat opened, attracting 40,000 visitors with exhibits of chocolate making and an haute fashion show. In 1998, the Académie française du Chocolat et de la Confiserie was formed to codify correct linguistic use.

By 2000, French chocolate was considered culturally authentic and gourmet in French society. A trend of consumers choosing chocolate for their high cocoa percentages and bean origins and varieties. By 2008, the French were among the highest consumers of chocolate. As of 2014, the Salon du Chocolat's fashion show was still being exhibited. The Festival of Gourmet Art also continued, which featured chocolate accessories and paintings. Chocolate makers and consumers were interested in sourcing high-quality, single-origin beans. Firms such as Valrhona moved to bean-to-bar production, cultivating relationships with small producers.

== Characteristics ==
French chocolate's flavour is a dark roast, with a smooth texture. The use of milk fat rather than chocolate crumb in French milk chocolate gives it a different flavour to chocolates manufactured in countries such as the United Kingdom.

== Industry ==
As of 2008, the Confederation of artisinal chocolate and sugar candy producers (Confédération des Chocolatiers et Confiseurs de France) was an industry group for chocolatiers in France. As of 2024, France levied a 5.5% VAT on dark chocolate and a 20% VAT on white chocolate.

=== Meilleur Ouvrier de France ===
In 1990, the Ministry of Education approved requests to organize the first Meilleur Ouvrier de France (Best Craftsman of France) competition in the chocolate and candy making category.

Chocolatier involvement in the Best Craftsman of France competition requires high time, social and financial investment for success. This has led to a consolidation of the industry in heirs of successful chocolatiers.

== Cultural heritage ==
As of 2014, chocolate was officially omitted as an element of French gastronomy.

== See also ==
- Grand cru (food and drink)

== Sources ==
=== Books ===
- Gordon, Bertram M. (2009). "Chocolate in France". In Grivetti, Louis Evan; Shapiro, Howard-Yana (eds.). Chocolate: History, Culture, and Heritage. New Jersey: John Wiley & Sons, Inc. ISBN 978-0-470-41131-5.
- Leissle, Kristy (2018). Cocoa. Polity. ISBN 9781509513208. OCLC 988580966.
- Mason, Laura (2014). "Bonbon". In Davidson, Alan; Jaine, Tom (eds.). The Oxford Companion to Food (3rd ed.). Oxford University Press. ISBN 9780199677337.
- Sampeck, Kathryn E (2019). "Chocolate and Vanilla: Seeds of Taste". Seeds: Proceedings of the Oxford Symposium on Food and Cookery 2018. Great Britain: Prospect Books. ISBN 978-1-909-248-65-6.
- Terrio, Susan (August 28, 2014). "French Chocolate as Intangible Cultural Heritage". In Brulotte, Ronda L; Di Giovine, Michael A (eds.). Edible Identities: Food As Cultural Heritage. New York: Routledge. ISBN 9781409442639.
- Wohlmuth, Edward G (2017). "Recipes". In Beckett, Stephen T; Fowler, Mark S; Ziegler, Gregory R (eds.). Beckett's Industrial Chocolate Manufacture and Use (5th ed.). West Sussex, UK: Wiley. ISBN 9781118780145.
- Ziegler, Gregory A; Beckett, Stephen T (2022). "Milk chocolate". In McSweeney, Paul LH; McNamara, John P (eds.). Encyclopedia of Dairy Sciences (3rd ed.). Elsevier. ISBN 978-0-12-818767-8.

=== Journal articles and reports ===
- Mathias, Manon (December 1, 2022). "Chocolate and the French novel: modernity, language, nature". Modern & Contemporary France. 31 (4): 529–544. doi:10.1080/09639489.2022.2134324.
- Comparative study on the distribution of value in European chocolate chains (Report). Paris: Food and Agriculture Organization of the United Nations (FAO) and Bureau d’analyse sociétale pour une information citoyenne (BASIC). 2024.
