= Marcel Deiss =

French wine grower and producer

Marcel Deiss is a French wine grower and producer. It is based in Bergheim, in the Alsace wine region of France.

== History ==
The Deiss family came to Bergheim in 1744 and took up grape growing in the area shortly afterward.

The current domaine was started in 1947 by Marcel Deiss after returning from the Second World War.

The estate is currently run by the grandson of the founder, Jean-Michel Deiss and his son Mathieu. Jean-Michel took over the estate in 1973 after graduating from an oenology course at university.

== Wines ==
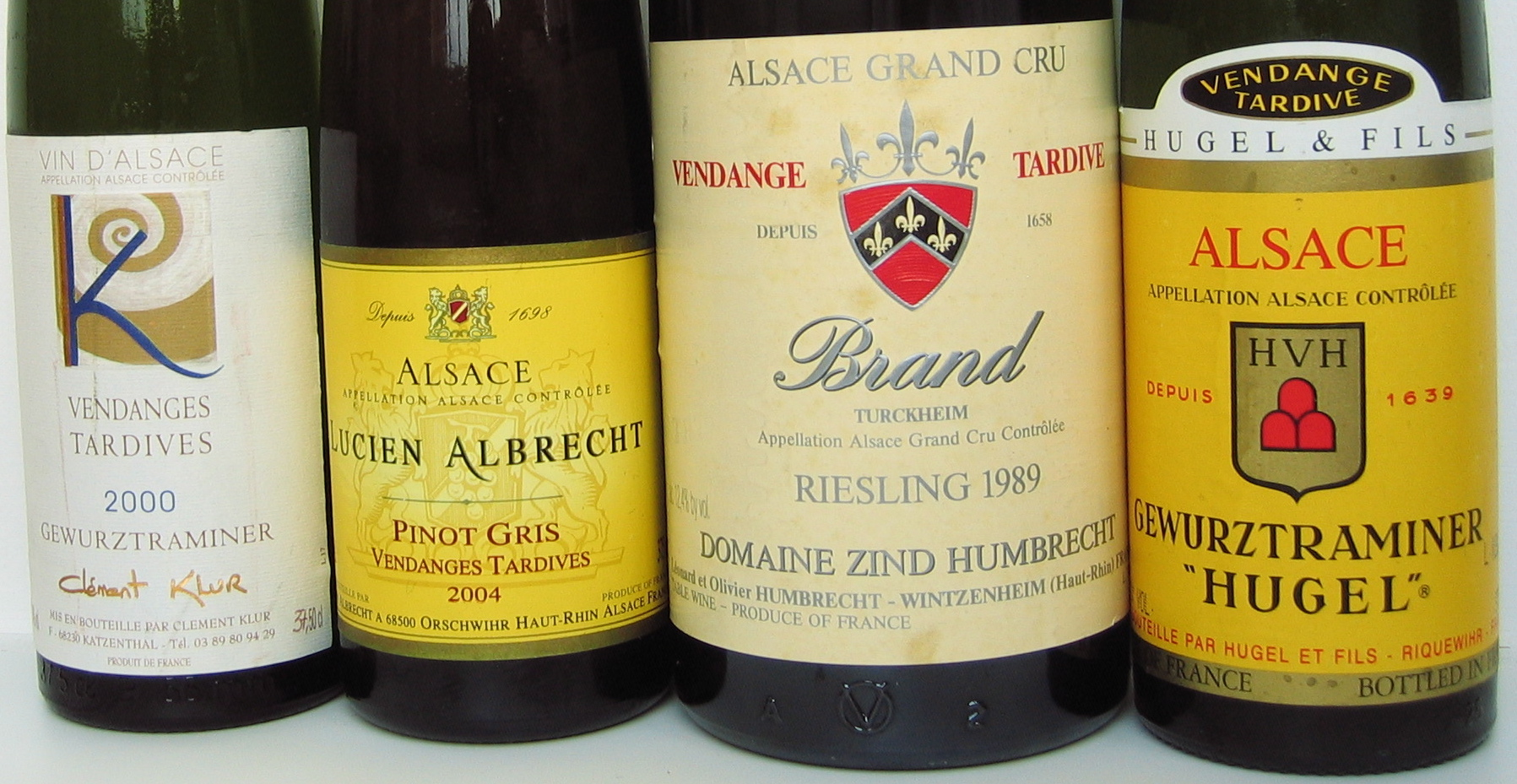
Alsace has a long history of varietally labeling their wines (Riesling, Gewürztraminer, Pinot gris, etc.). The practice was mandatory for all wines produced under the Alsace Grand Cru AOC wines until Marcel Deiss convinced the INAO to change the laws in 2005.

The domaine currently owns around 26 hectares of vineyards in nine different areas of Alsace, with around 10,000 cases of wine produced each vintage depending on conditions. The vineyards were maintained according to organic principles and have been converted to biodynamic methods since 1998.

It is in recent years that the reputation of the estate has grown significantly under the direction of Jean-Michel Deiss. The estate is best known for its field blends of Riesling, Pinot gris, Gewurztraminer and other grapes. While these blends are common in Alsace, Deiss is unusual in that it produces these wines from top vineyards, including Grand cru designated sites.

Deiss also differs from the traditional system in Alsace which usually includes listing the grape types used to produce the wine on the label, starting in 2000 the Vins de Terroirs labels only indicate the vineyard name. Not putting the grape type on the label of Grand crus was illegal until Deiss convinced the Institut National des Appellations d'Origine to change the law in 2005, against the wishes of many other prominent wine estates in Alsace.

Wines are made in three categories, by the estate: Vins de Fruits, Vins de Terroirs and Vins de Temps.

- Vins de Fruits: entry level wines from the estate, made from a single grape type.
- Vins de Temps: made to emphasise the character of the vintage, with the Vendange tardive and Selection de Grains Nobles designations.
- Vins de Terroirs: field blends that Deiss is known for, with multiple grape types from a single vineyard.
