= Kasteel Cru =

Lager brewed in Alsace, France

Kasteel Cru was a lager brewed in Alsace, France. Kasteel Cru Rose was also brewed in Alsace with a hint of elderflower & elderberry. Kasteel Cru Rose is a fine, crisp lager with a distinct rose-like colour and a clean, sparkling taste.

Kasteel Cru is brewed at Brasserie la Licorne(en: the unicorn brewery) in Saverne, Alsace, France, using malted barley, hops and pure Alsace water from the Vosges mountains; alcohol volume of 5.2%, and is 129 calories.

This light and zesty beer was first introduced in 2001. As Beer Advocate states, "One of the newest and most interesting styles of beer with much potential in the beer industry as a top-shelf crossover beer. Primarily brewed in Belgium, these beers typically undergo a lengthy maturation. Some are even cave-aged in France and are then subjected to remuage and dégorgement, which is the "methode de champenoise" process of removing yeast from the bottle. Most are delicate, high in alcohol, highly carbonated and sometimes spiced. Color can range from very pale to dark hues."

Kasteel Cru is the only beer in this style made entirely in France, even its bottle is produced by glass-moulders in Reims.

Other beers in this style are mostly ale style (except one other) and all are packaged in 750ml glass, corked and caged bottles, Kasteel Cru is unique because it is a lager, and packaged in a thick 330ml (11.2 oz) bottle with a crown cap and punt.

According to former US Brand Director, Scott Franklin, Kasteel Cru was discontinued in the US as of November 2009.

Distribution in the UK was discontinued in 2012.

Other beers in this style are: Deus, Malheur Brut Noir, Malheur Bière Brut (Brut Reserve) and Malheur.

The heavy carbonation in these delicate beers makes them extremely light tasting and refreshing.
