= Dopff au Moulin =

Family winery located in Riquewihr, France

- Industry: Winery
- Founded: 1574
- Headquarters: 2 av Jacques Preiss, 68340 Riquewihr, France
- Website: www.dopff-au-moulin.fr

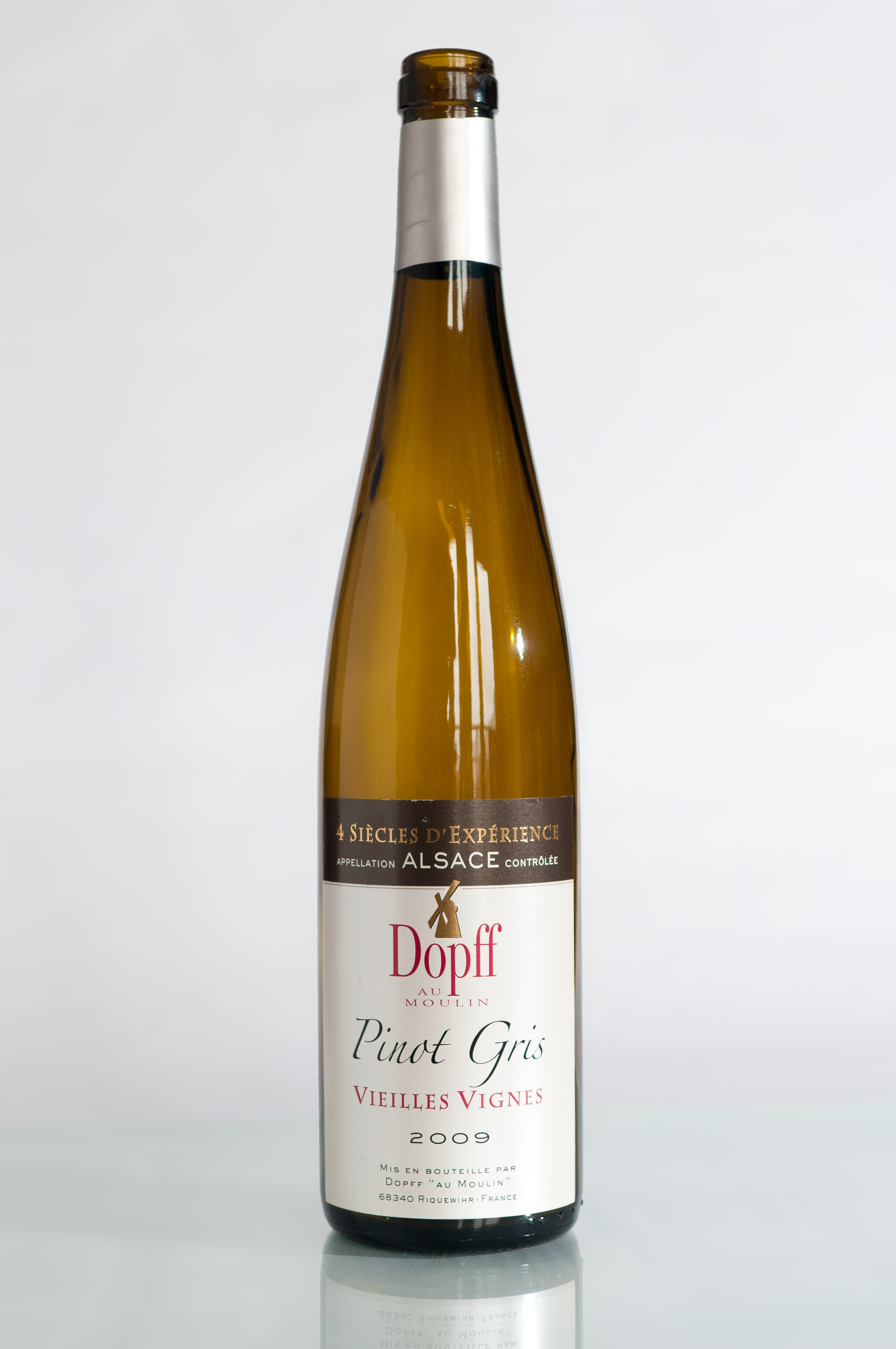
Dopff au Moulin wine

Dopff au Moulin is a family winery from 1574 growing grapes on over 70 hectares located in Riquewihr, France.

The main product is Crémant d'Alsace, a special sparkling wine of the Alsace wine region in France.

== See also ==
- List of oldest companies
