= Trou du Cru =

French cheese

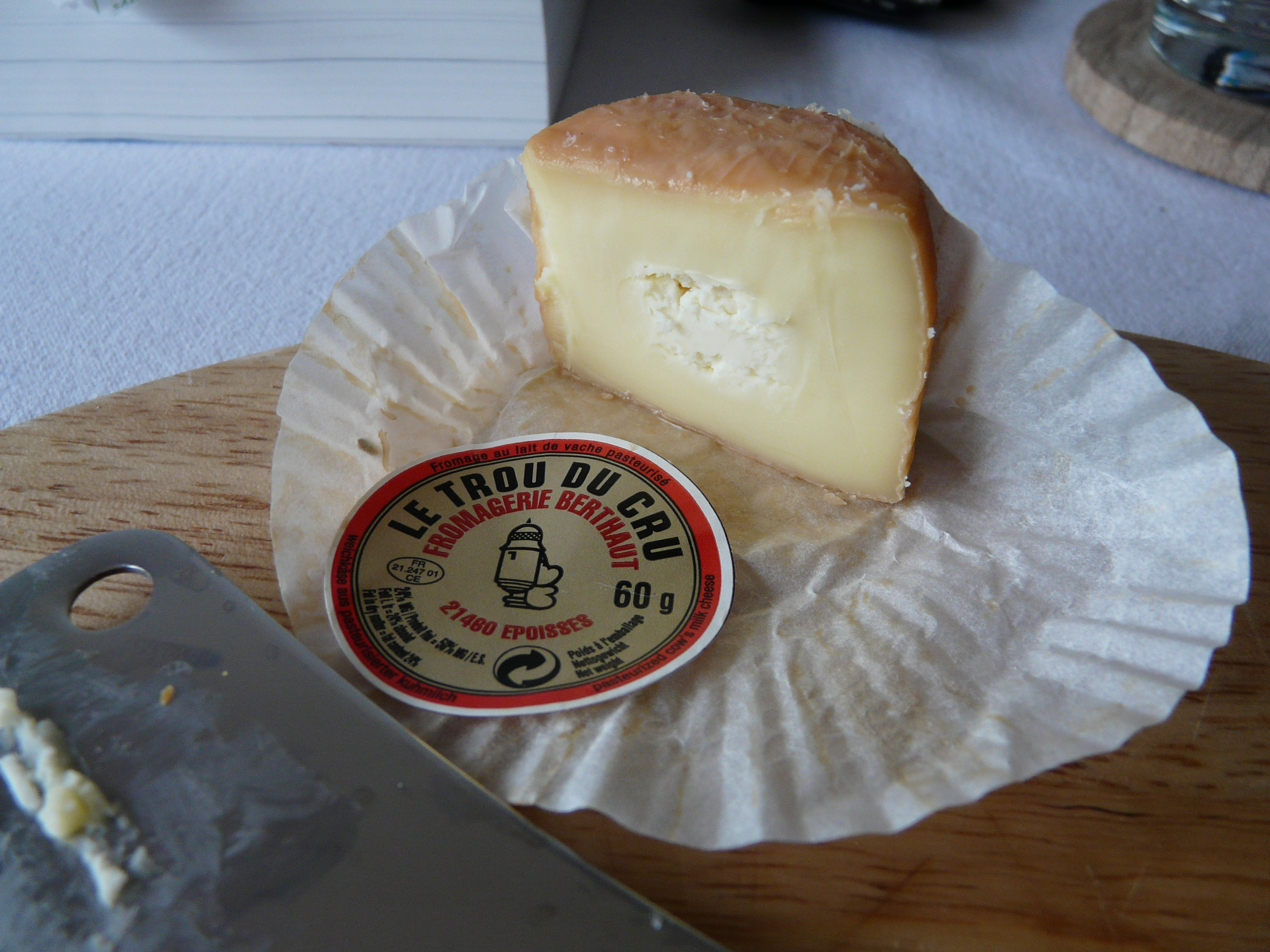
- Country of origin: France
- Region: Côte-d'Or, Burgundy
- Source of milk: Cow
- Pasteurized: Yes
- Texture: Soft
- Aging time: 5–9 weeks
- Certification: None

Trou du Cru (French pronunciation: [tʁu dy kʁy]) is a very strong, pungent French cheese, developed by the cheesemaker Robert Berthaut in the early 1980s. It is a pasteurized cow's milk Époisses cheese from the Burgundy region.

The soft cheese is ivory-yellow in color, with an orange, edible rind. For four weeks during its maturation, each small cheese is washed individually with Marc de Bourgogne, a strong local brandy, which imparts a straw-like flavor to the cheese.

Trou du Cru is molded in small (1.5 in, 60 g) rounds, packaged in paper cups; and in medium (4.5 in, 250 g) wheels, packaged in wooden containers.
