= Vendange tardive =

French dessert wine

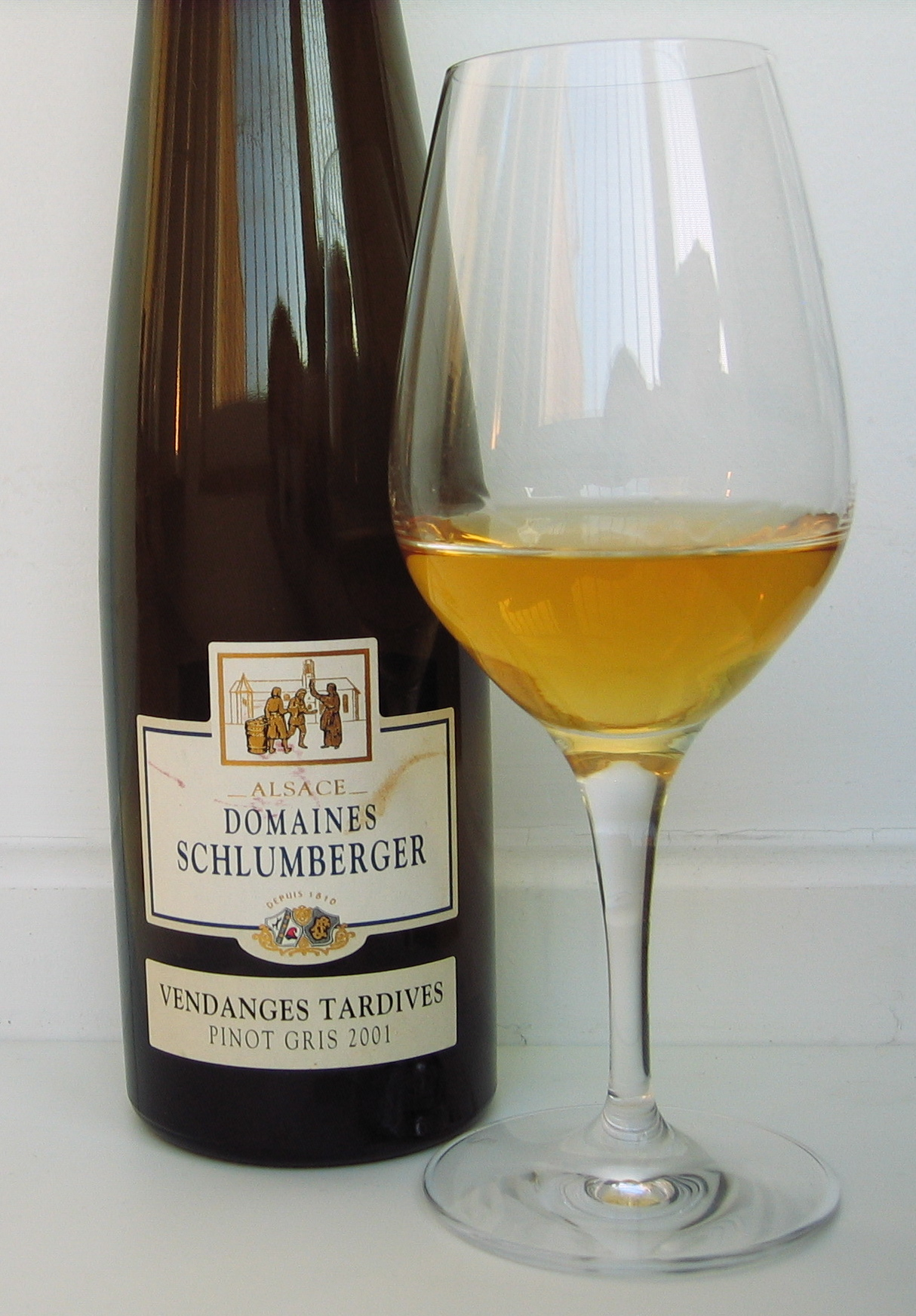
A Pinot gris Vendange Tardive from Alsace.

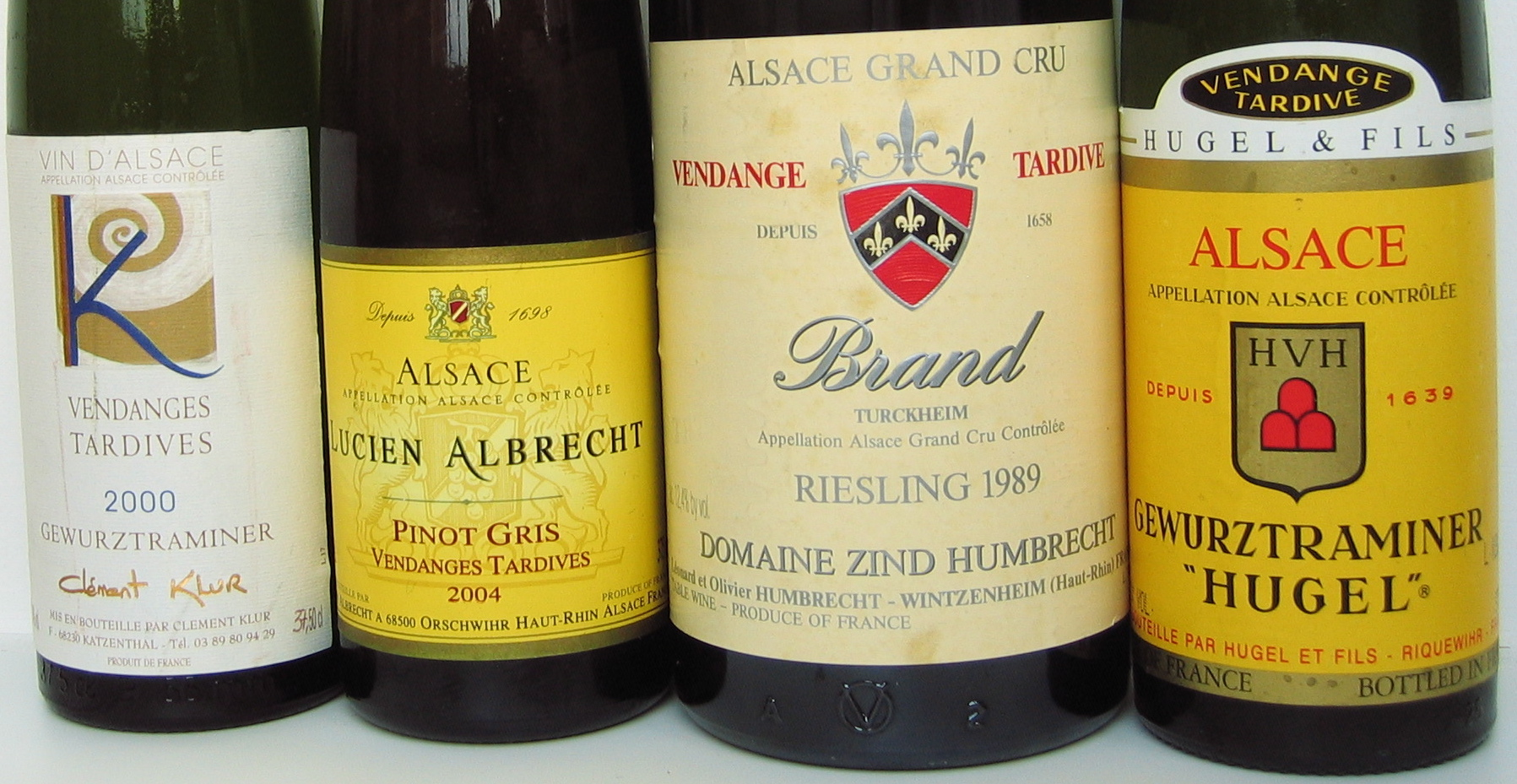
Four Vendange Tardive wines from different Alsace producers. Note that the two labels on the left use the plural form, Vendanges Tardives, while the two on the right use the singular form.

Vendange tardive ("VT") means "late harvest" in French. The phrase refers to a style of dessert wine where the grapes are allowed to hang on the vine until they start to dehydrate. This process, called passerillage, concentrates the sugars in the juice and changes the flavours within it. The name is sometimes written as the plural form, vendanges tardives, referring to the fact that several runs through the vineyard are often necessary to produce such wines. In other countries such as Germany or Austria the term Spätlese is used to describe wine using the same making process.

Alsace wines were the first to be described as vendange tardive but the term is now used in other regions of France. Since 1984, the term has been legally defined in Alsace and may only be applied to wines that exceed a minimum must weight and pass blind tasting by the INAO. Sélection de Grains Nobles ("SGN") is an even sweeter category, for grapes affected by noble rot. Vendange tardive is also an official wine designation in Luxembourg.

== Hugel's Law ==
The Alsatian wine producer Jean Hugel first described a wine as vendange tardive after the long hot summer of 1976. He drafted rules for vendange tardive wine that were eventually accepted by the INAO on 1 March 1984, and known unofficially as Hugel's Law in recognition of his crusade.

The minimum sugar levels were increased in 2001. The criteria are :

- A declaration to the INAO in advance of the intention to harvest late and the vineyards specified.
- A physical check of the grapes and of the quality of the juice.
- A minimum must weight equivalent to 15.3% potential alcohol for Gewurztraminer and Pinot gris, and 14% potential alcohol for Riesling and Muscat.
- For Sélection de Grains Nobles, the minimums are 18.2% and 16.4%, respectively.
- No chaptalisation nor acidification.
- The wine certified by INAO officials.
- The wine may not be released without a blind tasting by the INAO, at least 18 months after it is made.

Between 1981 and 1989, the number of producers rose from 11 to over 500.

== Styles ==
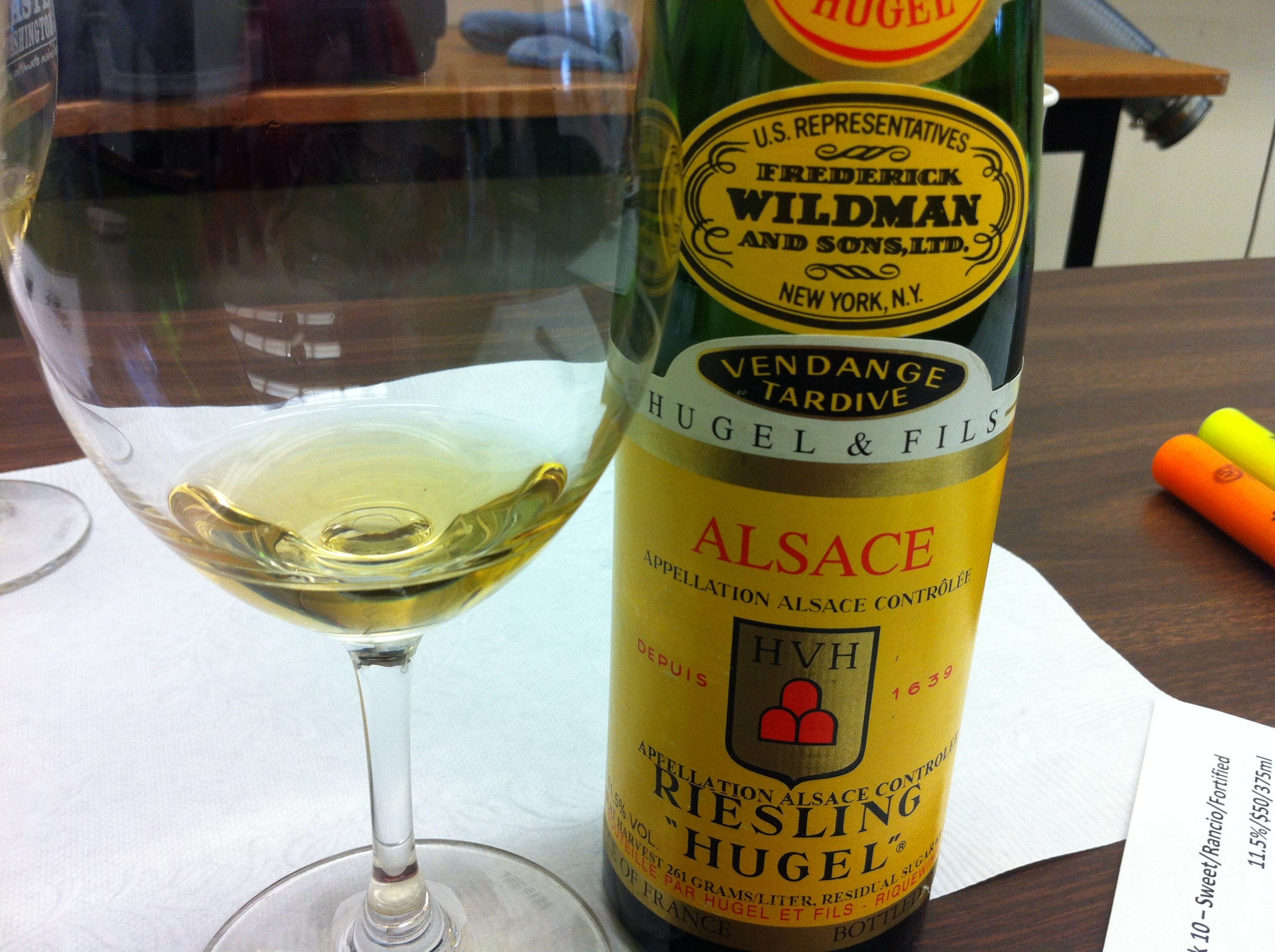
A Riesling made in the Vendange Tardive style.

The minimum sugar levels in the juice are a bit above those required for the German Auslese classification, but are routinely exceeded by good producers; on the other hand Alsace wines tend to be fermented more completely than those across the Rhine, reducing the amount of sugar in the final wine. Some vendange tardive wines are fairly dry, most are sweet but not cloyingly so; all are characterised by great richness. Sélection de Grains Nobles is roughly equivalent to the German Beerenauslese, with the honeyed flavours characteristic of noble rot.

Gewurztraminer is the most common variety used for vendange tardive wines, as it readily achieves high sugar levels; these are harder to attain with Riesling and Pinot gris, but with greater acidity to balance the sweetness, such wines can be very long-lived. Muscat vendange tardive wines are sometimes seen.

== Food matches ==
In Alsace, vendange tardive wines are drunk with foie gras or tarte Tatin.
