= Sélection de Grains Nobles =

Sélection de Grains Nobles (SGN) is French for "selection of noble berries" and refers to wines made from grapes affected by noble rot. SGN wines are sweet dessert wines with rich, concentrated flavours. Alsace wines were the first to be described as Sélection de Grains Nobles, with the legal definition introduced in 1984, but the term is also seen in some other wine regions France, such as Loire.

== Use in Alsace ==
For Alsace wines, SGN is the highest official category for late harvest wines, while the step below is called Vendange tardive.

In 2001, the minimum must weight requirements for SGN in Alsace were increased to 18.2% for Gewürztraminer and Pinot gris, and 16.4% for Riesling and Muscat, expressed as potential alcohol. Only these four "noble varieties" may carry the SGN designation, or the Vendange tardive designation.

The required level ripeness of the grapes are as follows, expressed as sugar content of the must and potential alcohol:

Varieties	SGN since 2001	SGN before 2001
Gewürztraminer; Pinot gris	306 grams per liter or 18.2% potential alcohol or 128 °Oe	16.4% potential alcohol or 117 °Oe
Riesling; Muscat	276 grams per liter or 16.4% potential alcohol or 117 °Oe	15.1% potential alcohol or 108 °Oe

These requirements make SGN roughly equivalent to a German Beerenauslese, but the Alsace style tend to favour slightly higher alcohol levels, which means that the residual sugar often is a little lower than in German wines, especially for Riesling and Muscat.

On rare occasions, the designation Quintessence de Grains Nobles (QGN) is seen for wines that significantly exceed the minimum requirements for SGN wines. Unlike the German designation Trockenbeerenauslese (TBA), QGN is no official designation, but it could be thought of as the Alsatian equivalent of a high-grade TBA. The term was invented in 1983 by Domaine Weinbach to describe an exceptional cuvee of that year's vintage, and while still used primarily by Weinbach, it has been adopted by a few other producers, including Marcel Deiss.

== Use in Loire ==
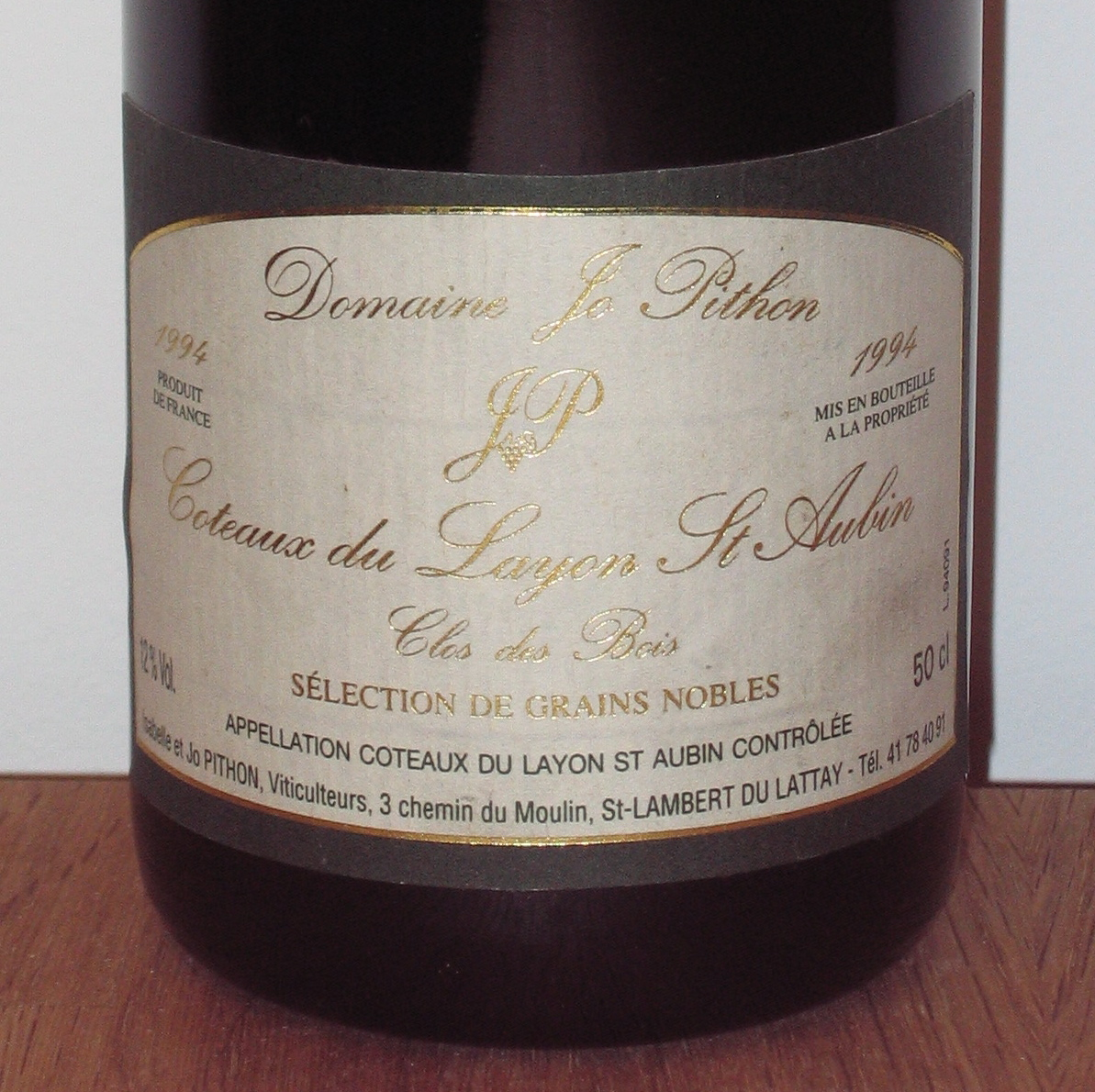
A wine from the Loire valley labelled Sélection de Grains Nobles.

In the case of Loire valley wines, the designation SGN usually denotes wines that are extra sweet, and produced by one of the region's so-called "sugar hunters". Often, the same producer will have another wine from the same appellation with less residual sugar without the SGN designation. The SGN designation can be used in the appellations Coteaux du Layon and Coteaux de l'Aubance and in both cases this requires the grape must used for the wine to have a minimum sugar content of 294 grams per liter rather than the basic level of 221 or 230 grams per liter respectively.

== See also ==
- Sweetness of wine
