= Achenheim =

Achenheim Àchene
- Commune
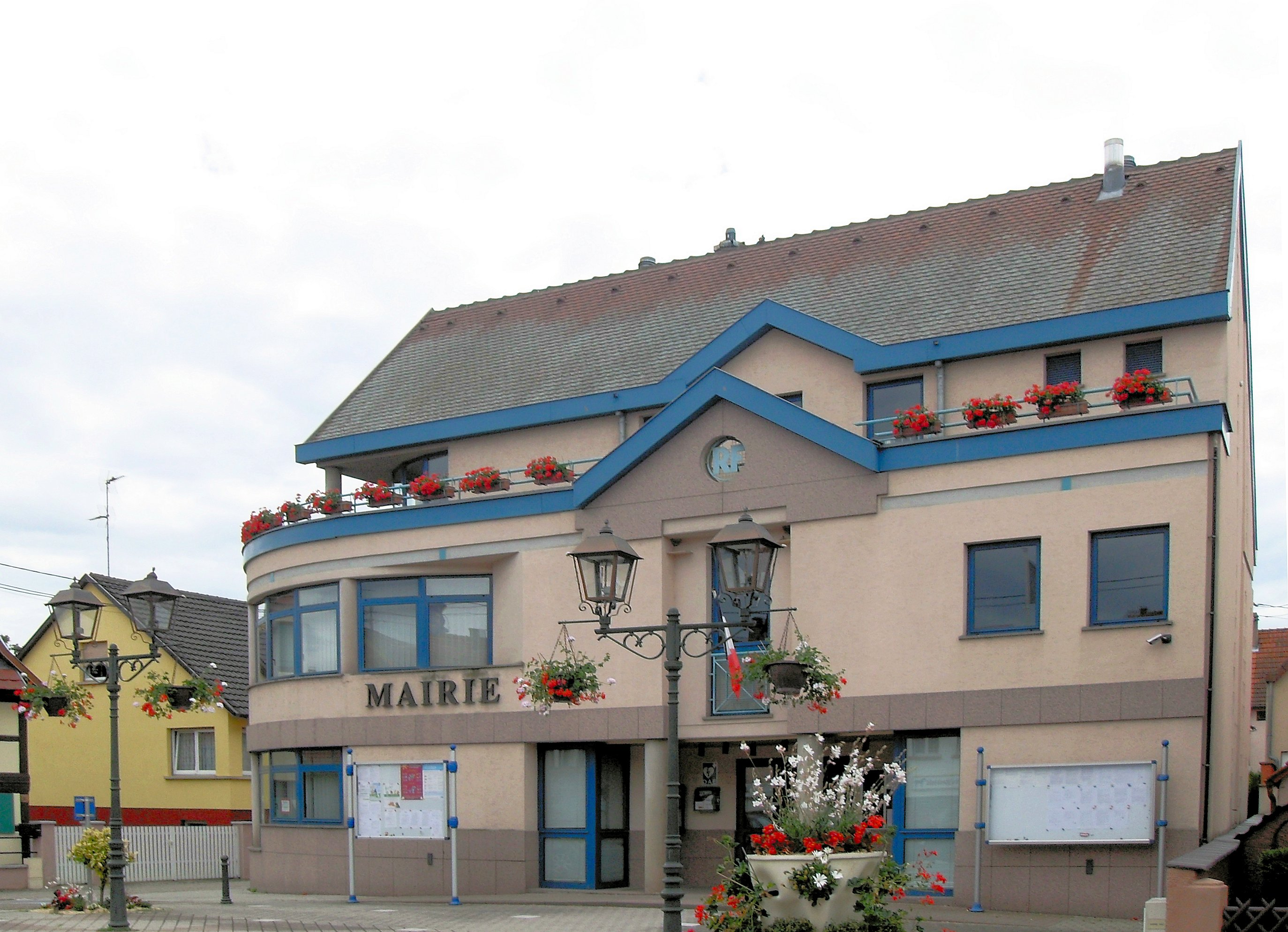
- The town hall in Achenheim

- Coat of arms
- Location of Achenheim
- Location within France Location within Grand Est
- Coordinates: 48°34′55″N 7°37′40″E
- Country: France
- Region: Grand Est
- Department: Bas-Rhin
- Arrondissement: Strasbourg
- Canton: Lingolsheim
- Intercommunality: Eurométropole de Strasbourg

Government
  - Mayor (2020–2026): Valentin Rabot
- Area^{1}: 6.03 km^{2} (2.33 sq mi)
- Elevation: 167 m (548 ft)
- Highest elevation: 191 m (627 ft)
- Lowest elevation: 143 m (469 ft)
- Population (2023): 2,637
  - Density: 437/km^{2} (1,130/sq mi)
- Time zone: UTC+01:00 (CET)
  - Summer (DST): UTC+02:00 (CEST)
- INSEE/Postal code: 67001 /67204
- ^{1} French Land Register data, which excludes lakes, ponds, glaciers > 1 km^{2} (0.386 sq mi or 247 acres) and river estuaries.

Achenheim (French pronunciation: [axənaim]; Alsatian: Àchene) is a commune in the Bas-Rhin department and Grand Est region of north-eastern France.

The village, which is in the arrondissement of Strasbourg and the canton of Lingolsheim lies close to the Canal de la Bruche and to the departmental road connecting Soultz-les-Bains to Strasbourg.

== History ==
The oldest traces of human habitation in Alsace – tools used by Homo erectus in the Paleolithic era some 700,000 years ago – have been found in loess deposits at Achenheim.

In 1264 the village was burnt down by forces from Strasbourg during the war between the city and its bishop, Walter de Geroldseck.

== Waterways ==
- Canal de la Bruche
- Bruche River

== Administration ==
List of mayors
Period		Name	Party	Remarks
1995	2008	Roger Viola	DVD	CEO of a family firm supplying building materials; re-elected in 2001
2008	2011	Jean-Jacques Fritz	MoDem then NC	European Parliament director in Strasbourg, Regional Councillor
2012	2020	Raymond Leipp	LR	Retired; acting mayor from 16 January 2012; re-elected in 2014
2020	incumbent	Valentin Rabot		

== Population ==
Historical population
Year	Pop.	±% p.a.
1968	1,207	—
1975	1,535	+3.49%
1982	1,717	+1.61%
1990	2,072	+2.38%
1999	2,183	+0.58%
2007	2,230	+0.27%
2012	2,043	−1.74%
2017	2,123	+0.77%
2023	2,637	+3.68%
Source: INSEE

== See also ==
- Communes of the Bas-Rhin department
