= Kolbsheim =

Kolbsheim Kolbse
- Commune
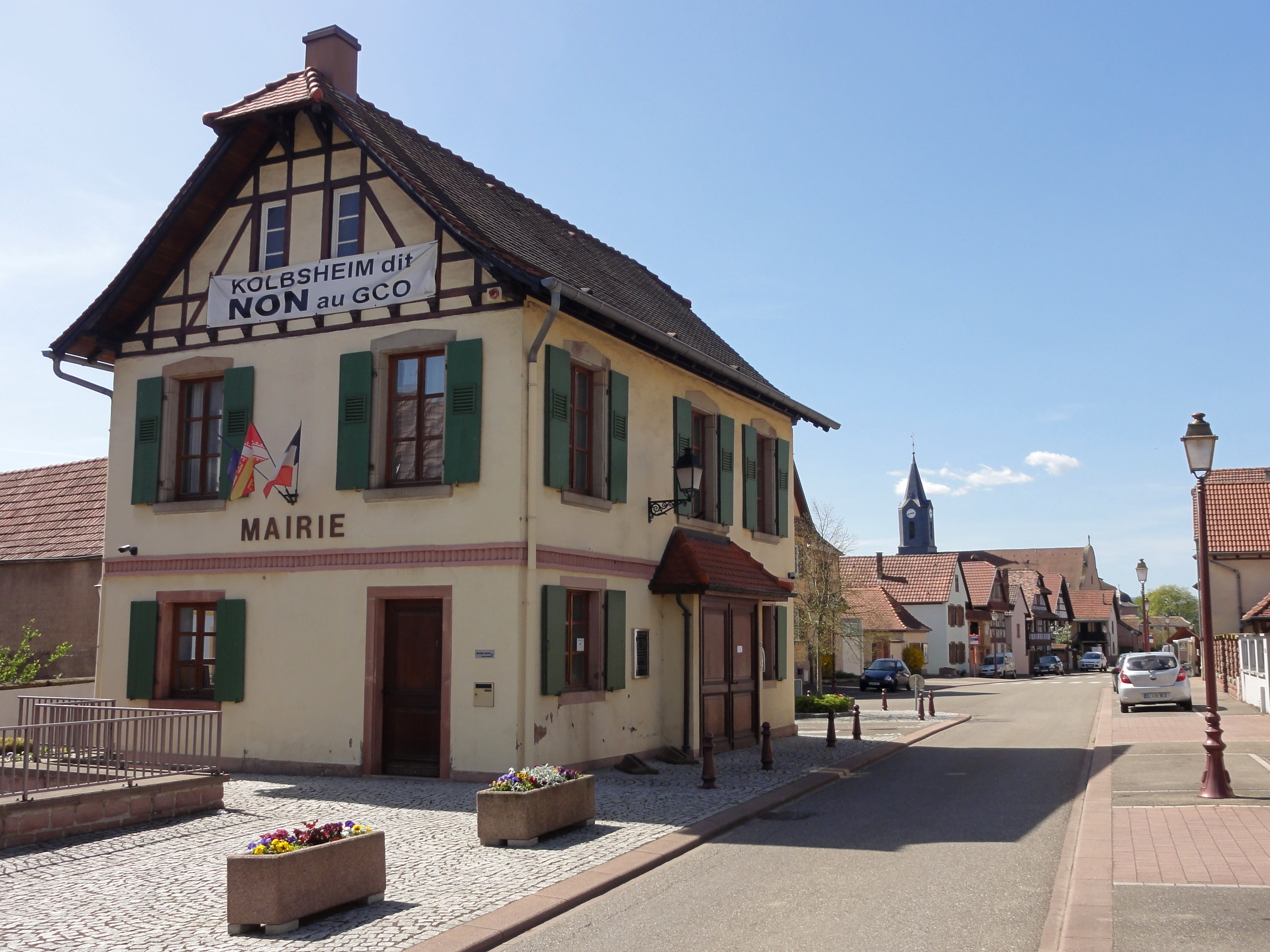
- The town hall in Kolbsheim

- Coat of arms
- Location of Kolbsheim
- Location within France Location within Grand Est
- Coordinates: 48°33′42″N 7°35′21″E
- Country: France
- Region: Grand Est
- Department: Bas-Rhin
- Arrondissement: Strasbourg
- Canton: Lingolsheim
- Intercommunality: Strasbourg Eurométropole

Government
  - Mayor (2020–2026): Annie Catherine Kessouri
- Area^{1}: 3.33 km^{2} (1.29 sq mi)
- Highest elevation: 211 m (692 ft)
- Lowest elevation: 152 m (499 ft)
- Population (2023): 1,022
  - Density: 307/km^{2} (795/sq mi)
- Time zone: UTC+01:00 (CET)
  - Summer (DST): UTC+02:00 (CEST)
- INSEE/Postal code: 67247 /67120
- ^{1} French Land Register data, which excludes lakes, ponds, glaciers > 1 km^{2} (0.386 sq mi or 247 acres) and river estuaries.

Kolbsheim is a commune in the Bas-Rhin department in Grand Est in north-eastern France.

Between June 1974 and January 1983 the commune was merged with Duppigheim.

== Geography ==
Kolbsheim is an Alsatian village positioned a short distance to the south-west of Strasbourg, and less than two kilometres from Strasbourg Airport. Adjacent communes are Hangenbieten, Breuschwickersheim and Ernolsheim sur Bruche.

== Notable people ==
- Jacques Maritain
- Raïssa Maritain

== See also ==
- Château de Kolbsheim
- Communes of the Bas-Rhin department
