= Lampertheim, Bas-Rhin =

Lampertheim Làmperte (Alsatian)
- Commune
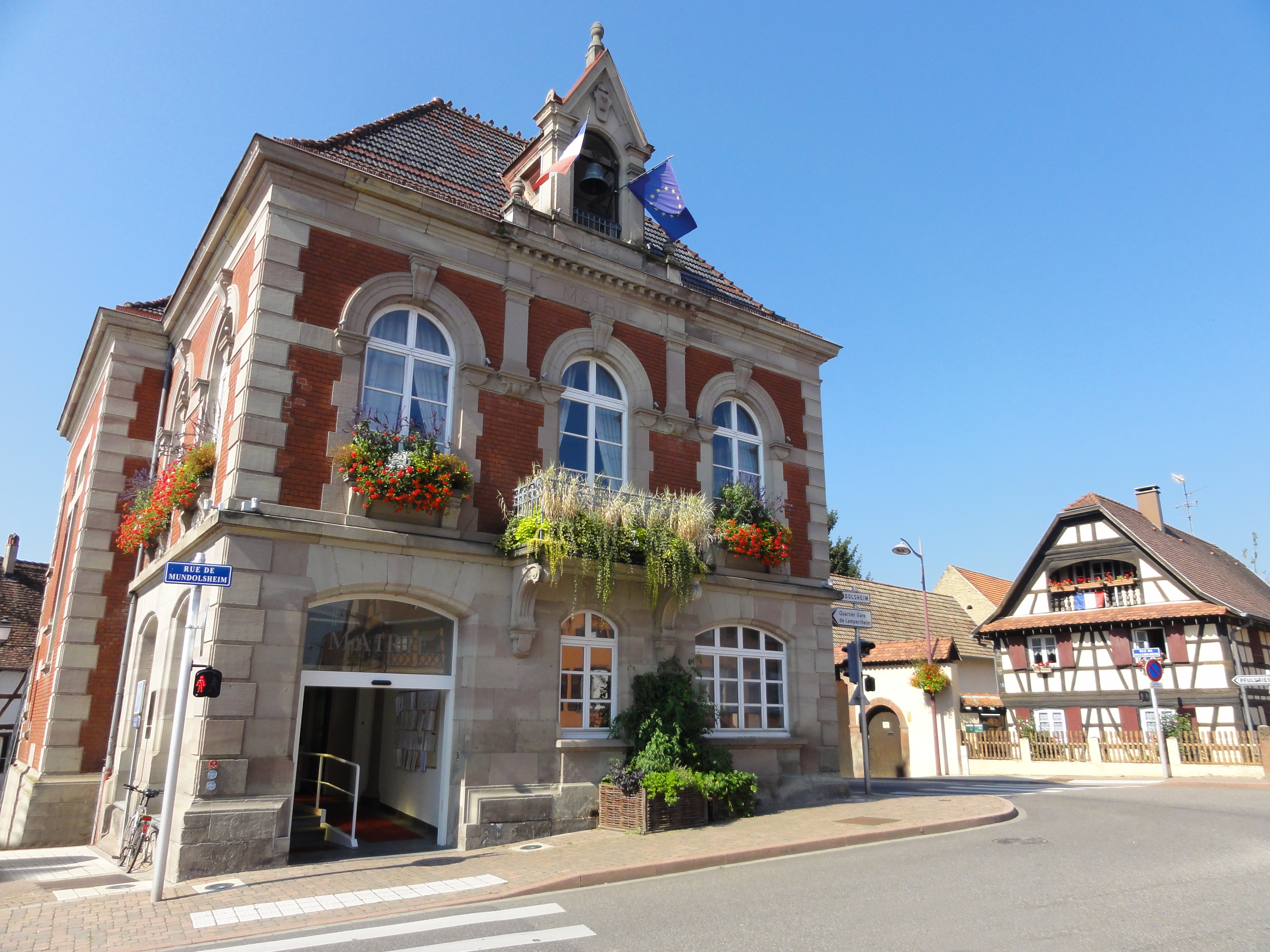
- The town hall in Lampertheim

- Coat of arms
- Location of Lampertheim
- Location within France Location within Grand Est
- Coordinates: 48°39′07″N 7°41′55″E
- Country: France
- Region: Grand Est
- Department: Bas-Rhin
- Arrondissement: Strasbourg
- Canton: Hœnheim
- Intercommunality: Strasbourg Eurométropole

Government
  - Mayor (2020–2026): Murielle Fabre
- Area^{1}: 6.58 km^{2} (2.54 sq mi)
- Highest elevation: 184 m (604 ft)
- Lowest elevation: 137 m (449 ft)
- Population (2023): 3,457
  - Density: 525/km^{2} (1,360/sq mi)
- Time zone: UTC+01:00 (CET)
  - Summer (DST): UTC+02:00 (CEST)
- INSEE/Postal code: 67256 /67450
- ^{1} French Land Register data, which excludes lakes, ponds, glaciers > 1 km^{2} (0.386 sq mi or 247 acres) and river estuaries.

Lampertheim (Alsatian: Làmperte) is a commune of the Bas-Rhin department in Grand Est in north-eastern France.

The town shares a large shopping centre (Parc commercial Strasbourg nord) with the neighbouring communes of Mundolsheim und Vendenheim.

== Population ==
Historical population
Year	Pop.	±% p.a.
1968	1,081	—
1975	1,728	+6.93%
1982	2,085	+2.72%
1990	2,619	+2.89%
1999	2,949	+1.33%
2007	3,015	+0.28%
2012	2,914	−0.68%
2017	3,272	+2.34%
2023	3,457	+0.92%
Source: INSEE

== People ==
Léo Schnug, artist and painter, was born at Lampertheim in 1878. He would die at Brumath-Stephansfeld on 15 December 1933; his body being returned to Lampertheim where his grave can be visited in the town cemetery.

== See also ==
- Communes of the Bas-Rhin department
