= Soultz =

Soultz could refer to any of three communes of Alsace in north-eastern France:

- Soultz-Haut-Rhin
- Soultz-sous-Forêts
- Soultz-les-Bains
