= Bruche (river) =

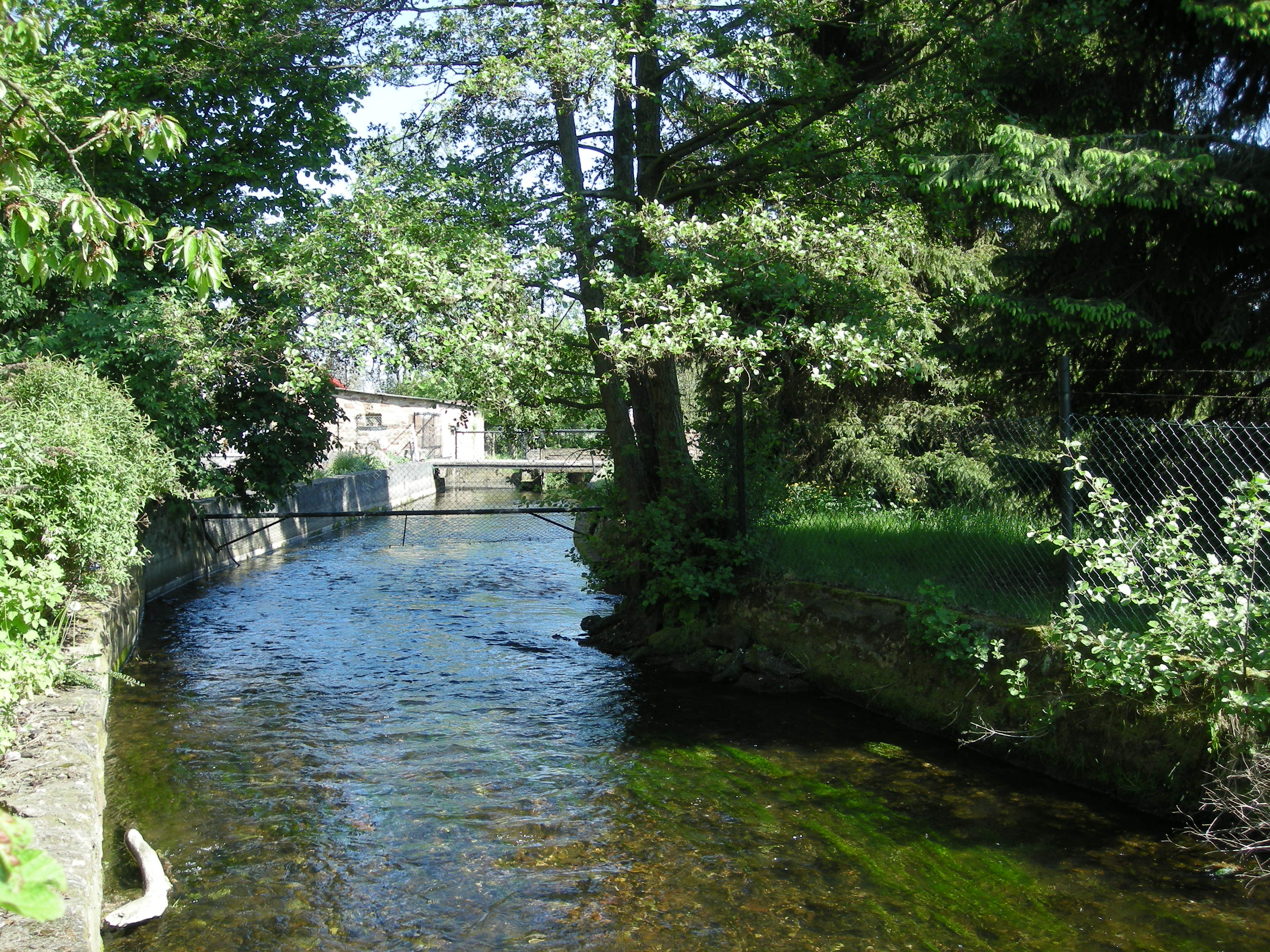
- The Bruche at Dinsheim-sur-Bruche

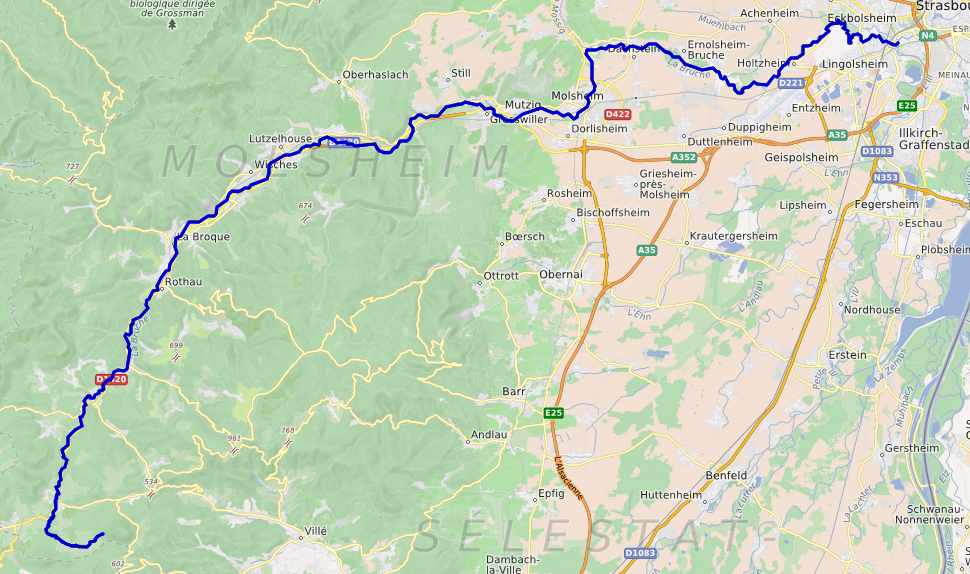

Location
- Country: France
- Region: Grand Est

Physical characteristics
- Source: Vosges
- Mouth
  - location: Ill
  - coordinates: 48°34′05″N 7°42′47″E
- Length: 77 km (48 mi)
- Basin size: 720 km^{2} (280 sq mi)

Basin features
- Progression: Ill→ Rhine→ North Sea

The Bruche (French pronunciation: [bʁyʃ]) is a river in Alsace, in north-eastern France. It is a left-side tributary of the Ill, and part of the Rhine basin. It is 76.7 km long, and has a drainage basin of 720 km^{2}. Its source is in the Vosges, at the western foot of the mountain Climont, near the village of Bourg-Bruche. It flows through the towns Schirmeck, Mutzig, Molsheim and Holtzheim. It flows into the Ill in the city of Strasbourg, southwest of the historic centre. Its largest tributary is the river Mossig.

At Wolxheim, where the Bruche and Mossig meet, part of the water feeds the Canal de la Bruche, built in 1682 to link the sandstone quarries at Soultz-les-Bains with Strasbourg. The canal remained in use until 1939.
