= Plobsheim =

Plobsheim Plobse
- Commune
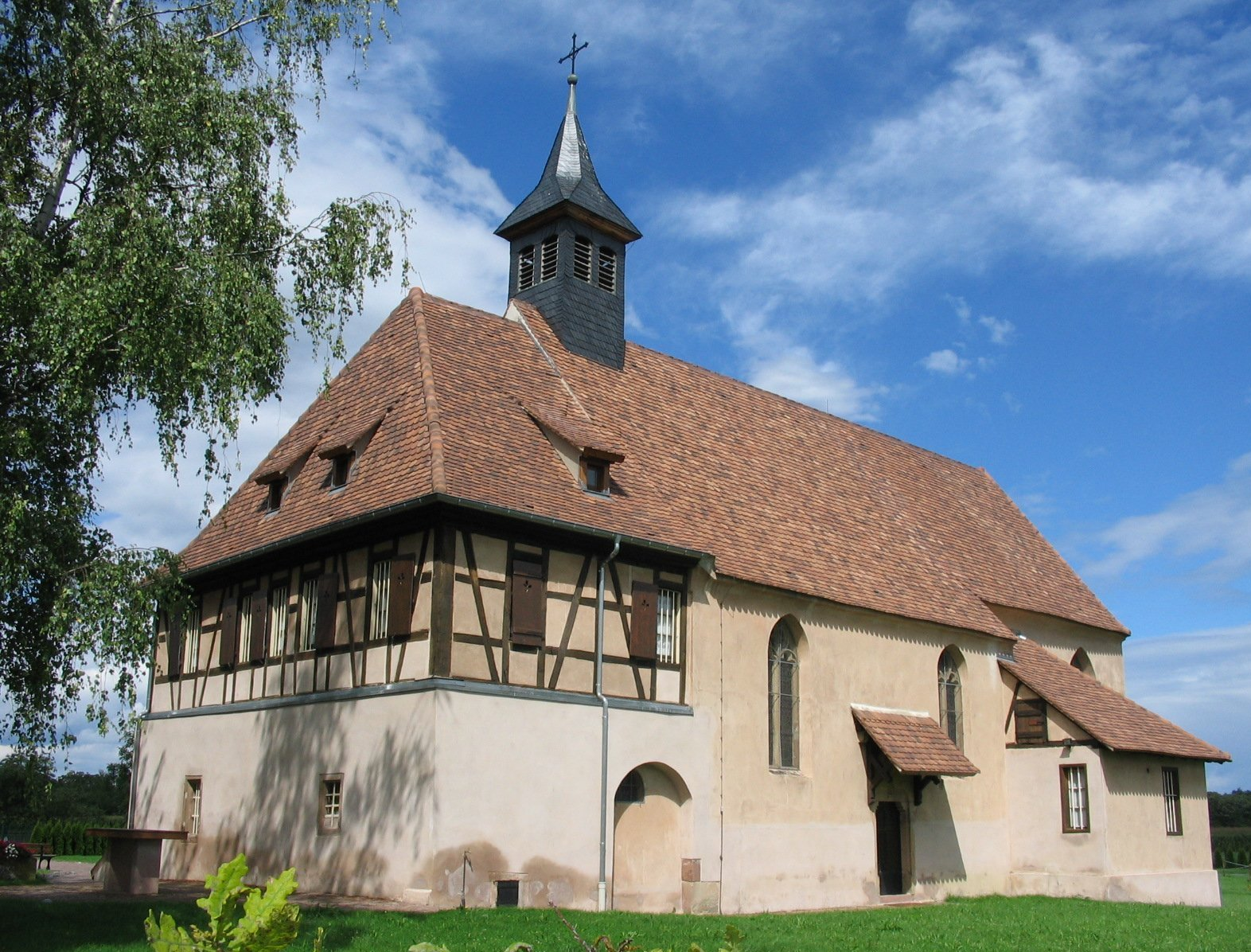
- Notre Dame du Chêne chapel

- Coat of arms
- Location of Plobsheim
- Location within France Location within Grand Est
- Coordinates: 48°28′14″N 7°43′36″E
- Country: France
- Region: Grand Est
- Department: Bas-Rhin
- Arrondissement: Strasbourg
- Canton: Illkirch-Graffenstaden
- Intercommunality: Strasbourg Eurométropole

Government
  - Mayor (2020–2026): Michèle Leckler
- Area^{1}: 16.64 km^{2} (6.42 sq mi)
- Elevation: 150 m (490 ft)
- Highest elevation: 151 m (495 ft)
- Lowest elevation: 144 m (472 ft)
- Population (2023): 4,492
  - Density: 270.0/km^{2} (699.2/sq mi)
- Time zone: UTC+01:00 (CET)
  - Summer (DST): UTC+02:00 (CEST)
- INSEE/Postal code: 67378 /67115
- ^{1} French Land Register data, which excludes lakes, ponds, glaciers > 1 km^{2} (0.386 sq mi or 247 acres) and river estuaries.

Plobsheim (French pronunciation: [plɔbsaim] or [plɔpsaim]; Alsatian: Plobse) is a commune in the Bas-Rhin department in Grand Est in north-eastern France.

== Population ==
Historical population
Year	Pop.	±% p.a.
1968	2,273	—
1975	2,309	+0.22%
1982	3,167	+4.62%
1990	3,306	+0.54%
1999	3,634	+1.06%
2007	3,702	+0.23%
2012	4,110	+2.11%
2017	4,443	+1.57%
2023	4,492	+0.18%
Source: INSEE

== List of mayors ==
Name	Entered office	Left office
Michèle Leckler	May 2020	In office
Anne-Catherine Weber	March 2014	May 2020
Gérard Kammerer	1995	2014
Geoffroi Bapst	1977	1995
Albert Fischer	1953	1977
Albert Ammel	1945	1953
Frédéric Clauss	1943	1945

== Twin town ==
- Port-Sainte-Foy-et-Ponchapt, France

== See also ==
- Communes of the Bas-Rhin department
- Wolf Christoph Zorn von Plobsheim
