= Fegersheim =

Fegersheim Fajersche
- Commune
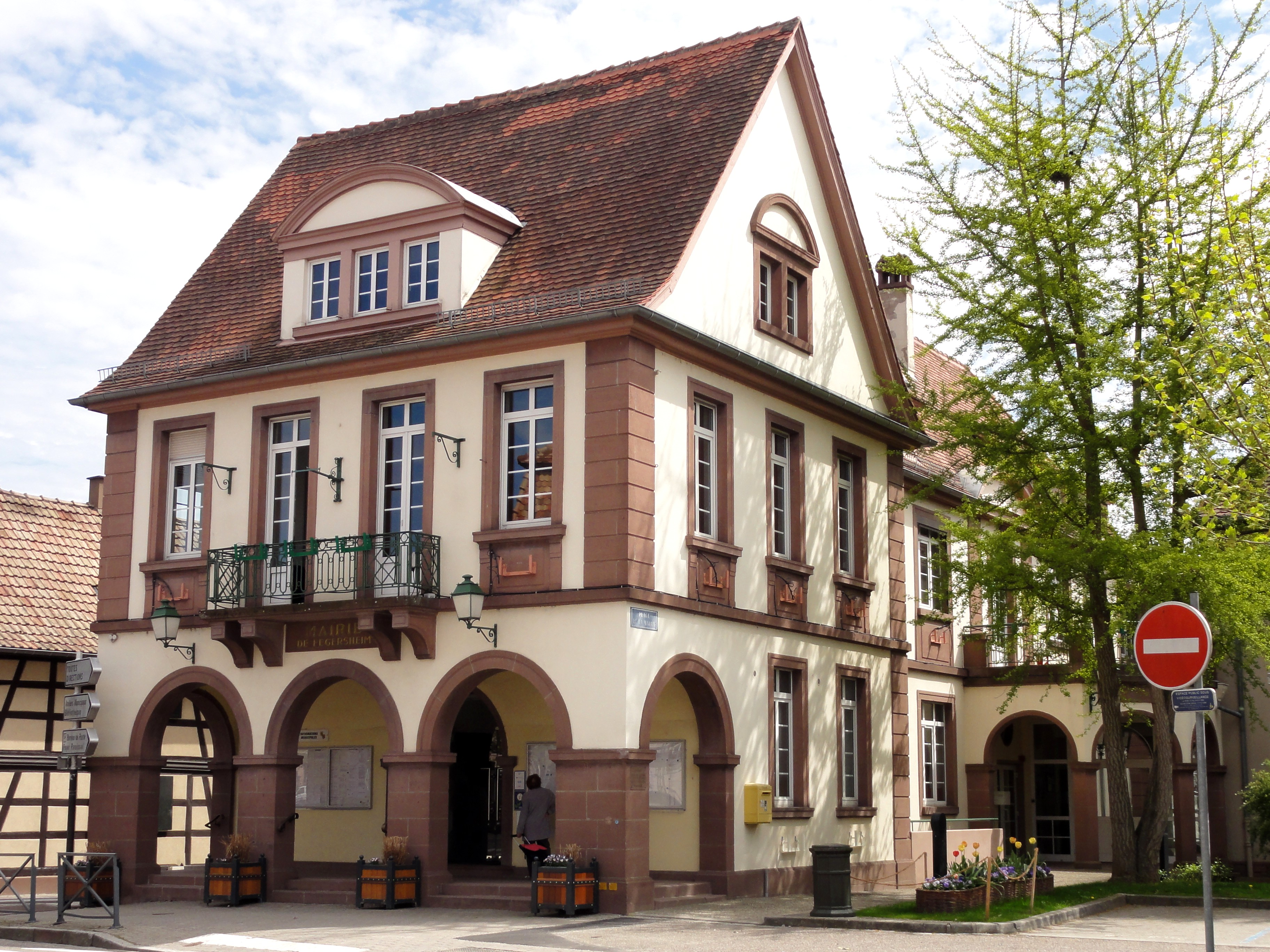
- The town hall in Fegersheim

- Coat of arms
- Location of Fegersheim
- Location within France Location within Grand Est
- Coordinates: 48°29′29″N 7°40′52″E
- Country: France
- Region: Grand Est
- Department: Bas-Rhin
- Arrondissement: Strasbourg
- Canton: Lingolsheim
- Intercommunality: Strasbourg Eurométropole

Government
  - Mayor (2020–2026): Thierry Schaal
- Area^{1}: 6.25 km^{2} (2.41 sq mi)
- Highest elevation: 149 m (489 ft)
- Lowest elevation: 142 m (466 ft)
- Population (2023): 5,780
  - Density: 925/km^{2} (2,400/sq mi)
- Time zone: UTC+01:00 (CET)
  - Summer (DST): UTC+02:00 (CEST)
- INSEE/Postal code: 67137 /67640
- ^{1} French Land Register data, which excludes lakes, ponds, glaciers > 1 km^{2} (0.386 sq mi or 247 acres) and river estuaries.

Fegersheim (French pronunciation: [fegəʁsajm]) is a commune in the Bas-Rhin department in Grand Est in north-eastern France.

== Geography and Economics ==
Fegersheim is located 12 kilometres (7 mi) to the south of Strasbourg, between the Rivers Andlau, Scheer and Ill.

Between 1962 and 1999 the registered population increased from 2153 to 4533, reflecting economic growth in the Strasbourg area.

== History ==
The discovery of tombs from the third century BC indicates that the site was occupied during the Celtic period.

The little town acquired its urban status in the eleventh century. At that time the Benedictine monastery of nearby Eschau owned a substantial property in Fegersheim. In the following centuries until 1789 Fegersheim and its conjoined settlement of Ohnheim would be held as an episcopal fiefdom, successively, by Ochsenstein, Hanau-Lichtenberg and Rathsamhausen.

Fegersheim enjoyed a few days of prominence in 1680 when the court of Louis XIV, accompanied by Bishop Bossuet (tutor to the Dauphin) and the king's mistress stayed here while awaiting the arrival of the Grand Dauphins's new bride. Five days of public celebrations ensued.

For centuries Fegersheim survived on a traditional agrarian economy, but industry appeared in 1933 in the form of the Cajofé toy factory. In 1962 the local council designated one of France's first formal industrial zones here in order to encourage the provision of local employment. The industrial zone benefits from excellent road connections and the proximity of Strasbourg: its story has been one of successful development, already for nearly half a century.

== Population ==
Historical population
Year	Pop.	±% p.a.
1968	2,350	—
1975	2,900	+3.05%
1982	3,646	+3.32%
1990	3,953	+1.02%
1999	4,533	+1.53%
2007	5,173	+1.66%
2012	5,443	+1.02%
2017	5,737	+1.06%
2023	5,780	+0.12%
Source: INSEE

== See also ==
- Communes of the Bas-Rhin department
