= Canton of Lingolsheim =

Coordinates: 48.56°N 7.68°E

- Canton
- Situation of the canton of Lingolsheim in the department of Bas-Rhin
- Country: France
- Region: Grand Est
- Department: Bas-Rhin
- No. of communes: {{{nbcomm}}}
- Population (2023): 55,319
- INSEE code: 6709

The canton of Lingolsheim is an administrative division of the Bas-Rhin department, northeastern France. It was created at the French canton reorganisation which came into effect in March 2015. Its seat is in Lingolsheim.

It consists of the following communes:

1. Achenheim
2. Blaesheim
3. Breuschwickersheim
4. Entzheim
5. Fegersheim
6. Geispolsheim
7. Hangenbieten
8. Holtzheim
9. Kolbsheim
10. Lingolsheim
11. Lipsheim
12. Oberschaeffolsheim
13. Osthoffen
