= Blaesheim =

Blaesheim Blaase
- Commune
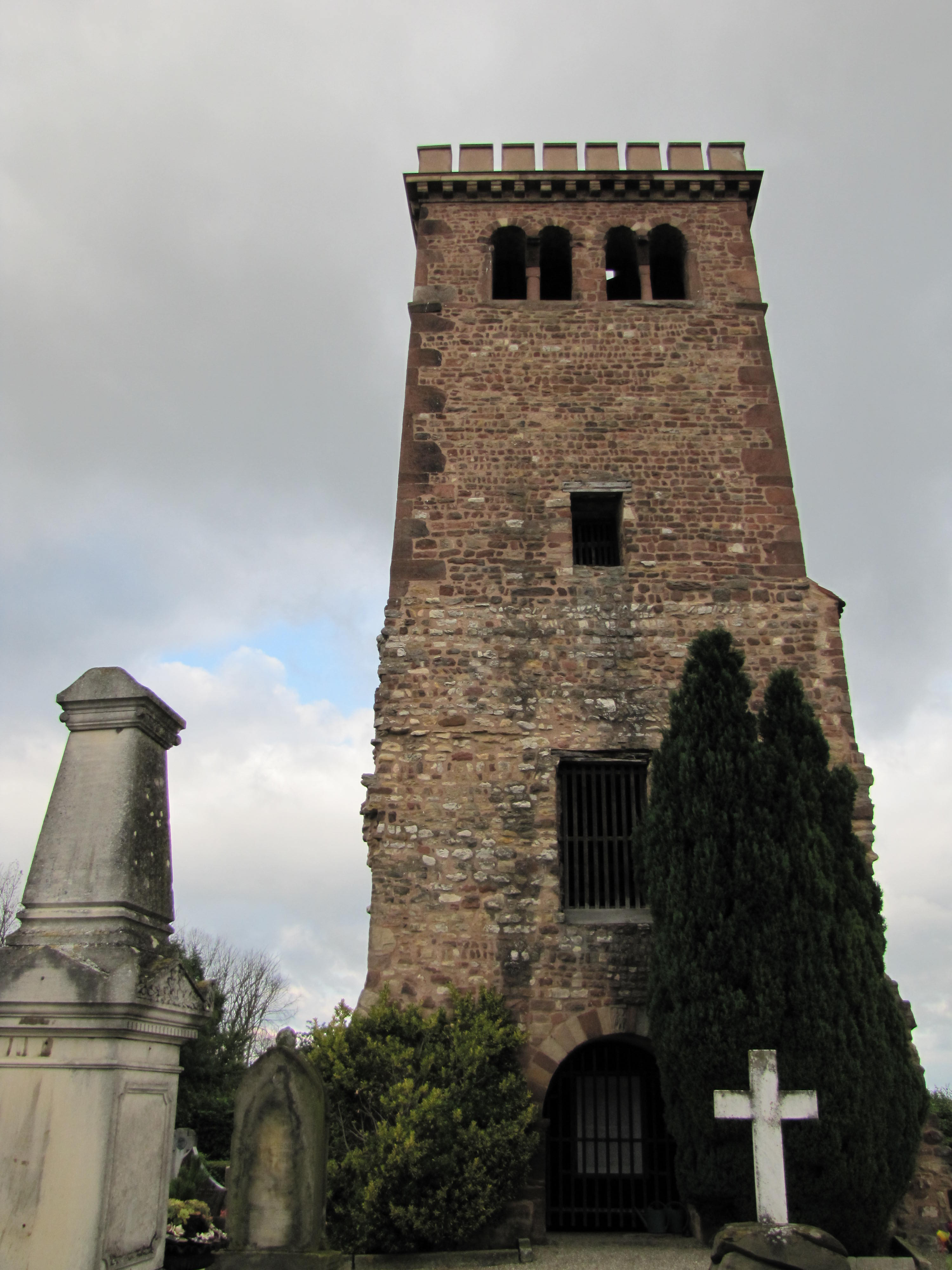
- 11th-12th-century church bell, Blaesheim

- Coat of arms
- Location of Blaesheim
- Location within France Location within Grand Est
- Coordinates: 48°31′N 7°37′E
- Country: France
- Region: Grand Est
- Department: Bas-Rhin
- Arrondissement: Strasbourg
- Canton: Lingolsheim
- Intercommunality: Strasbourg Eurométropole

Government
  - Mayor (2020–2026): Jacques Baur
- Area^{1}: 9.96 km^{2} (3.85 sq mi)
- Highest elevation: 198 m (650 ft)
- Lowest elevation: 146 m (479 ft)
- Population (2023): 1,461
  - Density: 147/km^{2} (380/sq mi)
- Time zone: UTC+01:00 (CET)
  - Summer (DST): UTC+02:00 (CEST)
- INSEE/Postal code: 67049 /67113
- ^{1} French Land Register data, which excludes lakes, ponds, glaciers > 1 km^{2} (0.386 sq mi or 247 acres) and river estuaries.

Blaesheim (French pronunciation: [blɛsaim]; German: Bläsheim; Alsatian: Blaase) is a commune in the Bas-Rhin department in Grand Est in northeastern France.

== Population ==
Historical population
| Year | Pop. | ±% p.a. |
|---|---|---|
| 1968 | 754 | — |
| 1975 | 908 | +2.69% |
| 1982 | 934 | +0.40% |
| 1990 | 1,000 | +0.86% |
| 1999 | 1,369 | +3.55% |
| 2007 | 1,299 | −0.65% |
| 2012 | 1,275 | −0.37% |
| 2017 | 1,316 | +0.64% |
| 2023 | 1,461 | +1.76% |
Source: INSEE

== Blaesheim process ==
A meeting held in Blaesheim, January 2001, between Jacques Chirac and Gerhard Schröder has given this name to a regular series of informal meetings between the French President, the German Chancellor, and their foreign ministers. The meetings are held alternately in France and Germany.

== See also ==
- Communes of the Bas-Rhin department
