= Oberschaeffolsheim =

- Commune
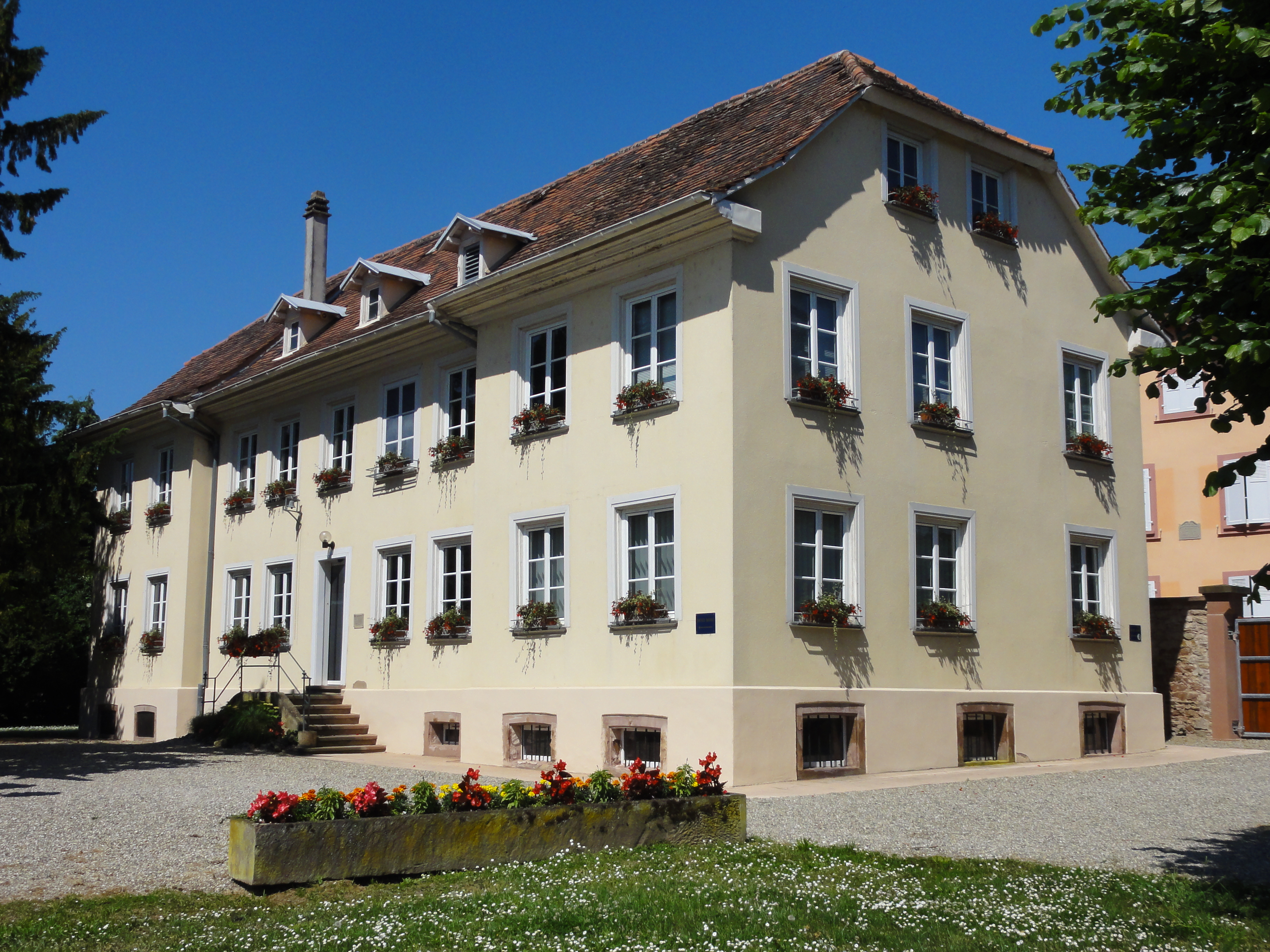
- The town hall in Oberschaeffolsheim

- Coat of arms
- Location of Oberschaeffolsheim
- Location within France Location within Grand Est
- Coordinates: 48°35′11″N 7°38′56″E
- Country: France
- Region: Grand Est
- Department: Bas-Rhin
- Arrondissement: Strasbourg
- Canton: Lingolsheim
- Intercommunality: Strasbourg Eurométropole

Government
  - Mayor (2020–2026): Jean Paul Preve
- Area^{1}: 7.56 km^{2} (2.92 sq mi)
- Highest elevation: 181 m (594 ft)
- Lowest elevation: 142 m (466 ft)
- Population (2023): 2,597
  - Density: 344/km^{2} (890/sq mi)
- Time zone: UTC+01:00 (CET)
  - Summer (DST): UTC+02:00 (CEST)
- INSEE/Postal code: 67350 /67203
- ^{1} French Land Register data, which excludes lakes, ponds, glaciers > 1 km^{2} (0.386 sq mi or 247 acres) and river estuaries.

Oberschaeffolsheim (German: Oberschäffolsheim) is a commune in the Bas-Rhin department in Grand Est in north-eastern France.

== Population ==
Historical population
Year	Pop.	±% p.a.
1968	1,125	—
1975	1,047	−1.02%
1982	1,700	+7.17%
1990	2,037	+2.29%
1999	2,088	+0.28%
2007	2,132	+0.26%
2012	2,200	+0.63%
2017	2,301	+0.90%
2023	2,597	+2.04%
Source: INSEE

== See also ==
- Communes of the Bas-Rhin department
