= Château de Kolbsheim =

Château in Bas-Rhin, Alsace, France

Coordinates: 48°33′38″N 7°35′2″E

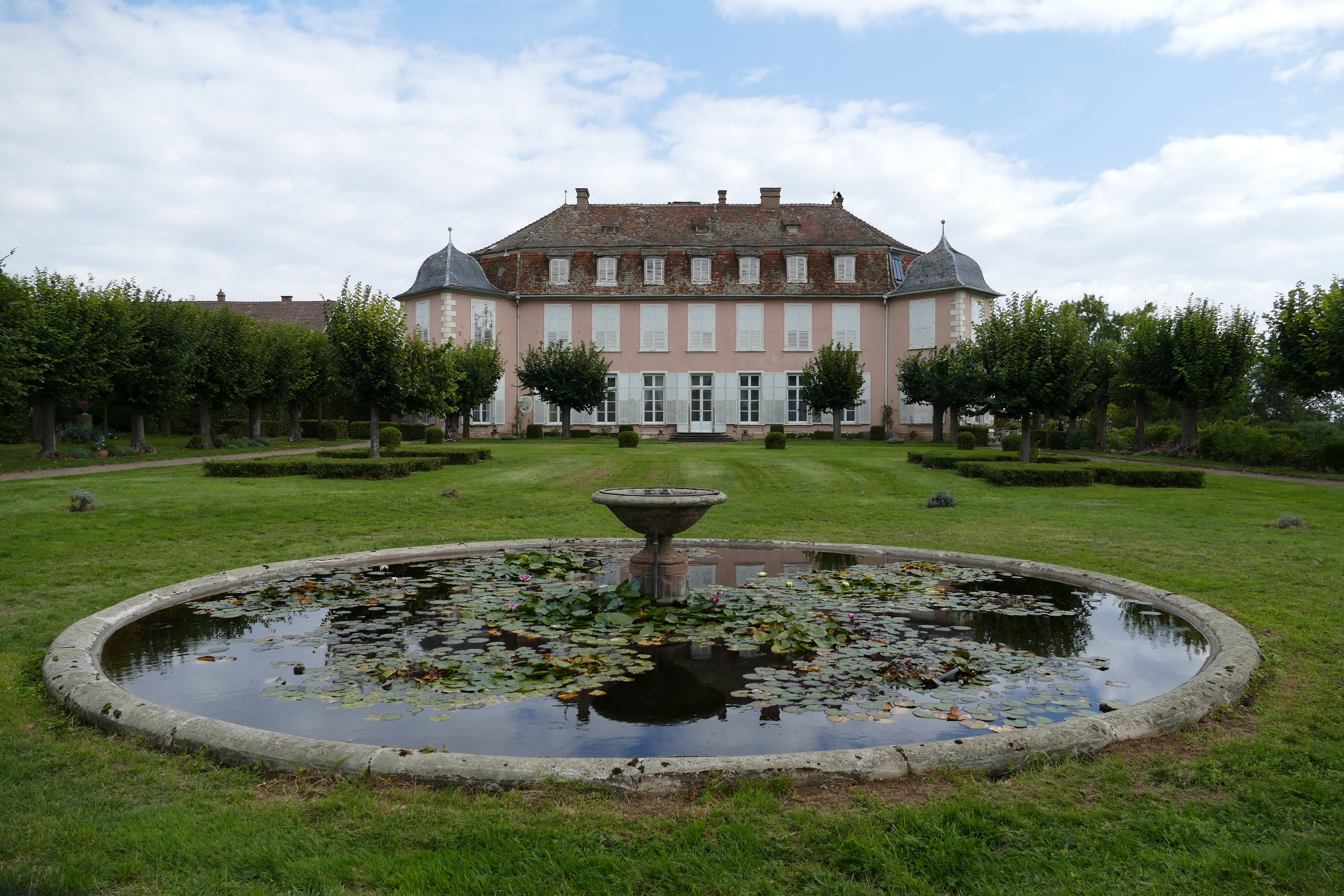
The west facade Kolbsheim Castle, a view from the upper terrace of the gardens

The Château de Kolbsheim is located near the town of Kolbsheim, in the French Department of Bas-Rhin, in Alsace. It is 15 kilometers southwest of Strasbourg, overlooking the plain of Alsace.

The chateau has two wings, the oldest of which was built in 1703. The upper part of the garden is a geometric French garden, featuring ponds, fountains, hedges, and sculpted trees. The lower part is an English park, with many hundred-year-old trees. Much of the garden was destroyed in the First World War, but was restored by the Grunelius family, the present owners.

The Garden is classified by the French Ministry of Culture as among The Notable Gardens of France.
