= Arrondissement of Strasbourg =

Coordinates: 48.6°N 7.7°E

Strasbourg Strossburi
- Arrondissement
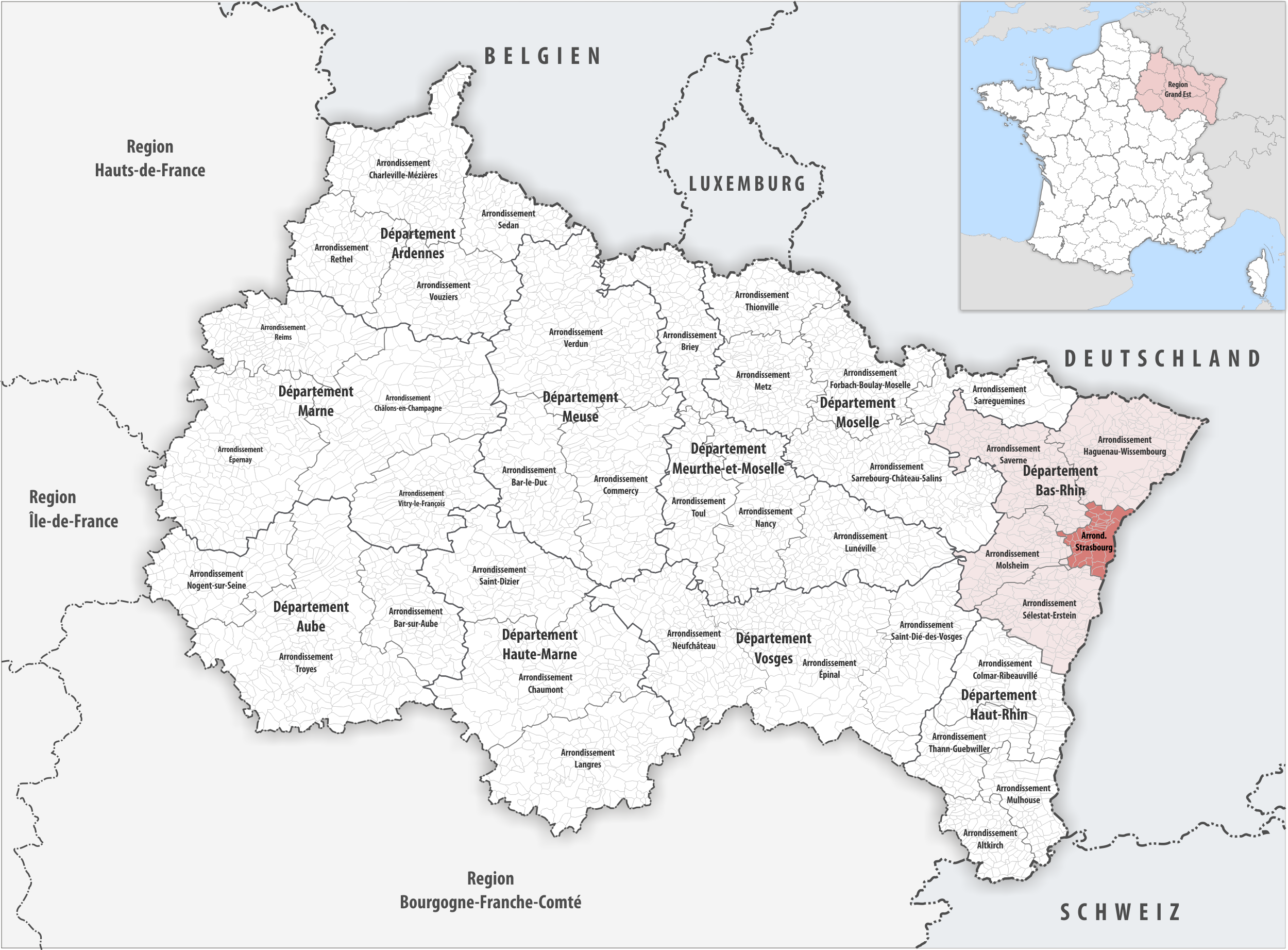
- Location within the region Grand Est
- Country: France
- Region: Grand Est
- Department: Bas-Rhin
- No. of communes: {{{nbcomm}}}
- Area: 337.6 km^{2} (130.3 sq mi)
- Population (2023): 522,596
  - Density: 1,548/km^{2} (4,009/sq mi)
- INSEE code: 678

The arrondissement of Strasbourg (French: Arrondissement de Strasbourg; Alsatian: Arrondissement Strossburi) is an arrondissement of France in the Bas-Rhin department in the Grand Est region. It has 33 communes. Its population is 514,651 (2021), and its area is 337.6 km^{2} (130.3 sq mi).

== Composition ==
The communes of the arrondissement of Strasbourg are:

1. Achenheim
2. Bischheim
3. Blaesheim
4. Breuschwickersheim
5. Eckbolsheim
6. Eckwersheim
7. Entzheim
8. Eschau
9. Fegersheim
10. Geispolsheim
11. Hangenbieten
12. Hœnheim
13. Holtzheim
14. Illkirch-Graffenstaden
15. Kolbsheim
16. Lampertheim
17. Lingolsheim
18. Lipsheim
19. Mittelhausbergen
20. Mundolsheim
21. Niederhausbergen
22. Oberhausbergen
23. Oberschaeffolsheim
24. Osthoffen
25. Ostwald
26. Plobsheim
27. Reichstett
28. Schiltigheim
29. Souffelweyersheim
30. Strasbourg
31. Vendenheim
32. La Wantzenau
33. Wolfisheim

== History ==
The arrondissement of Strasbourg was created in 1800 and disbanded in 1871 (ceded to Germany). In January 2015 it was recreated from the former arrondissement of Strasbourg-Ville and 32 communes from the former arrondissement of Strasbourg-Campagne.
