= Wolfisheim =

Wolfisheim Wolfze (Alsatian)
- Commune
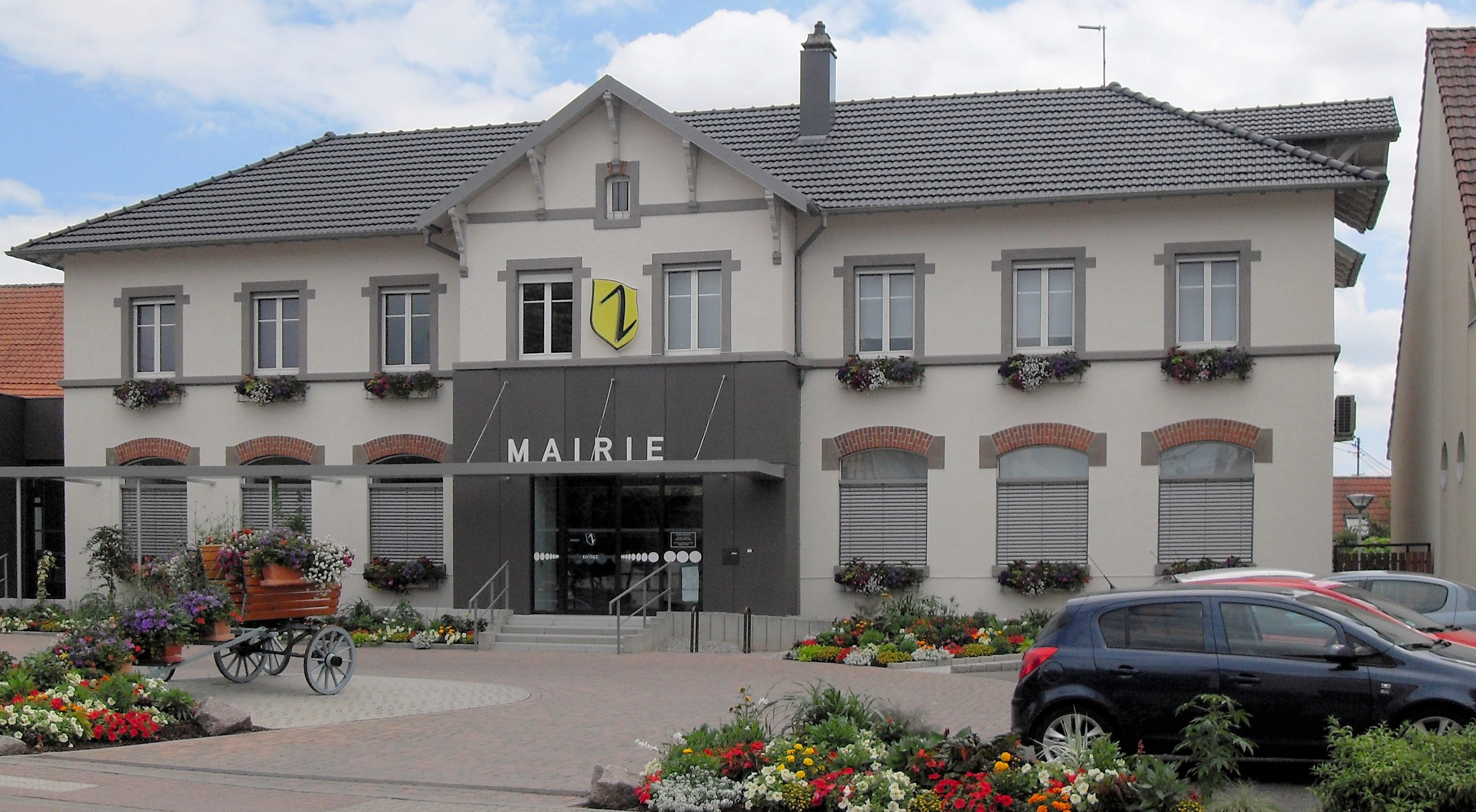
- The town hall in Wolfisheim

- Coat of arms
- Location of Wolfisheim
- Location within France Location within Grand Est
- Coordinates: 48°35′15″N 7°40′02″E
- Country: France
- Region: Grand Est
- Department: Bas-Rhin
- Arrondissement: Strasbourg
- Canton: Hœnheim
- Intercommunality: Eurométropole de Strasbourg

Government
  - Mayor (2020–2026): Éric Amiet
- Area^{1}: 5.57 km^{2} (2.15 sq mi)
- Elevation: 146 m (479 ft)
- Highest elevation: 172 m (564 ft)
- Lowest elevation: 141 m (463 ft)
- Population (2023): 4,217
  - Density: 757/km^{2} (1,960/sq mi)
- Time zone: UTC+01:00 (CET)
  - Summer (DST): UTC+02:00 (CEST)
- INSEE/Postal code: 67551 /67202
- ^{1} French Land Register data, which excludes lakes, ponds, glaciers > 1 km^{2} (0.386 sq mi or 247 acres) and river estuaries.

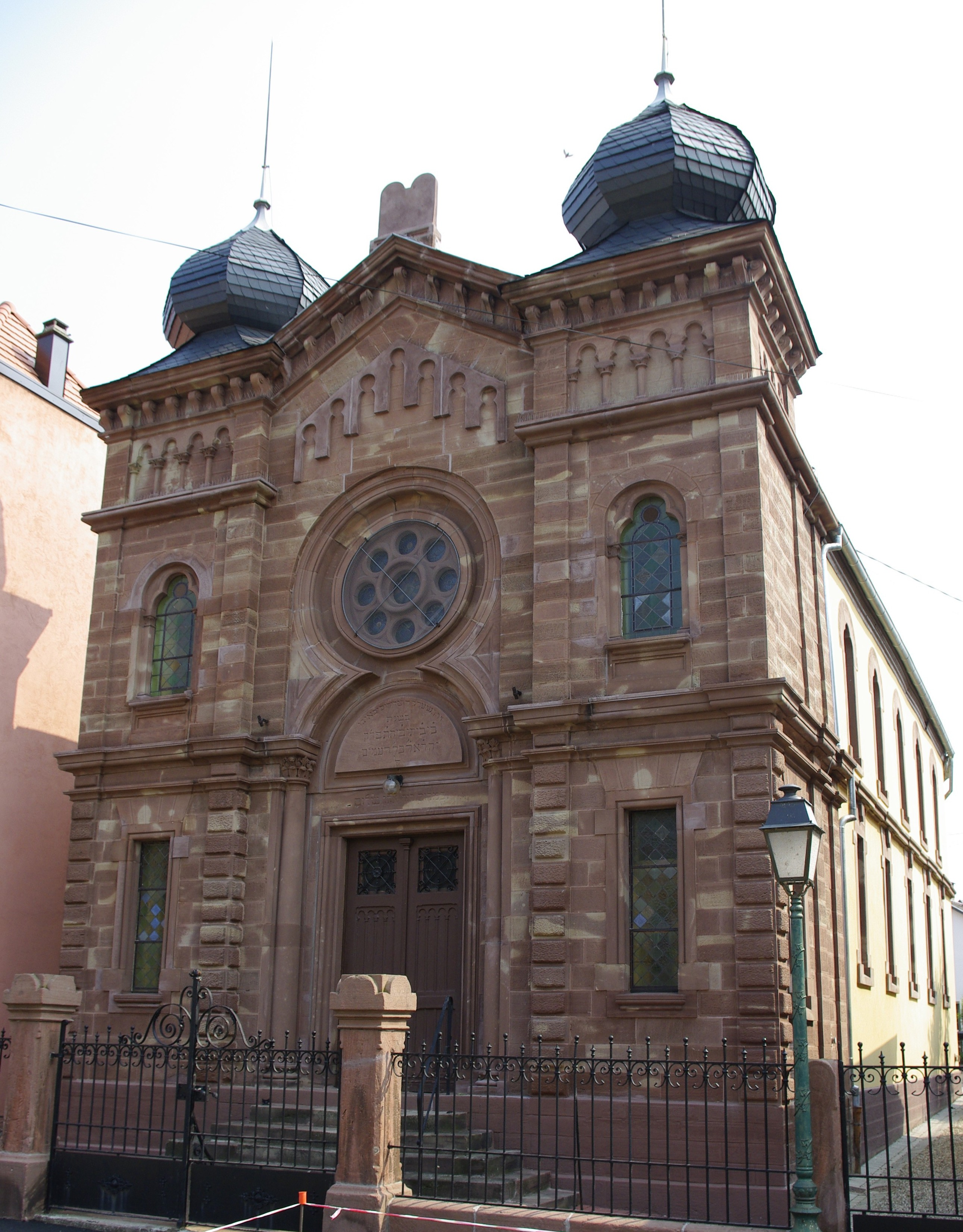
Wolfisheim's long abandoned synagogue has been recently restored

Wolfisheim (French pronunciation: [vɔlfisajm]; Alsatian: Wolfze) is a commune in the Bas-Rhin department in Grand Est in north-eastern France. Its synagogue, built in 1897, is a listed monument.

== Population ==
Historical population
Year	Pop.	±% p.a.
1968	1,780	—
1975	2,014	+1.78%
1982	2,135	+0.84%
1990	2,674	+2.85%
1999	3,832	+4.08%
2007	3,944	+0.36%
2012	3,984	+0.20%
2017	4,157	+0.85%
2023	4,217	+0.24%
Source: INSEE

== See also ==
- Communes of the Bas-Rhin department
