= Bruche Canal =

Canal in Bas-Rhin, France

Coordinates: 48.570277°N 7.710492°E

Canal de la Bruche
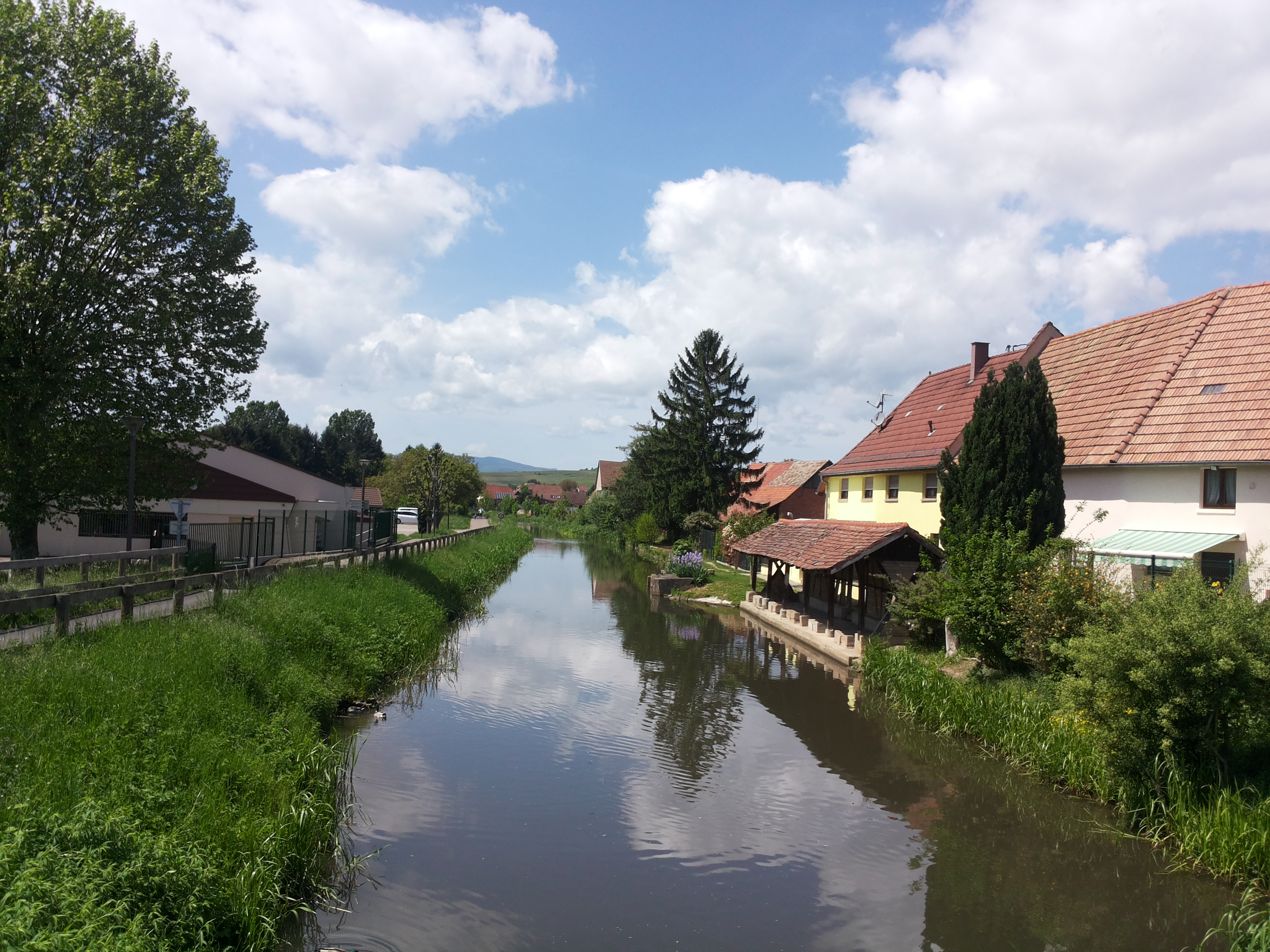
- Canal de La Bruche at Ergersheim

Specifications
- Length: 20 km (12 mi)
- Locks: 11
- Total rise: c. 30 m (98 ft)
- Status: Closed

History
- Principal engineer: Vauban
- Construction began: 1682
- Date closed: 1957

Geography
- Start point: Soultz-les-Bains
- End point: Strasbourg
- Connects to: River Ill

The Canal de la Bruche (French pronunciation: [kanal də la bʁyʃ]) is a canal in eastern France that originally connected Soultz-les-Bains, near Molsheim, to the city of Strasbourg. It was built in 1682 by the famous military engineer Vauban, principally to transport sandstone from the quarries of Soultz for use in the construction of the fortifications of Strasbourg. The last commercial load was carried in 1939 and the canal formally closed in 1957, after bridges damaged during World War II were rebuilt with insufficient headroom for navigation.

The canal is 20 kilometres (12 mi) long and has 11 locks on its course, with a total rise of almost 30 metres (98 ft). It roughly parallels the river Bruche (river), taking its water supply from the confluence of the Bruche and Mossig rivers at Wolxheim, with a secondary supply downriver at Kolbsheim. It enters the river Ill at Montagne Verte in Strasbourg, just downstream of the confluence of the Bruche and Ill, and some 2.5 kilometres (1.6 mi) upstream of the centre of the city. When the canal was built, the Ill provided navigable connections to the city and the Rhine, and in later years to the Canal du Rhone au Rhine and the Canal de la Marne au Rhin.

Although no longer navigable, the canal is retained in water, and is now managed by the Conseil Départemental du Bas-Rhin. The towpath has been converted into a cycle path, which forms part of the 3,900-kilometre (2,400 mi) long EuroVelo 5 route that links London with Brindisi.

== Gallery ==
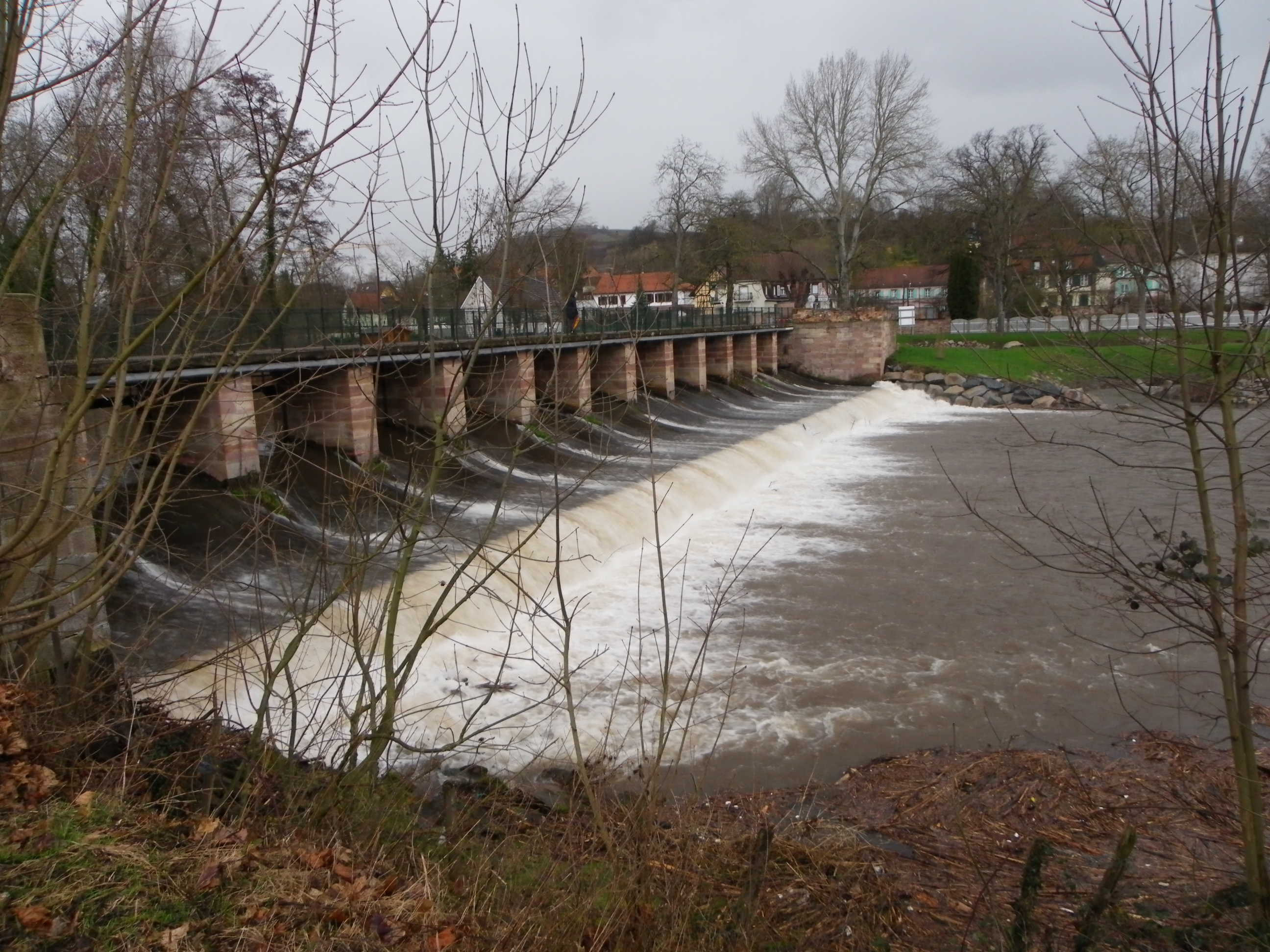
The dam on the River Bruche that feeds the canal

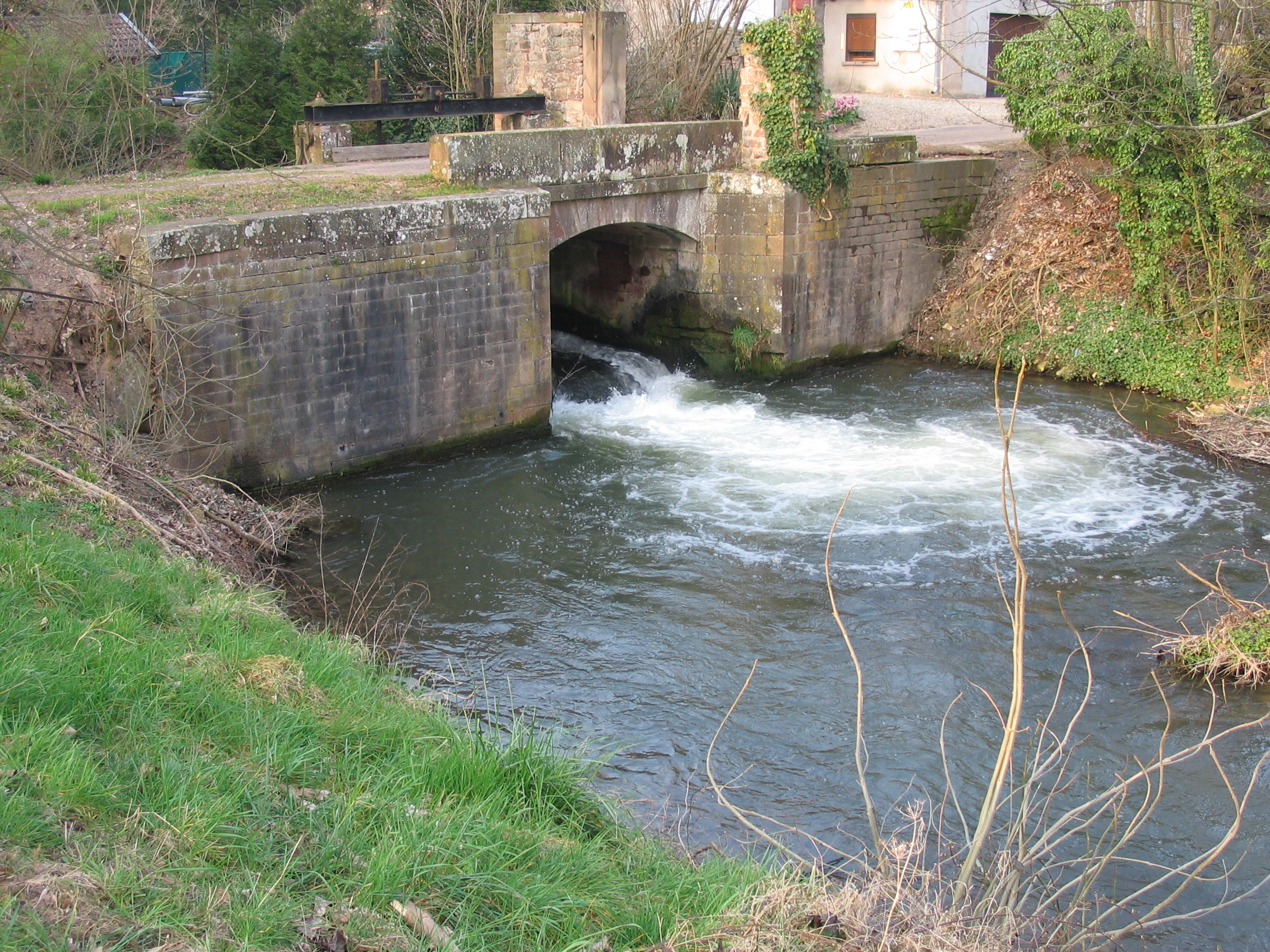
The head of the canal

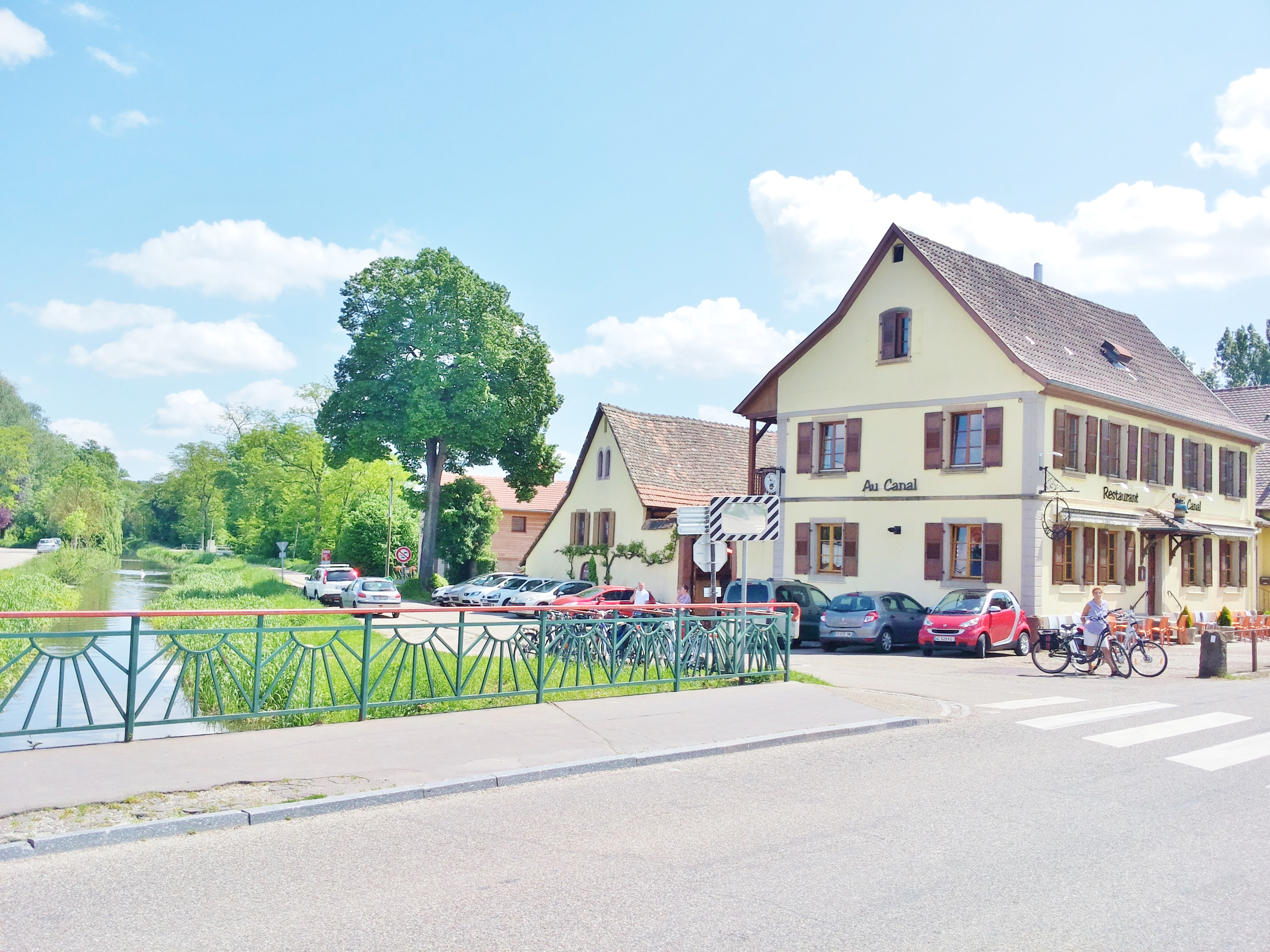
Canal and restaurant

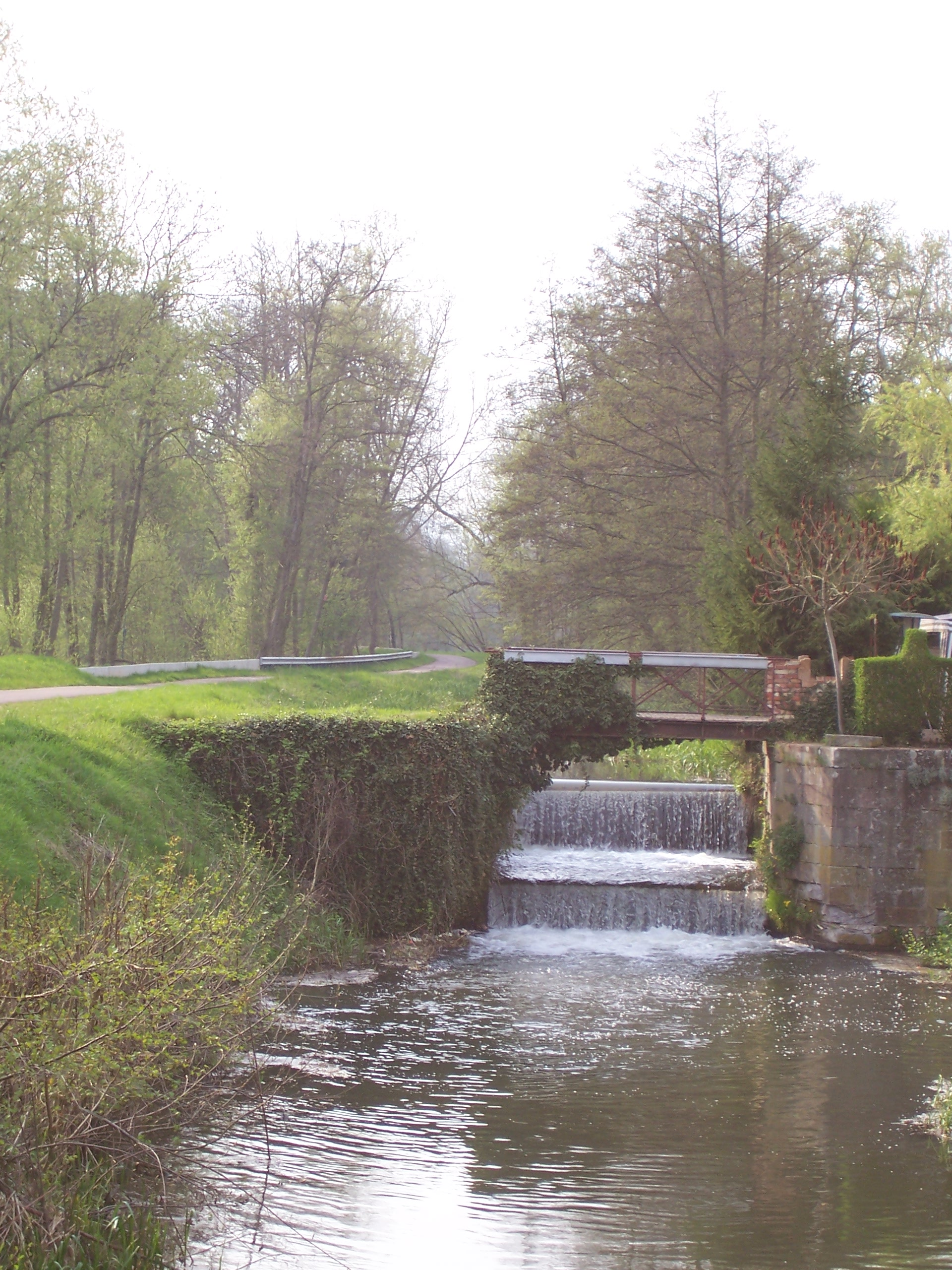
A disused lock on the canal

== See also ==
- List of canals in France
