= Eurométropole de Strasbourg =

Coordinates: 48.58°N 7.75°E

- Métropole
- Location of the metropolis, in the Bas-Rhin department.
- Country: France
- Region: Grand Est
- Department: Bas-Rhin
- No. of communes: {{{nbcomm}}}
- Established: 1966

Government
  - President (2026-2032): Catherine Trautmann
- Area: 337.6 km^{2} (130.3 sq mi)
- Population (2021): 514,651
  - Density: 1,524/km^{2} (3,948/sq mi)
- Website: strasbourg.eu

Eurométropole de Strasbourg (French pronunciation: [øʁɔmetʁɔpɔl də stʁasbuʁ]) is the métropole, an intercommunal structure, centred on the city of Strasbourg. It is located in the Bas-Rhin department, in the Grand Est region, northeastern France. It was created in January 2015, replacing the previous Communauté urbaine de Strasbourg, and covers that part of the Strasbourg metropolitan area that lies in France. Its area is 337.6 km^{2}. Its population was 514,651 in 2021, of which 291,313 is in Strasbourg proper. The annual budget of the métropole was €1.897 billion in 2020.

== History ==
The Urban Community of Strasbourg (French: Communauté urbaine de Strasbourg), also known by its French initials CUS, was established in December 1966. It became a métropole on 1 January 2015.

== Communes ==
The 33 communes of the métropole are, with number of inhabitants (population municipale) on 1 January 2021:

1. Achenheim: 2,504
2. Bischheim; 17,939
3. Blaesheim; 1,356
4. Breuschwickersheim: 1,337
5. Eckbolsheim; 7,199
6. Eckwersheim; 1,403
7. Entzheim; 2,520
8. Eschau; 5,746
9. Fegersheim; 5,777
10. Geispolsheim; 7,603
11. Hangenbieten: 1,740
12. Hœnheim; 11,469
13. Holtzheim; 3,931
14. Illkirch-Graffenstaden; 27,118
15. Kolbsheim: 1,002
16. Lampertheim; 3,458
17. Lingolsheim; 20,266
18. Lipsheim; 2,670
19. Mittelhausbergen; 2,094
20. Mundolsheim; 5,074
21. Niederhausbergen; 1,673
22. Oberhausbergen; 5,556
23. Oberschaeffolsheim; 2,592
24. Osthoffen: 802
25. Ostwald; 13,310
26. Plobsheim; 4,473
27. Reichstett; 4,376
28. Schiltigheim; 34,129
29. Souffelweyersheim; 8,120
30. Strasbourg; 291,313
31. Vendenheim; 6,042
32. La Wantzenau; 5,894
33. Wolfisheim; 4,165
