= Mittelhausbergen =

Mittelhausbergen Míttelhüsbàrje (Alsatian)
- Commune
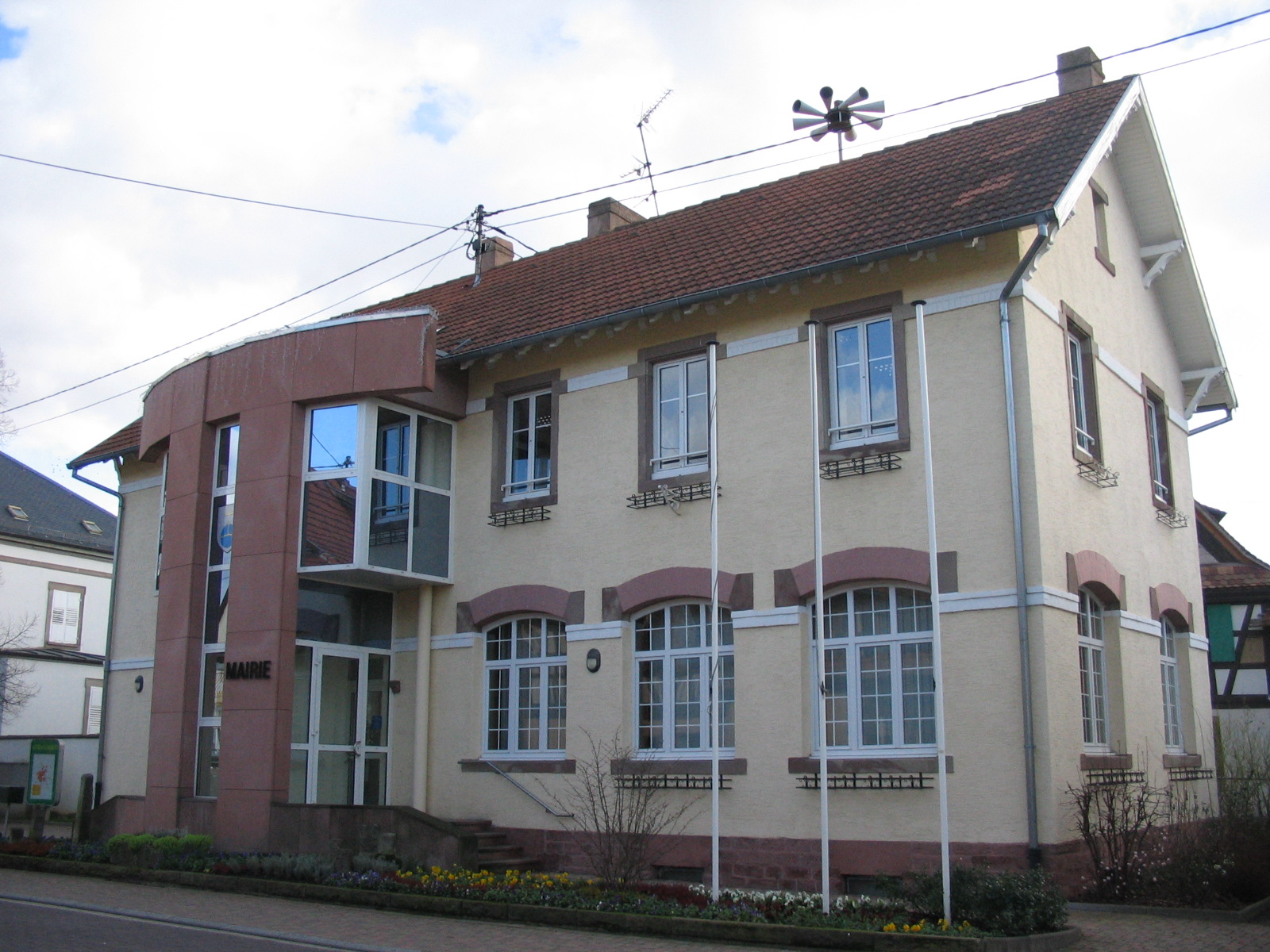
- The town hall in Mittelhausbergen

- Coat of arms
- Location of Mittelhausbergen
- Location within France Location within Grand Est
- Coordinates: 48°36′53″N 7°41′37″E
- Country: France
- Region: Grand Est
- Department: Bas-Rhin
- Arrondissement: Strasbourg
- Canton: Hœnheim
- Intercommunality: Strasbourg Eurométropole

Government
  - Mayor (2023–2026): Alexandre Lorentz
- Area^{1}: 1.72 km^{2} (0.66 sq mi)
- Highest elevation: 192 m (630 ft)
- Lowest elevation: 144 m (472 ft)
- Population (2023): 2,188
  - Density: 1,270/km^{2} (3,290/sq mi)
- Time zone: UTC+01:00 (CET)
  - Summer (DST): UTC+02:00 (CEST)
- INSEE/Postal code: 67296 /67206
- ^{1} French Land Register data, which excludes lakes, ponds, glaciers > 1 km^{2} (0.386 sq mi or 247 acres) and river estuaries.

Mittelhausbergen (French: [mitœlawsbɛʁɡœn], German: [ˈmɪtl̩haʊsˌbɛʁɡn̩]; Alsatian: Míttelhüsbàrje [mɪd̥əlhysˈb̥aʁjə]) is a commune in the Bas-Rhin department in Grand Est in north-eastern France.

== Population ==
Historical population
Year	Pop.	±% p.a.
1968	504	—
1975	852	+7.79%
1982	1,169	+4.62%
1990	1,425	+2.51%
1999	1,680	+1.85%
2007	1,750	+0.51%
2012	1,768	+0.20%
2017	1,984	+2.33%
2023	2,188	+1.64%
Source: INSEE

== See also ==
- Communes of the Bas-Rhin department
