= Osthoffen =

Osthoffen Oschthoffe
- Commune
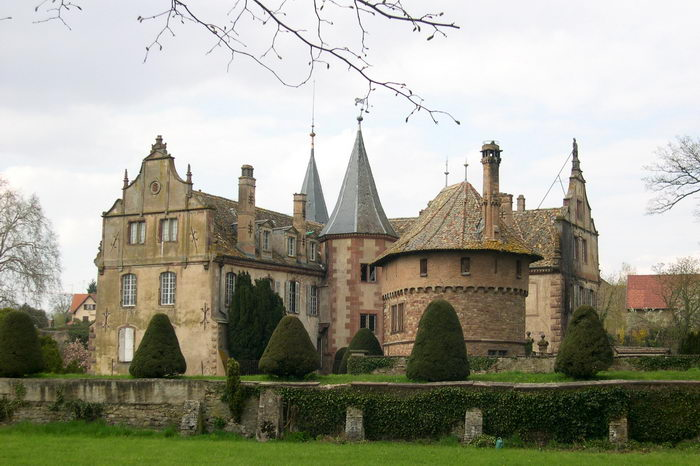
- The castle in Osthoffen

- Coat of arms
- Location of Osthoffen
- Location within France Location within Grand Est
- Coordinates: 48°35′13″N 7°33′21″E
- Country: France
- Region: Grand Est
- Department: Bas-Rhin
- Arrondissement: Strasbourg
- Canton: Lingolsheim
- Intercommunality: Strasbourg Eurométropole

Government
  - Mayor (2020–2026): Wilfrid De Vreese
- Area^{1}: 5.11 km^{2} (1.97 sq mi)
- Highest elevation: 227 m (745 ft)
- Lowest elevation: 159 m (522 ft)
- Population (2023): 815
  - Density: 159/km^{2} (413/sq mi)
- Time zone: UTC+01:00 (CET)
  - Summer (DST): UTC+02:00 (CEST)
- INSEE/Postal code: 67363 /67990
- ^{1} French Land Register data, which excludes lakes, ponds, glaciers > 1 km^{2} (0.386 sq mi or 247 acres) and river estuaries.

Osthoffen (French pronunciation: [ɔstofən]; German: Osthofen; Alsatian: Oschthoffe) is a commune in the Bas-Rhin department in Grand Est in north-eastern France.

== See also ==
- Communes of the Bas-Rhin department
