= Geispolsheim =

Geispolsheim Gäispítze
- Commune
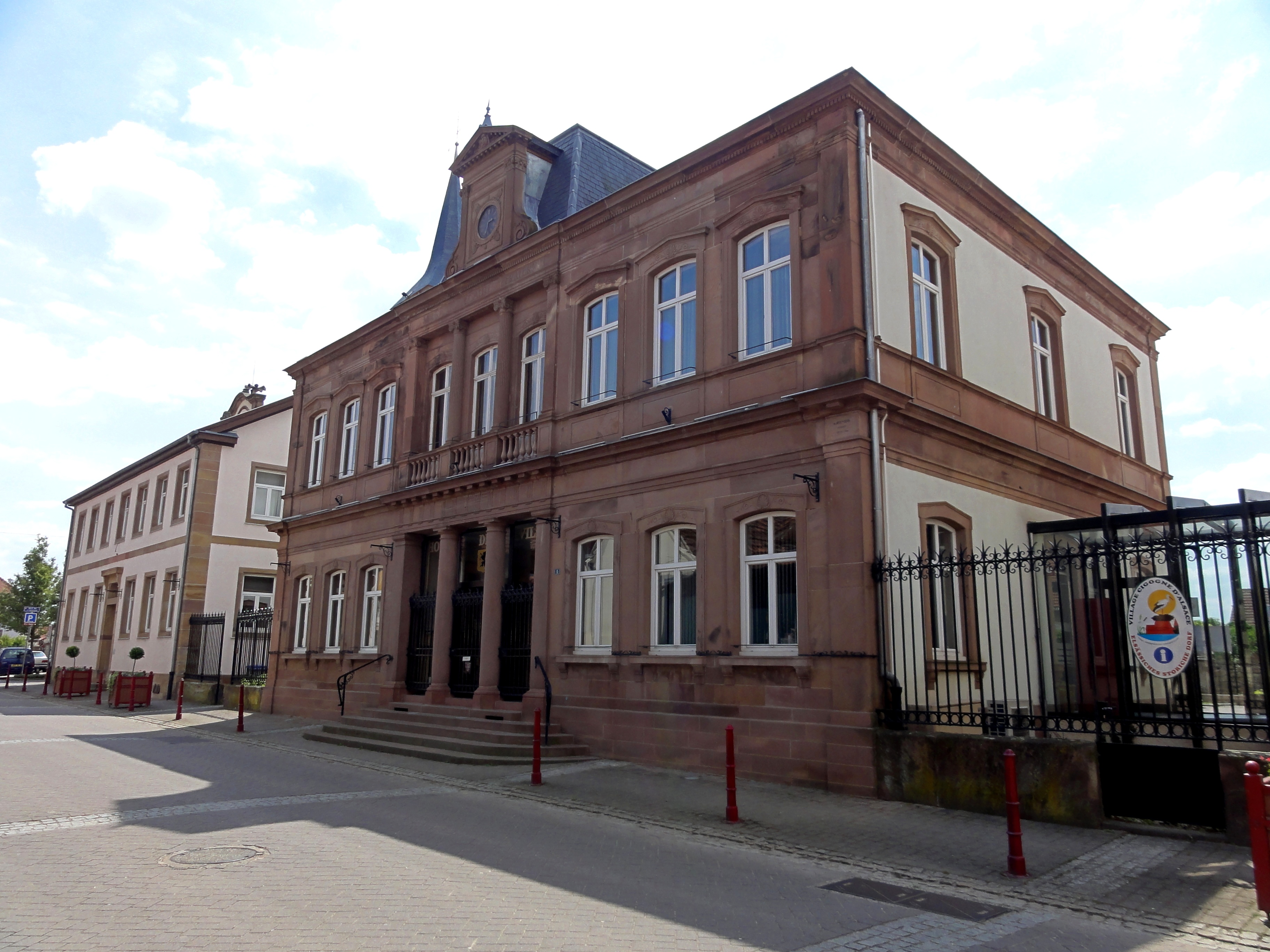
- The town hall in Geispolsheim

- Coat of arms
- Location of Geispolsheim
- Location within France Location within Grand Est
- Coordinates: 48°31′N 7°39′E
- Country: France
- Region: Grand Est
- Department: Bas-Rhin
- Arrondissement: Strasbourg
- Canton: Lingolsheim
- Intercommunality: Strasbourg Eurométropole

Government
  - Mayor (2020–2026): Jean-Michel Schaeffer
- Area^{1}: 21.95 km^{2} (8.47 sq mi)
- Highest elevation: 155 m (509 ft)
- Lowest elevation: 139 m (456 ft)
- Population (2023): 7,919
  - Density: 360.8/km^{2} (934.4/sq mi)
- Time zone: UTC+01:00 (CET)
  - Summer (DST): UTC+02:00 (CEST)
- INSEE/Postal code: 67152 /67118
- ^{1} French Land Register data, which excludes lakes, ponds, glaciers > 1 km^{2} (0.386 sq mi or 247 acres) and river estuaries.

Geispolsheim (French pronunciation: [ɡaispɔlsaim]; Alsatian: Gaispítze) is a commune in the Bas-Rhin department in Grand Est in north-eastern France.

== Geography ==
Geispolsheim is located 12 kilometres (7 mi) to the south of Strasbourg. Geispolsheim is situated entirely on the plain of Alsace.

The construction of a railway between Strasbourg and Mulhouse involved the building in 1841 of a station approximately 3 kilometres (2 mi) to the east of the traditional village, and the development of a separate, but still dependent, settlement called Geispolsheim-Gare. The traditional village, which contains most of the services (town hall, college, associations, etc.), is often referred to unofficially as Geispolsheim-Village, for convenience. The two parts of the town are linked by the departmental road RD84.

Today included in the Strasbourg Eurométropole, Geispolsheim already offers significant local employment and commercial opportunities in its industrial and artisanal zones.

== Population ==
Historical population
Year	Pop.	±% p.a.
1968	3,758	—
1975	4,625	+3.01%
1982	4,712	+0.27%
1990	5,546	+2.06%
1999	7,031	+2.67%
2007	7,067	+0.06%
2012	7,124	+0.16%
2017	7,540	+1.14%
2023	7,919	+0.82%
Source: INSEE

== History ==
Geispolsheim was first mentioned in 871 in a document citing lands belonging to the bishop of Strasbourg.

In the 14th century, Geispolsheim became a fortified town. Despite an effective defense system, the village was not spared by the many wars of the Middle Ages: invasions by the English in 1365, the Armagnacs in 1439 and 1444, the Lorrains in 1587 during the Bishops' War, Mansfeld's troops and the Swedes during the Thirty Years' War (1618-1648) reduced the village to ashes time and time again, causing many casualties.

On November 5, 1793, seven inhabitants of Geispolsheim - mayor François-Jacques Nuss and six deputies - were guillotined in Strasbourg during the Reign of Terror. They had been condemned as counter-revolutionaries.

On January 3, 1868, a major fire destroyed most of Rue Charles-de-Wendel and the Rue Ziegler district.

== Local culture ==
=== Feast of Corpus Christi ===
Every year, a large procession takes place in the village on Corpus Christi. It's one of the last great traditional religious processions in Alsace. The Swiss Guard leads the way, followed by little girls in white and green shepherdess costumes, holding a lily or lamb and throwing flower petals. The procession then includes the town band, the Sainte-Cécile choir, and young men and women in traditional costume carrying the church statues. The firemen surround the village priest, who walks under the canopy.

=== Sauerkraut festival ===
The main cabbage-growing and sauerkraut-making region lies to the south-west of Strasbourg, around Geispolsheim and Krautergersheim.

In 1966, the parish priest of Geispolsheim organized a sauerkraut festival (fête de la choucroute in Franch) to raise funds for the renovation of Sainte-Marguerite church, and later for the construction of a village hall. Since then, village associations have mobilized every year on the last Sunday in August to ensure the success of this festival, which attracts some 10,000 visitors.

The public is invited to taste the local sauerkraut at lunchtime or in the evening. Over 1,000 meals are served, representing 800 kg of sauerkraut and 400 kg of meat. The day begins at 6 a.m. with a large flea market in the main streets of the village. You can also visit an exhibition of craftsmen and artists, before listening to an aperitif concert by the municipal band. Several farmyards are open to the public, showcasing old trades, farm animals, arboriculture and artists' work. The highlight of the festival is the grand procession on the theme of "Geispolsheim in days gone by", with the participation of folklore groups, music, sumptuous floats and carriages, and local residents in their traditional costumes. The festival continues with entertainment in the streets, and may end with a sauerkraut meal.

== See also ==
- Communes of the Bas-Rhin department
