= Hangenbieten =

Hangenbieten Hàngebiete
- Commune
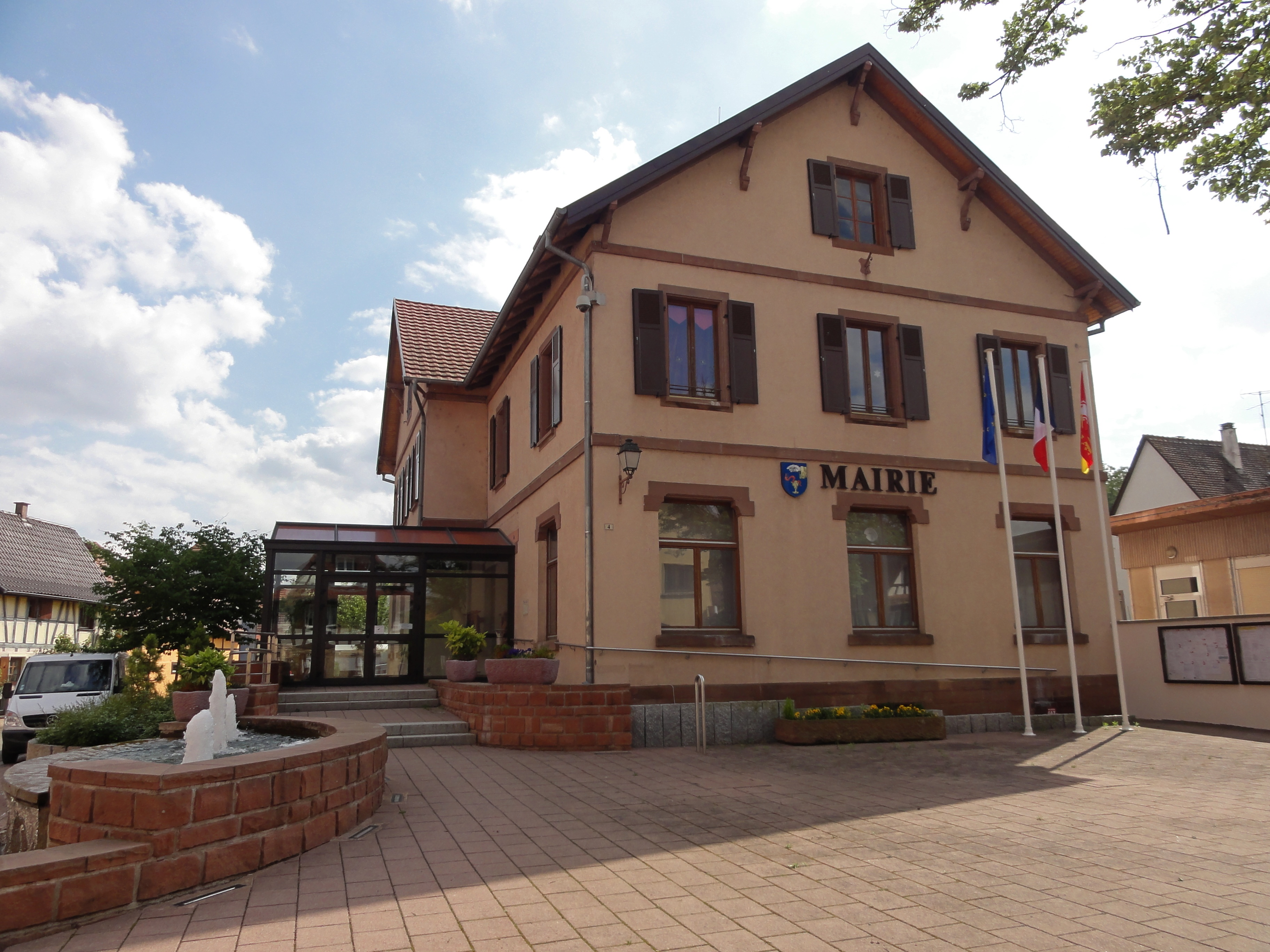
- The town hall in Hangenbieten

- Coat of arms
- Location of Hangenbieten
- Location within France Location within Grand Est
- Coordinates: 48°33′35″N 7°36′52″E
- Country: France
- Region: Grand Est
- Department: Bas-Rhin
- Arrondissement: Strasbourg
- Canton: Lingolsheim
- Intercommunality: Strasbourg Eurométropole

Government
  - Mayor (2020–2026): Laurent Ulrich
- Area^{1}: 4.11 km^{2} (1.59 sq mi)
- Highest elevation: 209 m (686 ft)
- Lowest elevation: 147 m (482 ft)
- Population (2023): 1,822
  - Density: 443/km^{2} (1,150/sq mi)
- Time zone: UTC+01:00 (CET)
  - Summer (DST): UTC+02:00 (CEST)
- INSEE/Postal code: 67182 /67980
- ^{1} French Land Register data, which excludes lakes, ponds, glaciers > 1 km^{2} (0.386 sq mi or 247 acres) and river estuaries.

Hangenbieten is a commune in the Bas-Rhin department and Grand Est region of north-eastern France.

The name is a contraction of the former Hangenbietenheim.

== Geography ==
Hangenbieten lies 2 km north of Strasbourg Airport and 10 km west of central Strasbourg. The village is traversed by the Canal de la Bruche, built by Vauban following King Louis XIV of France's annexation of the Prince-Bishopric of Strasbourg in 1681. The canal connects Strasbourg to Molsheim and is followed by a cycle path.

== See also ==
- Communes of the Bas-Rhin department
