= Holtzheim =

Holtzheim Holze
- Commune
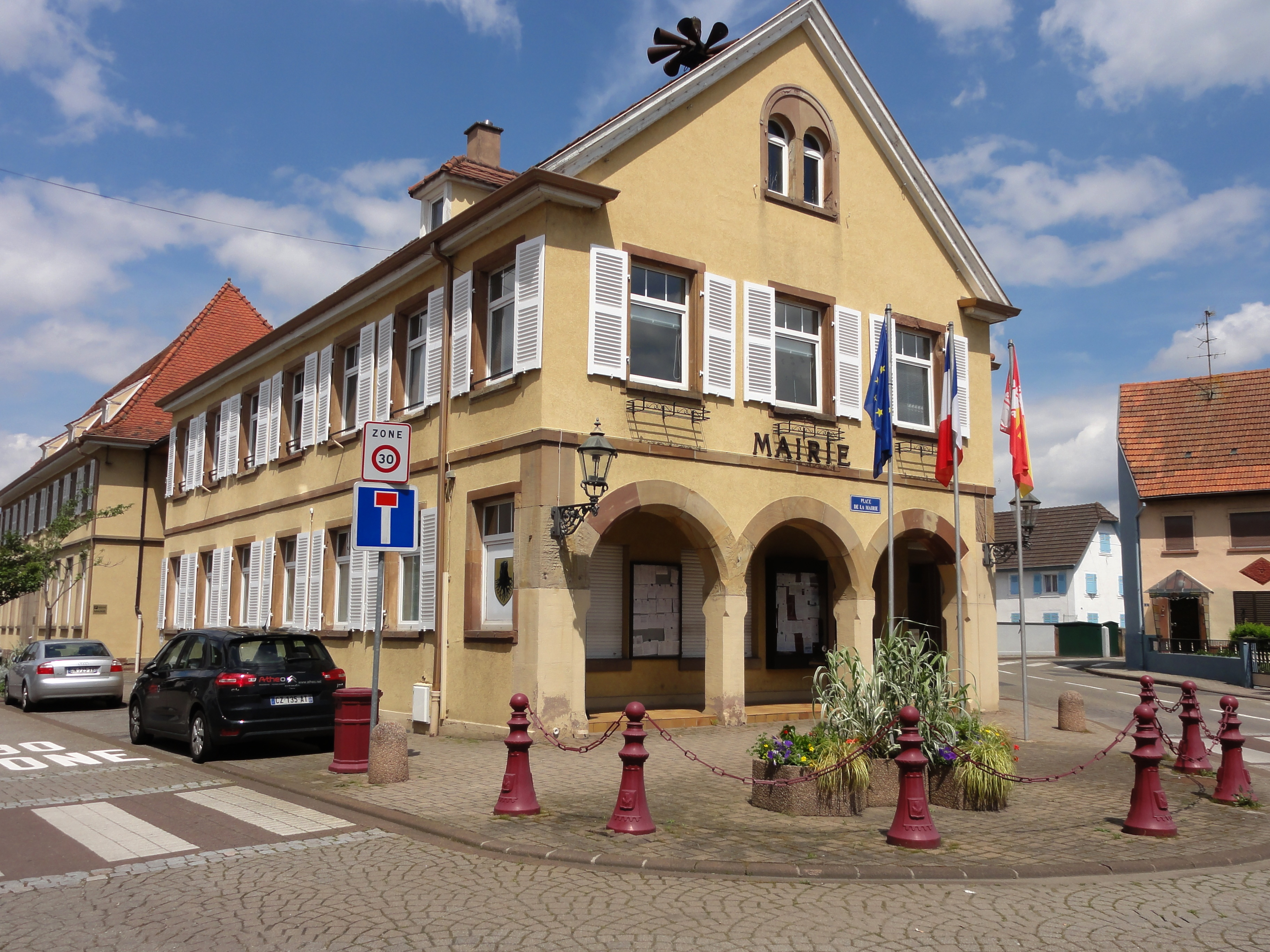
- The town hall in Holtzheim

- Coat of arms
- Location of Holtzheim
- Location within France Location within Grand Est
- Coordinates: 48°33′34″N 7°38′30″E
- Country: France
- Region: Grand Est
- Department: Bas-Rhin
- Arrondissement: Strasbourg
- Canton: Lingolsheim
- Intercommunality: Strasbourg Eurométropole

Government
  - Mayor (2020–2026): Pia Imbs
- Area^{1}: 6.91 km^{2} (2.67 sq mi)
- Highest elevation: 153 m (502 ft)
- Lowest elevation: 143 m (469 ft)
- Population (2023): 3,850
  - Density: 557/km^{2} (1,440/sq mi)
- Time zone: UTC+01:00 (CET)
  - Summer (DST): UTC+02:00 (CEST)
- INSEE/Postal code: 67212 /67810
- ^{1} French Land Register data, which excludes lakes, ponds, glaciers > 1 km^{2} (0.386 sq mi or 247 acres) and river estuaries.

Holtzheim (French pronunciation: [ɔltsaim]; German: Holzheim; Alsatian: Holze) is a commune in the Bas-Rhin department in Grand Est in north-eastern France. The village is surrounded by farmland and thereby separated from the Strasbourg conurbation: however, Strasbourg airport is less than two kilometres away to the south. The little river Bruche runs through the heart of the Holtzheim.

== Population ==
Historical population
Year	Pop.	±% p.a.
1968	1,922	—
1975	2,097	+1.25%
1982	2,082	−0.10%
1990	2,292	+1.21%
1999	2,750	+2.04%
2007	3,006	+1.12%
2012	3,394	+2.46%
2017	3,656	+1.50%
2023	3,850	+0.87%
Source: INSEE

== See also ==
- Communes of the Bas-Rhin department
