= Lipsheim =

Lipsheim Lipse
- Commune
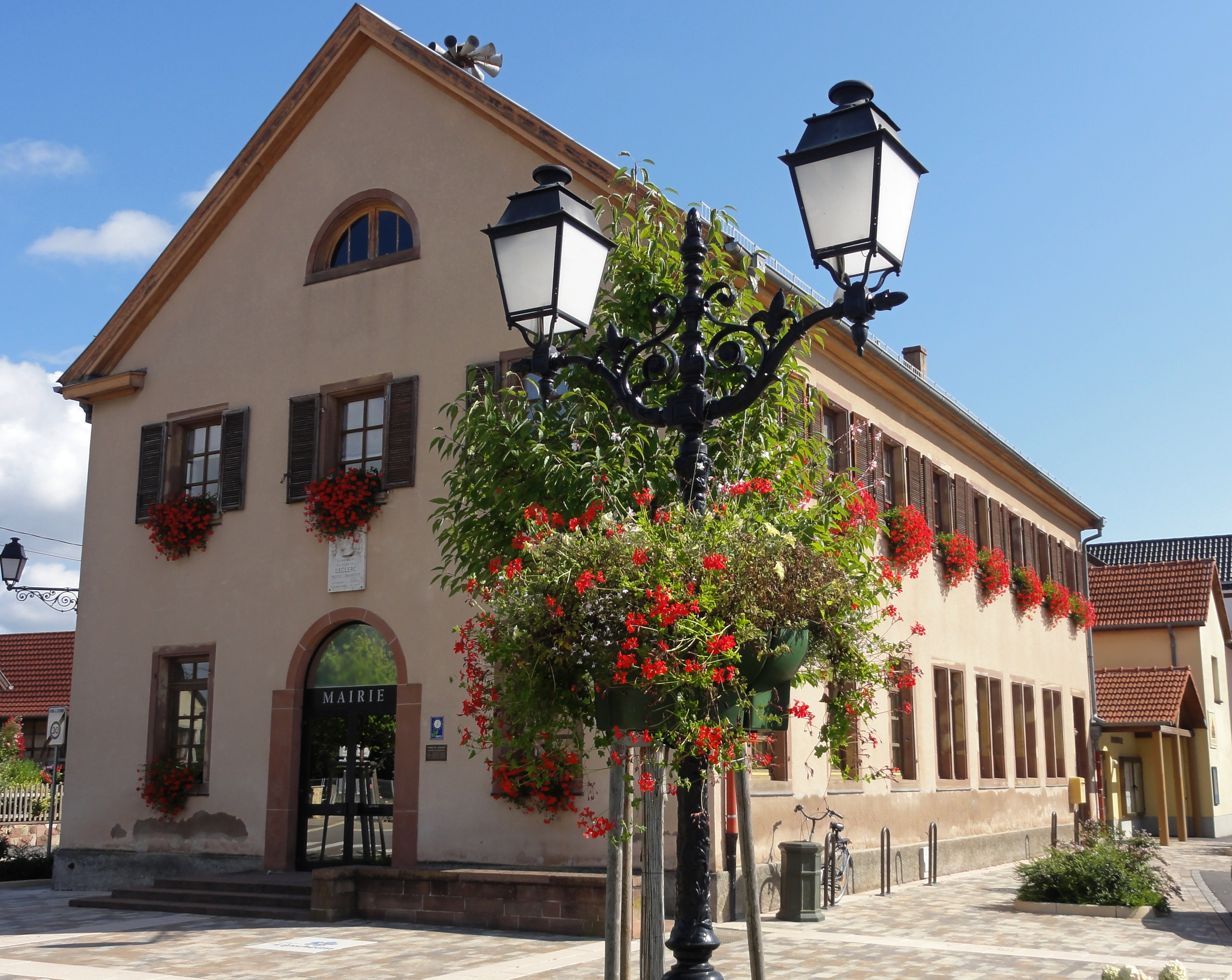
- The town hall in Lipsheim
- Location of Lipsheim
- Location within France Location within Grand Est
- Coordinates: 48°29′32″N 7°40′00″E
- Country: France
- Region: Grand Est
- Department: Bas-Rhin
- Arrondissement: Strasbourg
- Canton: Lingolsheim
- Intercommunality: Strasbourg Eurométropole

Government
  - Mayor (2020–2026): René Schaal
- Area^{1}: 4.96 km^{2} (1.92 sq mi)
- Highest elevation: 150 m (490 ft)
- Lowest elevation: 146 m (479 ft)
- Population (2023): 2,702
  - Density: 545/km^{2} (1,410/sq mi)
- Time zone: UTC+01:00 (CET)
  - Summer (DST): UTC+02:00 (CEST)
- INSEE/Postal code: 67268 /67640
- ^{1} French Land Register data, which excludes lakes, ponds, glaciers > 1 km^{2} (0.386 sq mi or 247 acres) and river estuaries.

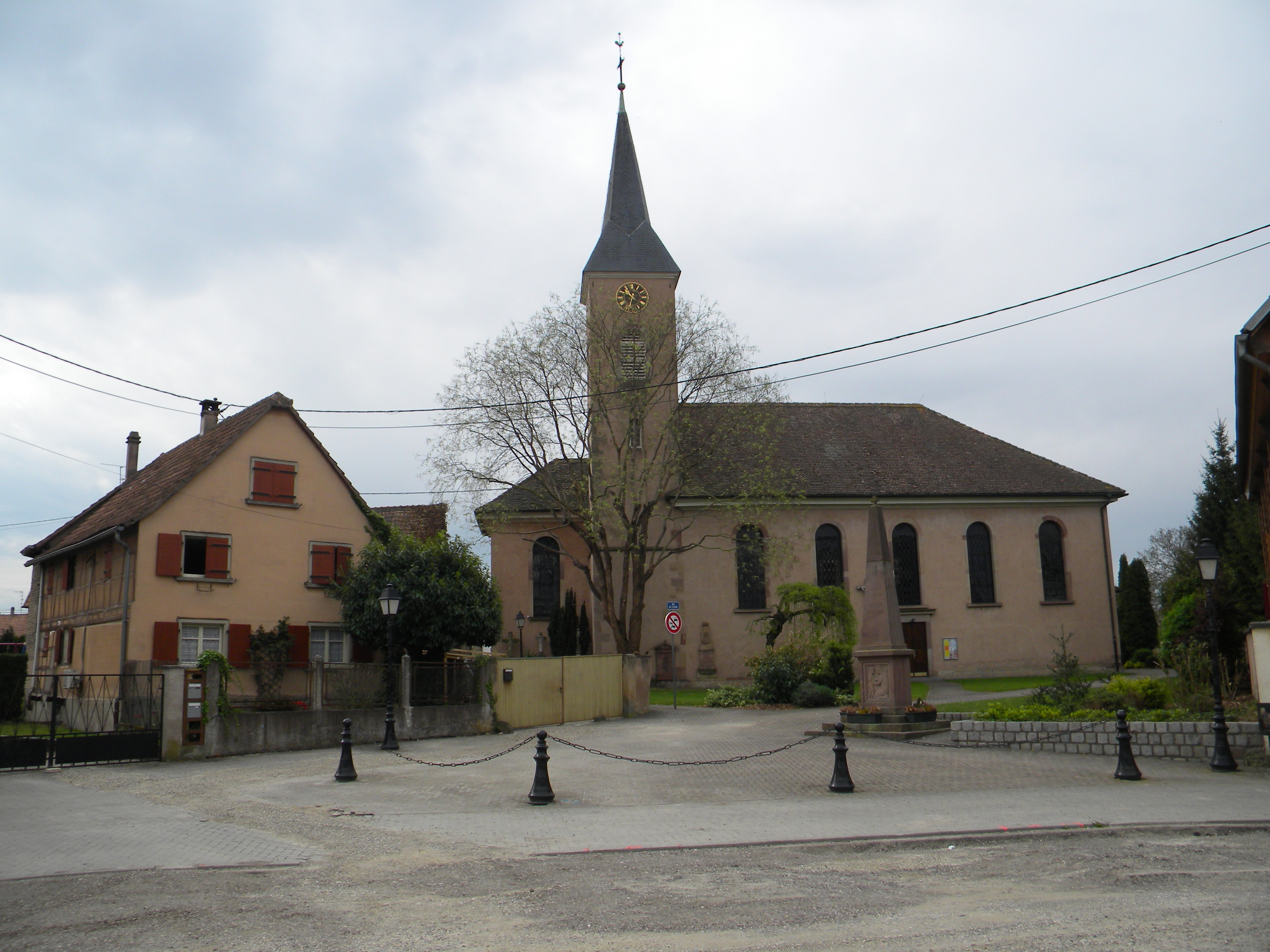

Lipsheim (French pronunciation: [lipsaim]) is a commune in the Bas-Rhin department in Grand Est in north-eastern France.

== Population ==
Historical population
Year	Pop.	±% p.a.
1968	1,012	—
1975	1,440	+5.17%
1982	1,548	+1.04%
1990	1,772	+1.70%
1999	2,268	+2.78%
2007	2,484	+1.14%
2012	2,489	+0.04%
2017	2,600	+0.88%
2023	2,702	+0.64%
Source: INSEE

== See also ==
- Communes of the Bas-Rhin department
