= Château de Breuschwickersheim =

Château in Bas-Rhin, Alsace, France

Coordinates: 48°34′44″N 7°36′17″E

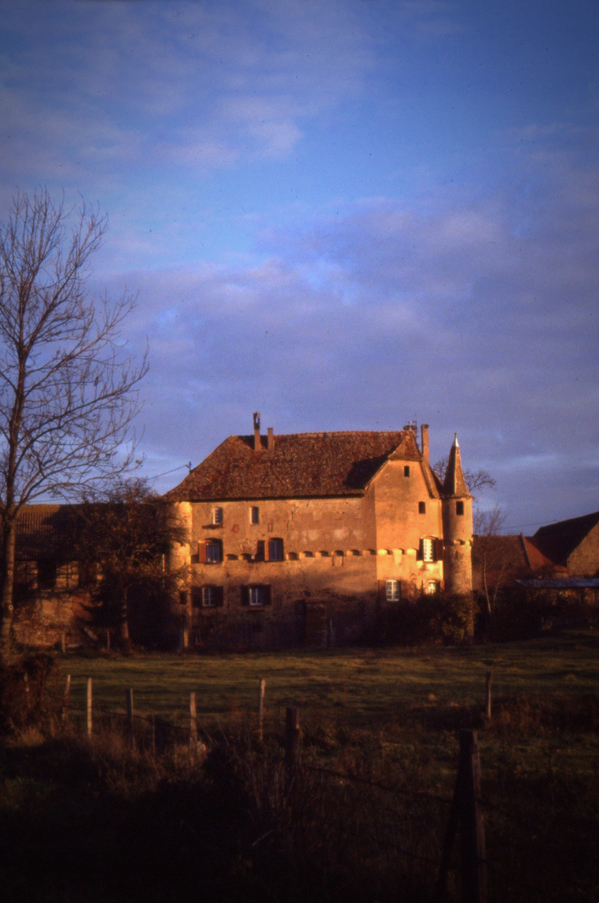
Château de Breuschwickersheim

The Château de Breuschwickersheim is a château in Breuschwickersheim, Bas-Rhin, Alsace, France. It became a monument historique in 1929.
