= Arrondissement of Strasbourg-Ville =

Coordinates: 48.58°N 7.75°E

Strasbourg-Ville
- Former arrondissement
- Location within the former region Alsace
- Country: France
- Region: Grand Est
- Department: Bas-Rhin
- No. of communes: {{{nbcomm}}}
- Disbanded: 2015
- Area: 78 km^{2} (30 sq mi)
- Population (2012): 274,394
  - Density: 3,500/km^{2} (9,100/sq mi)

The arrondissement of Strasbourg-Ville is a former arrondissement of France in the Bas-Rhin department in the Alsace region. In 2015 it was merged into the new arrondissement of Strasbourg. It had 1 commune, and its population was 274,394 (2012).

== Composition ==
The only commune of the arrondissement of Strasbourg-Ville was Strasbourg (INSEE code 67482).

== History ==
The arrondissement of Strasbourg-Ville was created in 1919. It was disbanded in 2015. As a result of the reorganisation of the cantons of France which came into effect in 2015, the borders of the cantons are no longer related to the borders of the arrondissements. The cantons of the arrondissement of Strasbourg-Ville were, as of January 2015:

1. Strasbourg 1st Canton
2. Strasbourg 2nd Canton
3. Strasbourg 3rd Canton
4. Strasbourg 4th Canton
5. Strasbourg 5th Canton
6. Strasbourg 6th Canton
7. Strasbourg 7th Canton
8. Strasbourg 8th Canton
9. Strasbourg 9th Canton
10. Strasbourg 10th Canton
