= Mundolsheim =

Mundolsheim Mundelse (Alsatian)
- Commune
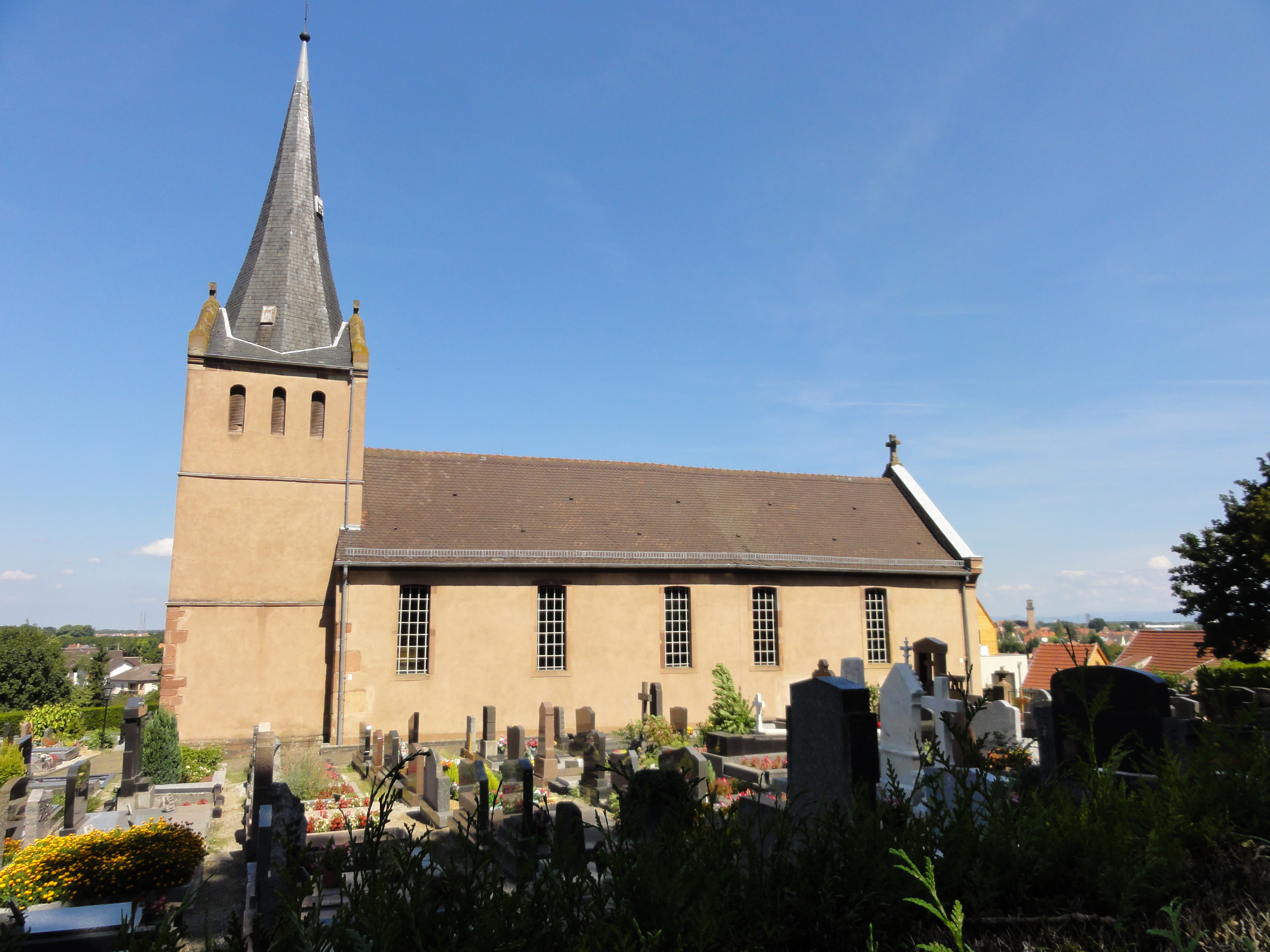
- The Protestant church in Mundolsheim

- Coat of arms
- Location of Mundolsheim
- Location within France Location within Grand Est
- Coordinates: 48°38′40″N 7°42′54″E
- Country: France
- Region: Grand Est
- Department: Bas-Rhin
- Arrondissement: Strasbourg
- Canton: Hœnheim
- Intercommunality: Strasbourg Eurométropole

Government
  - Mayor (2020–2026): Béatrice Bulou
- Area^{1}: 4.2 km^{2} (1.6 sq mi)
- Highest elevation: 184 m (604 ft)
- Lowest elevation: 137 m (449 ft)
- Population (2023): 5,322
  - Density: 1,300/km^{2} (3,300/sq mi)
- Time zone: UTC+01:00 (CET)
  - Summer (DST): UTC+02:00 (CEST)
- INSEE/Postal code: 67309 /67450
- ^{1} French Land Register data, which excludes lakes, ponds, glaciers > 1 km^{2} (0.386 sq mi or 247 acres) and river estuaries.

Mundolsheim (French pronunciation: [mundɔlsajm]; Alsatian: Mundelse) is a commune in the Bas-Rhin department in Grand Est in north-eastern France.

== Population ==
Historical population
Year	Pop.	±% p.a.
1968	3,226	—
1975	3,545	+1.36%
1982	3,343	−0.83%
1990	4,698	+4.35%
1999	5,270	+1.28%
2007	5,062	−0.50%
2012	4,878	−0.74%
2017	4,731	−0.61%
2023	5,322	+1.98%
Source: INSEE

== See also ==
- Communes of the Bas-Rhin department
