= Breuschwickersheim =

Breuschwickersheim Wickersche
- Commune
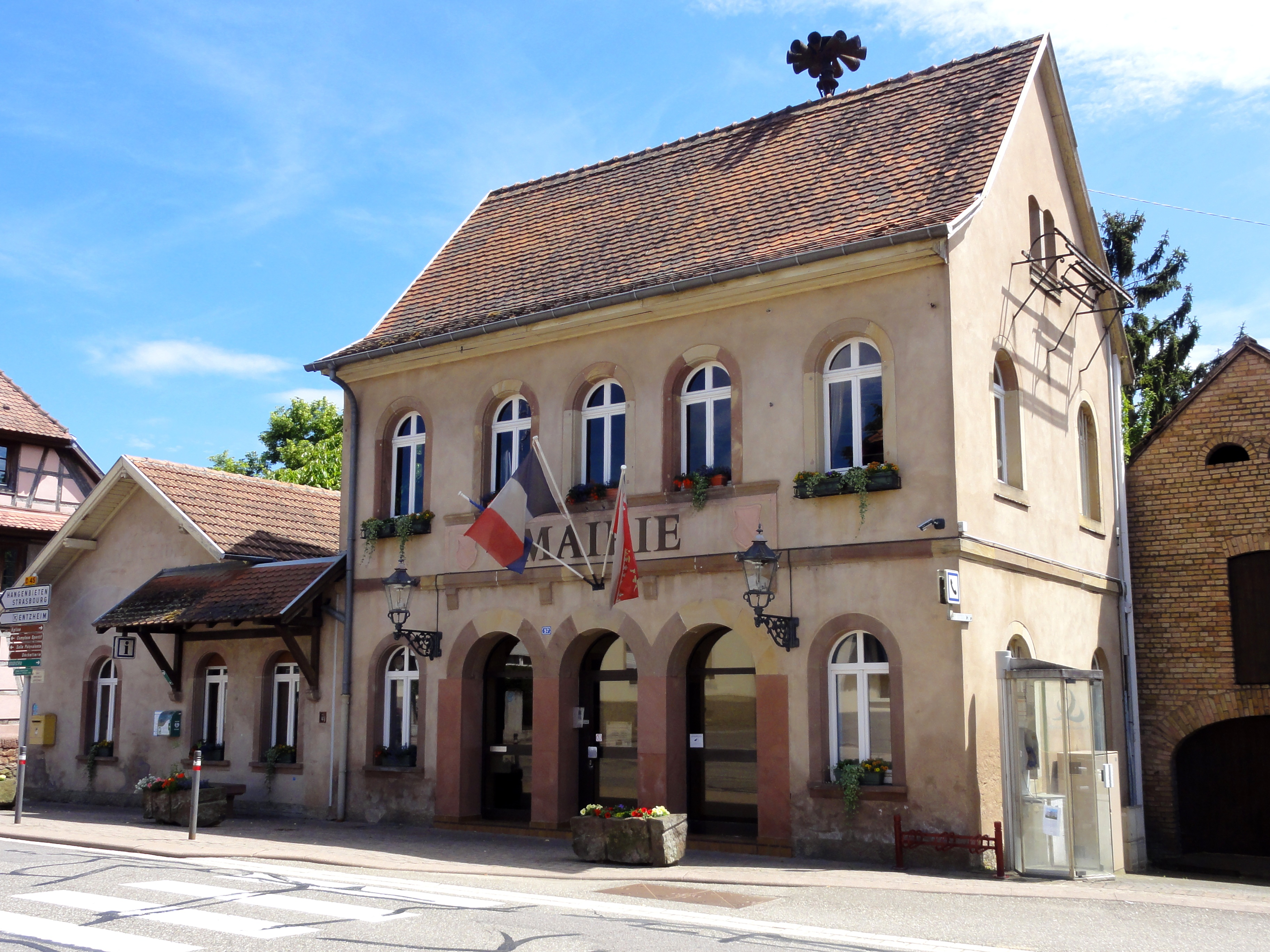
- The town hall in Breuschwickersheim

- Coat of arms
- Location of Breuschwickersheim
- Location within France Location within Grand Est
- Coordinates: 48°34′50″N 7°36′09″E
- Country: France
- Region: Grand Est
- Department: Bas-Rhin
- Arrondissement: Strasbourg
- Canton: Lingolsheim
- Intercommunality: Strasbourg Eurométropole

Government
  - Mayor (2020–2026): Doris Ternoy
- Area^{1}: 5.06 km^{2} (1.95 sq mi)
- Highest elevation: 211 m (692 ft)
- Lowest elevation: 153 m (502 ft)
- Population (2023): 1,344
  - Density: 266/km^{2} (688/sq mi)
- Time zone: UTC+01:00 (CET)
  - Summer (DST): UTC+02:00 (CEST)
- INSEE/Postal code: 67065 /67112
- ^{1} French Land Register data, which excludes lakes, ponds, glaciers > 1 km^{2} (0.386 sq mi or 247 acres) and river estuaries.

Breuschwickersheim is a commune in the Bas-Rhin department and Grand Est region of north-eastern France.

The Château de Breuschwickersheim is situated here.

== See also ==
- Communes of the Bas-Rhin department
