= Wolxheim =

- Commune
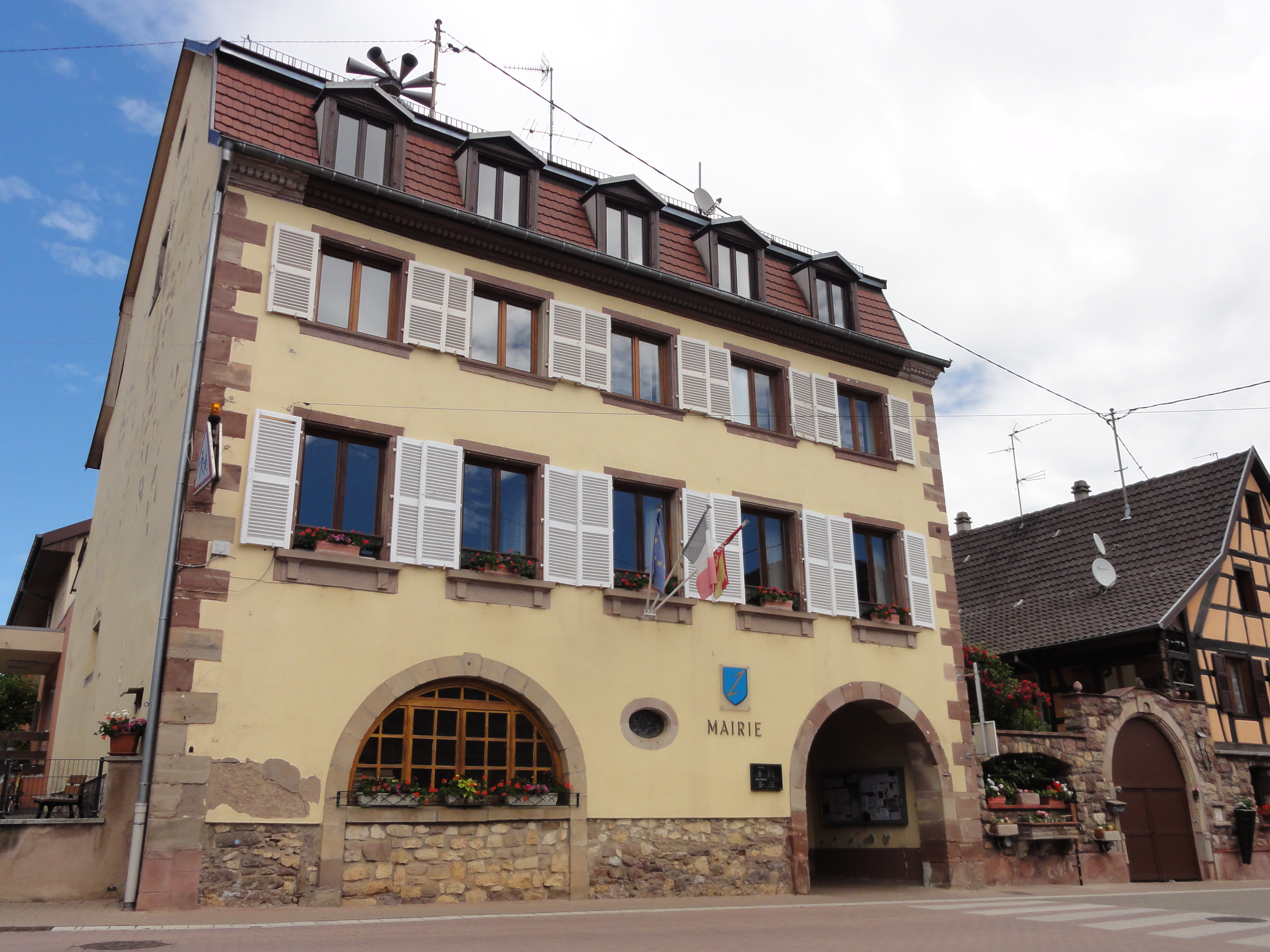
- The town hall in Wolxheim

- Coat of arms
- Location of Wolxheim
- Location within France Location within Grand Est
- Coordinates: 48°34′10″N 7°30′50″E
- Country: France
- Region: Grand Est
- Department: Bas-Rhin
- Arrondissement: Molsheim
- Canton: Molsheim
- Intercommunality: Région de Molsheim-Mutzig

Government
  - Mayor (2020–2026): Adrien Kiffel
- Area^{1}: 2.92 km^{2} (1.13 sq mi)
- Highest elevation: 273 m (896 ft)
- Lowest elevation: 163 m (535 ft)
- Population (2023): 961
  - Density: 329/km^{2} (852/sq mi)
- Time zone: UTC+01:00 (CET)
  - Summer (DST): UTC+02:00 (CEST)
- INSEE/Postal code: 67554 /67120
- ^{1} French Land Register data, which excludes lakes, ponds, glaciers > 1 km^{2} (0.386 sq mi or 247 acres) and river estuaries.

Wolxheim (French pronunciation: [wɔlksaim]; Alsatian: Wolixe) is a commune in the Bas-Rhin department in Grand Est in north-eastern France.

== Population ==
Historical population
Year	Pop.	±% p.a.
1968	670	—
1975	793	+2.44%
1982	775	−0.33%
1990	795	+0.32%
1999	774	−0.30%
2007	865	+1.40%
2012	880	+0.34%
2017	963	+1.82%
2023	961	−0.03%
Source: INSEE

== See also ==
- Communes of the Bas-Rhin department
