= Soultz-les-Bains =

- Commune
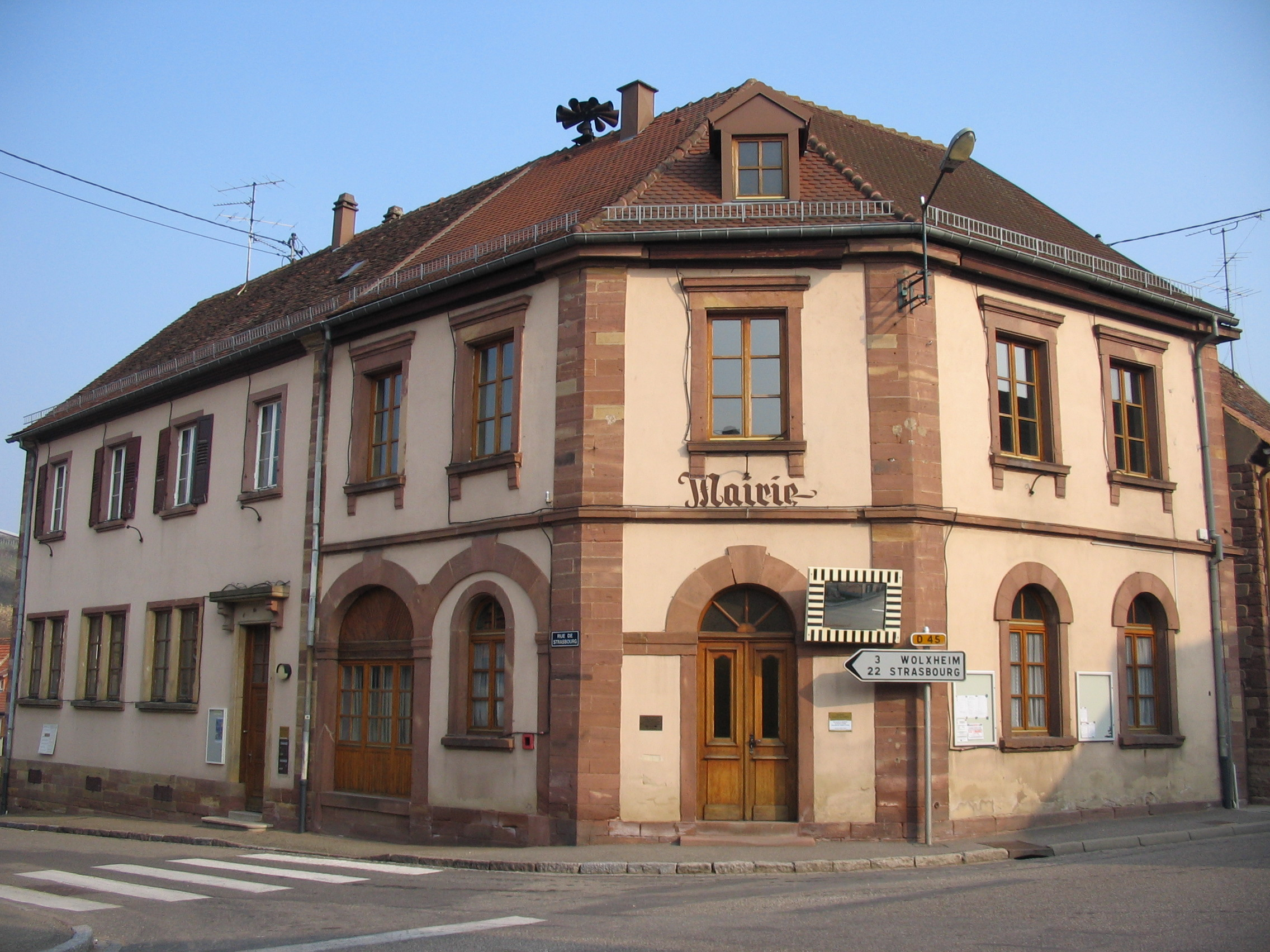
- The town hall in Soultz-les-Bains

- Coat of arms
- Location of Soultz-les-Bains
- Location within France Location within Grand Est
- Coordinates: 48°34′20″N 7°29′18″E
- Country: France
- Region: Grand Est
- Department: Bas-Rhin
- Arrondissement: Molsheim
- Canton: Molsheim

Government
  - Mayor (2020–2026): Guy Schmitt
- Area^{1}: 3.55 km^{2} (1.37 sq mi)
- Highest elevation: 359 m (1,178 ft)
- Lowest elevation: 166 m (545 ft)
- Population (2023): 942
  - Density: 265/km^{2} (687/sq mi)
- Time zone: UTC+01:00 (CET)
  - Summer (DST): UTC+02:00 (CEST)
- INSEE/Postal code: 67473 /67120
- ^{1} French Land Register data, which excludes lakes, ponds, glaciers > 1 km^{2} (0.386 sq mi or 247 acres) and river estuaries.

Soultz-les-Bains (French pronunciation: [sult͡s le bɛ̃]; historical German: Sulzbad, pronounced [zʊlt͡s.baːt]) is a commune in the Bas-Rhin department in Grand Est, France.

In 1682, the famous military engineer Vauban constructed the Canal de la Bruche between Soultz and Strasbourg. The canal was needed in order to transport sandstone from the quarries of Soultz for use in his fortification of Strasbourg. The canal carried its last commercial load in 1939 and was formally closed in 1957.

== See also ==
- Église Saint-Maurice, Soultz-les-Bains
- Communes of the Bas-Rhin department
