= 2020 Bas-Rhin municipal elections =

- 15 March 2020 and 28 June 2020

The 2020 Bas-Rhin municipal elections took place on 15 March 2020, with a second round of voting initially expected for 22 March 2020. Like the rest of France, the second round was initially suspended due to the COVID-19 pandemic. On 22 May, Prime Minister Édouard Philippe announced that the second round of voting would take place on 28 June.

== Incumbent and elected mayors ==
Right-wing politicians have remained largely dominant in the department. Already weakened during the last elections by losses in Schweighouse-sur-Moder, Vendenheim and Schiltigheim. The left lost further ground in Erstein, Illkirch-Graffenstaden and Ostwald to the benefit of centrist and unaffiliated candidates. Even with divisions in her list during the second round of voting, Jeanne Baseghian, the mayoral candidate for Europe Écologie Les Verts, was able to maintain control of Strasbourg for the left.

Commune	Population (2017)	Incumbent mayor	Party	Elected mayor	Party
Barr	7 238	Gilbert Scholly	LR	Nathalie Ernst	LR
Benfeld	5 753	Jacky Wolfarth	DVD	Jacky Wolfarth	DVD
Bischheim	17 093	Jean-Louis Hoerlé	LR	Jean-Louis Hoerlé	LR
Bischwiller	12 538	Jean-Lucien Netzer	MoDem	Jean-Lucien Netzer	MoDem
Brumath	9 986	Étienne Wolf	LR	Étienne Wolf	LR
Drusenheim	5 154	Jacky Keller	LR	Jacky Keller	LR
Eckbolsheim	6 857	André Lobstein	LR	André Lobstein	LR
Erstein	10 630	Jean-Marc Willer	DVG	Michel Andreu Sanchez	LR
Eschau	5 303	Yves Sublon	DVD	Yves Sublon	DVD
Fegersheim	5 737	Thierry Schaal	DVD	Thierry Schaal	DVD
Geispolsheim	7 540	Sébastien Zaegel	LR	Jean-Michel Schaeffer	DVD
Haguenau	34 504	Claude Sturni	DVD	Claude Sturni	DVD
Hœnheim	11 215	Vincent Debes	LR	Vincent Debes	LR
Illkirch-Graffenstaden	26 780	Claude Froehly	PS	Thibaud Phillips	LR
Lingolsheim	18 324	Yves Bur	LR	Catherine Graef-Eckert	LR
Molsheim	9 312	Jean-Michel Weber	LR	Laurent Furst	LR
Mutzig	6 011	Jean-Luc Schickelé	DVD	Jean-Luc Schickelé	DVD
Oberhausbergen	5 381	Cécile Delattre	UDI	Cécile Delattre	UDI
Obernai	11 279	Bernard Fischer	LR	Bernard Fischer	LR
Ostwald	12 604	Jean-Marie Beutel	PS	Fabienne Baas	ECO
Val-de-Moder	5 096	Jean-Denis Erdelin	DVD	Jean-Denis Erdelin	DVD
Reichshoffen	5 396	Hubert Walter	LR	Hubert Walter	LR
Rosheim	5 149	Michel Herr	UDI	Michel Herr	UDI
Saverne	11 239	Stéphane Leyenberger	LR	Stéphane Leyenberger	LR
Schiltigheim	31 894	Danielle Dambach	EÉLV	Danielle Dambach	EÉLV
Sélestat	19 252	Marcel Bauer	LR	Marcel Bauer	LR
Souffelweyersheim	8 001	Pierre Perrin	UDI	Pierre Perrin	UDI
Strasbourg	280 966	Roland Ries	DVG	Jeanne Barseghian	EÉLV
Vendenheim	5 664	Philippe Pfrimmer	DVD	Philippe Pfrimmer	DVD
La Wantzenau	5 841	Patrick Depyl	MoDem	Michèle Kannengieser	DVD
Wasselonne	5 652	Michèle Eschlimann	LR	Michèle Eschlimann	LR
Wissembourg	7 537	Christian Gliech	LREM	Sandra Fischer-Junck	DVD

=== Results by number of mayors elected ===
Change in number of elected mayors by political party
Party	Incumbent mayors	Elected mayors	Change
EELV	1	2	+1
PS	2	0	-2
ECO	0	1	+1
DVG	2	0	-2
Total left	5	3	-2
MoDem	2	1	-1
LREM	1	0	-1
Total center	3	1	-2
LR	14	15	+1
UDI	3	3	=
DVD	7	10	+3
Total right	24	28	+4
Total	32	32	=

== Results in communes with more than 5,000 residents ==
=== Barr ===
- Incumbent mayor: Gilbert Scholly (LR)
- 29 seats to be elected to the conseil municipal (population in 2017: 7,238 residents)
- 12 seats to be elected to the conseil communautaire (CC du Pays de Barr)

2020 Barr municipal election results
Leader	List	First round		Seats	
Leader	List	Votes	%	CM	CC
Nathalie Ernst	LR	1,364	80.47	27	11
Pierre-Yves Zuber	RN	331	19.52	2	1
Valid votes		1,695	96.14		
White votes		22	1.25		
Rejected votes		46	2.61		
Total		1,763	100	29	12
Abstentions		2,830	61.62		
Registered voters - voter turnout		4,593	38.38		

=== Benfeld ===
- Incumbent mayor: Jacky Wolfarth (DVD)
- 29 seats to be elected to the conseil municipal (population in 2017: 5,753 residents)
- 6 seats to be elected to the conseil communautaire (CC du Canton d'Erstein)

2020 Benfeld municipal election results
Leader	List	First round		Seats	
Leader	List	Votes	%	CM	CC
Jacky Wolfart *	DVD	602	100.00	29	6
Valid votes		602	86.87		
White votes		45	6.49		
Rejected votes		46	6.64		
Total		693	100	29	6
Abstentions		3,131	81.83		
Registered voters - voter turnout		3,814	18.17		

=== Bischheim ===
- Incumbent mayor: Jean-Louis Hoerlé (LR)
- 33 seats to be elected to the conseil municipal (population in 2017: 17,093 residents)
- 3 seats to be elected to the conseil communautaire (Eurométropole de Strasbourg)

2020 Bischheim municipal election results
Leader	List	First round		Second round		Seats	
Leader	List	Votes	%	Votes	%	CM	CC
Jean-Louis Hoerlé *	LR	1,212	45.87	1,307	50.77	25	2
Gérard Schann	EELV	812	30.73	918	35.66	6	1
Christèle Laforêt	UDI	366	13.85	349	13.55	2	0
Estelle Fraass	PS	252	9.53			0	0
Valid votes		2,642	97.06	2,574	98.28		
White votes		27	0.99	23	0.88		
Rejected votes		53	1.95	22	0.84		
Total		2,722	100	2,619	100	33	3
Abstentions		6,309	69.86	6,416	71.01		
Registered voters - voter turnout		9,031	30.14	9,035	28.99		

=== Bischwiller ===
- Incumbent mayor: Jean-Lucien Netzer (MoDem)
- 33 seats to be elected to the conseil municipal (population in 2017: 12,538 residents)
- 8 seats to be elected to the conseil communautaire (CA de Haguenau)

2020 Bischwiller municipal election results
Leader	List	First round		Seats	
Leader	List	Votes	%	CM	CC
Jean-Lucien Netzer *	MoDem	1,971	84.23	31	8
Michèle Grunder-Rubert	ECO	369	15.76	3	0
Valid votes		2,340	96.42		
White votes		37	1,52		
Rejected votes		50	2.06		
Total		2,427	100	33	8
Abstentions		4,431	64.61		
Registered voters - voter turnout		6,858	35.39		

=== Brumath ===
- Incumbent mayor: Etienne Wolf (LR)
- 29 seats to be elected to the conseil municipal (population in 2017: 9,986 residents)
- 6 seats to be elected to the conseil communautaire (CA de Haguenau)

2020 Brumath municipal election results
Leader	List	First round		Seats	
Leader	List	Votes	%	CM	CC
Etienne Wolf *	LR	1,626	57.70	23	5
Jean Obrecht	DIV	991	35.16	5	1
Jean-Michel Delaye	DVG	201	7.13	1	0
Valid votes		2,818	97.37		
White votes		38	1.31		
Rejected votes		38	1.31		
Total		2,894	100	29	6
Abstentions		4,405	60.35		
Registered voters - voter turnout		7,299	39.65		

=== Drusenheim ===
- Incumbent mayor: Jacky Keller (LR)
- 29 seats to be elected to the conseil municipal (population in 2017: 5,154 residents)
- 6 seats to be elected to the conseil communautaire (CC du Pays Rhénan)

2020 Drusenheim municipal election results
Leader	List	First round		Seats	
Leader	List	Votes	%	CM	CC
Jacky Keller *	LR	1,040	100.00	29	6
Valid votes		1,040	85.67		
White votes		73	6.01		
Rejected votes		101	8.32		
Total		1,214	100	29	6
Abstentions		3,192	74.45		
Registered voters - voter turnout		4,406	27.55		

=== Eckbolsheim ===
- Incumbent mayor: André Lobstein (LR)
- 29 seats to be elected to the conseil municipal (population in 2017: 6,857 residents)
- 1 seats to be elected to the conseil communautaire (Eurométropole de Strasbourg)

2020 Eckbolsheim municipal election results
Leader	List	First round		Seats	
Leader	List	Votes	%	CM	CC
André Lobstein *	LR	691	100.00	29	1
Valid votes		691	82.56		
White votes		103	12.31		
Rejected votes		43	5.14		
Total		837	100	29	1
Abstentions		3,838	82.10		
Registered voters - voter turnout		4,675	17.90		

=== Erstein ===
- Incumbent mayor: Jean-Marc Willer (DVG)
- 33 seats to be elected to the conseil municipal (population in 2017: 10,630 residents)
- 11 seats to be elected to the conseil communautaire (CC du Canton d'Erstein)

2020 Erstein municipal election results
Leader	List	First round		Second round		Seats	
Leader	List	Votes	%	Votes	%	CM	CC
Michel Andreu Sanchez	LR	1,231	45.49	1,542	57.79	27	9
Patrick Kiefer	DVC	1,011	37.36	837	31.37	5	2
Kévin Diebold	RN	464	17.14	289	10.83	1	0
Valid votes		2,706	96.85	2,668	97.94		
White votes		47	1.68	29	1.06		
Rejected votes		41	1.47	27	0.99		
Total		2,794	100	2,724	100	33	11
Abstentions		4,982	64.07	5,070	65.05		
Registered voters - voter turnout		7,776	35.93	7,794	34.95		

=== Eschau ===
- Incumbent mayor: Yves Sublon (DVD)
- 29 seats to be elected to the conseil municipal (population in 2017: 5,303 residents)
- 1 seats to be elected to the conseil communautaire (Eurométropole de Strasbourg)

2020 Eschau municipal election results
Leader	List	First round		Seats	
Leader	List	Votes	%	CM	CC
Yves Sublon *	DVD	940	100.00	29	1
Valid votes		940	89.61		
White votes		45	4.29		
Rejected votes		64	6.10		
Total		1,049	100	29	1
Abstentions		2,808	72.80		
Registered voters - voter turnout		3,857	27.20		

=== Fegersheim ===
- Incumbent mayor: Thierry Schaal (DVD)
- 29 seats to be elected to the conseil municipal (population in 2017: 5,737 residents)
- 1 seats to be elected to the conseil communautaire (Eurométropole de Strasbourg )

2020 Fegersheim municipal election results
Leader	List	First round		Seats	
Leader	List	Votes	%	CM	CC
Thierry Schaal *	DVD	891	100	29	1
Valid votes		891	86.67		
White votes		71	6.91		
Rejected votes		66	6.42		
Total		1,028	100	29	1
Abstentions		3,296	76.23		
Registered voters - voter turnout		4,324	23.77		

=== Geispolsheim ===
- Incumbent mayor: Sébastien Zaegel (LR)
- 29 seats to be elected to the conseil municipal (population in 2017: 7,540 residents)
- 1 seats to be elected to the conseil communautaire (Eurométropole de Strasbourg)

2020 Geispolsheim municipal elections
Leader	List	First round		Seats	
Leader	List	Votes	%	CM	CC
Jean-Michel Schaeffer	DVD	1,544	72.93	25	1
Jacques Fernique	EELV	573	27.06	4	0
Valid votes		2,117	98.05		
White votes		24	1.11		
Rejected votes		18	0.83		
Total		2,159	100	29	1
Abstentions		3,394	61.12		
Registered voters - voter turnout		5,553	38.88		

=== Haguenau ===
- Incumbent mayor: Claude Sturni (DVD)
- 39 seats to be elected to the conseil municipal (population in 2017: 34,504 residents)
- 23 seats to be elected to the conseil communautaire (CA de Haguenau)

2020 Haguenau municipal election results
Leader	List	First round		Seats	
Leader	List	Votes	%	CM	CC
Claude Sturni *	DVD	4,379	65.71	33	20
Armand Marx	EELV	1,485	22.28	4	2
Patrick Muller	RN	800	12.00	2	1
Valid votes		6,664	97.73		
White votes		55	0.81		
Rejected votes		100	1.47		
Total		6,819	100	39	23
Abstentions		16,388	70.62		
Registered voters - voter turnout		23,207	29.38		

=== Hœnheim ===
- Incumbent mayor: Vincent Debes (LR)
- 33 seats to be elected to the conseil municipal (population in 2017: 11,215 residents)
- 2 seats to be elected to the conseil communautaire (Eurométropole de Strasbourg)

2020 Hœnheim municipal election results
Leader	List	First round		Seats	
Leader	List	Votes	%	CM	CC
Vincent Debes *	LR	1,965	100.00	33	2
Valid votes		1,965	93.00		
White votes		80	3.79		
Rejected votes		68	3.22		
Total		2,113	100	33	2
Abstentions		5,658	72.81		
Registered voters - voter turnout		7,771	27.19		

=== Illkirch-Graffenstaden ===
- Incumbent mayor: Claude Froehly (PS)
- 35 seats to be elected to the conseil municipal (population in 2017: 26,780 residents)
- 6 seats to be elected to the conseil communautaire (Eurométropole de Strasbourg )

2020 Illkirch-Graffenstaden municipal election results
Leader	List	First round		Second round		Seats	
Leader	List	Votes	%	Votes	%	CM	CC
Claude Froehly *	PS	1,873	31.06	2,173	34.51	6	1
Richard Hamm	EELV	710	11.77	2,173	34.51	6	1
Thibaud Philipps	LR	1,650	27.36	2,500	39.70	25	5
Pascale Gendrault	DVD	1,084	17.97	1,142	18.13	3	0
Rémy Beaujeux	DVD	712	11.80	481	7.63	1	0
Valid votes		6,029	97.70	6,296	98.41		
White votes		71	1.15	57	0.89		
Rejected votes		71	1.15	45	0.70		
Total		6,171	100	6,398	100	35	3
Abstentions		11,772	65.61	11,534	64.32		
Registered voters - voter turnout		17,943	34.39	17,932	35.68		

=== Lingolsheim ===
- Incumbent mayor: Yves Bur (LR)
- 33 seats to be elected to the conseil municipal (population in 2017: 18,324 residents)
- 4 seats to be elected to the conseil communautaire (Eurométropole de Strasbourg)

2020 Lingolsheim municipal election results
Leader	List	First round		Seats	
Leader	List	Votes	%	CM	CC
Catherine Graef-Eckert	LR	1,738	54.02	26	3
Valérie Wackermann	PS	1,048	32.57	5	1
Xavier Dannel	DVD	431	13.39	2	0
Valid votes		3,217	97.54		
White votes		43	1.30		
Rejected votes		38	1.15		
Total		3,298	100	33	4
Abstentions		8,703	72.52		
Registered voters - voter turnout		12,001	27.48		

=== Molsheim ===
- Incumbent mayor: Jean-Michel Weber (LR)
- 29 seats to be elected to the conseil municipal (population in 2017: 9,312 residents)
- 10 seats to be elected to the conseil communautaire (CC de la Région de Molsheim-Mutzig)

2020 Molsheim municipal election results
Leader	List	First round		Seats	
Leader	List	Votes	%	CM	CC
Laurent Furst	LR	1,995	60.45	24	8
Jean-Michel Weber *	LR	1,305	39.54	5	2
Valid votes		3,300	98.21		
White votes		25	0.74		
Rejected votes		35	1.04		
Total		3,360	100	29	10
Abstentions		2,837	45.78		
Registered voters - voter turnout		6,197	54.22		

=== Mutzig ===
- Incumbent mayor: Jean-Luc Schickelé (DVD)
- 29 seats to be elected to the conseil municipal (population in 2017: 6,011 residents)
- 6 seats to be elected to the conseil communautaire (CC de la Région de Molsheim-Mutzig)

2020 Mutzig municipal election results
Leader	List	First round		Second round		Seats	
Leader	List	Votes	%	Votes	%	CM	CC
Jean-Luc Schickelé *	DVD	729	45.05	817	51.25	23	5
Claudio Fazio	ECO	523	32.32	580	36.38	5	1
Raymond Bernard	DVD	366	22.62	197	12.35	1	0
Valid votes		1,618	96.71	1,594	98.09		
White votes		28	1.67	16	0.98		
Rejected votes		27	1.61	15	0.92		
Total		1,673	100	1,625	100	29	6
Abstentions		2,061	55.20	2,116	56.56		
Registered voters - voter turnout		3,734	44.80	3,741	43.44		

=== Oberhausbergen ===
- Incumbent mayor: Cécile Delattre-Van Hecke (UDI)
- 29 seats to be elected to the conseil municipal (population in 2017: 5,381 residents)
- 1 seats to be elected to the conseil communautaire (Eurométropole de Strasbourg)

2020 Oberhausbergen municipal election results
Leader	List	First round		Seats	
Leader	List	Votes	%	CM	CC
Cécile Delattre-Van Hecke *	UDI	862	56.41	23	1
Théo Klumpp	DVD	406	26.57	4	0
Jean-Marc Lotz	DVD	260	17.01	2	0
Valid votes		1,528	98.77		
White votes		10	0.65		
Rejected votes		9	0.58		
Total		1,547	100	29	1
Abstentions		1,853	54.50		
Registered voters - voter turnout		3,400	45.50		

=== Obernai ===
- Incumbent mayor: Bernard Fischer (LR)
- 33 seats to be elected to the conseil municipal (population in 2017: 11,279 residents)
- 13 seats to be elected to the conseil communautaire (CC du Pays de Sainte-Odile)

2020 Obernai municipal election results
Leader	List	First round		Seats	
Leader	List	Votes	%	CM	CC
Bernard Fischer *	LR	2,127	62.70	27	11
Catherine Edel-Laurent	DVD	1,265	37.29	6	2
Valid votes		3,392	97.30		
White votes		32	0.92		
Rejected votes		62	1.78		
Total		3,486	100	33	13
Abstentions		5,691	62.01		
Registered voters - voter turnout		9,177	37.99		

=== Ostwald ===
- Incumbent mayor: Jean-Marie Beutel (PS)
- 33 seats to be elected to the conseil municipal (population in 2017: 12,604 residents)
- 2 seats to be elected to the conseil communautaire (Eurométropole de Strasbourg )

2020 Ostwald municipal election results
Leader	List	First round		Second round		Seats	
Leader	List	Votes	%	Votes	%	CM	CC
Jean-Marie Beutel *	PS	833	29.12	997	34.37	5	0
Fabienne Baas	EELV	785	27.44	1,355	46.72	25	2
Vincent Florange	DVD	666	23.28	1,355	46.72	25	2
Claude Steinle	DVD	576	20.13	548	18.89	3	0
Valid votes		2,860	97.25	2,900	97.48		
White votes		38	1.29	32	1.08		
Rejected votes		43	1.46	43	1.45		
Total		2,941	100	2,975	100	33	2
Abstentions		5,149	63.35	5,143	63.35		
Registered voters - voter turnout		8,090	36.35	8,188	36.65		

=== Val-de-Moder ===
- Incumbent mayor: Jean-Denis Enderlin (DVD)
- 33 seats to be elected to the conseil municipal (population in 2017: 5,096 residents)
- 3 seats to be elected to the conseil communautaire (CA de Haguenau)

2020 Val-de-Modor municipal election results
Leader	List	First round		Seats	
Leader	List	Votes	%	CM	CC
Jean-Denis Enderlin *	DVD	767	100.00	33	3
Valid votes		767	89.19		
White votes		17	1.98		
Rejected votes		76	8.84		
Total		860	100	33	3
Abstentions		2,773	76.33		
Registered voters - voter turnout		3,633	23.67		

=== Reichshoffen ===
- Incumbent mayor: Hubert Walter (LR)
- 29 seats to be elected to the conseil municipal (population in 2017: 5,396 residents)
- 8 seats to be elected to the conseil communautaire (CC du Pays de Niederbronn-les-Bains)

2020 Reichshoffen municipal election results
Leader	List	First round		Seats	
Leader	List	Votes	%	CM	CC
Hubert Walter *	LR	926	54.40	23	6
Jean-Yves Jung	DIV	465	27.32	4	1
Joseph Contino	DIV	311	18.27	2	1
Valid votes		1,702	97.48		
White votes		8	0.46		
Rejected votes		36	2.06		
Total		3,486	100	29	8
Abstentions		2,250	56.31		
Registered voters - voter turnout		3,996	43.69		

=== Rosheim ===
- Incumbent mayor: Michel Herr (UDI)
- 29 seats to be elected to the conseil municipal (population in 2017: 5,149 residents)
- 8 seats to be elected to the conseil communautaire (CC des Portes de Rosheim)

2020 Rosheim municipal election results
Leader	List	First round		Seats	
Leader	List	Votes	%	CM	CC
Michel Herr *	UDI	1,141	60.43	24	7
Philippe Elsass	ECO	747	39.56	5	1
Valid votes		1,888	98.03		
White votes		13	0.67		
Rejected votes		25	1.30		
Total		1,926	100	29	8
Abstentions		2,291	54.33		
Registered voters - voter turnout		4,217	45.67		

=== Saverne ===
- Incumbent mayor: Stéphane Leyenberger (LR)
- 33 seats to be elected to the conseil municipal (population in 2017: 11,239 residents)
- 17 seats to be elected to the conseil communautaire (CC du Pays de Saverne)

2020 Saverne municipal election results
Leader	List	First round		Seats	
Leader	List	Votes	%	CM	CC
Stéphane Leyenberger *	LR	1,800	64.79	28	14
Nadine Schnitzler	DVD	649	23.36	3	2
Laurence Wagner	DVD	329	11.84	2	1
Valid votes		2,778	96.59		
White votes		40	1.39		
Rejected votes		58	2.02		
Total		2,876	100	33	17
Abstentions		4,486	62.76		
Registered voters - voter turnout		7,722	37.34		

=== Schiltigheim ===
- Incumbent mayor: Danielle Dambach (EELV)
- 39 seats to be elected to the conseil municipal (population in 2017: 31,894 residents)
- 7 seats to be elected to the conseil communautaire (Eurométropole de Strasbourg)

2020 Schiltigheim municipal election results
Leader	List	First round		Seats	
Leader	List	Votes	%	CM	CC
Danielle Dambach *	EELV	3,169	55.29	32	6
Christian Ball	LR	1,179	20.57	4	1
Hélène Hollederer	LREM	746	13.01	3	0
Raphäel Rodrigues	DIV	329	5.74	1	0
Francis Guyot	DIV	197	3.43	0	0
Denise Grandmougin	EXG	111	1.93	0	0
Valid votes		5,731	97.10		
White votes		57	0.97		
Rejected votes		114	1.93		
Total		3,902	100	39	7
Abstentions		12,485	67.90		
Registered voters - voter turnout		18,387	32.10		

=== Sélestat ===
- Incumbent mayor: Marcel Bauer (LR)
- 33 seats to be elected to the conseil municipal (population in 2017: 19,252 residents)
- 21 seats to be elected to the conseil communautaire (CC de Sélestat)

2020 Sélestat municipal election results
Leader	List	First round		Second round		Seats	
Leader	List	Votes	%	Votes	%	CM	CC
Marcel Bauer *	LR	1,969	36.66	2,355	41.25	24	15
Denis Digel	DVC	1,725	32.12	2,216	38.81	6	4
Caroline Reys	EELV	1,262	23.50	1,138	19.93	3	2
Jean-Marc Kestel-Koffel	DVG	414	7.70			0	0
Valid votes		5,370	96.70	5,709	97.37		
White votes		47	0.85	70	1.19		
Rejected votes		136	2.45	84	1.43		
Total		5,553	100	5,863	100	33	21
Abstentions		8,438	60.31	8,116	58.06		
Registered voters - voter turnout		13,991	39.69	13,979	41.94		

=== Souffelweyersheim ===
- Incumbent mayor: Pierre Perrin (UDI)
- 29 seats to be elected to the conseil municipal (population in 2017: 8,001 residents)
- 1 seats to be elected to the conseil communautaire (Eurométropole de Strasbourg)

2020 Souffelweyersheim municipal election results
Leader	List	First round		Seats	
Leader	List	Votes	%	CM	CC
Pierre Perrin *	UDI	1,676	86.57	27	1
Odile Ngo Yanga	DIV	260	13.42	2	0
Valid votes		1,936	97.24		
White votes		30	1.51		
Rejected votes		25	1.26		
Total		1,991	100	29	1
Abstentions		3,517	63.85		
Registered voters - voter turnout		5,508	36.15		

=== Strasbourg ===
- Incumbent mayor: Roland Ries (DVG)
- 65 seats to be elected to the conseil municipal (population in 2017: 280,966 residents)
- 49 seats to be elected to the conseil communautaire (Eurométropole de Strasbourg)

2020 Strasbourg municipal election results
Leader	List	First round		Second round		Seats	
Leader	List	Votes	%	Votes	%	CM	CC
Jeanne Barseghian	EÉLV-PCF	13,532	27.87	21,592	41.70	47	35
Alain Fontanel	LREM-Agir-MR-MoDem	9,642	19.86	18,099	34.95	11	8
Jean-Philippe Vetter	LR-SL-LC-UDI	8,862	18.26				
Catherine Trautmann	PS-PRG	9,601	19.77	12,080	23.33	7	6
Hombeline du Parc	RN	3,044	6.27				
Kevin Loquais	LFI-G.s-REV	1,452	2.99				
Chantal Cutajar	UL	1,058	2.17				
Patrick Arbogast	DIV	583	1.20				
Clément Soubise	NPA	399	0.82				
Louise Fève	LO	212	0.43				
Mathieu Le Tallec	POID	149	0.30				
Valid votes		48,540	98.34	51,771	98.32		
White votes		284	0.58	502	0.95		
Rejected votes		537	1.09	380	0.72		
Total		49,361	100	52,653	100	65	49
Abstentions		94,239	65.63	90,985	63.34		
Registered voters - voter turnout		143,600	34.37	143,638	36.66		

=== Vendenheim ===
- Incumbent mayor: Philippe Pfrimmer (DVD)
- 29 seats to be elected to the conseil municipal (population in 2017: 5,664 residents)
- 1 seats to be elected to the conseil communautaire (Eurométropole de Strasbourg)

2020 Vendenheim municipal election results
Leader	List	First round		Seats	
Leader	List	Votes	%	CM	CC
Philippe Pfrimmer *	DVD	1,100	100.00	29	1
Valid votes		1,100	89.07		
White votes		75	6.07		
Rejected votes		60	4.86		
Total		1,235	100	29	1
Abstentions		3,379	73.23		
Registered voters - voter turnout		4,614	26.77		

=== La Wantzenau ===
- Incumbent mayor: Patrick Depyl (MoDem)
- 29 seats to be elected to the conseil municipal (population in 2017: 5,841 residents)
- 1 seats to be elected to the conseil communautaire (Eurométropole de Strasbourg)

2020 La Wantzenau municipal election results
Leader	List	First round		Seats	
Leader	List	Votes	%	CM	CC
Michèle Kannengieser	DVD	1,395	55.51	23	1
Patrick Depyl *	MoDem	701	27.89	4	0
Martial Schillinger	DVD	417	16.59	2	0
Valid votes		2,513	98.39		
White votes		26	1.02		
Rejected votes		15	0.59		
Total		2,554	100	29	1
Abstentions		2,324	47.64		
Registered voters - voter turnout		4,878	52.36		

=== Wasselonne ===
- Incumbent mayor: Michèle Eschlimann (LR)
- 29 seats to be elected to the conseil municipal (population in 2017: 5,652 residents)
- 10 seats to be elected to the conseil communautaire (CC de la Mossig et du Vignoble)

2020 Wasselonne municipal election results
Leader	List	First round		Seats	
Leader	List	Votes	%	CM	CC
Michèle Eschlimann *	LR	1,103	57.38	23	8
Philippe Schnitzler	DVC	819	42.61	6	2
Valid votes		1,922	97.46		
White votes		21	1.06		
Rejected votes		29	1.47		
Total		1,972	100	29	10
Abstentions		2,183	52.54		
Registered voters - voter turnout		4,155	47.46		

=== Wissembourg ===
- Incumbent mayor: Christian Gliech (LREM)
- 29 seats to be elected to the conseil municipal (population in 2017: 7,537 residents)
- 15 seats to be elected to the conseil communautaire (CC du Pays de Wissembourg)

2020 Wissembourg municipal election results
Leader	List	First round		Second round		Seats	
Leader	List	Votes	%	Votes	%	CM	CC
Sandra Fischer-Junck	DVD	1,297	47.26	1,867	60.97	24	13
Christian Gliech *	LREM	834	30.39	1,195	30.02	5	2
André Krieger	DVD	613	22.33	Withdrew		0	0
Valid votes		2,744	96.93	3,062	96.29		
White votes		27	0.95	71	2.23		
Rejected votes		60	2.12	47	1.48		
Total		2,831	100	3,180	100	29	15
Abstentions		2,916	50.74	2,561	44.61		
Registered voters - voter turnout		5,747	49.26	5,741	55.39		

== See also ==
- 2020 French municipal elections
  - 2020 Ain municipal elections
  - 2020 Allier municipal elections
  - 2020 Caen municipal election
  - 2020 Paris municipal election
