= Souffelweyersheim =

Souffelweyersheim Süffelwirsche (Alsatian)
- Commune
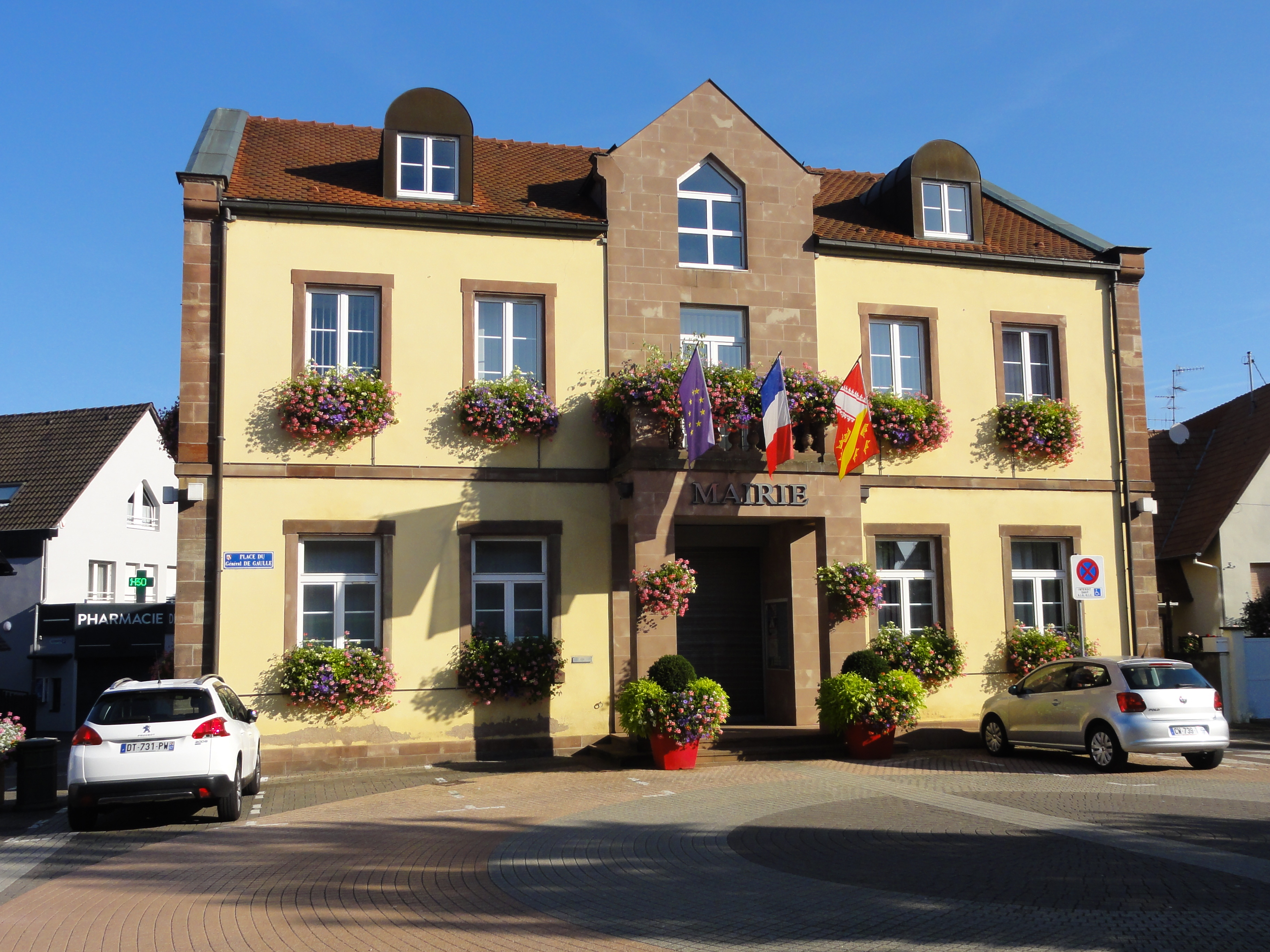
- The town hall in Souffelweyersheim

- Coat of arms
- Location of Souffelweyersheim
- Location within France Location within Grand Est
- Coordinates: 48°38′08″N 7°44′30″E
- Country: France
- Region: Grand Est
- Department: Bas-Rhin
- Arrondissement: Strasbourg
- Canton: Hœnheim
- Intercommunality: Strasbourg Eurométropole

Government
  - Mayor (2020–2026): Pierre Perrin
- Area^{1}: 4.51 km^{2} (1.74 sq mi)
- Highest elevation: 153 m (502 ft)
- Lowest elevation: 133 m (436 ft)
- Population (2023): 8,239
  - Density: 1,830/km^{2} (4,730/sq mi)
- Time zone: UTC+01:00 (CET)
  - Summer (DST): UTC+02:00 (CEST)
- INSEE/Postal code: 67471 /67460
- ^{1} French Land Register data, which excludes lakes, ponds, glaciers > 1 km^{2} (0.386 sq mi or 247 acres) and river estuaries.

Souffelweyersheim (French pronunciation: [sufœlvajœrsajm]; German: Suffelweyersheim [zʊfl̩ˈvaɪɐshaɪm]; Alsatian: Süffelwirsche) is a commune in the Bas-Rhin department, Alsace, Grand Est, northeastern France, and is part of metropolitan Strasbourg.

== Etymology ==
Souffelweyersheim means: the village on the pond of Souffel. Souffel (the Souffel river) + Weyer (the pond) + S (of) + Heim (hamlet, village).

Locally the name is shortened and the village is called Souffel.

== Geography ==
The village covers an area of 451 hectares (1114 acres), and is located 6 km (3¾ miles) north of Strasbourg at an altitude of 140 metres (460 ft). Located in the plain of Alsace, between the massifs of the Vosges and the Black Forest, the plain is bisected by the Souffel river from which the village takes its name. This river rises in Kuttolsheim and joins the Ill river, a tributary of the Rhine, a little south of Wantzenau after flowing 27 km (17 mi).

== History ==
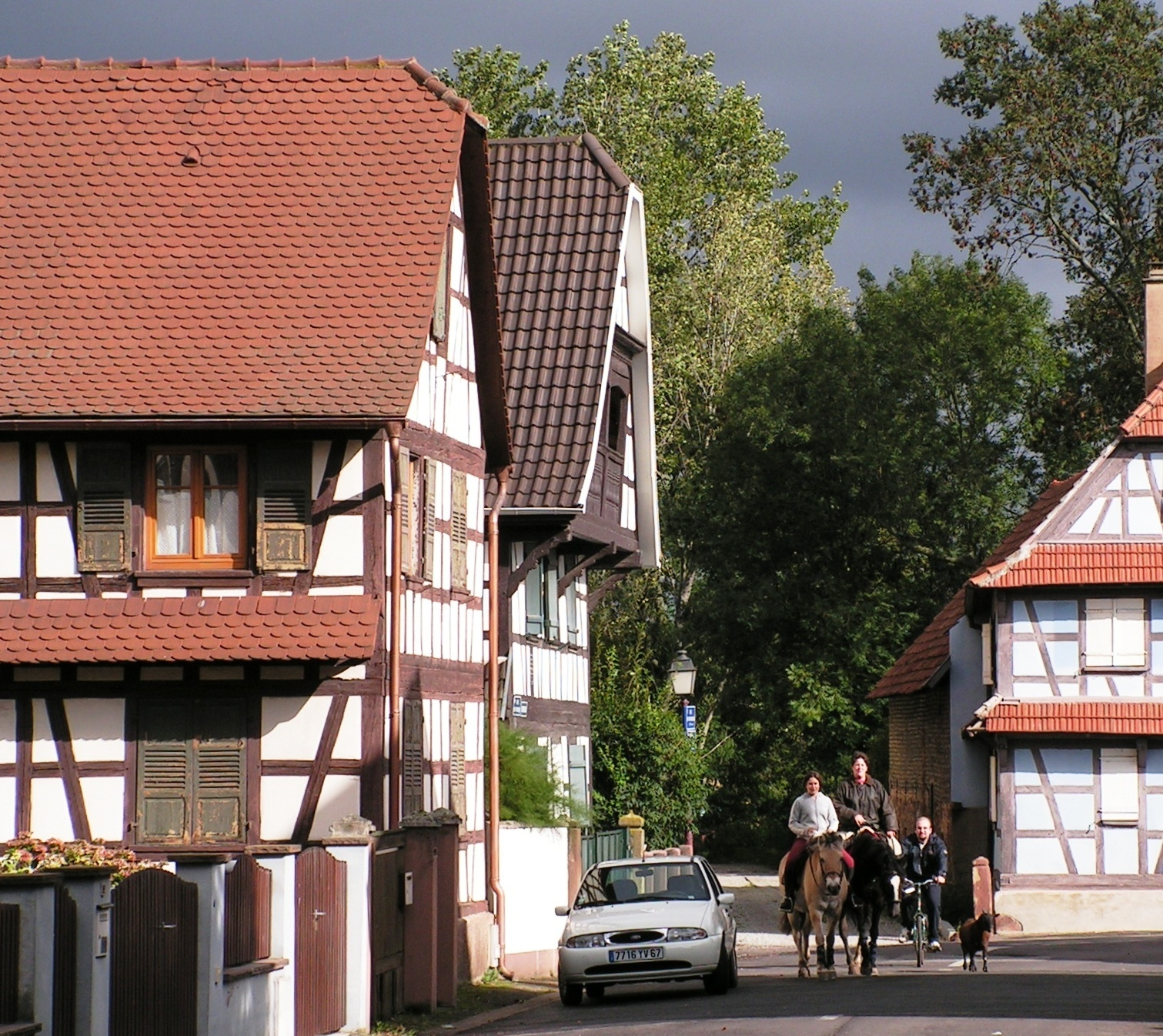
Half-timbered houses

In 1790, the formerly common pasture meadows were subdivided, and sections were given to Souffelweyersheim, Hoenheim, Bischheim, Adelshoffen and Schiltigheim.

In 1792, Austria and Prussia began hostilities against France. From October to December 1793, engagements between the troops of the French Republic and the Austro-Prussian alliance centered on a front near Hoenheim – Griesheim-sur-Souffel – Dingsheim before the Austro-Prussian troops were pushed back out of Alsace in January 1794.

After his disastrous Russian campaign, Napoleon Bonaparte managed with difficulty to return to France, but enemy forces in the Sixth Coalition followed. In January 1814, the French troops lost Strasbourg to Cossacks who cantoned in Hoenheim, Bischheim and Schiltigheim. Napoleon abdicated in favour of Louis XVIII, and was banished to the isle of Elba. Napoleon escaped from Elba and returned to France on 26 February 1815. In a campaign that lasted a Hundred Days he attempted to remain on the throne of France. Ten days after Napoleon's final defeat at the Battle of Waterloo, General Jean Rapp led the French forces against the Crown Prince of Württemberg in the Battle of La Suffel near Souffelweyersheim and Hoenheim. The day after the battle, the Crown Prince of Württemberg ordered the burning of the village of Souffelweyersheim. It took all of the nineteenth century to rebuild the village.

1852 was the year of the inauguration of two new transportation routes near Souffelweyersheim: the Marne-Rhine Canal which connects Vitry-le-François to Strasbourg, and the railway line between Paris and Strasbourg.

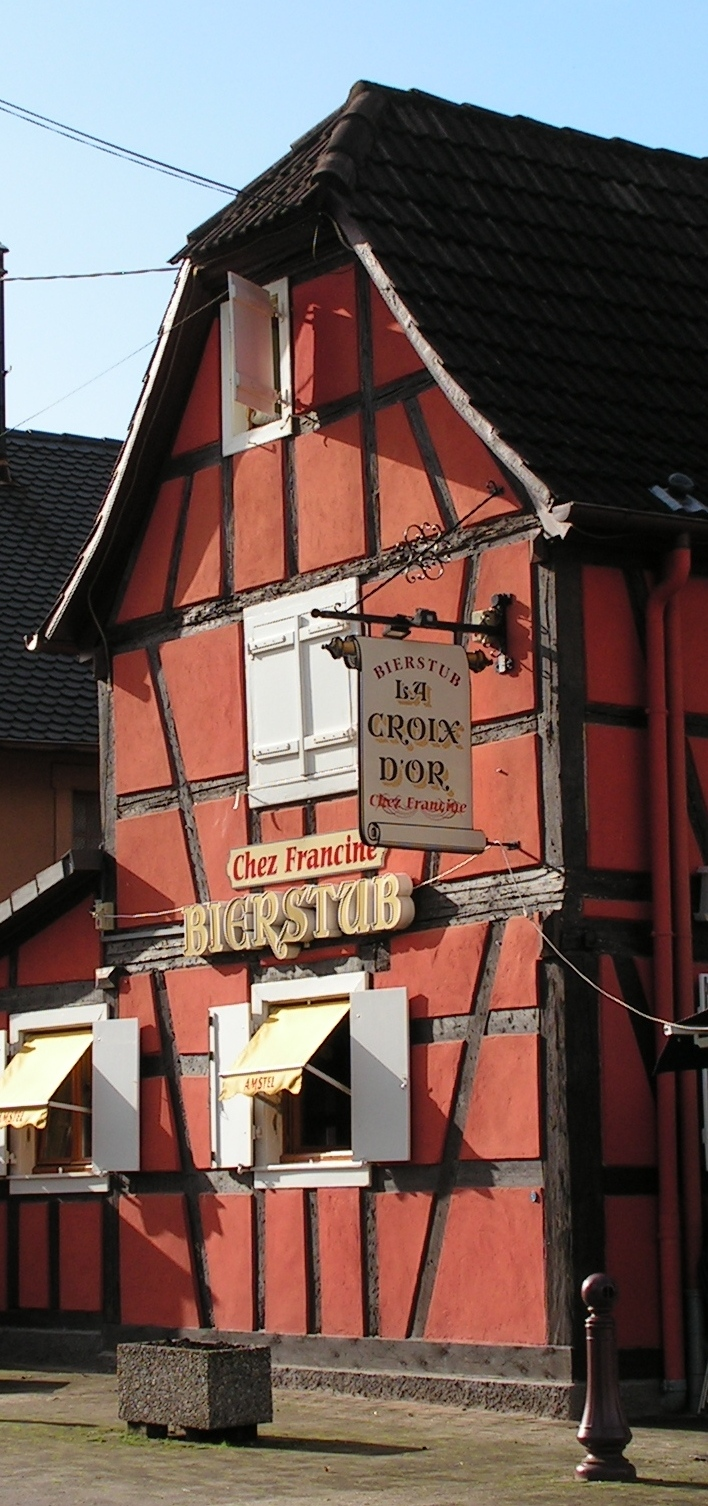

On 19 July 1870, the Franco-Prussian War began. On 7 August, shortly after the battle of Froeschwiller-Wœrth, German troops arrived at Souffelweyersheim. The troops settled in Reichstett and began a siege of Strasbourg on 12 August, arranging with the local populace for supplies for the troops. On 27 September, Strasbourg, burnt by the continuous bombing, surrendered. The Treaty of Frankfurt, signed 10 May 1871, put an end to the war, but France yielded three of departments of Alsace-Moselle, keeping only Belfort.

In 1906, newly expanded rail yards at Hausbergen were completed. This facility serves several communes in the Souffelweyersheim area. L On 2 September 1939, the inhabitants of the communes in front of the Maginot Line were evacuated to the valley of the Bruche River. On 3 September 1939, the United Kingdom, Australia, New Zealand and France declared war on Germany. On 9 September, the evacuated inhabitants embarked on a second journey to the South of France. They did not return to Alsace, which was occupied by the Germans from August 1940 until liberation on 23 November 1944 by the French 2nd Armoured Division of General Leclerc.

In January 1945, a German offensive called Operation Nordwind forced a redeployment of the Allied troops in the north of Alsace. General Charles de Gaulle refused the American order to evacuate Strasbourg and the French troops pushed the Germans back but not before they reached Offendorf. Souffelweyersheim and its environs remained under the fire of the German batteries until April 1945.

A law of 1966 created the Urban Community of Strasbourg and Souffelweyersheim was integrated into it. 1970 saw the completion of the construction of the motorway A34 Metz – Strasbourg, later absorbed by the A4 motorway connecting Paris to Strasbourg, skirting the rail yard at Hausbergen.

=== List of mayors ===
- 1815: Georges Schaeffer
- 1925–1941: Alfred Vix
- 1941–1944: Philippe Heim

== Demographics ==
Historical population

Year	Pop.	±% p.a.
1793	423	—
1800	475	+1.67%
1806	528	+1.78%
1821	662	+1.52%
1831	686	+0.36%
1836	720	+0.97%
1841	676	−1.25%
1846	668	−0.24%
1851	704	+1.06%
1856	691	−0.37%
1861	671	−0.59%
1866	708	+1.08%
1872	713	+0.12%
1876	716	+0.11%
1881	781	+1.75%
1886	826	+1.13%
1891	915	+2.07%
1896	955	+0.86%
1901	990	+0.72%

Year	Pop.	±% p.a.
1906	1,100	+2.13%
1911	1,212	+1.96%
1921	1,170	−0.35%
1926	1,289	+1.96%
1931	1,624	+4.73%
1936	1,936	+3.58%
1946	2,052	+0.58%
1954	2,340	+1.66%
1962	2,750	+2.04%
1968	3,144	+2.26%
1975	3,978	+3.42%
1982	4,012	+0.12%
1990	5,591	+4.24%
1999	6,017	+0.82%
2007	6,368	+0.71%
2012	7,549	+3.46%
2017	8,001	+1.17%
2023	8,239	+0.49%

Source: EHESS and INSEE (1968-2023)

== Places of interest ==
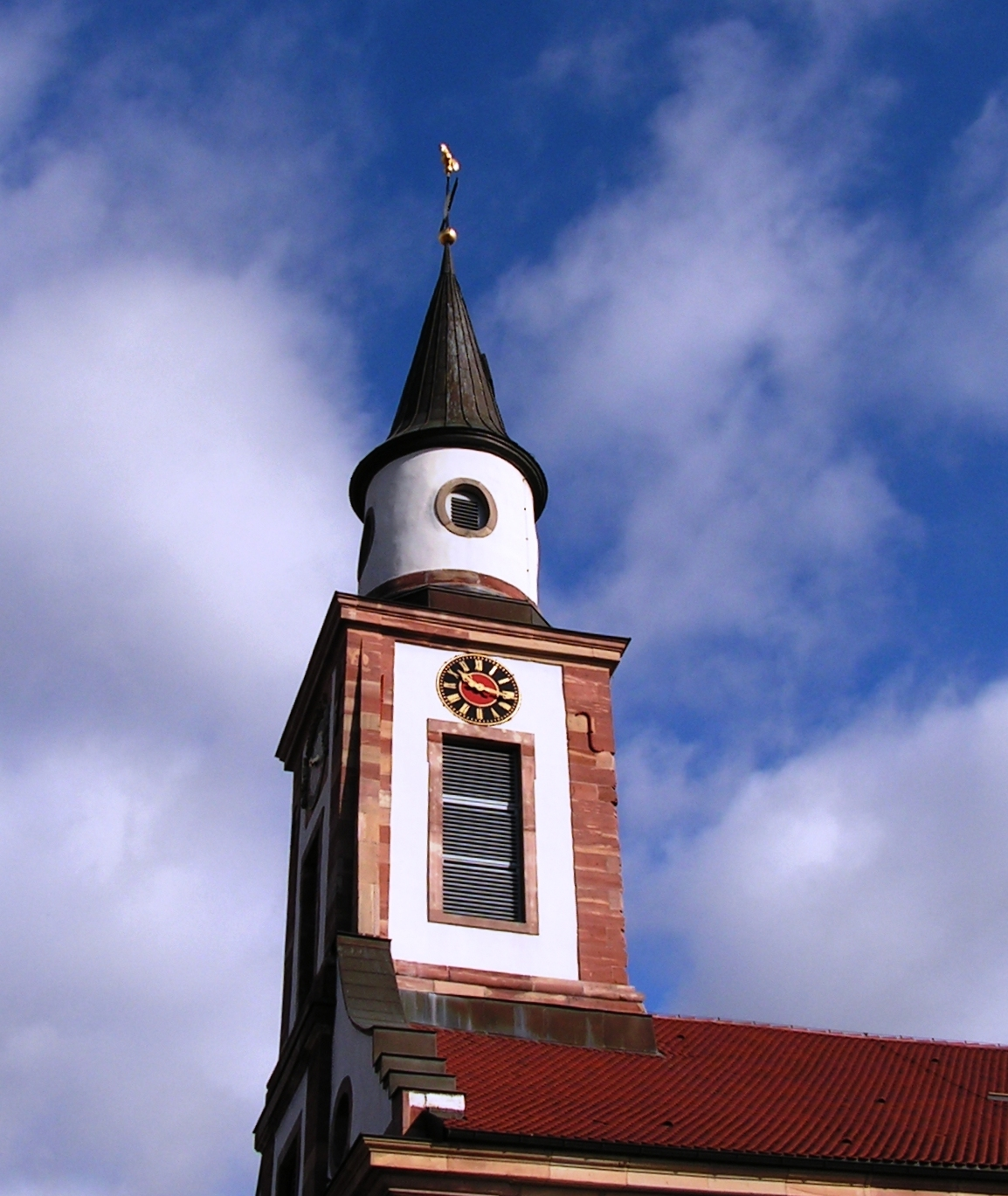
St. George's Church

St. George's church was built in 1781 in the neo-classical style. Most of the tower has been rebuilt since then.

== See also ==
- Communes of the Bas-Rhin department
