= Hœnheim =

Hœnheim Heene (Alsatian)
- Commune
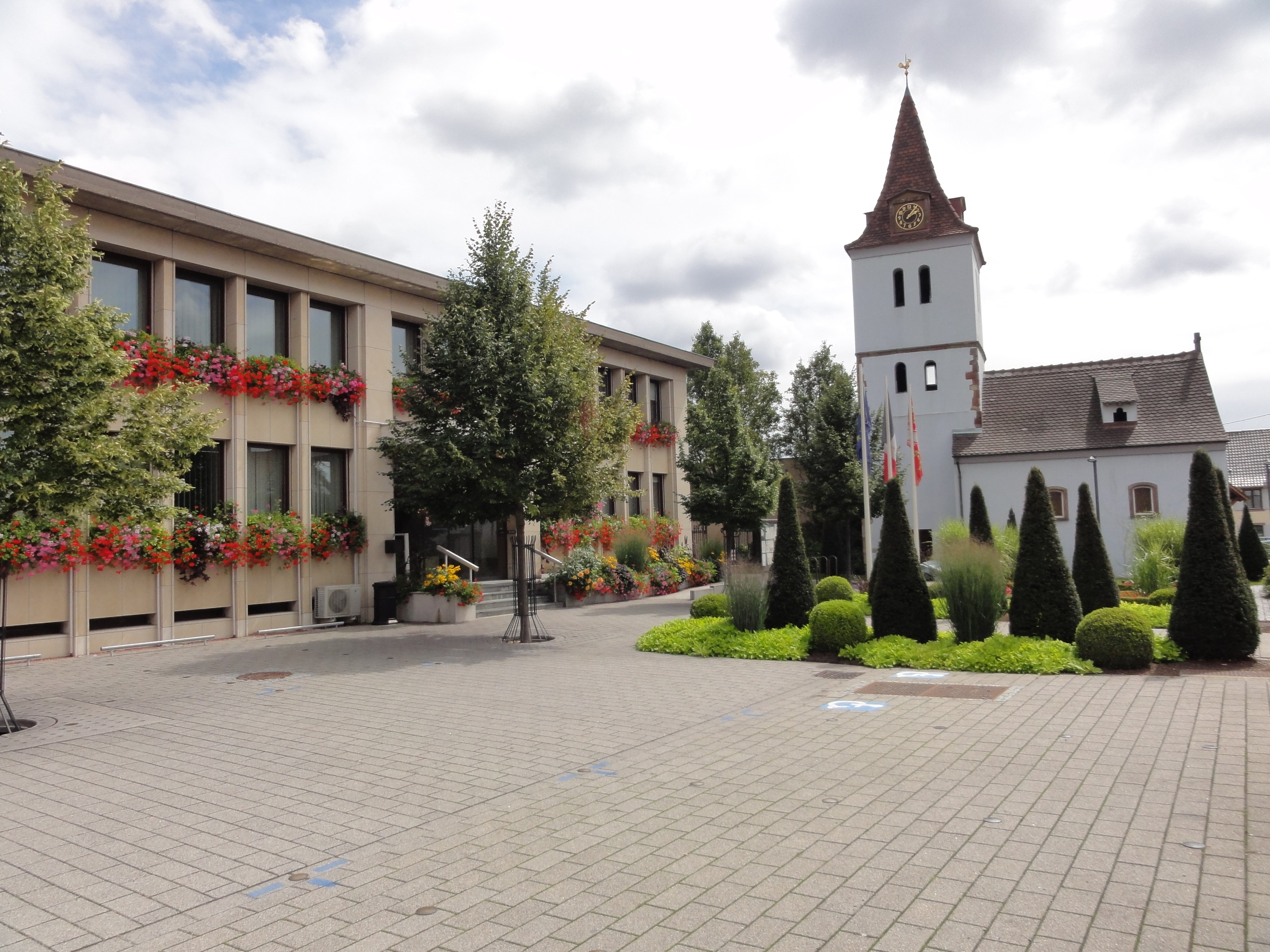
- The town hall and chapel in Hœnheim

- Coat of arms
- Location of Hœnheim
- Location within France Location within Grand Est
- Coordinates: 48°37′30″N 7°45′19″E
- Country: France
- Region: Grand Est
- Department: Bas-Rhin
- Arrondissement: Strasbourg
- Canton: Hœnheim
- Intercommunality: Strasbourg Eurométropole

Government
  - Mayor (2020–2026): Vincent Debes
- Area^{1}: 3.42 km^{2} (1.32 sq mi)
- Elevation: 140 m (460 ft)
- Highest elevation: 151 m (495 ft)
- Lowest elevation: 133 m (436 ft)
- Population (2023): 11,742
  - Density: 3,430/km^{2} (8,890/sq mi)
- Time zone: UTC+01:00 (CET)
  - Summer (DST): UTC+02:00 (CEST)
- INSEE/Postal code: 67204 /67800
- ^{1} French Land Register data, which excludes lakes, ponds, glaciers > 1 km^{2} (0.386 sq mi or 247 acres) and river estuaries.

Hœnheim or Hoenheim (French pronunciation: [ønajm]; German: Hönheim; Alsatian: Heene) is a commune in the Bas-Rhin department in Grand Est in north-eastern France.

== Heraldry ==
"D'or aux trois corbeaux de sable posés deux et un". ("Or, three crows Sable, 2 and 1".)

The three black crows come from the legend of the monk Benedict of Nursia, father of the monastic rule of the Benedictines. Saint Benedict lived withdrawn in a cave and shared his food with a crow, which came each day to visit him. A jealous priest sent poisoned bread to him. He gave it to the crow while saying to him to throw it in a place inaccessible to men.

The crow was then a symbol of obligingness, intelligence and fidelity.

== Geography ==
Hœnheim lies 5 km (3.1 mi) north of Strasbourg. The neighboring communes of Hœnheim are (North to South): Souffelweyersheim, Reichstett (canton of Mundolsheim), an enclave of Bischheim, an enclave of Schiltigheim (canton of Schiltigheim).

Hœnheim is located on the river Ill and the Rhine-Marne canal.

The historic center is on a ridge and overlooking the "Ried" (Zone of easily flooded meadows) of Ill. This historical center gave the name to Hœnheim, the first mentions indicate the spelling Hohenheim, in other words residence on the hill.

== History ==
Vestiges and reports raised on the ground attest the existence of a small group of dwellings near Hoenheim from the Neolithic age.

The first mention of the name Hoenheim goes back to the year 742.

At the end of the 9th century, the village of Hœnheim was the property of the Benedictine monastery of Honau, created by the brother of Saint Odile.

Under the Holy Roman Empire, Hœnheim became the property of the diocese of Strasbourg, which allotted its land to knights or religious communities. Around the mid-14th century, the diocese made a gift of the Fief of Hœnheim to knights.

1350 sees the first written mention of the Chapel of John the Baptist.

During the Hundred Years' War, Hœnheim, like many villages, had to undergo the passage of the "Écorcheurs" who tried, without success, to take Strasbourg.

While passing through the hands of various noble families, the Fief finally returned to the Uttenheim of Ramstein family in 1457.

In the 16th century, the lords of Uttenheim, dismayed by the escapades of the clergy of this time, joined the Reformation and with them the inhabitants of Hoenheim.

At the time of the Thirty Years' War, Hoenheim, like Bischheim, was a victim of the exactions of the two sides. In 1649, at the time of the treaty of Westphalia, putting an end to the war, Alsace returned to France and subsequent Catholicism.

In 1676 the last lord of Uttenheim died without an heir. The quarrel of succession ended in 1681 with the victory of the family Rathamhausen of Stein over the canons of the great chapter of Strasbourg. In 1689, the elder branch of Rathamhausen dies out and the Fief of Hœnheim returns to the great chapter of Strasbourg. On 21 May 1691 the bishop of Strasbourg gave the Fief to the knight-lord of Chamlay, maréchal général des logis des camps et des armées de France.

In 1719 the marshal of Chamlay died without leaving an heir. The bishop of Strasbourg, Cardinal of Rohan (Armand Gaston Maximilien de Rohan), gave the Fief to the Klinglin family which had the full confidence of the royal and local authorities.

After the French Revolution, Hoenheim was attached to the new district of Strasbourg (4 March 1790) during the formation of the Departments. In the same year, at the suggestion of Schiltigheim, the "Ried" (Zone of easily flooded meadows), previously public pasture common to Souffelweyersheim, Hoenheim, Bischheim, Adelsoffen and Schiltigheim was divided. This division led, amongst other things, to the creation of the enclave of Bischheim and the enclave of Schiltigheim in the centre of Hoenheim's territory.

On 2 October 1791 all the goods of the Klinglin family and of the church were confiscated and sold to the inhabitants.

In 1792, the Émigré, joined forces with the Austro-Prussians begin the hostilities to regain the power in France. From October to December 1793, engagements between the troops of the French Republic and the Austro-Prussians took place around the Hoenheim - Griesheim-on-Souffel - Dingsheim line, until the Austro-Prussians troops were pushed back out of Alsace by January 1794.

In 1793, the commune of Hoenheim was attached to the canton of Hausbergen.

On 17 February 1800 Hoenheim was attached to the new district of Strasbourg.

In 1813, Napoleon's Russian campaign finished in catastrophe. He managed, with difficulty, to return to France, but the troops of the Coalition were behind him. In January 1814, the French troops were kept in Strasbourg by the attacks of the Cossacks who settled in Hoenheim, Bischheim and Schiltigheim. Following Napoleon's return and defeat at the Battle of Waterloo, the General Jean Rapp, having wind of intentions to annex Alsace and under the orders of Louis XVIII continued to fight on the Souffel, just north of Hoenheim. The battle of Souffelweyersheim-Hoenheim took place on 28 and 29 June 1815. With the victory of Coalition troops, Strasbourg was taken on 9 July.

In 1852 two new transportation routes passed by the territory of Hoenheim (but away from the village). The first is the Marne–Rhine Canal which connects Vitry-le-François to Strasbourg. The second is the Paris-Strasbourg railway line.

The Franco-Prussian War from 1870-1871 began on 19 July 1870. On 7 August, the day after the battle of Froeschwiller-Woerth, the German troops arrived in Hoenheim. The troops settled in Reichstett, a few kilometres north of Hoenheim, and began the siege of Strasbourg on 12 August. With the treaty of Frankfurt in May 1871, France was required to give up the three departments of the Alsace-Moselle.

Between 1871 and 1919, Hoenheim is attached to the "Kreises Strassburg (Land)".

Railway workshops opened in 1875 in Bischheim on a 30 ha, with 10 ha located in Hoenheim. These workshops were located on the new railway line connecting Strasbourg to Lauterbourg.

On 14 October 1878 the tramway between Place Kléber (Strasbourg) and Hoenheim was inaugurated.

On 19 June 1879 the first holder of the Catholic parish of Hoenheim was named in the new church of Hoenheim. Previously Hoenheim depended from the parish of Bischheim, which church was used by the Protestant of Bischheim too.

Inauguration of the marshalling yard of Hausbergen in 1906. It covers the territory of several communes, one of which was Hoenheim.

In 1907, the priest of Hoenheim, Dionysius Will, is elected on the Reichstag under the label of Progressivist but with the support of the Socialists.

The First World War, fought away from the Rhineland area did not cause any physical damage to Hoenheim, but resulted in the death of many men. The 'lost departments' of Alsace-Moselle were given back to the France by the Treaty of Versailles in 1919. On 28 June 1919 the canton of Bischheim - Hoenheim is attached to the new district of Strasbourg-Countryside.

On 2 September 1939 the inhabitants of the communes in front of the Maginot Line are evacuated. The inhabitants of Hoenheim, Bischheim and Schiltigheim are moved to the Bruche valley to join the evacuee centre of Niederhaslach. Only the town hall secretary and some firemen remain in the town. On September 9 a second journey awaits the evacuated inhabitants, this time the destination is to the South of France. The inhabitants of Hoenheim are divided in 5 communes of Haute-Vienne which they will leave only in August 1940 to return to Alsace annexed by the Germans. Under the Nazi occupation, Hoenheim is administratively attached to the “Gross Strasburg”. On 27 May, 11 August and 25 September 1944 the bombardment of Strasbourg and its suburbs by the Allies: Junkers factories in Meinau, railway workshops of Bischheim and marshalling yard of Hausbergen are all attacked. November 23 Strasbourg is released by the 2nd French Armoured Division of General Leclerc, who assigns the local FFI to liberate the suburbs. Yet Hoenheim and its neighbourhoods remained under the fire of the German batteries until April 1945.

The last tram ran to Hoenheim on 1 May 1960, leaving only the bus as a public transport link with Strasbourg.

In 1966, Hoenheim was integrated into the newly created Urban Community of Strasbourg.

In 1969, the collapse of the frontage of the Chapel of John the Baptist obliged the Protestant parish to seek a new building.

1970 saw the completion of the construction of the motorway A34 Metz - Strasbourg, later taken over by A4 connecting Paris to Strasbourg, alongside the marshalling yard of Hausbergen.

In 1978, the Protestant parish of Hoenheim inaugurated its church. The Protestant parish left the renovated Chapel of John the Baptist to the use of the Romanian Orthodox parish.

With the new public transport policy, a new tram line was built by the Urban Community of Strasbourg during the 1990s, with the B tram line linking Hoenheim and Strasbourg completed in 2001. The terminus of the B-Line in Hoenheim links the B tram line with the Strasbourg-Lauterbourg railway line.

== Demography ==
Historical population

Year	Pop.	±% p.a.
1793	620	—
1800	679	+1.31%
1806	760	+1.90%
1821	1,011	+1.92%
1831	1,222	+1.91%
1836	1,298	+1.21%
1841	1,300	+0.03%
1846	1,476	+2.57%
1851	1,381	−1.32%
1856	1,330	−0.75%
1861	1,389	+0.87%
1866	1,452	+0.89%
1871	1,484	+0.44%
1875	1,533	+0.82%
1880	1,598	+0.83%
1885	1,583	−0.19%
1890	1,761	+2.15%
1895	1,808	+0.53%
1900	2,201	+4.01%

Year	Pop.	±% p.a.
1905	2,292	+0.81%
1910	2,554	+2.19%
1921	2,383	−0.63%
1926	2,611	+1.84%
1931	2,996	+2.79%
1936	3,456	+2.90%
1946	3,397	−0.17%
1954	3,600	+0.73%
1962	3,787	+0.64%
1968	4,505	+2.94%
1975	8,589	+9.66%
1982	10,432	+2.82%
1990	10,566	+0.16%
1999	10,726	+0.17%
2007	10,544	−0.21%
2012	11,031	+0.91%
2017	11,215	+0.33%
2023	11,742	+0.77%

Source: EHESS and INSEE (1968-2023)

== Landmarks ==
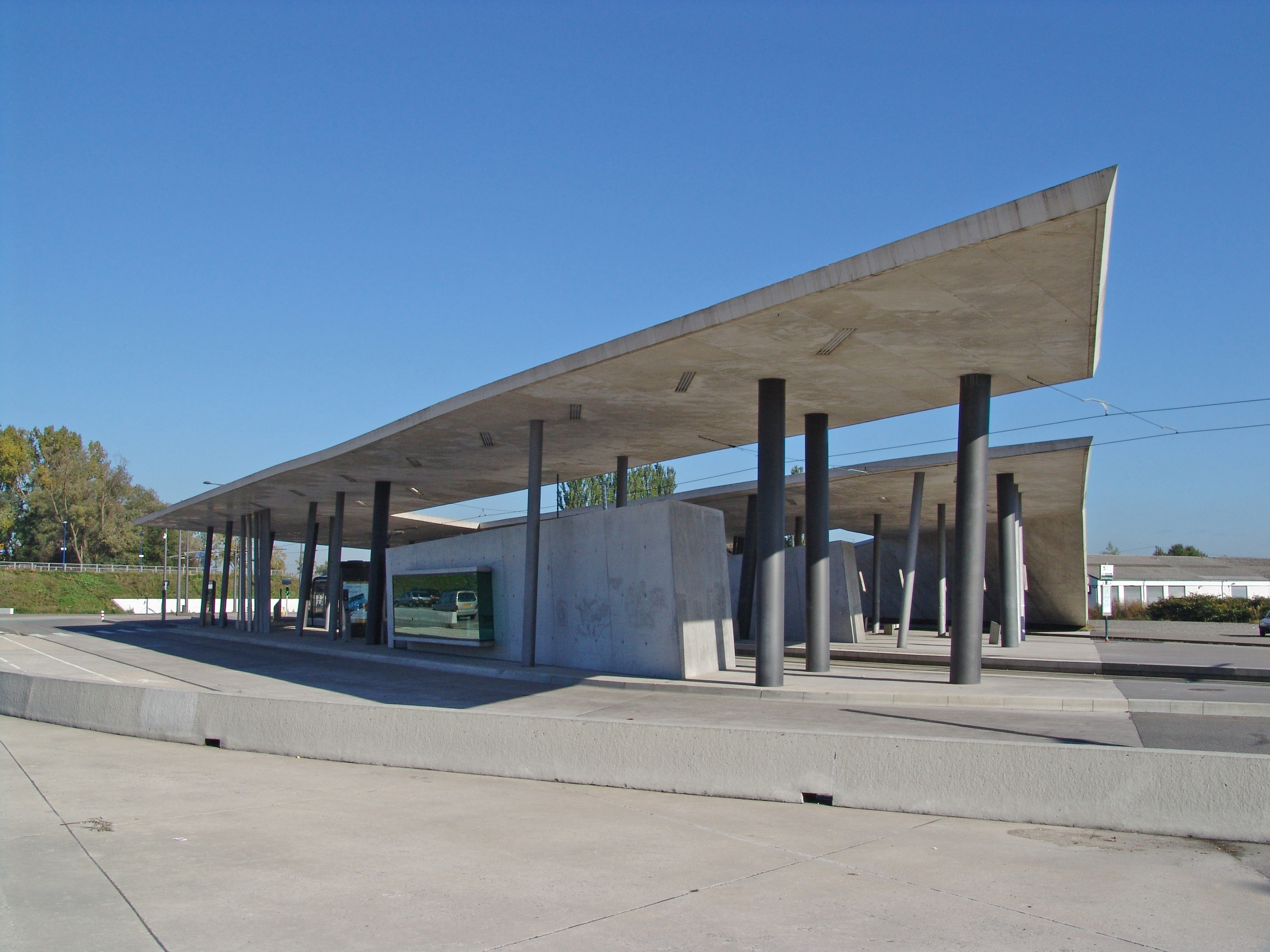
Hoenheim tram terminus by star architect Zaha Hadid

- The Saint-Jean vault, located beside the town hall, whose foundations date from the 12th century. A three floors square tower, shelters the heart directed according to the habit towards the East. Unfortunately the collapse of the frontage in 1969 needed a whole rebuilding of the building.
- The terminus of the tram (inauguration: 2001) by star architect Zaha Hadid, which in 2003 won the European Union Prize for Contemporary Architecture

== See also ==
- Communes of the Bas-Rhin department
