= Fort Rapp =

Coordinates: 48°38′25″N 7°45′23″E

- Fort Moltke
- Part of Strasbourg fortifications
- Reichstett
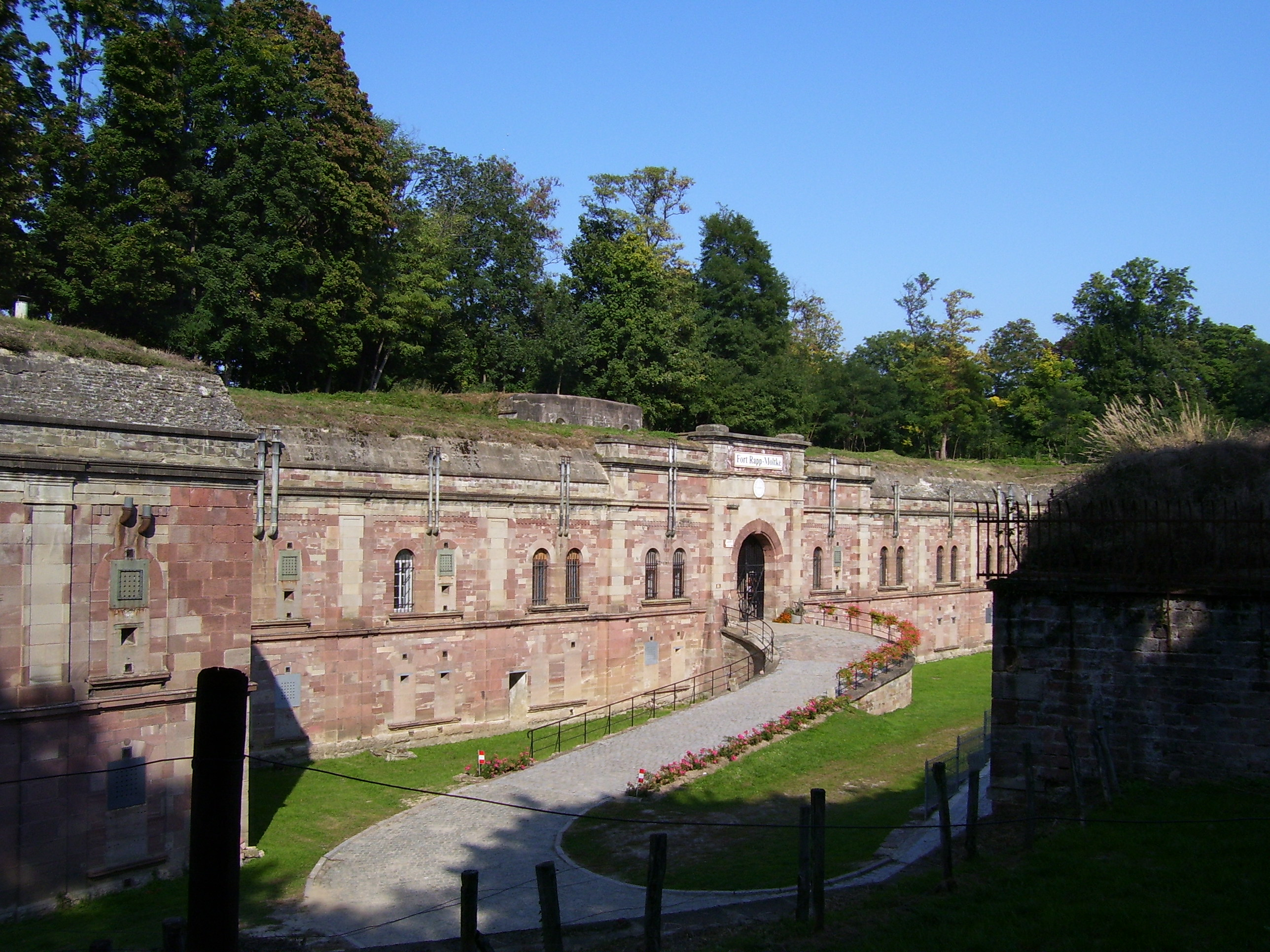
- Entrance to Fort Rapp

Site information
- Type: "Von Biehler" fort
- Controlled by: France
- Open to the public: mid April – late September

Site history
- Built: 1872–1874

Fort Rapp (once called Fort Moltke) is part of the 14 fortifications erected in Alsace by the Prussian general Von Moltke after the fall of Strasbourg in 1870 during the Franco-Prussian War and following the siege of Strasbourg. Built between 1872 and 1874 and inaugurated on 26 September 1874, it was part of the fortifications meant to protect the city from French attacks. Since 1918 and the return of Alsace-Lorraine to France, it is named after the French general Jean Rapp. The fort is located in Reichstett, a village situated 10 minutes north of Strasbourg and belonging to the Urban Community of Strasbourg. The fort contains 200 rooms and was able to host a garrison of 800 men. It was protected by 18 cannons of 90 – 150 mm.

== Gallery ==
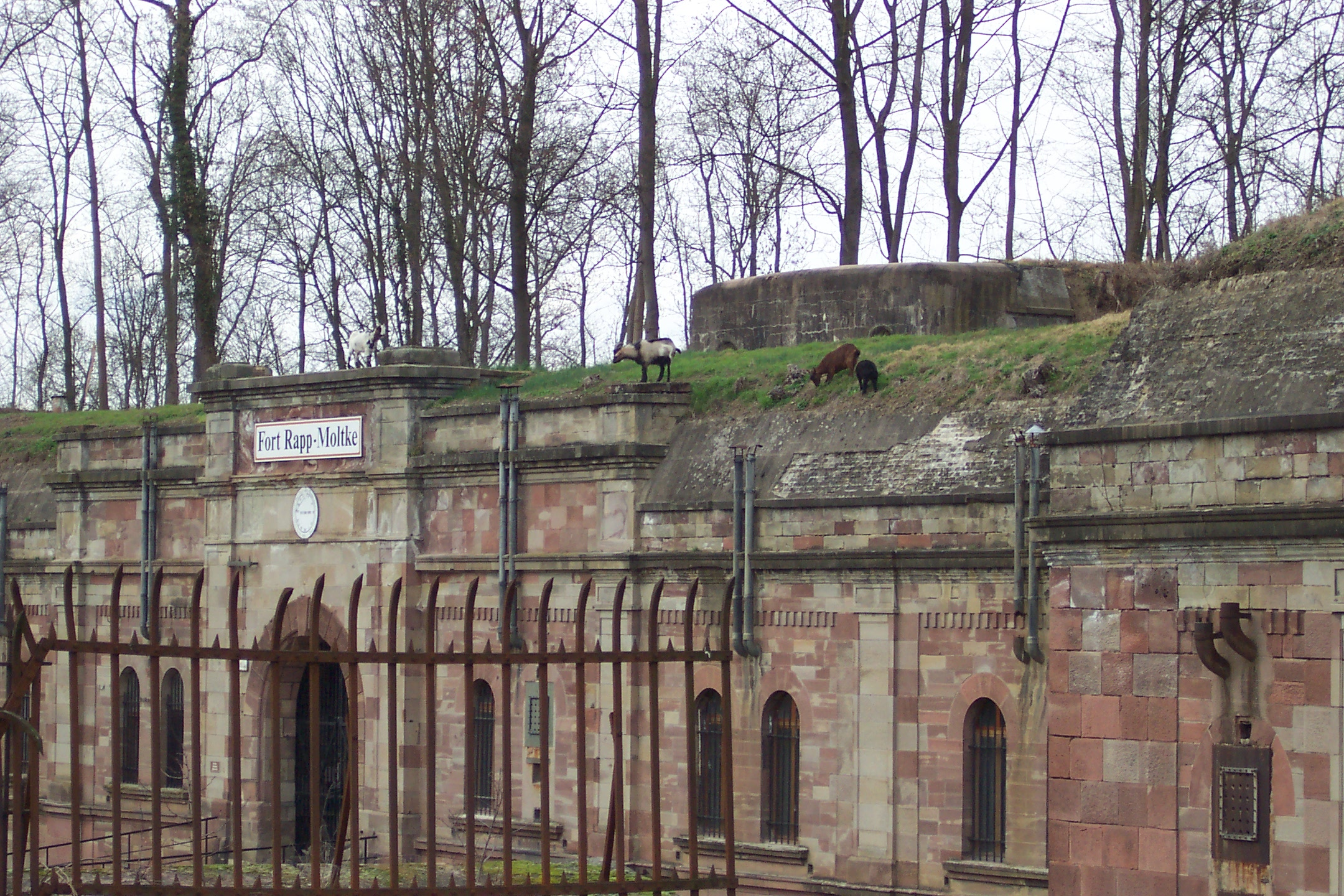
Façade

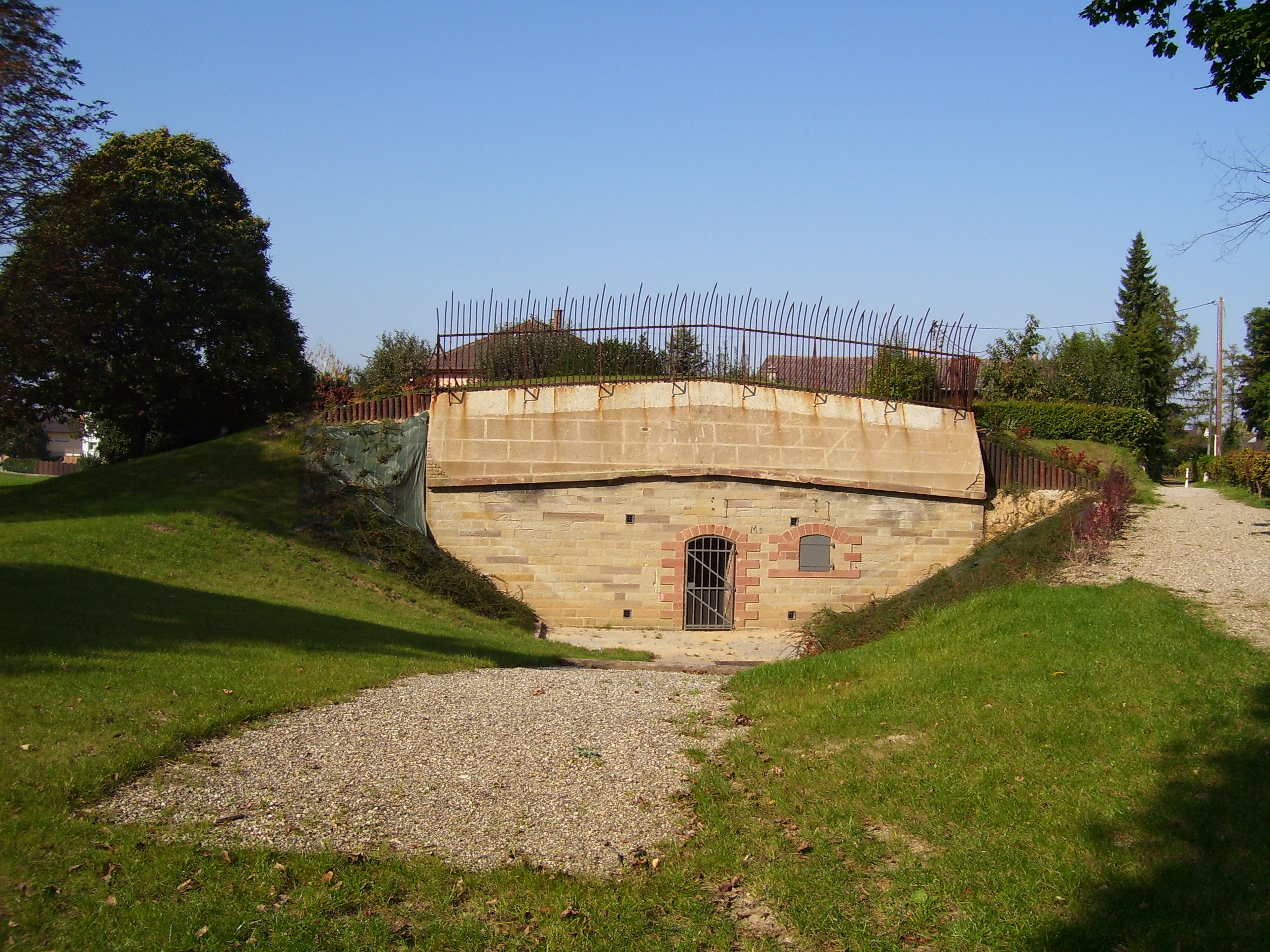
Side entrance

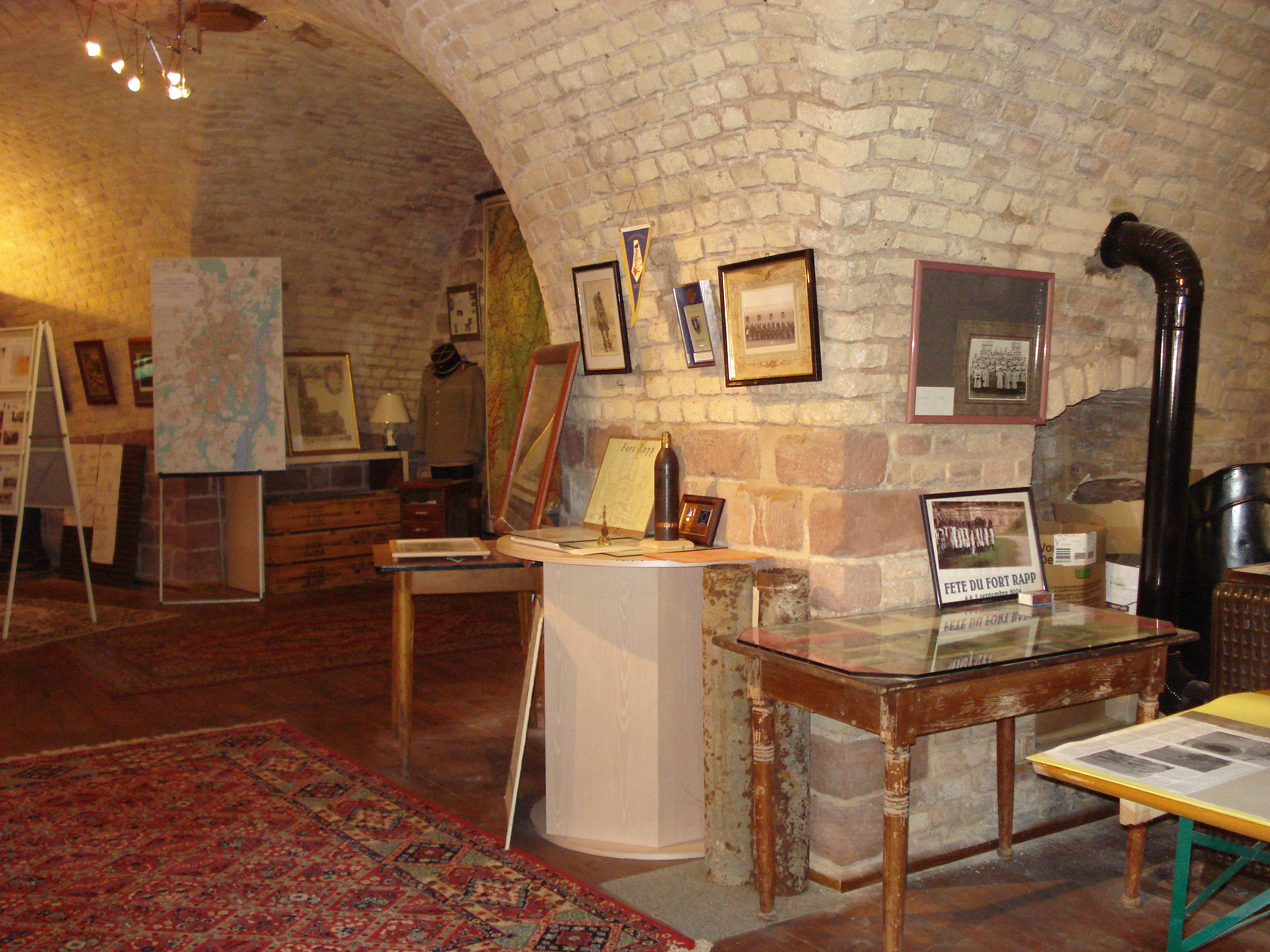
Interior of the museum (part 1)

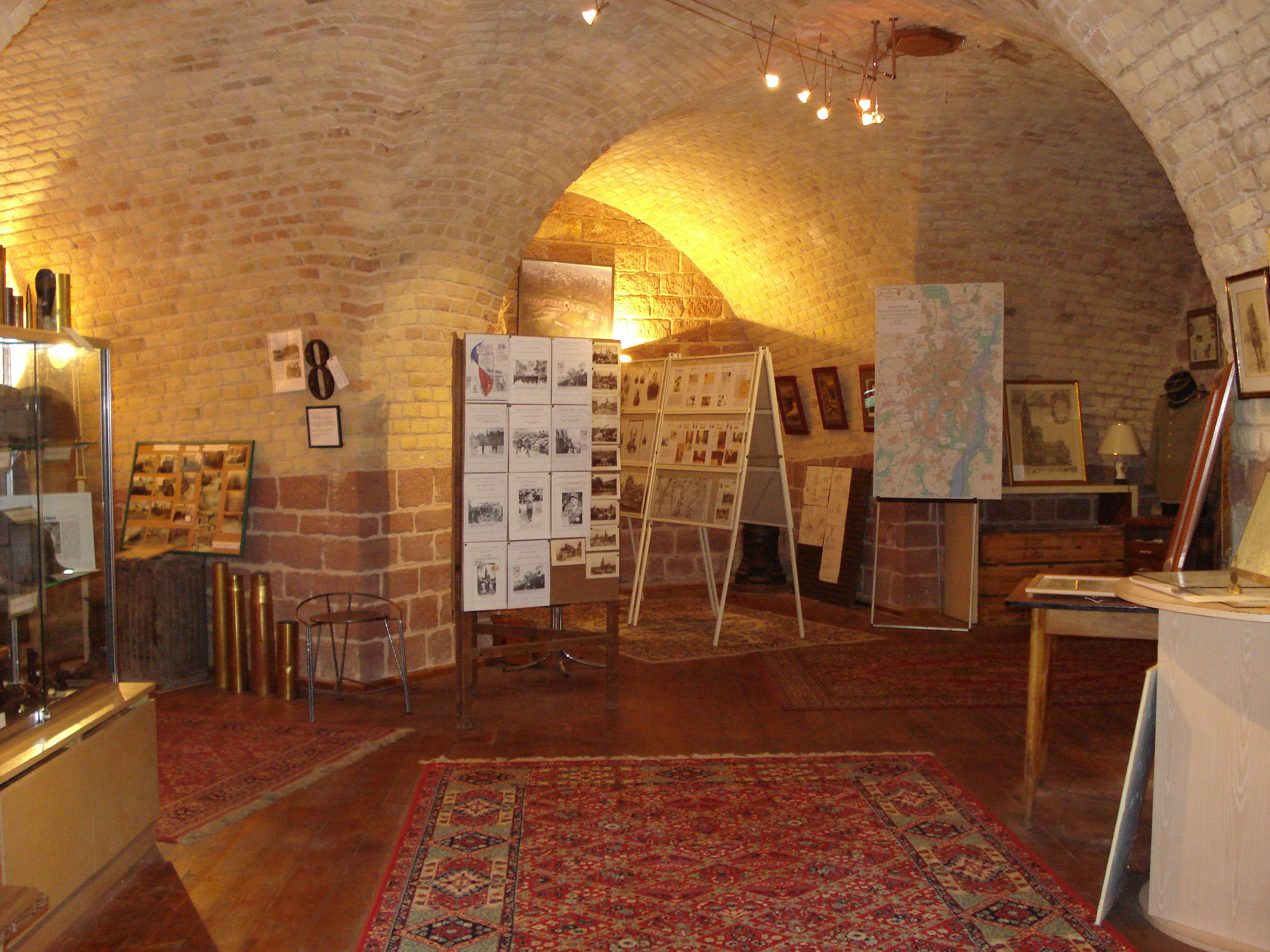
Interior of the museum (part 2)
