= Canton of Hœnheim =

Coordinates: 48.63°N 7.76°E

- Canton
- Situation of the canton of Hœnheim in the department of Bas-Rhin
- Country: France
- Region: Grand Est
- Department: Bas-Rhin
- No. of communes: {{{nbcomm}}}
- Population (2023): 54,632
- INSEE code: 6706

The canton of Hœnheim is an administrative division of the Bas-Rhin department, northeastern France. It was created at the French canton reorganisation which came into effect in March 2015. Its seat is in Hœnheim.

It consists of the following communes:

1. Eckbolsheim
2. Hœnheim
3. Lampertheim
4. Mittelhausbergen
5. Mundolsheim
6. Niederhausbergen
7. Oberhausbergen
8. Reichstett
9. Souffelweyersheim
10. Wolfisheim
