= Château de la Cour d'Angleterre =

Castle in Bas-Rhin, Alsace, France

- Bischheim in France
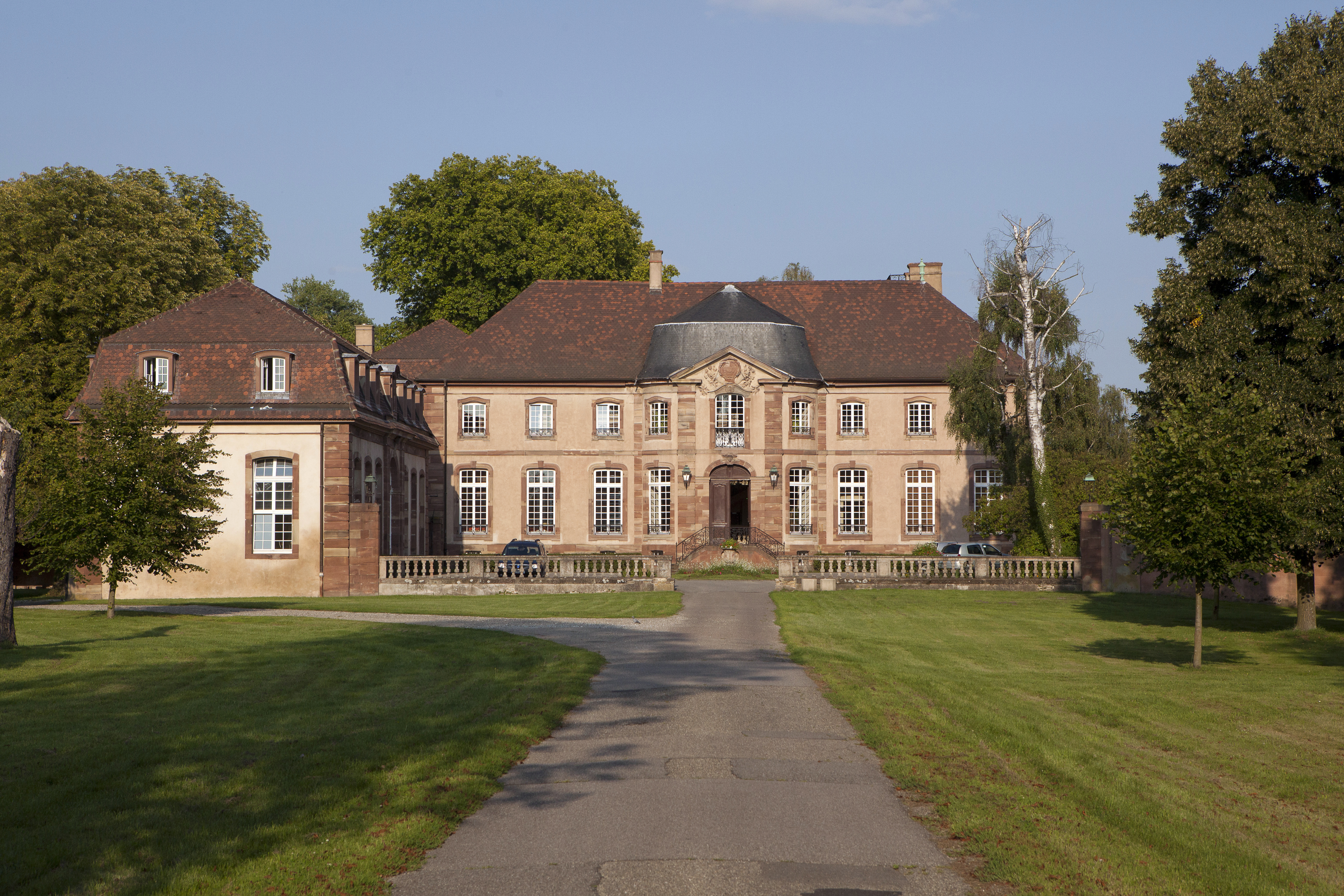

Location
- Coordinates: 48°37′52″N 7°47′56″E

The Château de la Cour d'Angleterre is a château in the commune of Bischheim, Bas-Rhin, Alsace, France.

It was built in 1751 and registered as a monument historique in 1995.

== Architecture ==
The house was built as a summer residence by Jean de Dietrich in the German Baroque and Classical French style. Noteworthy features of the château include the façade, roof, terraces and fences. Inside the building there are five panelled rooms on the ground floor and the main staircase. The outbuildings are 18th century, and their roofs and façades are of note. The château has substantial gardens.

== History ==
It was once owned by Conrad Alexandre Gérard de Rayneval and was damaged during World War II, but restored in 1947.

== Modern use ==
Since 1949, the building has been under the control of the Direction départementale des Affaires sanitaires et sociales and the criminal justice system, and has been used to house young people.
