= Battle of La Suffel =

Battle between French and Austrian forces in 1815

- Part of the Hundred Days
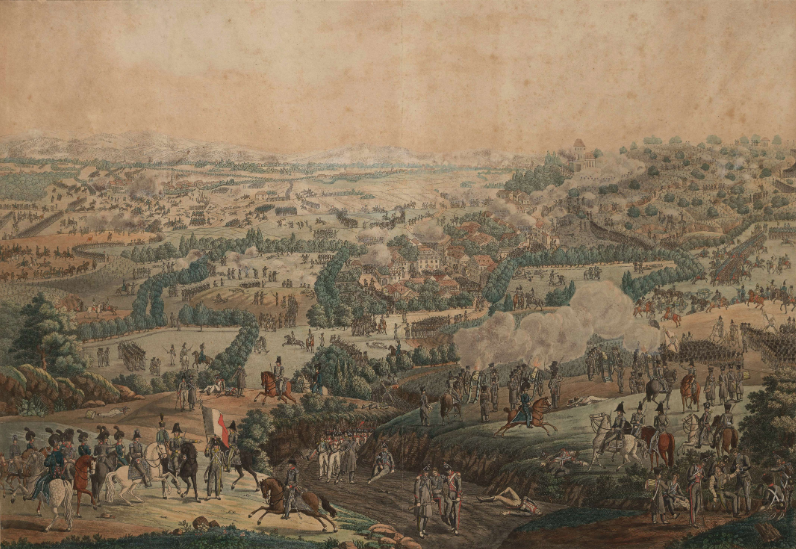
Date	28 June 1815
Location	Souffelweyersheim and Hoenheim, France 48.6356°N 7.7417°E
Result	French victory

Belligerents
(First French Empire) French Empire	Seventh Coalition: Austrian Empire; (Kingdom of Württemberg) Württemberg

Commanders and leaders
(First French Empire) Jean Rapp (First French Empire) Henri Rottembourg	(Kingdom of Württemberg) Crown Prince of Württemberg

Units involved
V Corps	III Corps of the Upper Rhine Army

Strength
About 20,000	About 40,000

Casualties and losses
~3,000	~75 officers and 2,050 men

The Battle of La Suffel was a French victory over Austrian forces of the Seventh Coalition and the last French pitched battle victory in the Napoleonic Wars. It was fought on 28 June 1815 at Souffelweyersheim and Hoenheim, near Strasbourg.

During the Hundred Days, General Jean Rapp rallied to Napoleon Bonaparte and was given command of the V Corps (also known as the Army of the Rhine), consisting of about 20,000 men. He was ordered to observe the border near Strasbourg, and to defend the Vosges. Ten days after Waterloo (in which his corps took no part), he met the III Corps of the Austrian Upper Rhine Army under the command of the Crown Prince of Württemberg near Strasbourg and defeated them at the Battle of La Suffel.

== Notes ==
Preceded by Battle of Rocheserviere	Napoleonic Wars; Battle of La Suffel	Succeeded by Battle of Rocquencourt
