= Eckbolsheim =

Eckbolsheim Eckelse (Alsatian)
- Commune
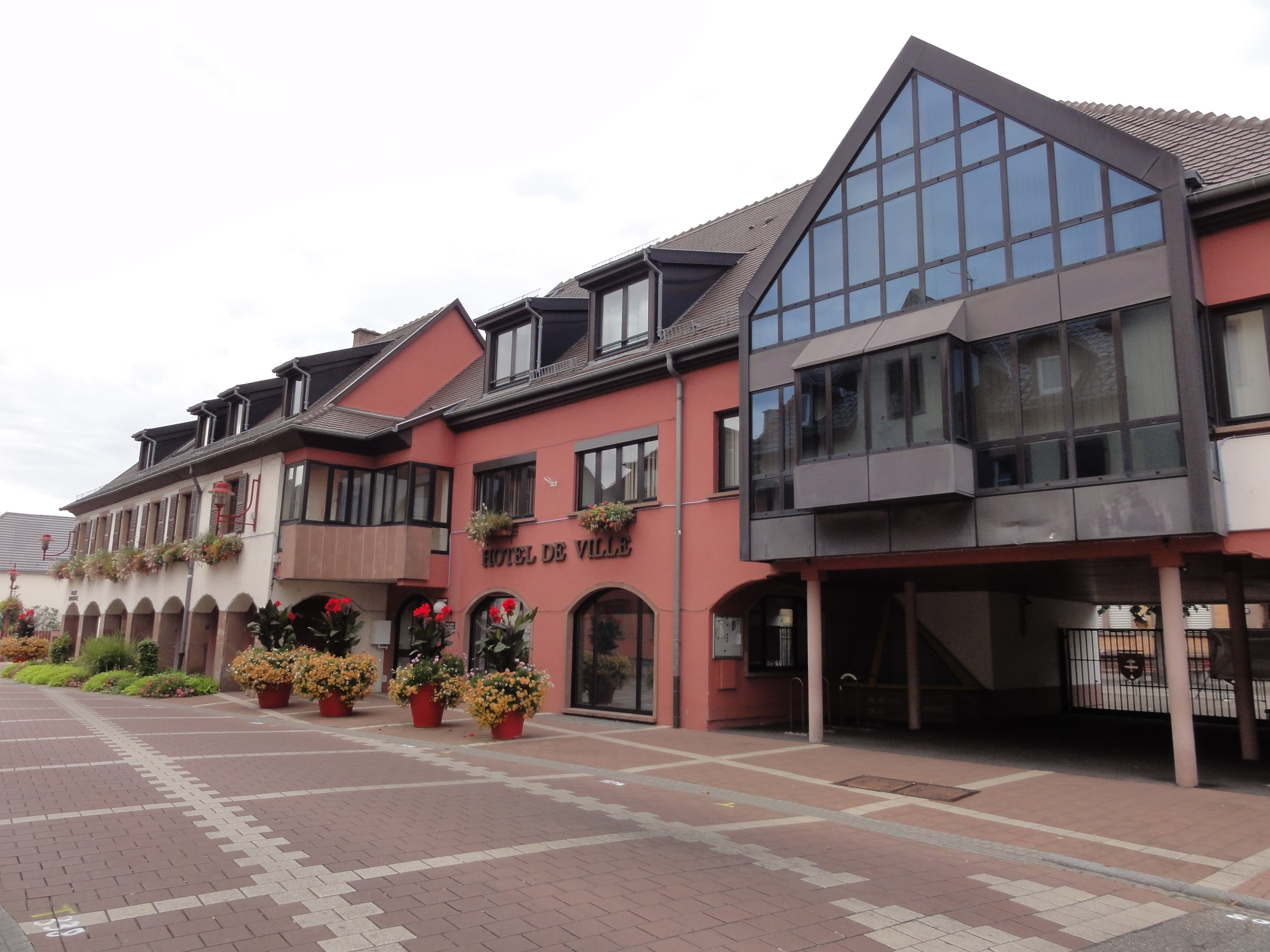
- The town hall in Eckbolsheim

- Coat of arms
- Location of Eckbolsheim
- Location within France Location within Grand Est
- Coordinates: 48°34′47″N 7°41′25″E
- Country: France
- Region: Grand Est
- Department: Bas-Rhin
- Arrondissement: Strasbourg
- Canton: Hœnheim
- Intercommunality: Strasbourg Eurométropole

Government
  - Mayor (2024–2026): Isabelle Halb
- Area^{1}: 5.34 km^{2} (2.06 sq mi)
- Highest elevation: 154 m (505 ft)
- Lowest elevation: 139 m (456 ft)
- Population (2023): 7,157
  - Density: 1,340/km^{2} (3,470/sq mi)
- Time zone: UTC+01:00 (CET)
  - Summer (DST): UTC+02:00 (CEST)
- INSEE/Postal code: 67118 /67201
- ^{1} French Land Register data, which excludes lakes, ponds, glaciers > 1 km^{2} (0.386 sq mi or 247 acres) and river estuaries.

Eckbolsheim (French pronunciation: [ɛkbɔlsajm]; Alsatian: Eckelse) is a commune, in the Bas-Rhin department in Grand Est in north-eastern France.

== Population ==
Historical population
Year	Pop.	±% p.a.
1968	4,288	—
1975	4,154	−0.45%
1982	4,104	−0.17%
1990	5,253	+3.13%
1999	5,937	+1.37%
2007	6,403	+0.95%
2012	6,619	+0.67%
2017	6,857	+0.71%
2023	7,157	+0.72%
Source: INSEE

== See also ==
- Communes of the Bas-Rhin department
