= Oberhausbergen =

Oberhausbergen Ìwerhüsbarje / Owerhüsbàrje (Alsatian)
- Commune
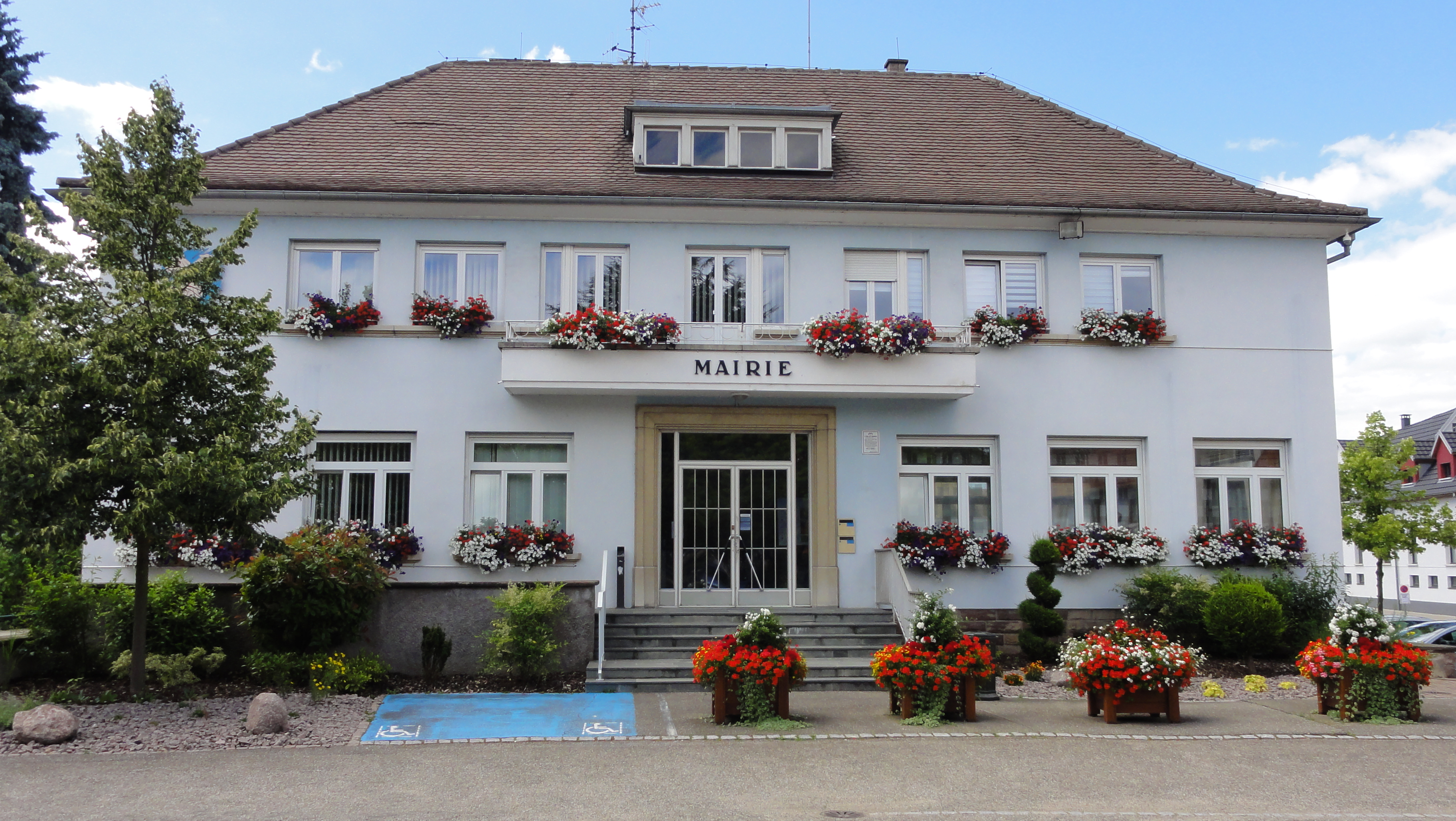
- The town hall in Oberhausbergen

- Coat of arms
- Location of Oberhausbergen
- Location within France Location within Grand Est
- Coordinates: 48°36′26″N 7°41′10″E
- Country: France
- Region: Grand Est
- Department: Bas-Rhin
- Arrondissement: Strasbourg
- Canton: Hœnheim
- Intercommunality: Eurométropole de Strasbourg

Government
  - Mayor (2020–2026): Cécile Delattre
- Area^{1}: 3.79 km^{2} (1.46 sq mi)
- Highest elevation: 187 m (614 ft)
- Lowest elevation: 143 m (469 ft)
- Population (2023): 5,857
  - Density: 1,550/km^{2} (4,000/sq mi)
- Time zone: UTC+01:00 (CET)
  - Summer (DST): UTC+02:00 (CEST)
- INSEE/Postal code: 67343 /67205
- ^{1} French Land Register data, which excludes lakes, ponds, glaciers > 1 km^{2} (0.386 sq mi or 247 acres) and river estuaries.

Oberhausbergen (Alsatian: Ìwerhüsbarje or Owerhüsbàrje) is a commune in the Bas-Rhin department in Grand Est in north-eastern France. It is a northwestern suburb of Strasbourg.

== Population ==
Historical population
Year	Pop.	±% p.a.
1968	1,818	—
1975	2,103	+2.10%
1982	2,014	−0.62%
1990	3,020	+5.19%
1999	4,518	+4.58%
2007	4,546	+0.08%
2012	4,818	+1.17%
2017	5,381	+2.23%
2023	5,857	+1.42%
Source: INSEE

== See also ==
- Communes of the Bas-Rhin department
