= Bischheim, Bas-Rhin =

Bischheim Bésche (Alsatian)
- Commune
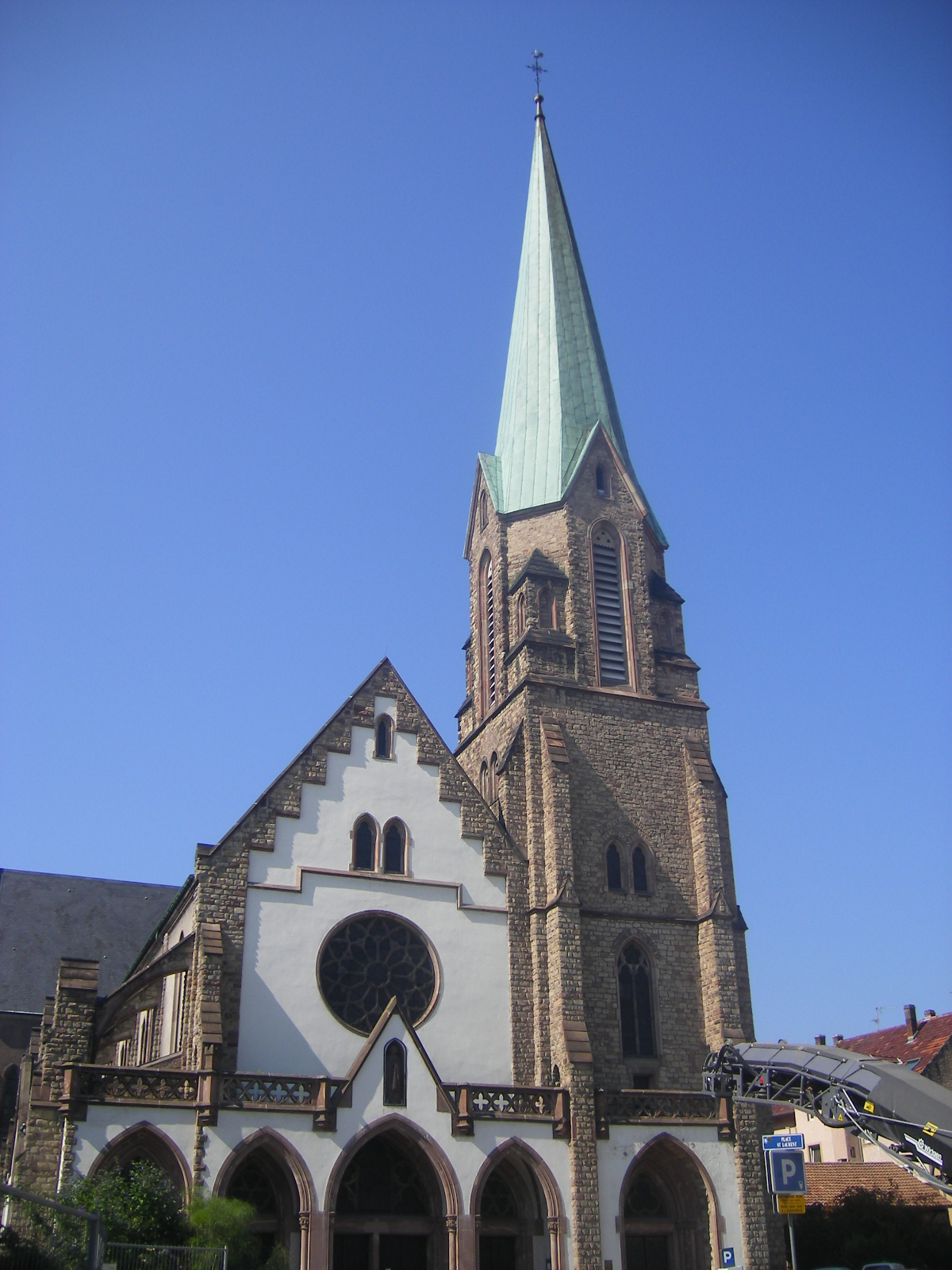
- The church in Bischheim

- Coat of arms
- Location of Bischheim
- Location within France Location within Grand Est
- Coordinates: 48°36′52″N 7°45′10″E
- Country: France
- Region: Grand Est
- Department: Bas-Rhin
- Arrondissement: Strasbourg
- Canton: Schiltigheim
- Intercommunality: Strasbourg Eurométropole

Government
  - Mayor (2020–2026): Jean-Louis Hoerlé (LR)
- Area^{1}: 4.41 km^{2} (1.70 sq mi)
- Elevation: 140 m (460 ft)
- Highest elevation: 150 m (490 ft)
- Lowest elevation: 132 m (433 ft)
- Population (2023): 18,558
  - Density: 4,210/km^{2} (10,900/sq mi)
- Time zone: UTC+01:00 (CET)
  - Summer (DST): UTC+02:00 (CEST)
- INSEE/Postal code: 67043 /67800
- ^{1} French Land Register data, which excludes lakes, ponds, glaciers > 1 km^{2} (0.386 sq mi or 247 acres) and river estuaries.

Bischheim (French pronunciation: [biʃaim]; Alsatian: Bésche) is a commune in the Bas-Rhin department and Grand Est region of north-eastern France.

== Geography ==
The town is bordered by Hoenheim, Strasbourg, Schiltigheim, and Niederhausbergen. It lies on the Ill and the canal between the Rhine and the Rhône (Rhône–Rhine Canal).

== Population ==
Historical population

Year	Pop.	±% p.a.
1793	1,423	—
1800	1,859	+3.89%
1806	1,822	−0.33%
1821	2,088	+0.91%
1831	2,347	+1.18%
1836	2,718	+2.98%
1841	2,692	−0.19%
1846	2,929	+1.70%
1851	3,137	+1.38%
1856	3,190	+0.34%
1861	3,401	+1.29%
1866	3,624	+1.28%
1871	3,860	+1.27%
1875	4,112	+1.59%
1880	4,931	+3.70%
1885	5,340	+1.61%
1890	6,045	+2.51%
1895	6,722	+2.15%
1900	7,764	+2.92%

Year	Pop.	±% p.a.
1905	9,012	+3.03%
1910	9,865	+1.83%
1921	9,635	−0.21%
1926	10,240	+1.23%
1931	10,955	+1.36%
1936	11,287	+0.60%
1946	10,740	−0.50%
1954	11,430	+0.78%
1962	12,355	+0.98%
1968	14,383	+2.57%
1975	14,985	+0.59%
1982	16,215	+1.13%
1990	16,308	+0.07%
1999	16,763	+0.31%
2007	17,739	+0.71%
2012	17,491	−0.28%
2017	17,093	−0.46%
2023	18,558	+1.38%

Source: EHESS and INSEE (1968-2023)

== See also ==
- Château de la Cour d'Angleterre
- Communes of the Bas-Rhin department
