= Jean Rapp =

French general (1771–1821)

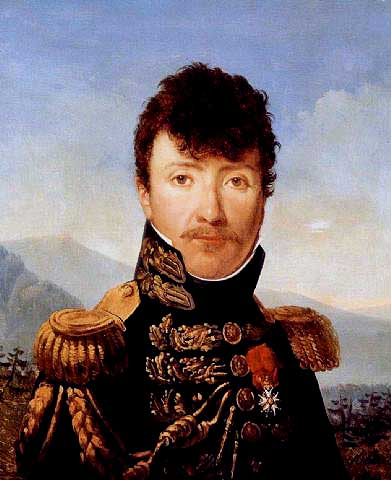
- Born: 27 April 1771; Colmar, Kingdom of France
- Died: 8 November 1821 (aged 50); Rheinweiler, Grand Duchy of Baden
- Military career
- Allegiance: Kingdom of France; Kingdom of the French; French First Republic; First French Empire; Bourbon Restoration
- Service years: 1788–1815
- Rank: Divisional general
- Commands: V Corps; X Corps
- Conflicts: French Revolutionary Wars; War of the Second Coalition; French invasion of Egypt and Syria; Napoleonic Wars; War of the Third Coalition; Battle of Austerlitz; War of the Fourth Coalition; Battle of Jena–Auerstedt; Battle of Golymin (WIA); War of the Fifth Coalition; Battle of Aspern–Essling; French invasion of Russia; Battle of Borodino (WIA); Battle of Berezina (WIA); War of the Sixth Coalition; Siege of Danzig; Hundred Days; Battle of La Suffel

General Count Jean Rapp (French pronunciation: [ʒɑ̃ ʁap]; 27 April 1771 – 8 November 1821) was a French Army officer during the French Revolutionary Wars and the Napoleonic Wars and twice governor of the Free City of Danzig. He served as Aide-de-camp to French Generals Louis Desaix and later Napoleon Bonaparte, whose life he saved on multiple occasions.

== Early life ==
Rapp was born the son of the janitor of the town hall of Colmar, then located in the Old Customs House. He began theological studies to become a Lutheran clergyman, but with his build and heated character, he was better suited to the military, which he joined in March 1788.

== Career ==
From the rank of a regular of the chasseurs de Cévennes, he worked his way up through his courage and character to the rank of a division general and adjutant of Napoleon Bonaparte. As a lieutenant, his reputation grew through his impetuousness as well as the wounds he received in battle. He was made aide-de-camp of Louis Desaix, who named him captain and took him to Egypt, where Rapp distinguished himself at Sediman, capturing an enemy battery. For that, he was given a squadron and later a brigade by Napoleon.

After the Egyptian campaign, Rapp remained under the command of Desaix until the latter's death at Marengo on 14 June 1800. He then became aide-de-camp of Napoleon, then the First Consul, a post he held until 1814. Under this title, he was charged with many confidential missions by Napoleon in the Vendée, Switzerland and Belgium. In 1803 he was promoted to brigadier general and in December 1805, he led a memorable attack at Austerlitz, when he charged at the head of two squadrons each of the Mounted Chasseurs and the Mounted Grenadiers of the Guard and the Guard Mameluks and decimated the Chevalier Guards of the Russian Imperial Guard. Promoted to division general, he later fought at Jena on 14 October 1806 and was wounded at Golymin.

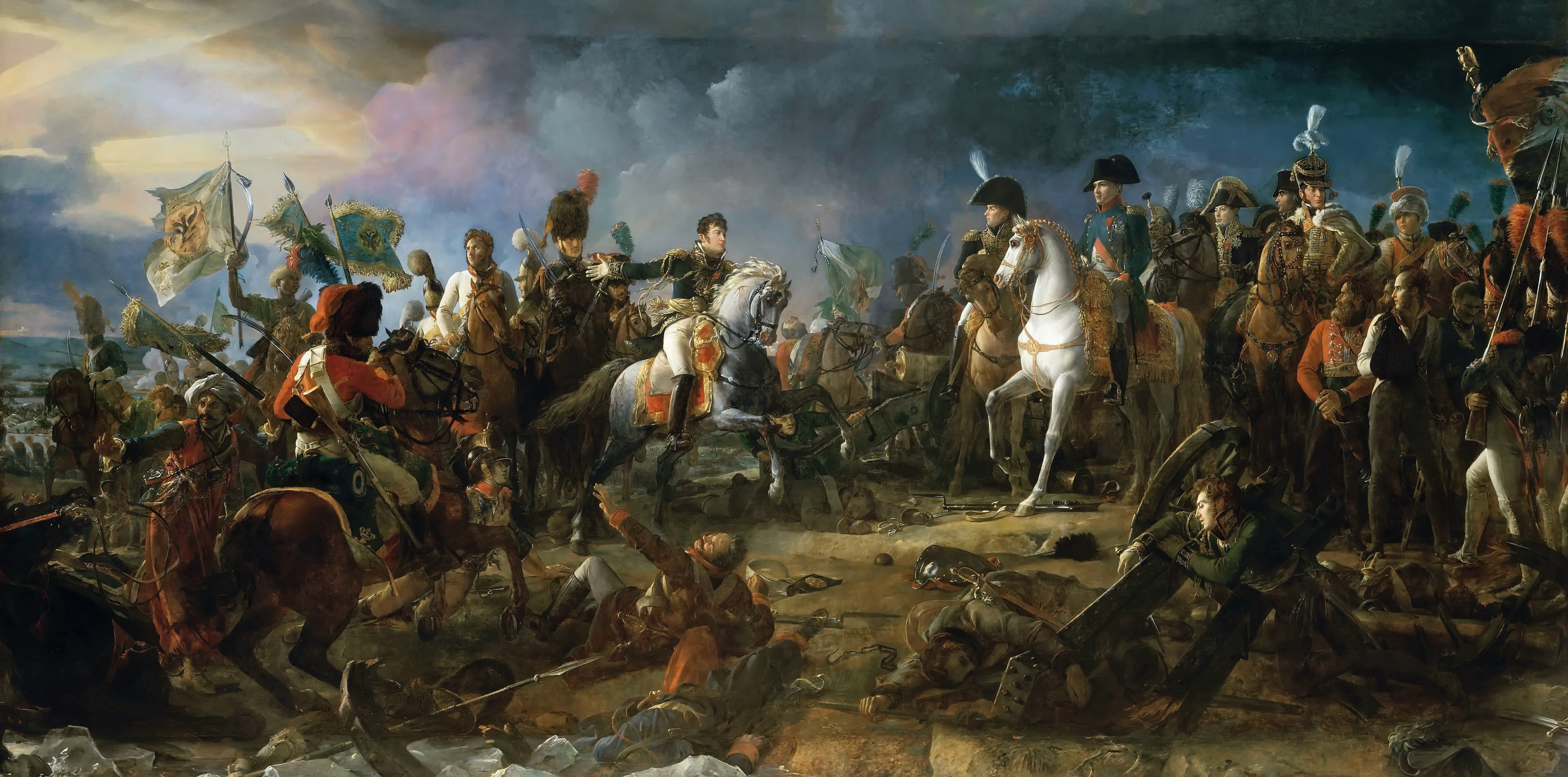
Rapp presents captured Prince Repnin-Volkonsky during the Battle of Austerlitz.

In 1808, Rapp supported the establishment of the Lutheran Consistorial Church of Paris. After the closure of the Swedish Embassy chapel in 1806, the city's Lutheran community petitioned Napoleon for a place of worship, citing some 10,000 Lutherans in Paris. With Rapp's support, Napoleon established the consistory by decree and assigned it the Billettes church.

Rapp stayed in the line of fire: at Essling, he led the front of his fusiliers of the Garde impériale and carried the day; during the signing of the Treaty of Schönbrunn, he averted a planned attempt on Napoleon by the young Friedrich Staps. Being fluent in German, Rapp acted as a translator for Staps as Napoleon personally interrogated Staps. In Russia, he was wounded by four bullets at the Battle of Borodino on 5–7 September 1812. He saved Napoleon's life a second time by repelling an attack of Don Cossacks near Maloyaroslavets and was again wounded at the passage of the Berezina, fighting alongside Marshal Ney in the rear guard. As governor of Danzig, Rapp held the town for a year with X Corps after the Grande Armée left Russia.

During the Hundred Days, Rapp rallied to Napoleon and was given command of V Corps, consisting of about 20,000 men. It was used to observe the border near Strasbourg, and to defend the Vosges. Ten days after the Battle of Waterloo (in which his corps took no part), he met some Seventh Coalition forces of Austrians and Württembergs under Crown Price William of Württemberg near Strasbourg and defeated them at the Battle of La Suffel. After the Waterloo Campaign, he offered his resignation several times, but was reinstated. Later, Rapp became a deputy of the department of Haut-Rhin and was appointed as treasurer of King Louis XVIII in 1819.

== Death and legacy ==
He died in Rheinweiler in Baden. His hometown of Colmar built a statue in his honour on the Champ de Mars with the inscription Ma parole est sacrée (my word of honour is sacred). Rapp's heart is kept in a shrine at the Église Saint-Matthieu in Colmar.

In 1823, two years after Rapp's death, his unfinished memoirs were published by his family as Memoirs of General Count Rapp, First Aide-de-Camp to Napoleon. Rapp had died before completing the manuscript, which was subsequently edited for publication.

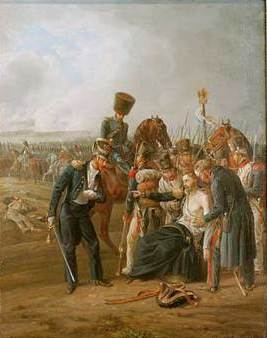
The wounded General Jean Rapp in the Battle of Borodino

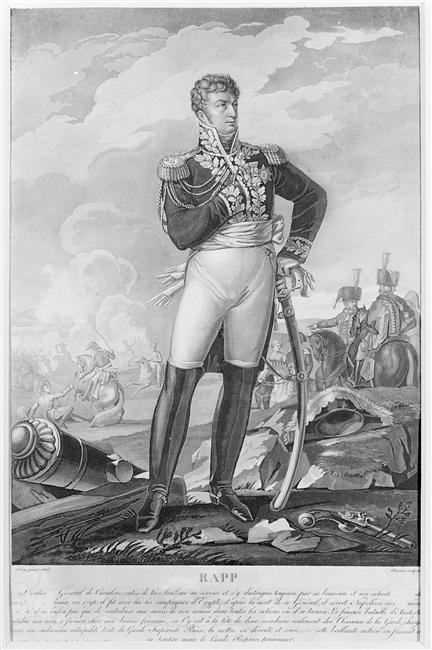
Jean Rapp Lithograph

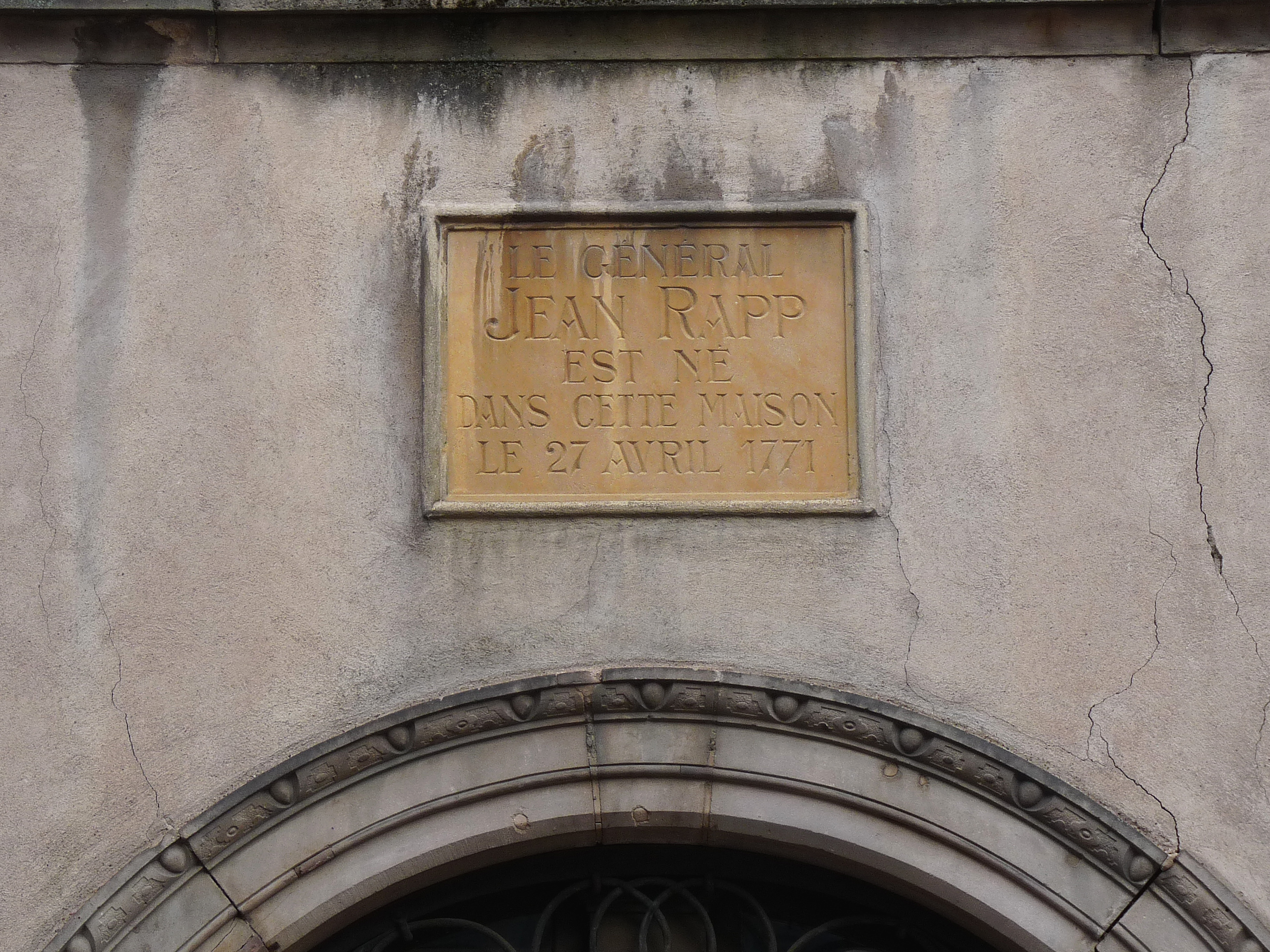
Commemorative plaque on the Old Customs House

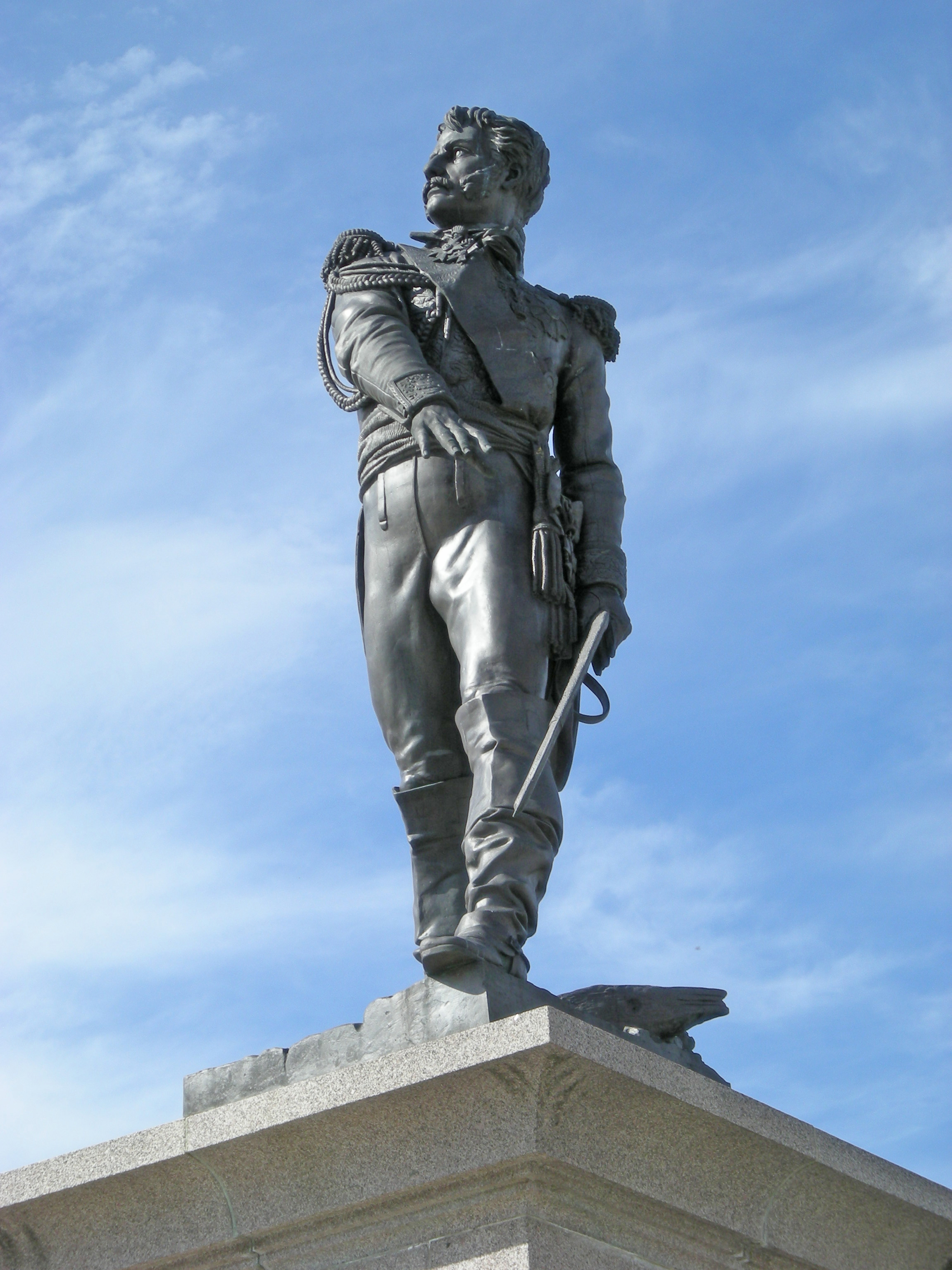
Rapp Statue at Colmar

== See also ==
- Fort Rapp
