= La Wantzenau =

- Commune
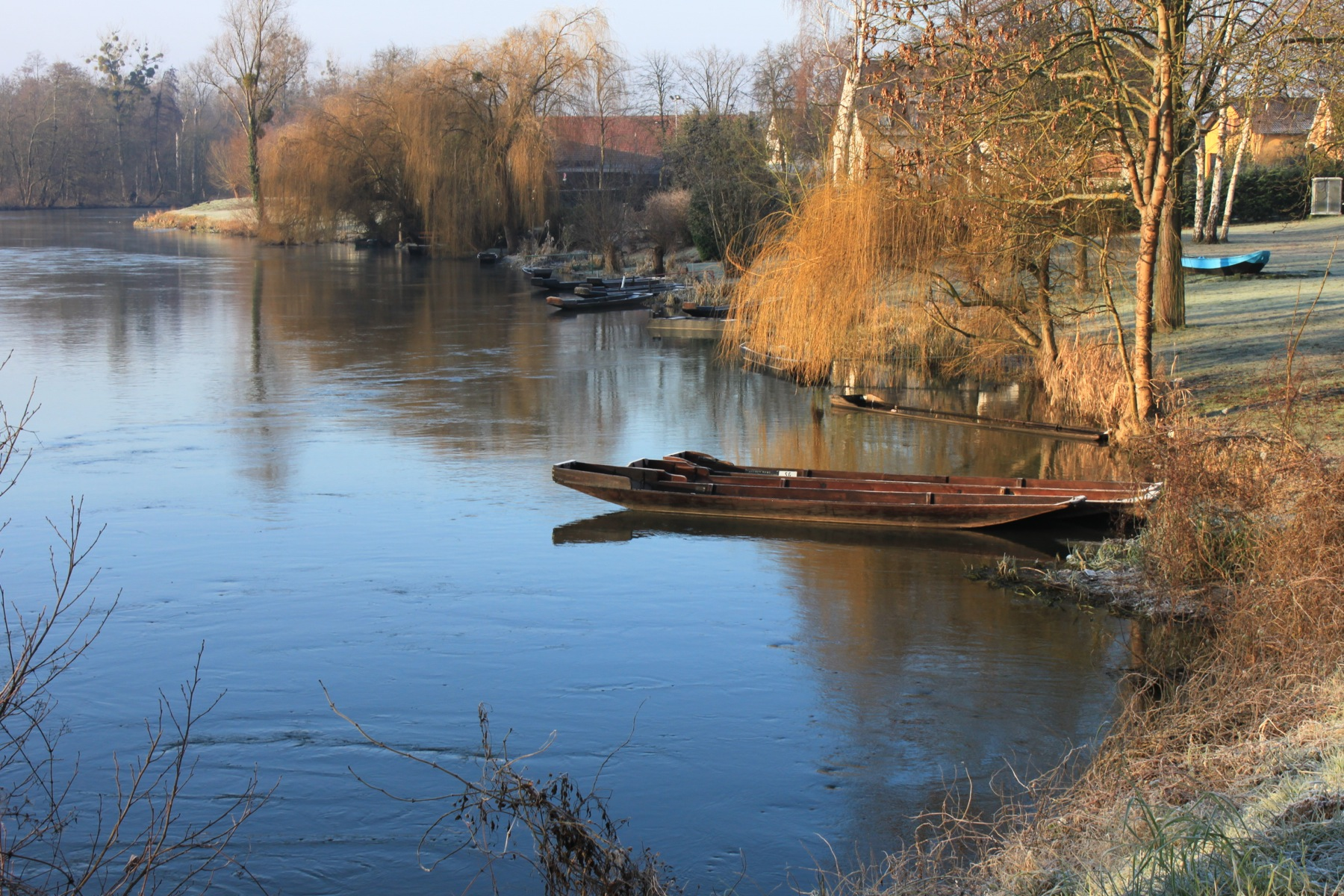
- The Ill River in La Wantzenau

- Coat of arms
- Location of La Wantzenau
- Location within France Location within Grand Est
- Coordinates: 48°39′32″N 7°49′45″E
- Country: France
- Region: Grand Est
- Department: Bas-Rhin
- Arrondissement: Strasbourg
- Canton: Brumath
- Intercommunality: Strasbourg Eurométropole

Government
  - Mayor (2020–2026): Michèle Kannengieser
- Area^{1}: 25.39 km^{2} (9.80 sq mi)
- Elevation: 130 m (430 ft)
- Highest elevation: 135 m (443 ft)
- Lowest elevation: 128 m (420 ft)
- Population (2023): 5,864
  - Density: 231.0/km^{2} (598.2/sq mi)
- Time zone: UTC+01:00 (CET)
  - Summer (DST): UTC+02:00 (CEST)
- INSEE/Postal code: 67519 /67610
- ^{1} French Land Register data, which excludes lakes, ponds, glaciers > 1 km^{2} (0.386 sq mi or 247 acres) and river estuaries.

La Wantzenau (French pronunciation: [lavãtsəno]; German: Wanzenau) is a commune in the Bas-Rhin department in Grand Est in north-eastern France.

== Location ==
The town is located 12 km northeast of Strasbourg. It is the last village along the Ill river before it joins the Rhine a few kilometres downstream. The village limits touch the border with Germany, although the closest bridge across the Rhine is in Gambsheim, 10 km north of the village. It is one of the villages of greater Strasbourg (Strasbourg Eurométropole). The village centre and the recently developed area, Le Golf, are on the north side of the river Ill with the neighbourhood of Le Woerthel on the south side.

== History ==
The terrain around the village is very flat and marshy. In fact the ending "au" in the name denotes in Alsatian a town which is subject to seasonal flooding. The town was probably founded in the 8th century as a fishing outpost of Honau, a nearby monastery founded by Irish monks on an island in the Rhine river. The name does not appear in any records until 1331 as "Wanzenowe". It was granted status as a parish by the bishop-prince of Strasbourg in 1468. During the Thirty Years' War, in the early 17th century, the town was completely wiped out by Swedish troops. It was also badly damaged during both World Wars. There are many signs of the town's experience with war. Rue Albert Zimmer is named for a soldier who became a local hero fighting with General Leclerc in World War II, only to be killed in fighting near Strasbourg in 1944. The town is dotted with bunkers and blockhouses from the Maginot Line, especially in the La Wantzenau forest. There is also a German-made bunker visible in the house on the corner of the rue Leh and the rue du Moulin.

=== Today ===
Today, the town has preserved many 18th-century half-timbered Alsatian-style houses. The town has graded a promenade along the Ill river. It is connected to a network of bicycle lanes including the "Piste des Forts" which circles greater Strasbourg, and a path through the La Wantzenau forest through La Robertsau and into downtown Strasbourg. La Wantzenau is well known in the region for the high number of fine restaurants including Le Relais de la Poste, Les Semailles and Le Moulin de la Wantzenau, the last vestiges of a now closed cooking school in the town. The town is twinned with Saint-Yrieix-la-Perche in Haute-Vienne because the population of La Wantzenau was evacuated there at the start of the war with Germany in 1939.

La Wantzenau is a bedroom community of Strasbourg. It combines the advantages of village life with individual houses while still being part of the CUS with train and bus transportation to the centre of Strasbourg. 73% of the working population works outside of the village.

The centre of the town has several commercial establishments including a grocery store, two bakeries and two tobacconists. There are also several public buildings including a post office, the town hall, the Foyer Culturel, the Jean-Claude Klein sports complex, a football stadium, two pre-schools, a primary school, and a junior highschool.

== Demographics ==
Historical population
Year	Pop.	±% p.a.
1968	3,726	—
1975	4,216	+1.78%
1982	4,084	−0.45%
1990	4,394	+0.92%
1999	5,462	+2.45%
2007	5,859	+0.88%
2012	5,773	−0.30%
2017	5,841	+0.23%
2023	5,864	+0.07%
Source: INSEE

== See also ==
- Communes of the Bas-Rhin department
