= Reichstett =

Reichstett Richstett (Alsatian)
- Commune
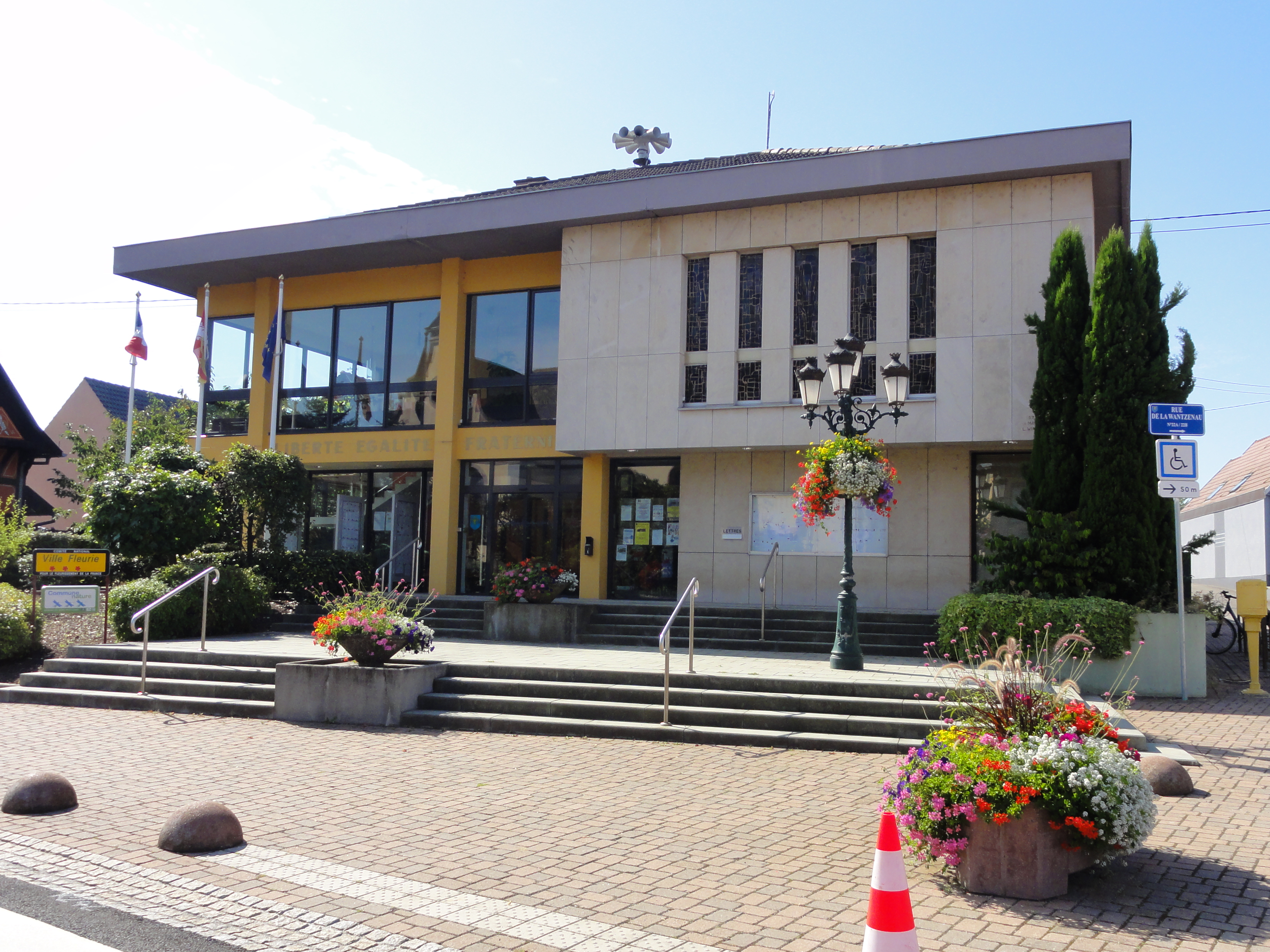
- The town hall in Reichstett

- Coat of arms
- Location of Reichstett
- Location within France Location within Grand Est
- Coordinates: 48°38′47″N 7°45′11″E
- Country: France
- Region: Grand Est
- Department: Bas-Rhin
- Arrondissement: Strasbourg
- Canton: Hœnheim
- Intercommunality: Strasbourg Eurométropole

Government
  - Mayor (2020–2026): Georges Schuler
- Area^{1}: 7.61 km^{2} (2.94 sq mi)
- Highest elevation: 149 m (489 ft)
- Lowest elevation: 133 m (436 ft)
- Population (2023): 4,732
  - Density: 622/km^{2} (1,610/sq mi)
- Time zone: UTC+01:00 (CET)
  - Summer (DST): UTC+02:00 (CEST)
- INSEE/Postal code: 67389 /67116
- ^{1} French Land Register data, which excludes lakes, ponds, glaciers > 1 km^{2} (0.386 sq mi or 247 acres) and river estuaries.

Reichstett (French pronunciation: [ʁajʃtɛt]; Alsatian: Richstett) is a commune in the Bas-Rhin department in Grand Est in north-eastern France. Fort Rapp is located here.

== Population ==
Historical population
Year	Pop.	±% p.a.
1968	2,548	—
1975	3,597	+5.05%
1982	4,464	+3.13%
1990	4,640	+0.48%
1999	4,882	+0.57%
2007	4,512	−0.98%
2012	4,404	−0.48%
2017	4,418	+0.06%
2023	4,732	+1.15%
Source: INSEE

== See also ==
- Communes of the Bas-Rhin department
