= Auenheim =

Commune in Bas-Rhin, France

- Part of Rountzenheim-Auenheim
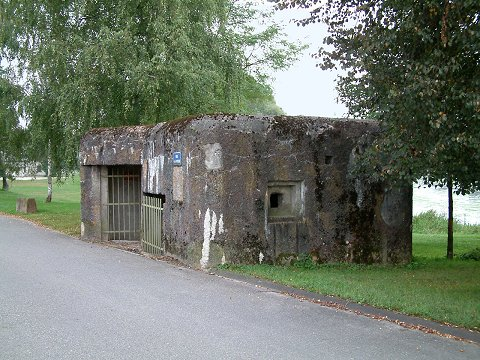
- Blockhouse 1 in Auenheim

- Coat of arms
- Location of Auenheim
- Location within France Location within Grand Est
- Coordinates: 48°48′44″N 8°00′38″E
- Country: France
- Region: Grand Est
- Department: Bas-Rhin
- Arrondissement: Haguenau-Wissembourg
- Canton: Bischwiller
- Commune: Rountzenheim-Auenheim
- Area^{1}: 4.24 km^{2} (1.64 sq mi)
- Highest elevation: 121 m (397 ft)
- Lowest elevation: 116 m (381 ft)
- Population (2022): 907
  - Density: 214/km^{2} (554/sq mi)
- Time zone: UTC+01:00 (CET)
  - Summer (DST): UTC+02:00 (CEST)
- Postal code: 67480
- ^{1} French Land Register data, which excludes lakes, ponds, glaciers > 1 km^{2} (0.386 sq mi or 247 acres) and river estuaries.

Auenheim (French pronunciation: [auənaim]; Alsatian: Auenem) is a former commune in the Bas-Rhin department in the Grand Est region of north-eastern France. On 1 January 2019, it was merged into the new commune Rountzenheim-Auenheim.

== Geography ==
Auenheim is located some 15 km east of Haguenau and 13 km north-east of Bischwiller. Access to the commune is by the road D468 from Rœschwoog in the north-east, which passes through the north of the commune and the village before continuing to Stattmatten in the south. The D463 branches off the D468 in the north of the commune and goes west to Rountzenheim. The TER Strasbourg-Lauterbourg railway passes through the village and there is a station in the commune which, however, appears to be disused. There is a belt of forest through the centre of the commune (the Biergrund) and a large forest in the south-east of the commune (the Unterwald) with substantial urbanisation in the north-west of the commune with the rest farmland.

The Moder river comes from the south and passes through the south-west then the centre of the commune before forming half of the eastern border and continuing east to join the Rhine at Neuhaeusel. There is also a large reservoir in the north of the commune.

== Toponymy ==
According to the Cassini Map of 1750 Auen- was spelt Augenheim which in modern German would mean "of the eye" + -heim meaning "hamlet or village".

The suffix -heim indicates a Frankish origin since before the first creation of villages by the Alemanni. -heim signified a "hamlet" or a group of houses in French from which came the Alemannic hüs from which comes haus which is "house" in German.

In 1359 the village was called Oweheim and in 1596 it was Awenheim.

=== Heraldry ===
Arms of Auenheim	Blazon: Argent, a Roman letter M surmounted by a crossette paty and between three crossettes at dexter, sinister and base all in Sable.

== Administration ==
List of Successive Mayors

From	To	Name	Party	Position
2001	2019	Joseph Ludwig		

== Demography ==
The inhabitants of the commune are known as Auenheimois or Auenheimoises in French.

Historical population

Year	Pop.	±% p.a.
1793	337	—
1800	251	−4.12%
1806	355	+5.95%
1821	549	+2.95%
1831	535	−0.26%
1836	506	−1.11%
1841	474	−1.30%
1846	531	+2.30%
1851	539	+0.30%
1856	459	−3.16%
1861	443	−0.71%
1866	447	+0.18%
1871	437	−0.45%
1875	440	+0.17%
1880	478	+1.67%
1885	474	−0.17%
1890	448	−1.12%
1895	464	+0.70%

Year	Pop.	±% p.a.
1900	451	−0.57%
1905	432	−0.86%
1910	453	+0.95%
1921	440	−0.26%
1926	433	−0.32%
1931	455	+1.00%
1936	500	+1.90%
1946	496	−0.08%
1954	467	−0.75%
1962	543	+1.90%
1968	566	+0.69%
1975	602	+0.88%
1982	598	−0.10%
1990	616	+0.37%
1999	731	+1.92%
2007	835	+1.68%
2012	898	+1.47%
2022	907	+0.10%

Source: EHESS and INSEE

== Culture and heritage ==
=== Civil heritage ===
The commune has a number of buildings and sites that are registered as historical monuments:

- A House at 1 Rue de l'Eglise (17th century)
- A Farmhouse at 2 Rue des Oies (1930)
- The Town Hall and School at Rue principale (1850)
- A Farmhouse at 23 Rue principale (1822)
- A Farmhouse at 24 Rue principale (18th century)
- A House at 45 Rue principale (18th century)
- A Farmhouse at 47 Rue principale (18th century)
- Houses and Farms

One structure is registered as an historical object:

- The War Memorial (20th century)

=== The Maginot Line ===
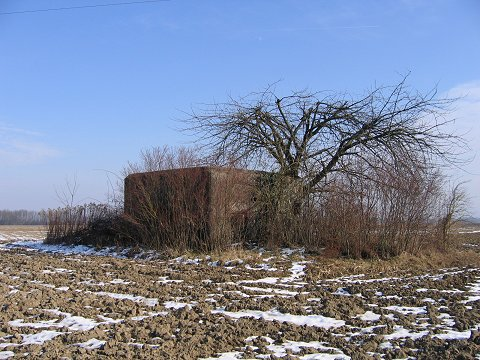
Blockhouse 2

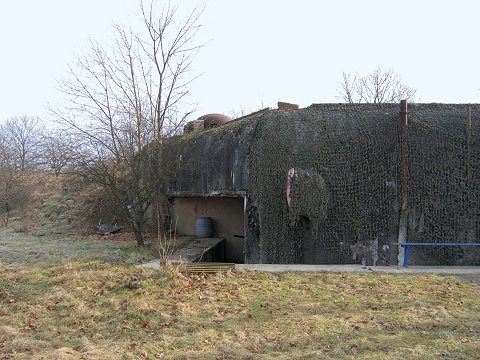
Auenheim Blockhouse North

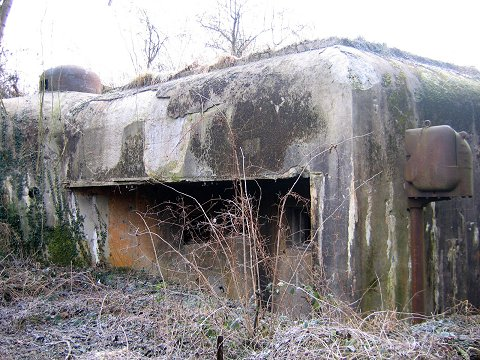
Auenheim Blockhouse South

Auenheim Blockhouse north

An isolated infantry Blockhouse, simple flank built in 1932. It housed an officer, a non-commissioned officer and 20 enlisted men.

- Floor dimensions: 25x15 metres;
- Height: 7.50 metres;
- Thickness of structural work: 2 metres;
- Exposed concrete slab: 2.25 m thick walls;
- Rear walls: 1 m thick.
- Armament: one 37 mm cannon, 3 Reibel machine guns, 5 FM, 2 50 mm mortars, grenade launcher chutes.
- History: From 1939 to 1940 the blockhouse was held by a detachment of the 68th Fortress Infantry Regiment who resisted German pressure until 1 July 1940, 6 days after the Armistice came into effect (25 June 1940).

Auenheim Blockhouse south

An isolated infantry Blockhouse, simple flank built in 1932. It housed an officer, a non-commissioned officer and 20 enlisted men.

- Floor dimensions: 25x15 metres;
- Height: 7.50 metres;
- Thickness of structural work: 2 metres;
- Exposed concrete slab: 2.25 m thick walls;
- Rear walls: 1 m thick.
- Armament: one 37 mm Cannon, 3 Reibel machine guns, 5 FM, 2 50 mm mortars, grenade launcher chutes.
- History: From 1939 to 1940 the blockhouse was held by a detachment of the 68th Fortress Infantry Regiment who resisted German pressure until 1 July 1940, 6 days after the Armistice came into effect (25 June 1940).

Blockhouse 1

- 1 25 mm antitank gun, 1 Hotchkiss machine gun

Blockhouse 2

- 1 25 mm antitank gun.

Blockhouse 3

- 1 25 mm antitank gun.

=== Religious heritage ===
The commune has one religious site that is registered as a historical monument:

- A Cemetery (19th century) The Cemetery contains two items that are registered as historical objects:
  - The Movable Objects in the Cemetery
  - The Tomb of Hélène Kuhry (1918)

== Notable people linked to the commune ==
- Henri Loux, born at Auenheim in 1873 and died at Strasbourg in 1907. An illustrator of the countryside and village scenes on a range of tableware called "Obernai".

== See also ==
- Communes of the Bas-Rhin department
