= Herrlisheim =

Herrlisheim Harelse
- Commune
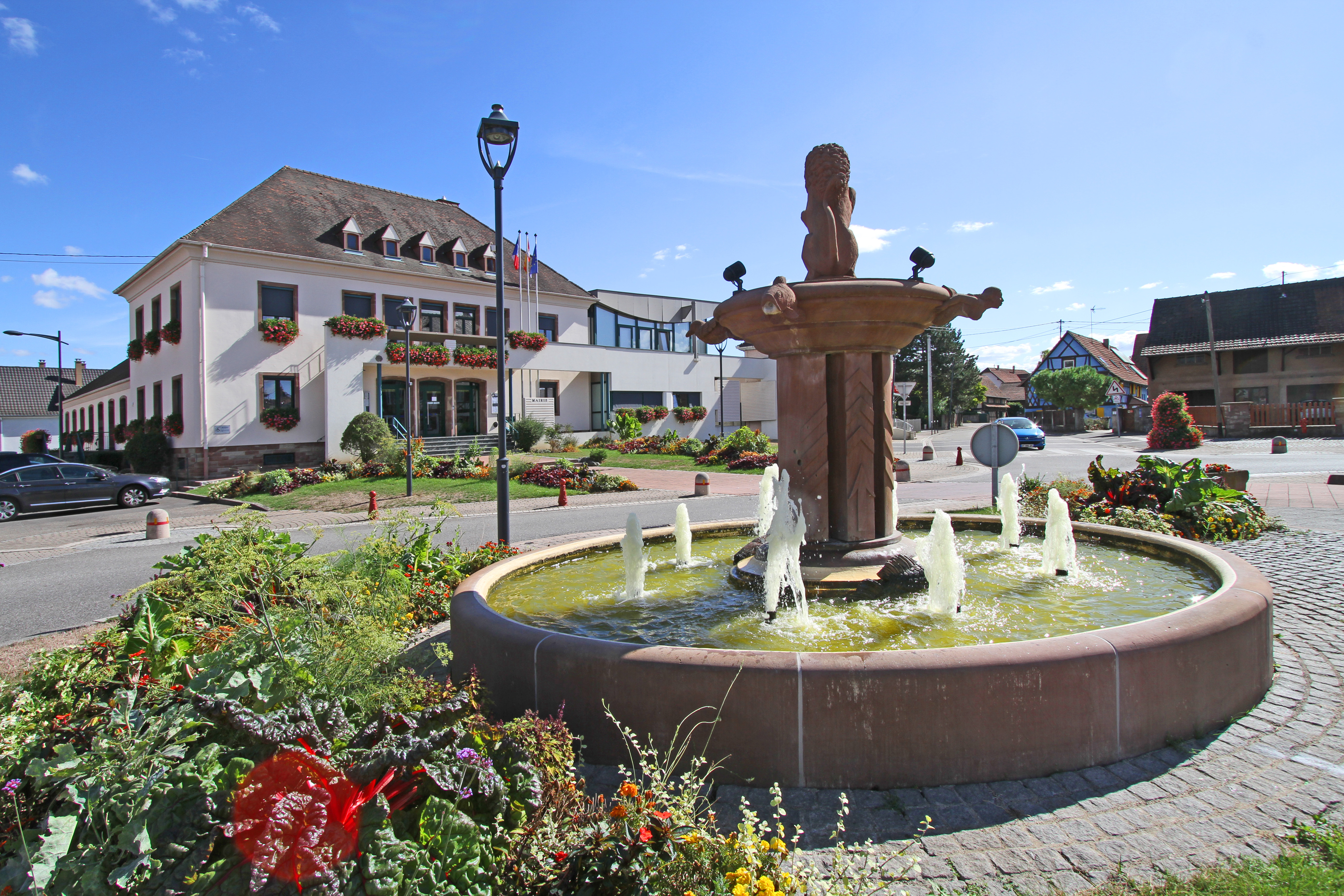
- The town hall in Herrlisheim

- Coat of arms
- Location of Herrlisheim
- Location within France Location within Grand Est
- Coordinates: 48°43′52″N 7°54′29″E
- Country: France
- Region: Grand Est
- Department: Bas-Rhin
- Arrondissement: Haguenau-Wissembourg
- Canton: Bischwiller

Government
  - Mayor (2020–2026): Serge Schaeffer
- Area^{1}: 14.38 km^{2} (5.55 sq mi)
- Highest elevation: 131 m (430 ft)
- Lowest elevation: 120 m (390 ft)
- Population (2023): 4,694
  - Density: 326.4/km^{2} (845.4/sq mi)
- Time zone: UTC+01:00 (CET)
  - Summer (DST): UTC+02:00 (CEST)
- INSEE/Postal code: 67194 /67850
- ^{1} French Land Register data, which excludes lakes, ponds, glaciers > 1 km^{2} (0.386 sq mi or 247 acres) and river estuaries.

Herrlisheim is a commune in the Bas-Rhin department in Grand Est in north-eastern France. The town dates from the 8th century. Herrlisheim was the scene of very heavy fighting during Operation Nordwind, an offensive launched by the German Army during World War II that inflicted considerable damage to the town.

== Geography ==
Herrlisheim is positioned on the rich alluvial farmland to the west of the River Rhine, north of Strasbourg. The town is part of the canton of Bischwiller and the district of Haguenau and is located on the road from Strasbourg to Lauterbourg along the A35 motorway .

Herrlisheim is bordered by the towns of Rohrwiller to the northwest, Drusenheim to the northeast, Gambsheim to the southwest and Offendorf to the southeast. The area is crossed by the Zorn, Moder and Kleinebach Rivers.

== Economy ==
The local economy is based on agriculture. The village promotes itself as the local potato capital, and a Potato Festival is organised annually.

== History ==
Herrlisheim (Herlesheim) was first mentioned in a deed dated 15 February 743, gifting a village called Hariolfesvilla (Hariolf’s Farm) to the Weissenburg Abbey, Alsace. The village may owe its name to Hariolf, an Alsatian who signed as a witness to a document dated 780. Another charter dated 1 March 775 mentioned the land of Hariolueshaim, also referring to Herlesheim, as being owned by the Abbey.

In 1251, the village known now as Herlosvesheim was owned by the Counts of Oettingen, Landgraves of lower Alsace. In 1332, control of the town was passed to the Barony of Lichtenberg, then in 1480 to the Count of Deux-Ponts (German: Zweibrücken-Bitsch). The Lichtenberg line passed to the Hanau family, who became the Counts of Hanau-Lichtenberg in 1570. From 1736 until the French Revolution, the town was controlled by the House of Hess-Darmstadt, and after 1803 due to territorial reforms following the revolution, the former county of Hanau-Lichtenberg was divided and Herrlisheim was attached to the Bailiwick of Offendorf. In 1871, it was annexed to the German imperial province of Elsass-Lothringen (German: Reichsland Elsaß-Lothringen) after its victory in the Franco-Prussian War.

=== Jewish community ===
The earliest mention of a Jewish community in Herrlisheim dates from 1349 when persecutions occurred during the Black Plague. A 1752 inventory notes thirteen Jewish families living there since 1693. Records mention "the Jew Läwel" who had to pay two florins of tax for protection in 1714. Village census records from 1821 and 1842 showed 198 Jewish residents, and in 1890, 202 Jewish residents. By 1936, the Jewish community in Herrlisheim numbered only 80 people. In 1940 under the German occupation, the remaining Jewish population in Herrlisheim were deported to the south of France. At least eleven of them were murdered. A monument with the names of the victims was erected in the Jewish cemetery of the town. After 1945, some of the former Jewish inhabitants returned; in 1953 there were 36 Jewish residents and 27 in 1956.

The community had a synagogue prior to the 18th century, which was demolished in 1805 and replaced with another building, which was then replaced with a new building in 1850. This synagogue was vandalized during World War II; only walls remained. The adjacent small prayer house was entirely destroyed. The synagogue and prayer house were rebuilt in the 1950s. The synagogue was closed in 1969.

Until 1870, Jewish residents of Herrlisheim were buried in the cemetery of Haguenau, along with Jewish residents of Hattstatt. After the Franco-Prussian War of 1870, the towns of Herrlisheim and Offendorf opened a Jewish cemetery in 1886 on the Rue d'Offendorf, directly at the end of the village of Herrlisheim. The cemetery now contains about 250 burials. Several times in the past decades since the end of World War II, the graves were vandalized. In 2004, on the anniversary of Adolf Hitler's birthday, pro-Nazi and antisemitic slogans were discovered on 127 graves of the burying ground, and cemetery signs were defaced.

=== World War II ===
Herrlisheim was the scene of intense fighting in January 1945 between the 553rd Volksgrenadier Regiment, the 35th, 119th and 2nd Panzer Grenadier Regiments, 10th SS Division and elements of the United States 12th Armored Division of the Seventh Army. The fighting began as part of Operation Nordwind which was the last offensive by German troops on the Western front in the war and was focused on the recapture of Strasbourg. The 553rd Volksgrenadier crossed the Rhine River and established a bridgehead around Gambsheim on January 5. Three days later, the 12th Armored Division started to attempt the reduction of the bridgehead and attacked Herrlisheim directly on January 16.

In the second day of fighting, elements of 10th SS Panzer Division joined in the attack and inflicted heavy casualties, virtually wiping out the 714th Tank Battalion and the 56th Armored Infantry Battalion of the 12th Armored Division, who suffered 1,250 casualties (out of a Division strength of 10,000 men) and lost 70 combat vehicles. The next day as 10th SS Panzer attempted to exploit its victory to the west of the town, it was their turn to take heavy losses as the US forces slowly withdrew. The badly battered town was finally liberated on January 31 by the United States Army as the Germans retired after the overall failure of their offensive.

50th Anniversary of World War II Memorial, Herrlisheim, France

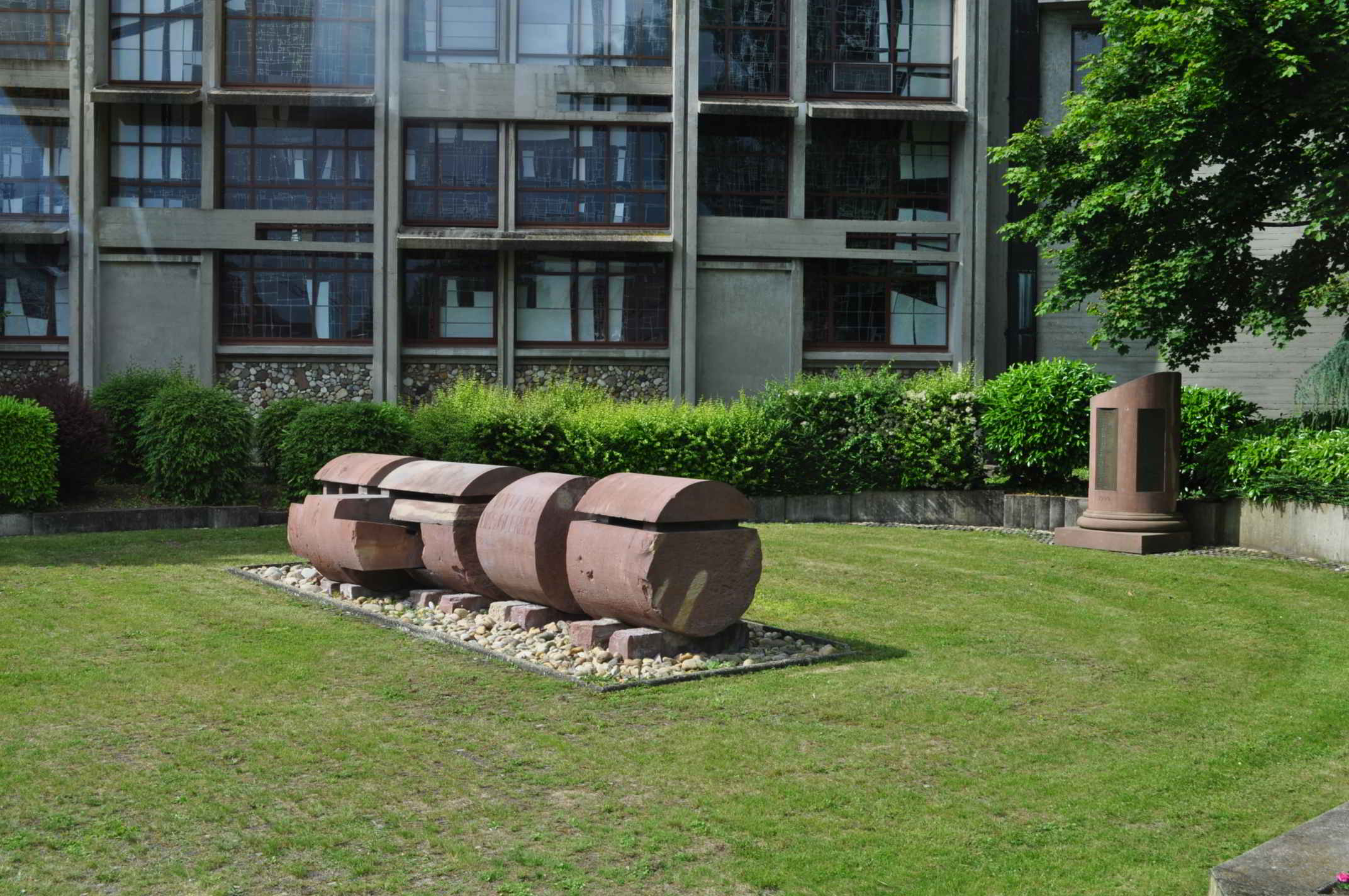
50th Anniversary of World War II Memorial, Herrlisheim, France

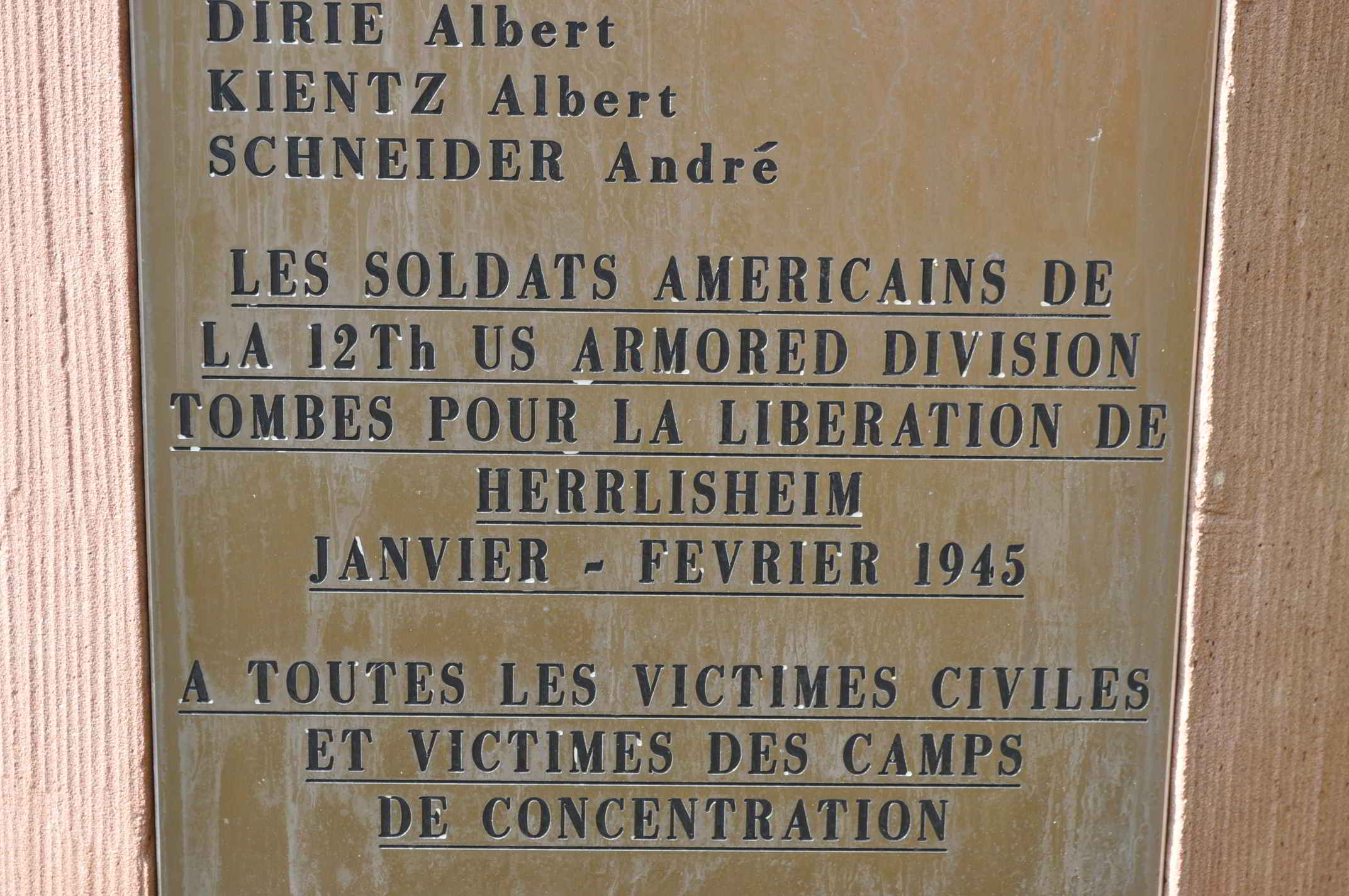
Plaque commemorating the victims of the War and defenders of Herrlisheim on the Memorial

== Recent population trend ==
Historical population
| Year | Pop. | ±% p.a. |
|---|---|---|
| 1968 | 3,108 | — |
| 1975 | 3,780 | +2.84% |
| 1982 | 3,941 | +0.60% |
| 1990 | 3,877 | −0.20% |
| 1999 | 4,198 | +0.89% |
| 2007 | 4,566 | +1.06% |
| 2012 | 4,808 | +1.04% |
| 2017 | 4,861 | +0.22% |
| 2023 | 4,694 | −0.58% |
Source: INSEE

== Heraldry ==
| Coat of Arms of Herrlisheim | «Écartelé: au premier d'azur aux trois chevrons d'or, au deuxième de gueules au fer de lance d'argent, au troisième d'argent au lion contourné de gueules, au quatrième d'azur au poisson d'argent posé en barre.» "Quarterly, on the first azure three gold chevrons, on the second gules a spearhead of silver, in the third silver a lion gules rampant, in the fourth azure a silver fish with its head raised to the right.": The gold chevron in the 1st quarter represents the County of Hanau; The spearhead represents the community of Gambsheim; The standing lion represents the county of Lichtenburg; The fish represents the Provost of Offendorf |

== See also ==
- Communes of the Bas-Rhin department
- Operation Nordwind
- 12th Armored Division (United States)
