= Henri Loux =

French painter (1873–1907)

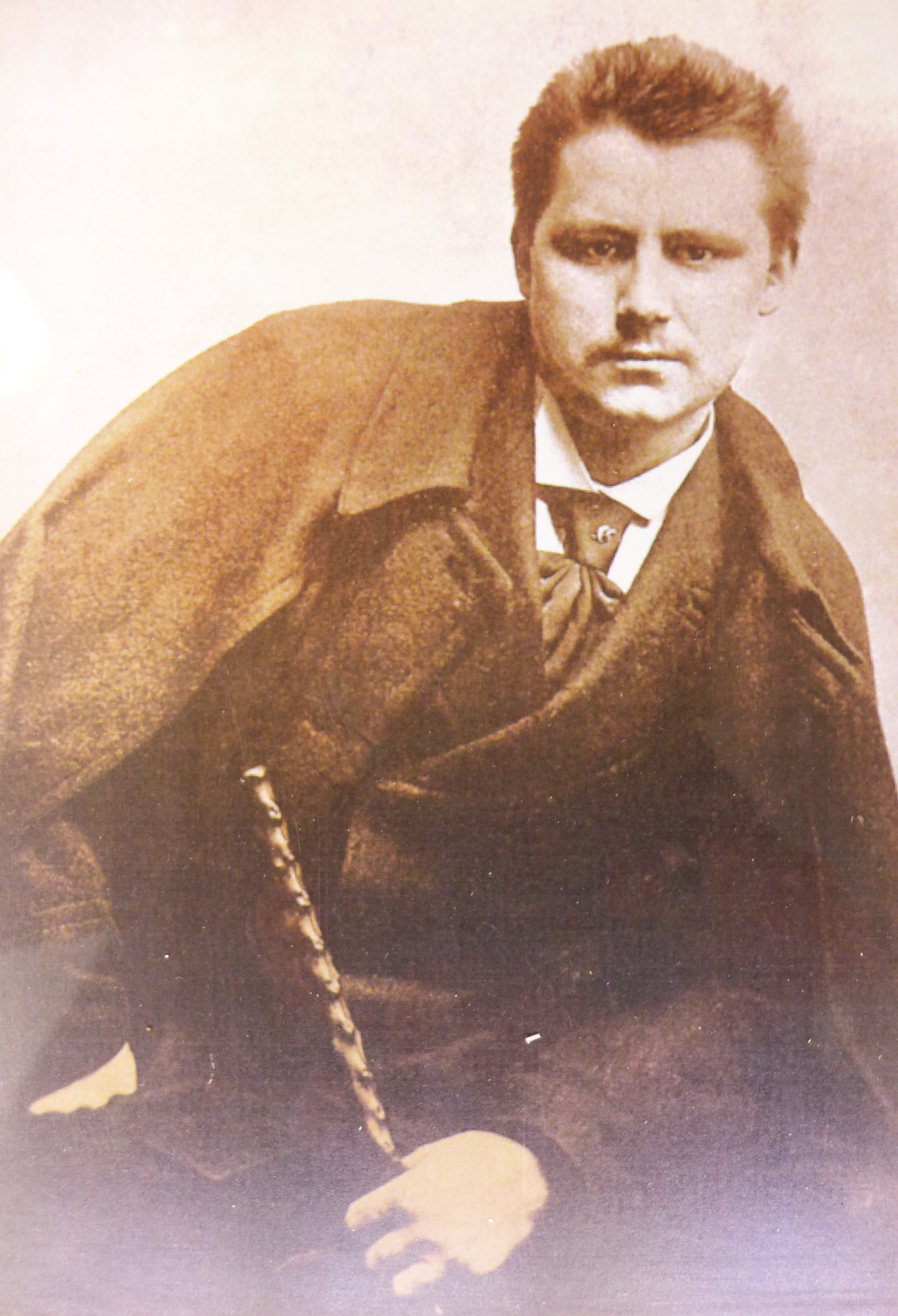
Henri Loux (date unknown)

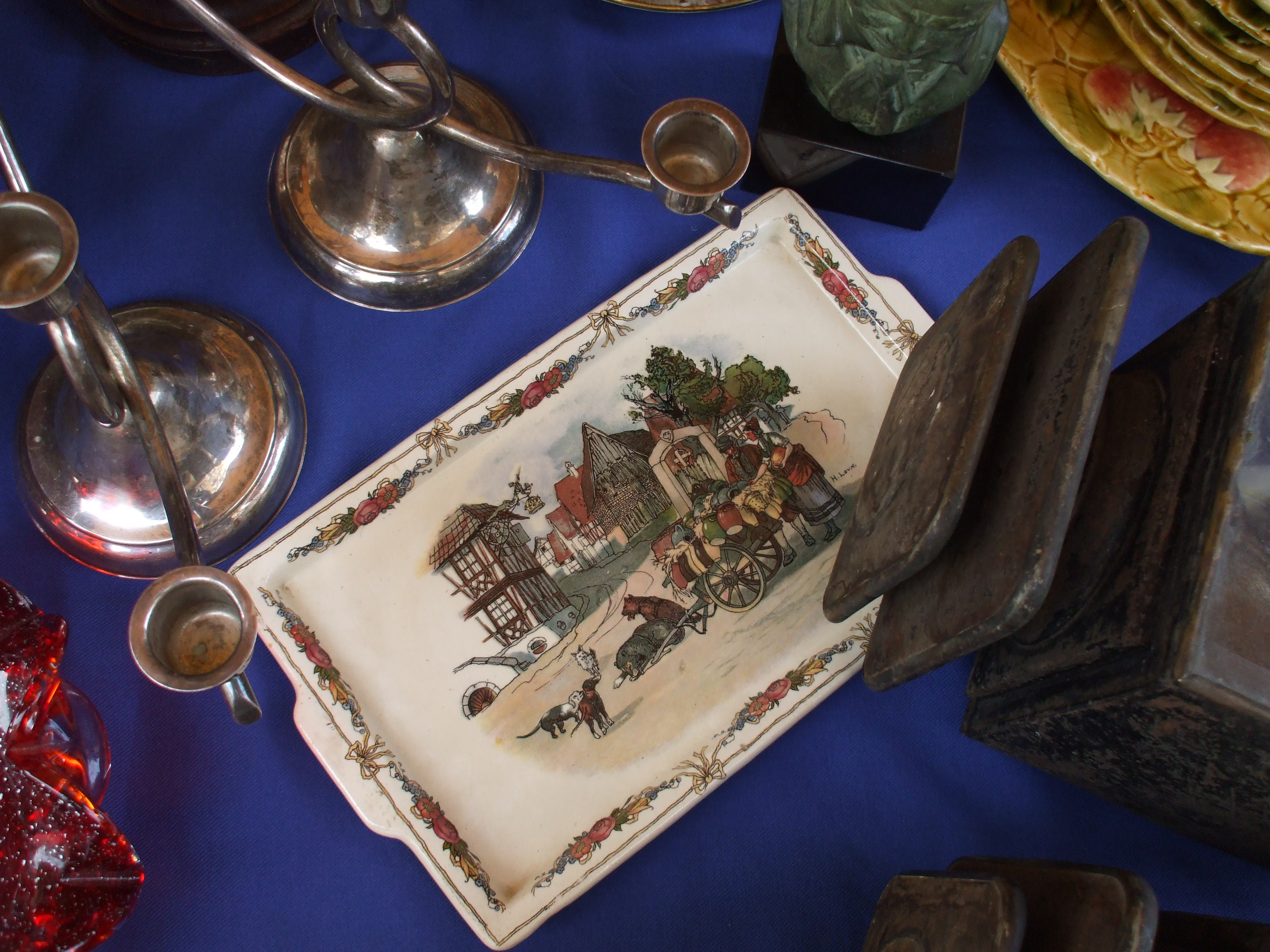
An Obernai platter

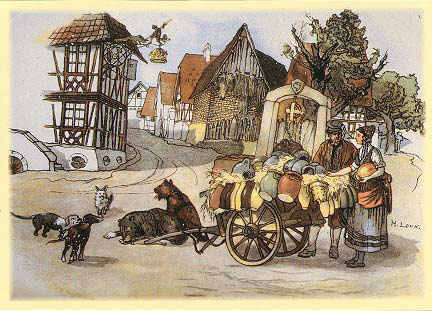
The original painting: A Pottery Salesman in Soufflenheim

Henri Édouard Loux (20 February 1873, Auenheim - 19 January 1907, Strasbourg) was an Alsatian designer, watercolorist and poster artist. He is best known for the porcelain designs he created for "Obernai" tableware.

== Biography ==
He spent what is described as a "happy, rural" childhood in Rountzenheim. He studied at a Protestant gymnasium in Strasbourg, where he was poor student, except for his artistic abilities. At the urging of his drawing teacher and his father (who was also a teacher), he attended the École supérieure des arts décoratifs de Strasbourg, where he made the acquaintance of Léo Schnug and the ceramicist, Léon Elchinger. Later, he enrolled at the Academy of Fine Arts, Munich, where he was influenced by Art Nouveau.

He returned to Strasbourg in 1897. After his father died, in 1901, he lived with his mother. During this time, he began his career doing graphic work for a new magazine called the Neuer Elsässer Bilderbogen. It failed to establish itself and folded after only a dozen issues. Shortly after, in 1902, he came into contact with Utzschneider & Cie, a faience manufactory in Sarreguemines. It was for them he would create his most familiar work: 36 designs for dishes and other tableware that would become associated with the city of Obernai, and be known by that name. The designs consist primarily of country and village scenes, typical of Alsace around the year 1900. The success of these designs would eclipse all of his other work. In 1978, Utzschneider was bought out by the Fenal family, owners of the Faïencerie de Lunéville-Saint-Clément, which still manufactures this tableware.

He died, aged only thirty-three, of heart failure, caused by tuberculosis. He is interred at the Cimetière du Polygone. In 1997, the Musée historique de Haguenau held a major retrospective.
