= Koenigsbruck Abbey =

Cistercian nunnery in Bas-Rhin, France

Coordinates: 48°51′40″N 8°00′46″E

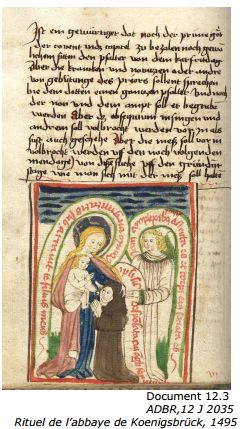
Ritual book of Koenigsbruck Abbey, 1490s

Koenigsbruck Abbey otherwise Königsbrück Abbey (French: Abbaye de Koenigsbruck; German: Kloster Königsbrück) was a Cistercian nunnery in the Forest of Haguenau, near Leutenheim, Alsace, Bas-Rhin, France, on the River Sauer.

== History ==
The abbey was founded in or around 1140 (or possibly in 1152) by Duke Frederick II of Swabia for Cistercian nuns. It was one of the wealthiest religious houses in Alsace, and among other privileges had customs immunity for a ship on the Rhine.

The abbey was plundered during the German Peasants' War in 1525, and again during the Thirty Years' War in 1621. Between 1621 and 1673 the nuns were unable to live in the abbey; as such, they moved to Haguenau. It was reconstructed in the 18th century, when Peter Thumb built the abbey church.

The abbey was dissolved during the French Revolution, in 1793, when the nuns moved to Lichtenthal Abbey near Baden-Baden.

== Structures ==
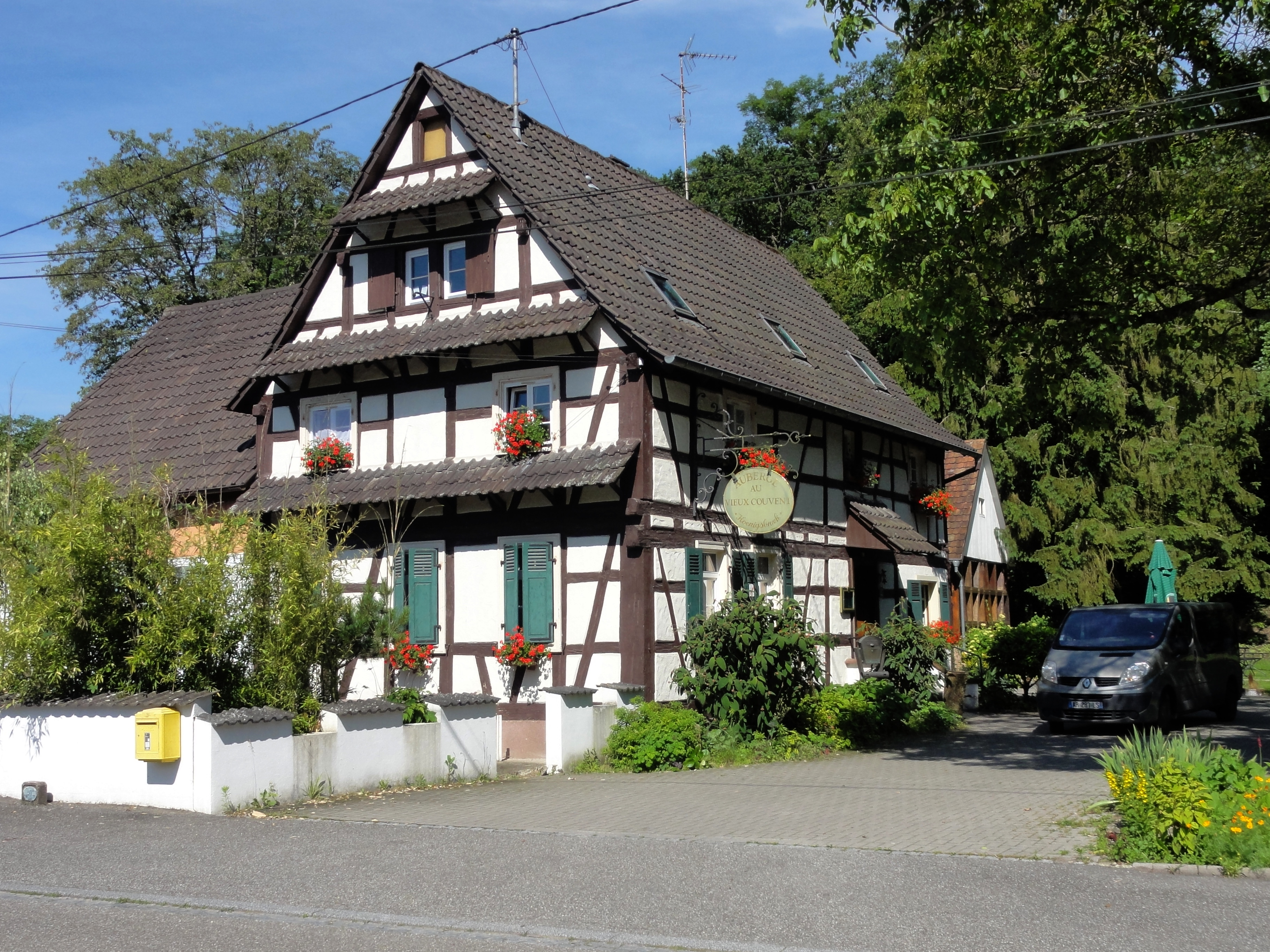
The inn Au Vieux Couvent

Apart from a mill, there are no visible remains of the buildings except for a few foundation walls near the inn Au Vieux Couvent. A number of altars formerly in the abbey church are now in the church of Roeschwoog. The abbey's later town house in Haguenau remains, the Hôtel de Koenigsbruck, Grand-Rue 142 (built in 1748), notable for its wrought iron work. It was listed as a monument historique in 1930.
