= Wippe =

Wippe may refer to:

- Wippe (Rhedaer Bach), a river of North Rhine-Westphalia, Germany, tributary of the Rhedaer Bach
- De Wippe, a windmill in Hellendoorn, in the Dutch province of Overijssel
- Wippe, a quarter of Solingen, Germany
