= Gustav Anrich =

German church historian (1867–1930)

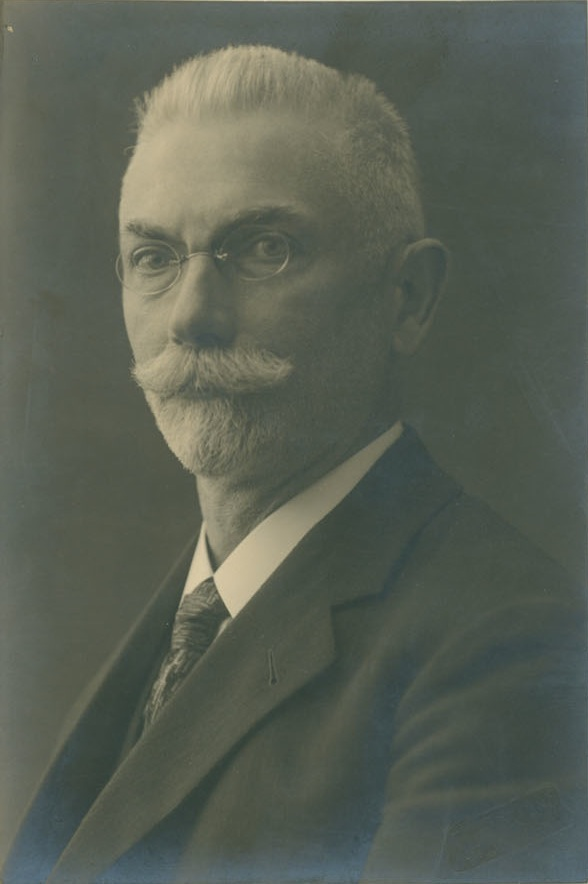
Gustav Anrich (1920)

Gustav Anrich (2 December 1867 in Rountzenheim, Alsace – 13 November 1930 in Tübingen) was a German church historian from Alsace, who served as rector of both the University of Strasbourg and the University of Tübingen (1928–1929). He was a leading expert on the history of early Christianity and its relation to and influence by ancient mystery religions and the emergence of the cult of saints. He was also noted for his work on the history of the Reformation in Alsace. In his last years, he concerned himself with the history of the University of Strasbourg and Alsace more broadly, but he died before he could complete his work on the university's history.

He was the son of Edouard Anrich (1835–1868), parish priest in Rountzenheim in Alsace. His mother Emma née Gerold was the sister of the priest and pro-French Strasbourg politician Charles-Théodore Gerold. After his studies of theology at the University of Strasbourg and the University of Marburg, he received his doctorate at Strasbourg in 1894 with the dissertation Das antike Mysterienwesen in seinem Einfluss auf das Christentum ("The Ancient Mystery Religions and their Influence on Christianity"). He was parish priest in Lingolsheim in Alsace 1894–1901 and became Associate Professor at the University of Strasbourg in 1903. From 1914 to 1918, he was Professor of Church History at the University of Strasbourg, and was rector of the university until 1918. He was Professor of Church History at the University of Bonn 1919–1925 and at the University of Tübingen 1924–1930, where he was elected rector for the term 1928–1929.

He was the father of the historian Ernst Anrich.
