= Ellerbrockgraben =

River in Germany

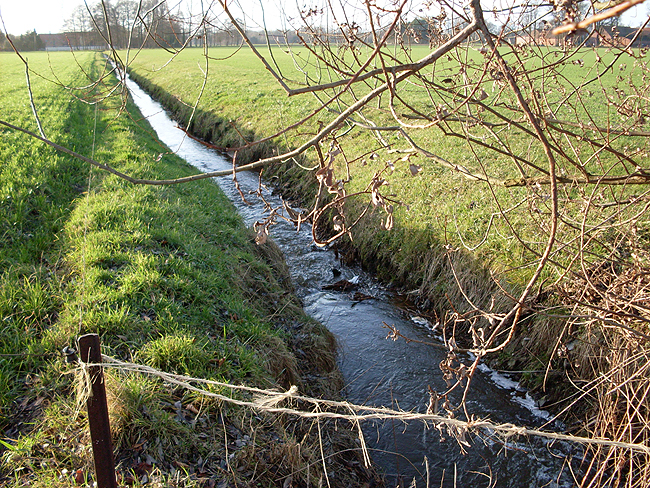

Location
- Country: Germany
- State: North Rhine-Westphalia

Physical characteristics
- Mouth
  - location: Rhedaer Bach
  - coordinates: 52.0091°N 8.2901°E

Basin features
- Progression: Rhedaer Bach→ Ems→ North Sea

Ellerbrockgraben is a small river of North Rhine-Westphalia, Germany. It flows into the Rhedaer Bach southwest of Halle (Westfalen).

== See also ==
- List of rivers of North Rhine-Westphalia
