= Ernst Anrich =

German academic and publisher (1906–2001)

Ernst Anrich (born 9 August 1906 in Strasbourg, died 21 October 2001 in Seeheim-Jugenheim) was a German modern historian, sociologist, university professor, academic administrator and publisher, who was the principal founder (in 1949) and managing director (from 1953 to 1966) of the Wissenschaftliche Buchgesellschaft (WBG) publishing company in Darmstadt, one of Germany's leading academic publishing companies and also one of the largest book clubs in Germany.

== Career ==
He grew up in Strasbourg, the son of the prominent church historian and rector of both the University of Strasbourg and the University of Tübingen Gustav Anrich, and belonged to a family of theologians and judges from Alsace, with Swiss roots. His grandfather Edouard Anrich (1835–1868) was parish priest in Rountzenheim and his grandmother Emma Gerold was the sister of the priest and pro-French Strasbourg politician Charles-Théodore Gerold. When Alsace was taken by France during the First World War, his family moved to Tübingen.

He obtained his doctorate in history at the University of Bonn in 1930 with a dissertation on the 1914 July Crisis and then earned his Habilitation at the same university in 1932, also with a work on the July Crisis. From 1938, he was Associate Professor of Modern History at the University of Bonn, from 1940 Professor of Modern History at the University of Hamburg and from 1941 to 1943 Dean of the Faculty of Philosophy at the Reichsuniversität Straßburg. He was the major force behind the establishment of the Wissenschaftliche Buchgesellschaft in 1949, and became the company's managing director in 1953. Under his leadership, the company became a leading academic publishing company in then-West Germany. In the postwar era, he was appointed as a Professor zur Wiederverwendung in the German civil service, giving him the title, rights and economic benefits of a Professor, but without actually holding a university position.

His scholarly focus was on western European modern history, and the history of modern imperialism in particular. In his opus magnum Die englische Politik im Juli 1914 ("The English Policy on the July 1914 Crisis"), he traces the origin of the First World War to the great powers' power interests, and finds the main flaw of German prewar policies to be the German rejection of a British alliance offer. He also highlights British Foreign Secretary Edward Grey's efforts to keep the peace in Europe. During the 1930s and 1940s, he was influential in German western research, i.e. area studies of the countries on Germany's western borders including his native Alsace and the westernmost parts of Germany.

As a student, he was active in the Nazi movement, and was appointed Reichsschulungsleiter (National Education Leader) in the Nazi Party's students' association. However, in 1931, at the age of 25, he was expelled from the Nazi party on the personal order of Adolf Hitler due to a conflict with Baldur von Schirach, who successfully prevented him from being readmitted as a member. In the 1950s and early 1960s, he was a highly influential publisher with a moderate conservative profile. He was a member of the city council of Darmstadt for the Christian Democratic Union from 1960 to 1964. In his book Muss Feindschaft bestehen zwischen Frankreich und Deutschland? (1951), he advocated French–German reconciliation and cooperation. From 1966, he took a turn to the right after he was forced to retire as CEO of the Wissenschaftliche Buchgesellschaft in the aftermath of delivering a controversial speech at the national convention of the right-wing National Democratic Party of Germany. He became a member of the presidium of that party in 1967 and was referred to as their "chief ideologist," at a time the party enjoyed electoral successes and was represented in most state parliaments. However, his views were strongly controversial also within the party, particularly his justification of dictatorship under certain circumstances, which were perceived as giving legitimacy also to the Soviet Union and as weakening the party's anti-communist stance. He became one of the party's vice presidents in 1971, but left the party entirely in 1976.

In addition to his scholarly work in modern history, he was interested in parapsychology, depth psychology and natural sciences, and secured Hans Bender a lectureship at the University of Strasbourg when he was dean. His book Moderne Physik und Tiefenpsychlogie (1963) was an in-depth philosophical discussion of the boundaries of physics, psychology and philosophy. He was a member of the Evangelische Notgemeinschaft in Deutschland, a staunchly conservative Christian association. In Darmstadt, he lived in Landskronstraße 31 until 1965.
