= Wippe (Rhedaer Bach) =

River in Germany

Location
- Country: Germany
- State: North Rhine-Westphalia

Physical characteristics
- Mouth
  - location: Rhedaer Bach
  - coordinates: 51°57′42″N 8°11′46″E

Basin features
- Progression: Rhedaer Bach→ Ems→ North Sea

Wippe is a small river of North Rhine-Westphalia, Germany. It is 5.6 km (3.5 mi) long and is a left tributary of the Rhedaer Bach near Harsewinkel.

== See also ==
- List of rivers of North Rhine-Westphalia
