= Kauffenheim =

Kauffenheim Kafem
- Commune
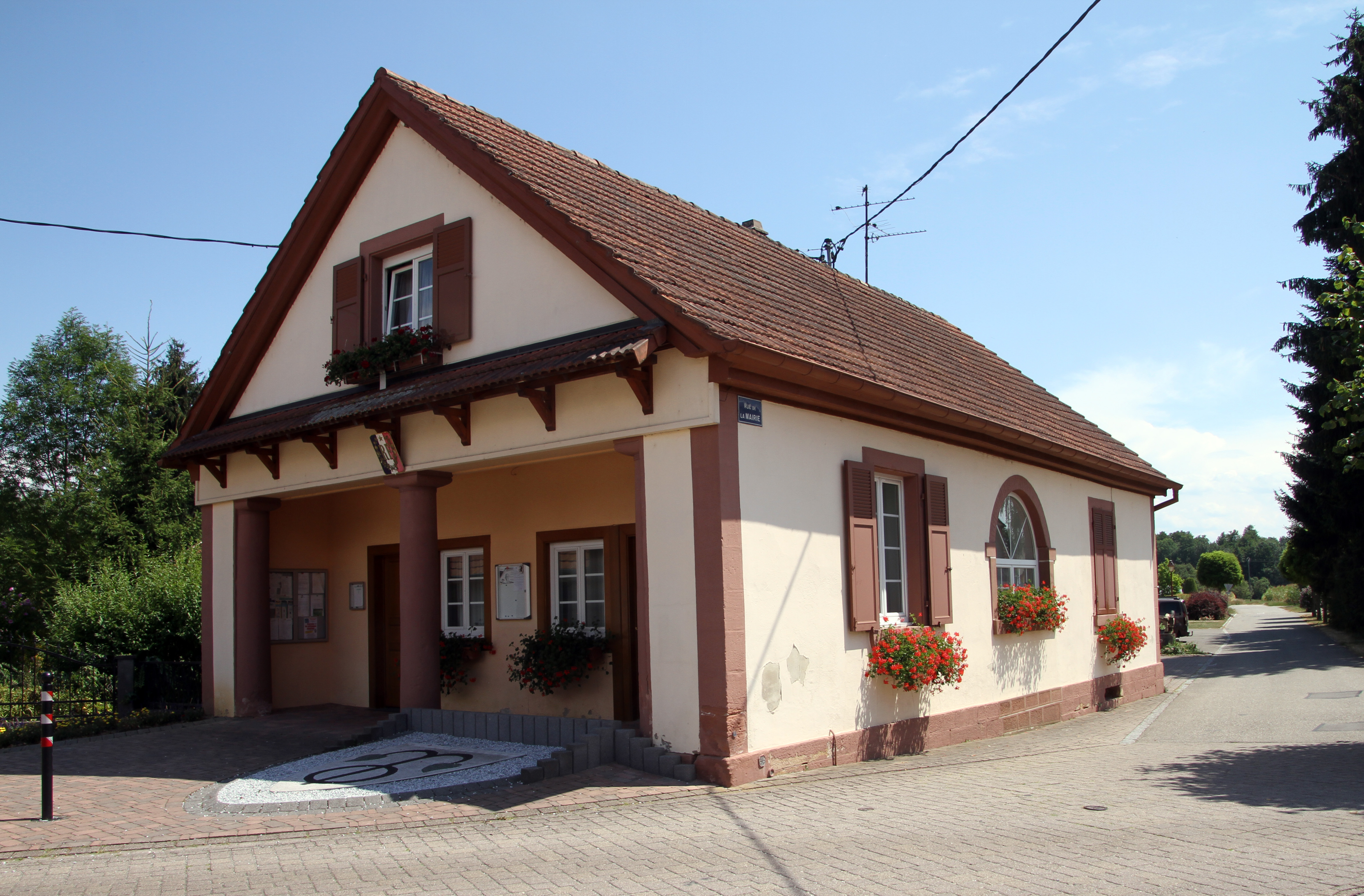
- The town hall in Kauffenheim

- Coat of arms
- Location of Kauffenheim
- Location within France Location within Grand Est
- Coordinates: 48°51′12″N 8°01′44″E
- Country: France
- Region: Grand Est
- Department: Bas-Rhin
- Arrondissement: Haguenau-Wissembourg
- Canton: Bischwiller
- Intercommunality: Pays Rhénan

Government
  - Mayor (2020–2026): Rémy Bubel
- Area^{1}: 2.24 km^{2} (0.86 sq mi)
- Highest elevation: 120 m (390 ft)
- Lowest elevation: 113 m (371 ft)
- Population (2023): 222
  - Density: 99.1/km^{2} (257/sq mi)
- Time zone: UTC+01:00 (CET)
  - Summer (DST): UTC+02:00 (CEST)
- INSEE/Postal code: 67231 /67480
- ^{1} French Land Register data, which excludes lakes, ponds, glaciers > 1 km^{2} (0.386 sq mi or 247 acres) and river estuaries.

Kauffenheim (French pronunciation: [kaufənaim]; Alsatian: Kafem) is a commune in the Bas-Rhin department in Grand Est in north-eastern France. It lies twenty kilometres (twelve miles) to the east of Haguenau, and a short distance from the A35 autoroute Strasbourg–Landau.

== History ==
The first surviving record of the village dates from 884 and spells the name of the village "Chochinheim". Subsequently, the name has been written Cochenheim, Chochenheim, Kochenheim and Koechenheim before morphing into Kauffenheim, the current spelling.

Between 1359 and 1680 the village was owned by the aristocratic von Fleckenstein family.

In 1720 it came into the possession of the Rohan-Soubise family, and thus remained until the French Revolution.

== Population ==
Historical population
Year	Pop.	±% p.a.
1968	120	—
1975	136	+1.80%
1982	176	+3.75%
1990	202	+1.74%
1999	209	+0.38%
2007	209	+0.00%
2012	215	+0.57%
2017	215	+0.00%
2023	222	+0.54%
Source: INSEE

== See also ==
- Communes of the Bas-Rhin department
