= Rountzenheim-Auenheim =

- Commune
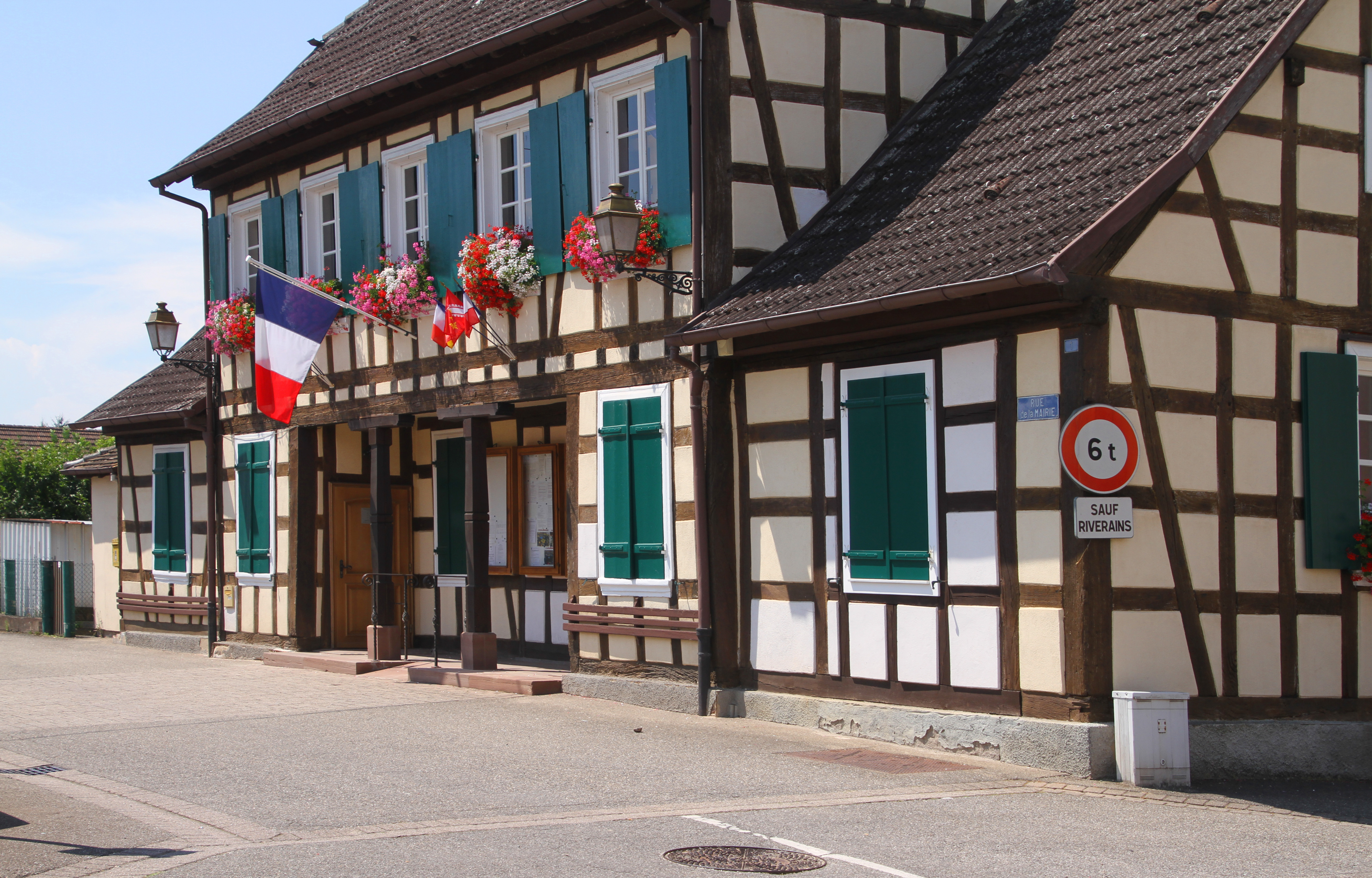
- Mairie in Rountzenheim

- Coat of arms
- Location of Rountzenheim-Auenheim
- Location within France Location within Grand Est
- Coordinates: 48°49′11″N 8°00′25″E
- Country: France
- Region: Grand Est
- Department: Bas-Rhin
- Arrondissement: Haguenau-Wissembourg
- Canton: Bischwiller
- Intercommunality: Pays Rhénan

Government
  - Mayor (2020–2026): Bénédicte Klöpper
- Area^{1}: 10.91 km^{2} (4.21 sq mi)
- Highest elevation: 121 m (397 ft)
- Lowest elevation: 116 m (381 ft)
- Population (2023): 2,025
  - Density: 185.6/km^{2} (480.7/sq mi)
- Time zone: UTC+01:00 (CET)
  - Summer (DST): UTC+02:00 (CEST)
- INSEE/Postal code: 67418 /67480
- ^{1} French Land Register data, which excludes lakes, ponds, glaciers > 1 km^{2} (0.386 sq mi or 247 acres) and river estuaries.

Rountzenheim-Auenheim (French pronunciation: [ʁuntsənaim auənaim]) is a commune in the Bas-Rhin department in Grand Est in north-eastern France. It was established on 1 January 2019 by merger of the former communes of Rountzenheim (the seat) and Auenheim.

== Population ==
Historical population
Year	Pop.	±% p.a.
1968	1,310	—
1975	1,409	+1.05%
1982	1,395	−0.14%
1990	1,461	+0.58%
1999	1,707	+1.74%
2007	1,842	+0.96%
2012	1,965	+1.30%
2017	1,937	−0.29%
2023	2,025	+0.74%
Source: INSEE

== See also ==
- Communes of the Bas-Rhin department
