= Roppenheim =

Roppenheim Roppenem
- Commune
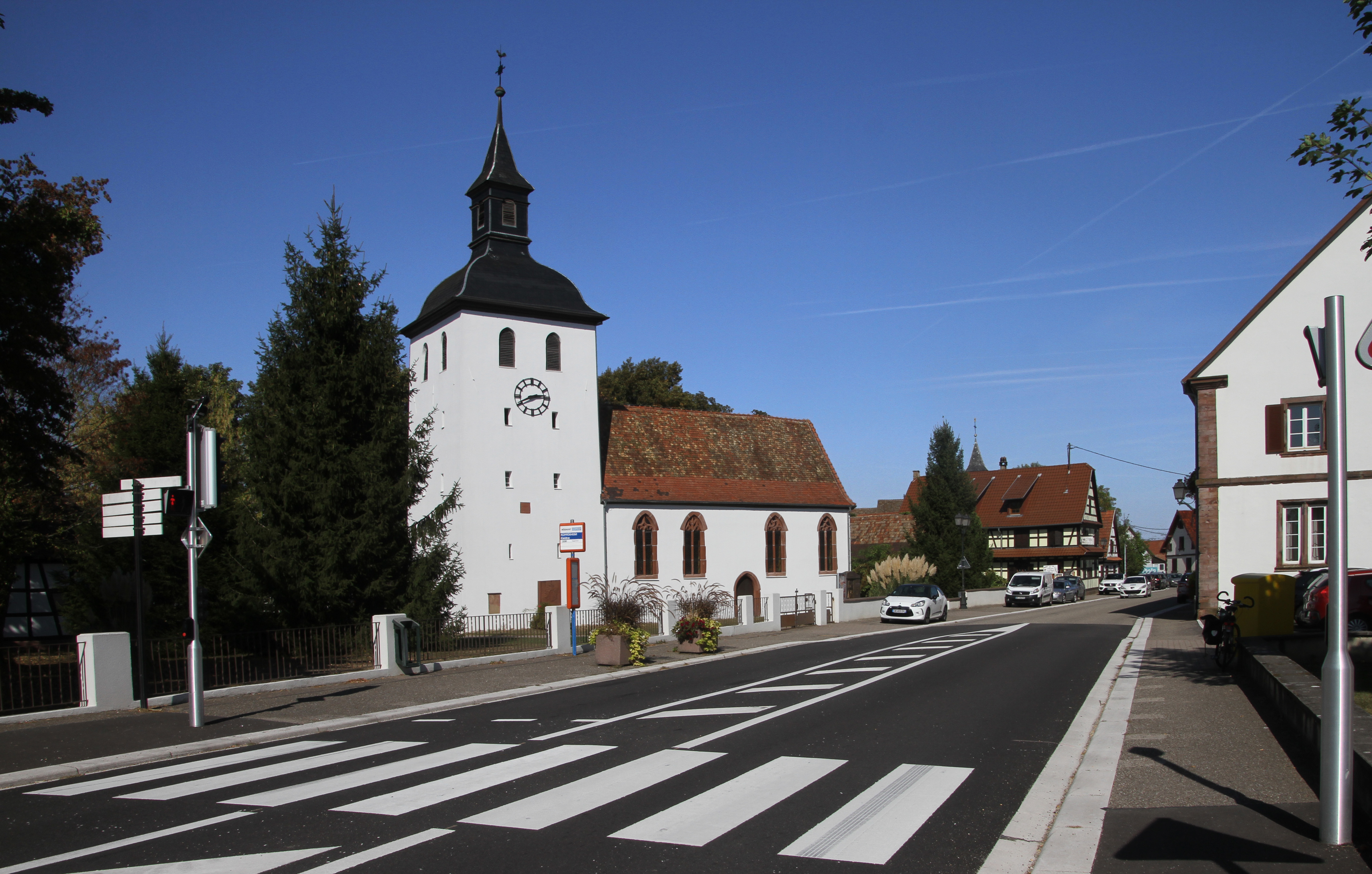
- Protestant church

- Coat of arms
- Location of Roppenheim
- Location within France Location within Grand Est
- Coordinates: 48°50′41″N 8°03′18″E
- Country: France
- Region: Grand Est
- Department: Bas-Rhin
- Arrondissement: Haguenau-Wissembourg
- Canton: Bischwiller

Government
  - Mayor (2020–2026): René Stumpf
- Area^{1}: 6.88 km^{2} (2.66 sq mi)
- Highest elevation: 119 m (390 ft)
- Lowest elevation: 113 m (371 ft)
- Population (2023): 1,031
  - Density: 150/km^{2} (388/sq mi)
- Time zone: UTC+01:00 (CET)
  - Summer (DST): UTC+02:00 (CEST)
- INSEE/Postal code: 67409 /67480
- ^{1} French Land Register data, which excludes lakes, ponds, glaciers > 1 km^{2} (0.386 sq mi or 247 acres) and river estuaries.

Roppenheim (German pronunciation: [ˈʁɔpm̩ˌhaɪ̯m], French: [ʁɔpən(h)ajm]; Alemannic German: Roppenem) is a commune in the Bas-Rhin department, in the cultural region of Alsace, administrative region of Grand Est, northeastern France.

== See also ==
- Communes of the Bas-Rhin department
