= Dalhunden =

Dalhunden Dalhunde
- Commune
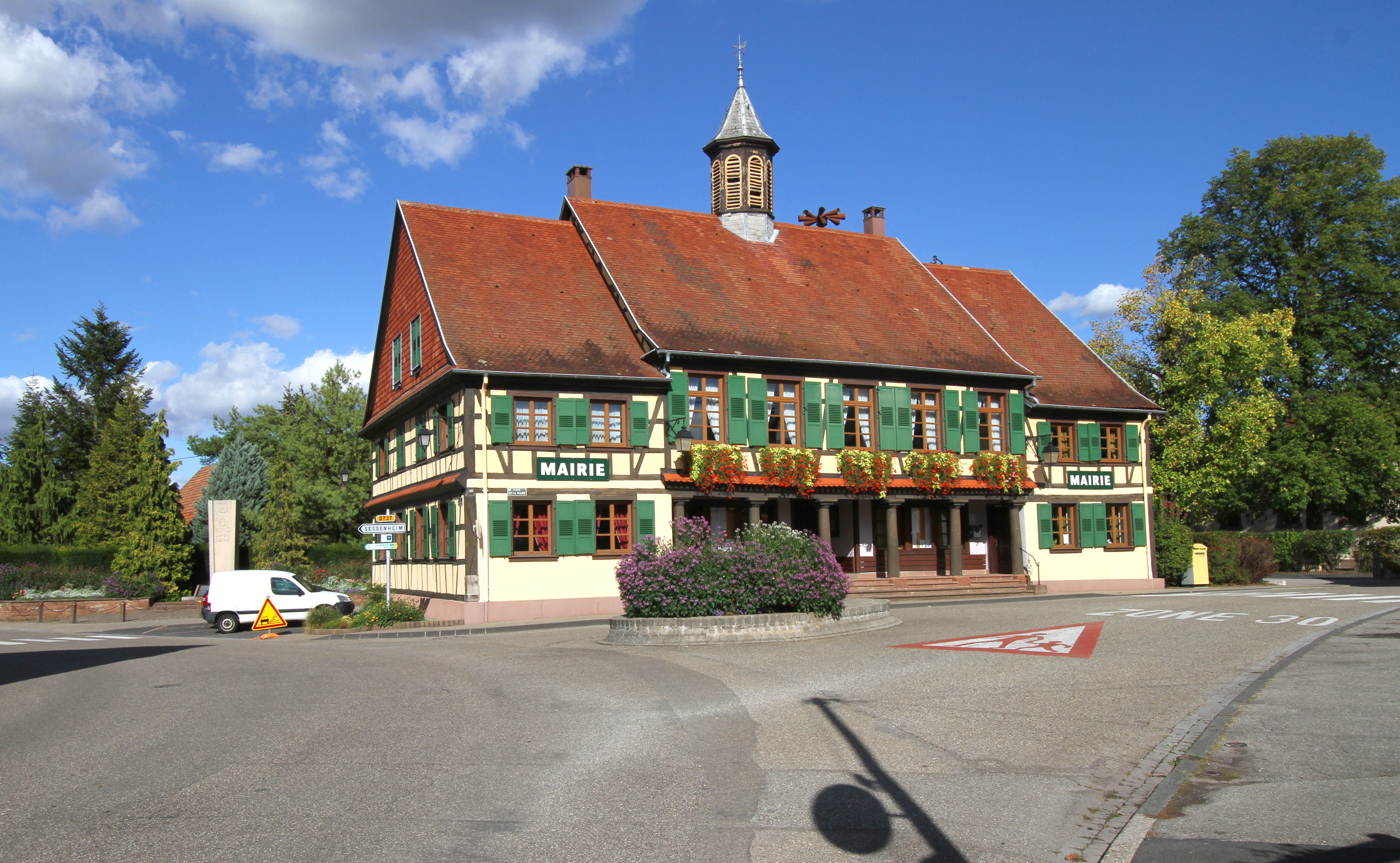
- Town hall

- Coat of arms
- Location of Dalhunden
- Location within France Location within Grand Est
- Coordinates: 48°46′30″N 7°59′32″E
- Country: France
- Region: Grand Est
- Department: Bas-Rhin
- Arrondissement: Haguenau-Wissembourg
- Canton: Bischwiller
- Intercommunality: Pays Rhénan

Government
  - Mayor (2020–2026): Michel Degoursy
- Area^{1}: 7.45 km^{2} (2.88 sq mi)
- Highest elevation: 125 m (410 ft)
- Lowest elevation: 118 m (387 ft)
- Population (2023): 1,215
  - Density: 163/km^{2} (422/sq mi)
- Time zone: UTC+01:00 (CET)
  - Summer (DST): UTC+02:00 (CEST)
- INSEE/Postal code: 67082 /67770
- ^{1} French Land Register data, which excludes lakes, ponds, glaciers > 1 km^{2} (0.386 sq mi or 247 acres) and river estuaries.

Dalhunden (French pronunciation: [dalundən]) is a commune in the Bas-Rhin department and Grand Est region of north-eastern France.

== See also ==
- Communes of the Bas-Rhin department
