= Leutenheim =

Leutenheim Littenem
- Commune
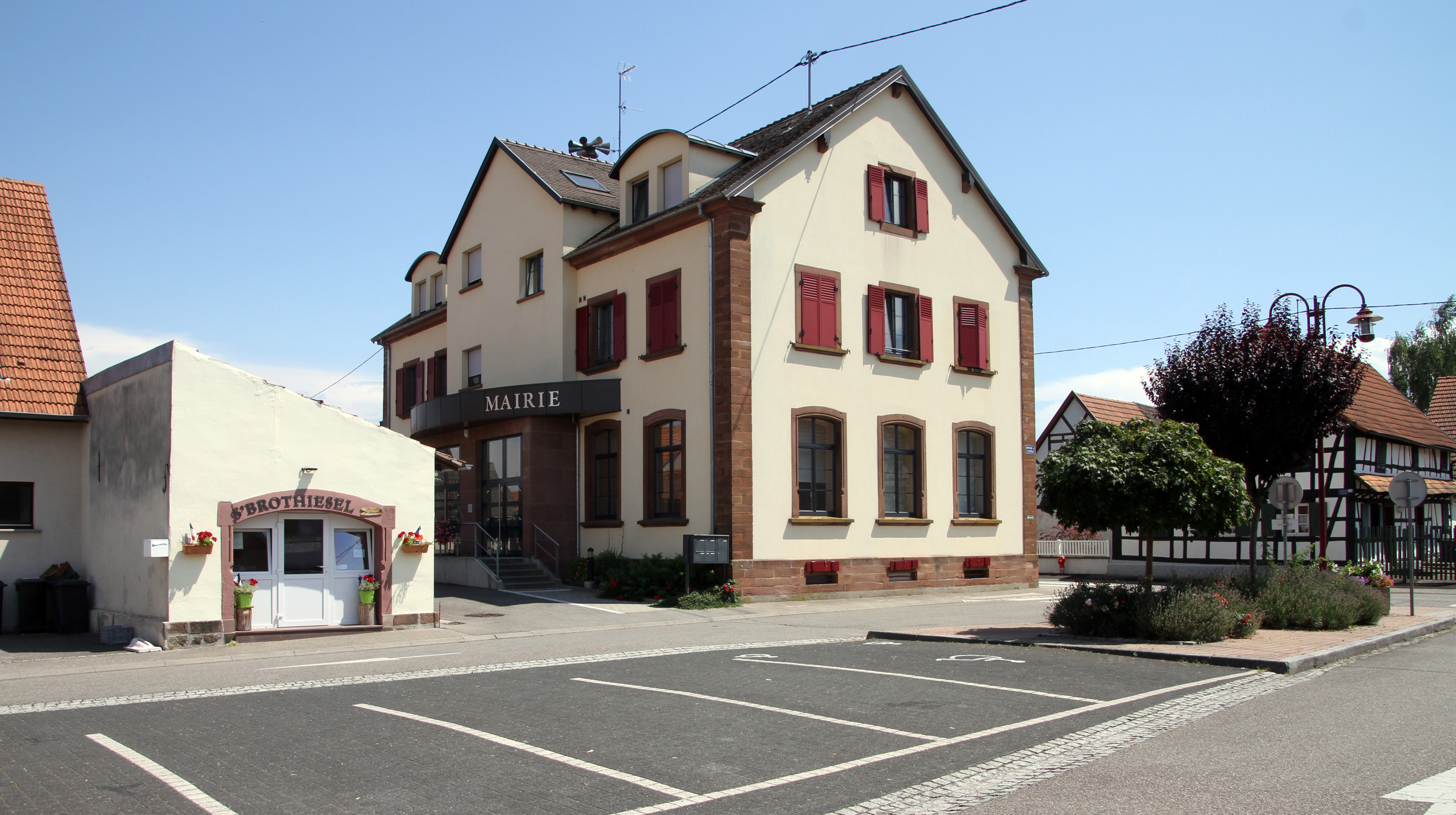
- The town hall in Leutenheim

- Coat of arms
- Location of Leutenheim
- Location within France Location within Grand Est
- Coordinates: 48°50′37″N 8°01′17″E
- Country: France
- Region: Grand Est
- Department: Bas-Rhin
- Arrondissement: Haguenau-Wissembourg
- Canton: Bischwiller

Government
  - Mayor (2020–2026): Marc Antoni
- Area^{1}: 10.39 km^{2} (4.01 sq mi)
- Highest elevation: 139 m (456 ft)
- Lowest elevation: 115 m (377 ft)
- Population (2023): 834
  - Density: 80.3/km^{2} (208/sq mi)
- Time zone: UTC+01:00 (CET)
  - Summer (DST): UTC+02:00 (CEST)
- INSEE/Postal code: 67264 /67480
- ^{1} French Land Register data, which excludes lakes, ponds, glaciers > 1 km^{2} (0.386 sq mi or 247 acres) and river estuaries.

Leutenheim is a commune in the Bas-Rhin department in Grand Est in north-eastern France. It lies 20 kilometres (12 mi) east of Haguenau and a short distance west of the Rhine, which here defines the frontier between France and Germany.

== History ==
In eighth- and ninth-century records the village appears as Lithaim.

In around 1140 Königsbrück Abbey was founded here, a Cistercian nunnery, dissolved during the French Revolution.

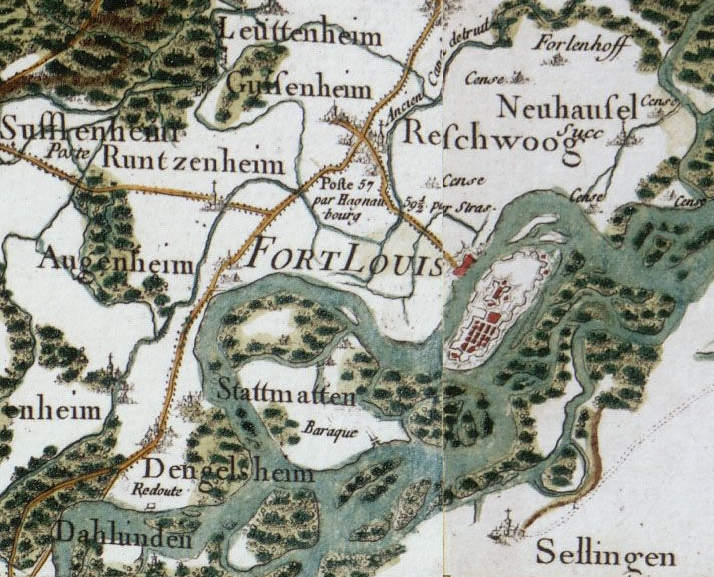
'Leuttenheim' (top), between the Forest of Haguenau and the River Rhine, from the 18th century Cassini map.

Before the Rhine was channeled, the landscape here was marshy and criss-crossed by branches of the river. Accordingly, the settlement is constructed on warfts.

== See also ==
- Communes of the Bas-Rhin department
