= Kleinebach =

River in Germany

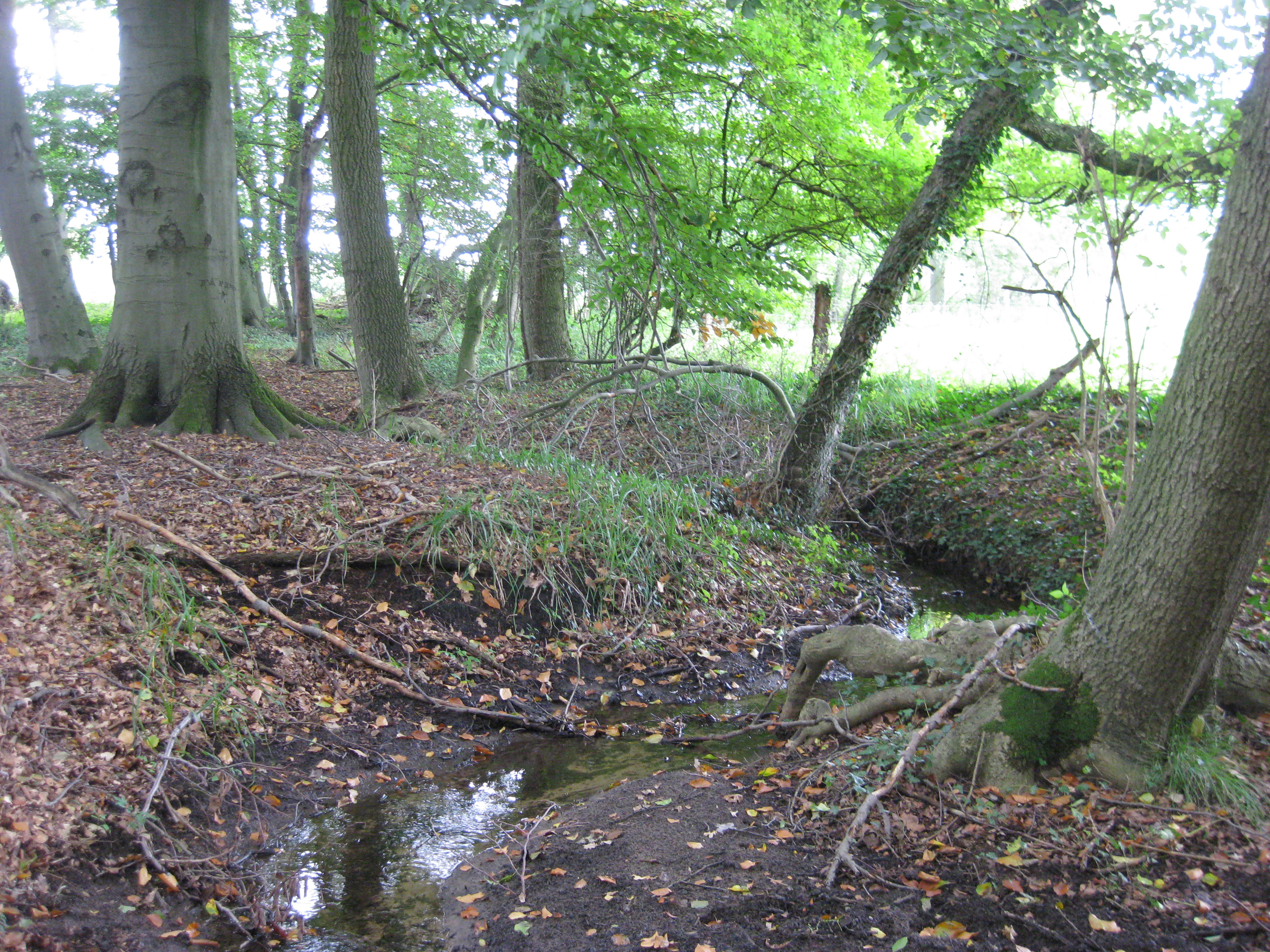

Location
- Country: Germany
- States: North Rhine-Westphalia

Physical characteristics
- Mouth
  - location: Rhedaer Bach
  - coordinates: 52.0190°N 8.3037°E

Basin features
- Progression: Rhedaer Bach→ Ems→ North Sea

Kleinebach (also: Kleine Bach) is a small river of North Rhine-Westphalia, Germany. It is 3.8 km long and flows into the Rhedaer Bach as a left tributary near Halle (Westfalen).

== See also ==
- List of rivers of North Rhine-Westphalia
