= Jean-Chrisostome Hess =

French composer from Alsace

Jean-Chrisostome Hess (26 January 1816 – 8 March 1900) was one of the most prolific French composers of salon music for the piano as well as transcriptions of popular songs and arias from operas. He was also active as an organist, pianist, and teacher.

Since he always abbreviated his name as "J. Ch. Hess", his first names have often been misinterpreted as "Jean-Charles". His birth certificate, however, is clear about his real names.

== Life ==
Hess was born in Soufflenheim, Bas-Rhin, in the Alsace region of France. Nothing is known about his musical education, but as no traces of studies at any of the major conservatories have to come to light yet, it must be presumed that he had private teachers on piano and organ in his home town or perhaps in Strasbourg.

Like many composers of his time, he appears to have earned his living as a church organist. His first assignment began in 1838 in Lorient (Morbihan) where he worked at least until the mid-1840s (his son Charles Léon was born there in 1844). For 1853–54, he is mentioned as organist in Laval (Mayenne). He then moved to Paris where, from April 1855, he worked for many years as organist at Saint-Nicolas-des-Champs, Paris, succeeding fellow Alsatian François-Xavier Joseph Wackenthaler. There is no date of a retirement, but he composed music for the organ until 1889, which may roughly coincide with it.

He was the father of Charles Léon Hess (1844–1926), also a composer, among other works, of the opera Le Dîner de Pierrot, produced in 1893 at the Opéra-Comique, Paris.

== Music ==
Although J.-Ch. Hess wrote a number of works for organ and harmonium, which would reflect his profession as church organist, the main body of his music consists of light salon music for the piano. This in itself can be divided into original compositions and arrangements of popular melodies and arias from contemporary operas, the latter often in the form of a fantasia or of a theme and variations approach. Hess was a particularly prolific composer: the catalogue of his published compositions in the Bibliothèque nationale de France numbers more than 370.

Some of these pieces were eminently successful. In an obituary notice, the French journal Le Ménestrel – like most of Hess' music published by Heugel – wrote "They were truly popular and their print runs reached hundreds of thousands of copies" ("[Ils] furent véritablement populaires et leurs tirages montèrent à des centaines de mille d’exemplaires"). Among his most popular pieces were Où vas-tu, petit oiseau?, Op. 17 (1853, on a popular song by Léopold Amat), his fantasia Le Carnaval de Venise, Op. 43 (1857, on André Campra's opera of the same title), and Le Cor des Alpes, Op. 59 (1860, on a piece of the same title by Heinrich Proch).

== Selected compositions ==
=== Piano music ===
- Où vas-tu, petit oiseau?, Op. 17 (1853)
- Tige brisée, Op. 20 (1853)
- La Fête des oiseaux à Quimperlé. Quadrille brillant composé pour les petites mains sur des airs bretons (1854)
- Si loin, Op. 24 (1854)
- Cécilia. Rêverie mazurka, Op. 34 (1855)
- Divertissement sur Les Deux notaires, de G. Nadaud, Op. 37 (1855)
- 3 Airs de ballet des Lavandières de Santareur, opéra de Gevaert, Op. 40 (1856)
- Près d'un berceau. Berceuse, Op. 42 (1856)
- Le Carnaval de Venise, Op. 43 (1857)
- Le Pardon. Rêverie sur la mélodie de A. de Beauplan, Op. 46 (1857)
- Marinette. Mazurka de salon sur l'opérette bouffe de Gust. Héquet, Op. 48 (1858)
- Pauvre Jacques. Romance de la marquise de Travenet, transcrite et variée, Op. 55 (1859)
- La Campanella. Polka-mazurke de salon, Op. 56 (1859)
- Le Cor des Alpes, Op. 59 (1860)
- Rêverie sur Semiramide, de Rossini, Op. 62 (1860)
- La Dernière rose d'été. Rêverie, Op. 66 (1860)
- Je t'aimerai. Nocturne pour piano sur la mélodie de G. Stanzieri, Op. 71 (1862)
- Dormez, petits oiseaux. Rêverie sur des motifs favoris d'Etienne Arnaud, Op. 73 (1862)
- Caprice sur Stradella, de F. de Flotow, Op. 78 (1863)
- Marguerite, fermez les yeux. Berceuse sur la célèbre mélodie d' Aug. de Saint-Priest, Op. 84 (1863)
- Fantaisie élégante sur l'opéra de Rossini, le Barbier de Séville, Op. 89 (1864)
- Bouquet fané. Rêverie sur une mélodie favorite de Paul Henrion, Op. 92 (1864)
- Pamina. Polka brillante sur La Flûte enchantée de Mozart, Op. 96 (1865)
- Rêverie sur l'Africaine, opéra de Meyerbeer, Op. 98 (1865)
- Don Juan de Mozart. Fantaisie, Op. 101 (1866)
- Au clair de la lune (1870)
- Trois nouvelles fantaisies (1873)
- Les Cloches du soir. Méditation (1874)
- La Jeune mère. Berceuse de Schubert (1877)
- Marie-Jeanne. Polka (1878)
- Sabre de bois. Quadrille sans octaves (1878)
- Air arabe. Souvenir d'Alger (1879)
- La Camargo, de Ch. Lecocq. Fantaisie (1879)
- Coucou. Bluette (1879)
- La Cantinière. Fantaisie élégante sur la pièce de Robert Planquette (1881)
- Le Jour et la nuit. Fantaisie sur l'opéra-bouffe de Ch. Lecocq (1882)
- Le Chevalier Jean. Fantaisie élégante sur l'opéra de V. Joncières (1883)
- Les Violettes. Rêverie sur la célèbre mélodie de Félicie Rameau (1883)
- Où vont les Hirondelles? Rêverie-valse (1884)
- Pensez à moi! Crie l'Alsace à la France. Romance sans paroles (1884)
- L'Orage (1885)
- Air égyptien (1886)
- Le Rossignol des blés, de Théodore Bonnay (1886)
- Gais refrains alsaciens pour piano à 6 mains (1887)
- Les Fils d'Alsace. Marche militaire (1888)
- Deux Valses alsaciennes (1889)
- Les Echos de l'Helvétie. Fantaisie mignonne sur l'opéra Guillaume Tell (1890)
- L'Oracle des Marguerites. Caprice (1895)

=== Pedagogical works ===
- Méthode de piano extrêmement facile, Op. 69 (1861)
- Le Mécanisme parfait du pianiste (1875)
- Echelle chromatique. 30 Exercices pour atteindre la virtuosité (1888)
- Méthode d'harmonium ou orgue expressif (1888)

=== Organ and harmonium music ===
- Divers Morceaux pour Versets et antiennes, tirés des grands maitres, et deux offertoires et un verset pour orgue ou harmonium (1855)
- Le Mélodium. Nouvelle collection de morceaux de salon et de pièces religieuses pour orgue-melodium (1856)
- Andantino pour harmonium (1864)
- Élévation, avec orage ad lib. (1883)
- Chants sacrés. Mélodies harmonisées et transcrites pour harmonium (1884)

== Bibliography ==
Entries in reference works as "Jean Charles Hess" in:

- Paul Frank, Wilhelm Altmann (eds): Kurzgefasstes Tonkünstler-Lexikon (Regensburg: Gustave Bosse, 1936), p. 249.
- Carlo Schmidl: Dizionario universale dei musicisti: Supplemento (Milan: Sonzogno, 1938)
- Pierre Guillot: Dictionnaire des organistes français des XIXe et XXe siècles (Sprimont: Éditions Mardaga, 2003)
