= Wissenschaftliche Buchgesellschaft =

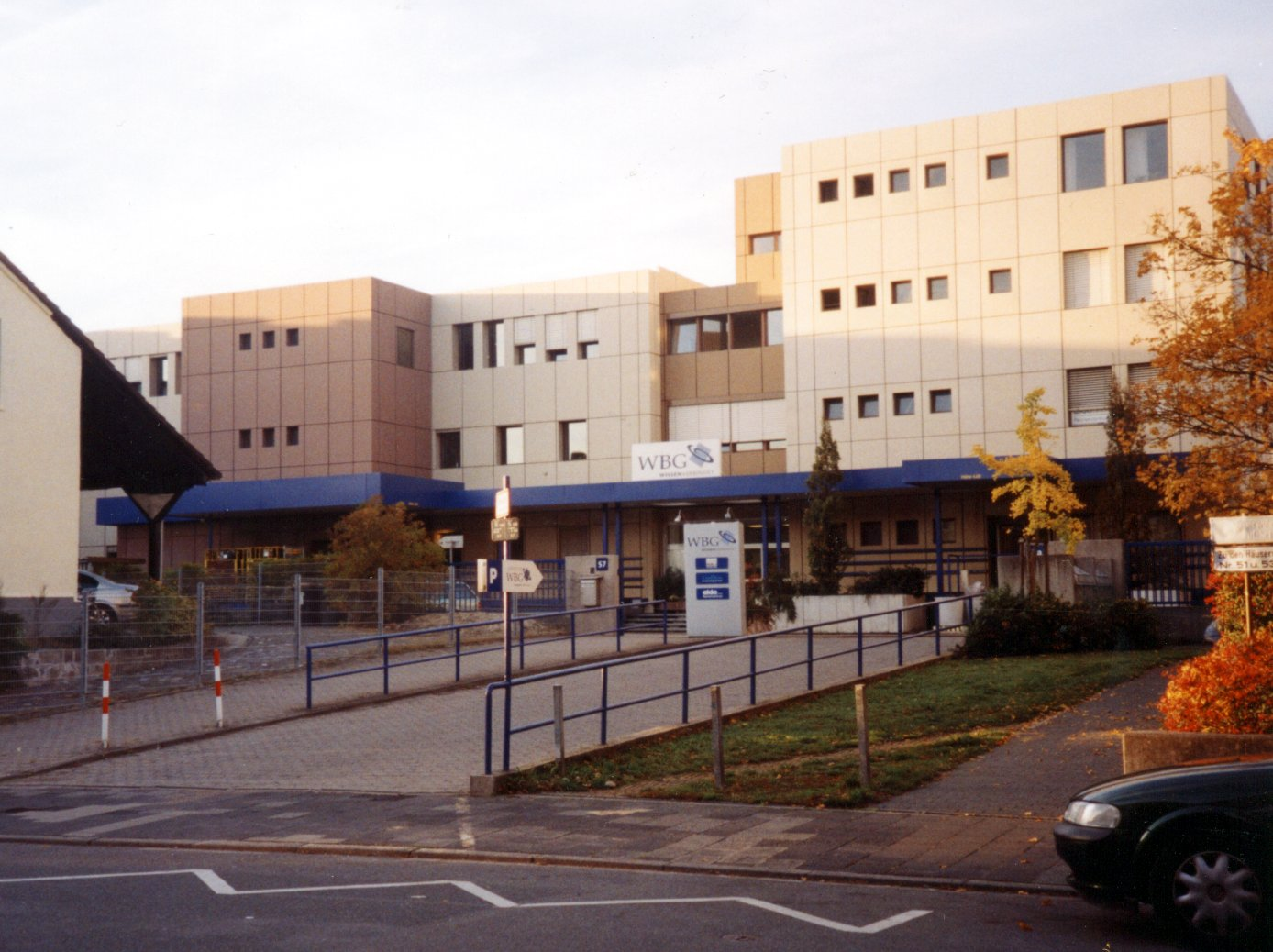
The WBG headquarters in Darmstadt

The Wissenschaftliche Buchgesellschaft (WBG) was a German publishing house in Darmstadt. With about 60,000 subscribers (as of 2023) it was one of the largest book clubs in Germany.

German scientists founded the WBG in 1949 as a voluntary association to help with the shortage of scientific literature after World War II. Its aim was to publish new books and to reprint standard works, scarce in that era. The company's principal founder and first managing director was Ernst Anrich. One of its founding members was the philosopher Wilhelm Weischedel.

Nowadays the WBG publishes works from about 20 fields of study, sent by mail order to its members. About a third of its programme is reprints of other publishers' scientific works.

These publishers belong to the WBG:

- Primus-Verlag, Darmstadt (founded 1996)
- Konrad Theiss Verlag, Stuttgart (taken over 1997)
- Verlag Philipp von Zabern, Mainz (taken over 2005)

== See also ==
- Books in Germany

== Sources ==
- Wissenschaftliche Buchgesellschaft, Darmstadt: 1949 - 1974. Eine kurze Darstellung der 25 Jahre (Wissenschaftliche Buchgesellschaft, Darmstadt: 1949 - 1974. A short account of the 25 years). Darmstadt 1974
