= Rohrwiller =

- Commune
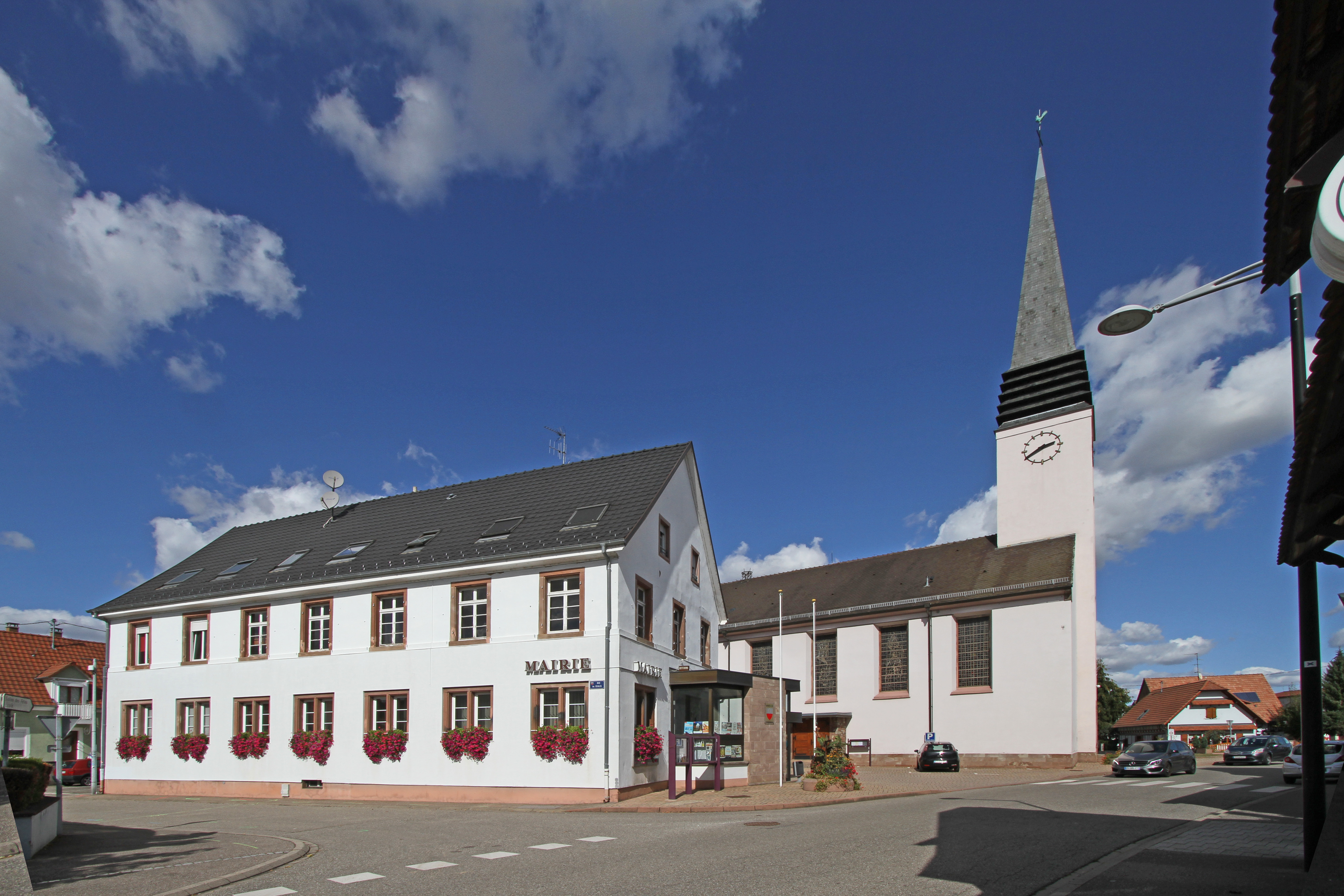
- City hall and St. Wendelin

- Coat of arms
- Location of Rohrwiller
- Location within France Location within Grand Est
- Coordinates: 48°45′23″N 7°54′21″E
- Country: France
- Region: Grand Est
- Department: Bas-Rhin
- Arrondissement: Haguenau-Wissembourg
- Canton: Bischwiller
- Intercommunality: CA Haguenau

Government
  - Mayor (2020–2026): Laurent Sutter
- Area^{1}: 2.95 km^{2} (1.14 sq mi)
- Highest elevation: 127 m (417 ft)
- Lowest elevation: 122 m (400 ft)
- Population (2023): 1,615
  - Density: 547/km^{2} (1,420/sq mi)
- Time zone: UTC+01:00 (CET)
  - Summer (DST): UTC+02:00 (CEST)
- INSEE/Postal code: 67407 /67410
- ^{1} French Land Register data, which excludes lakes, ponds, glaciers > 1 km^{2} (0.386 sq mi or 247 acres) and river estuaries.

Rohrwiller (French pronunciation: [ʁoʁvilɛʁ]; German: Rohrweiler) is a commune in the Bas-Rhin department in Grand Est in north-eastern France.

== See also ==
- Communes of the Bas-Rhin department
