= Offendorf =

Offendorf Offedorf
- Commune
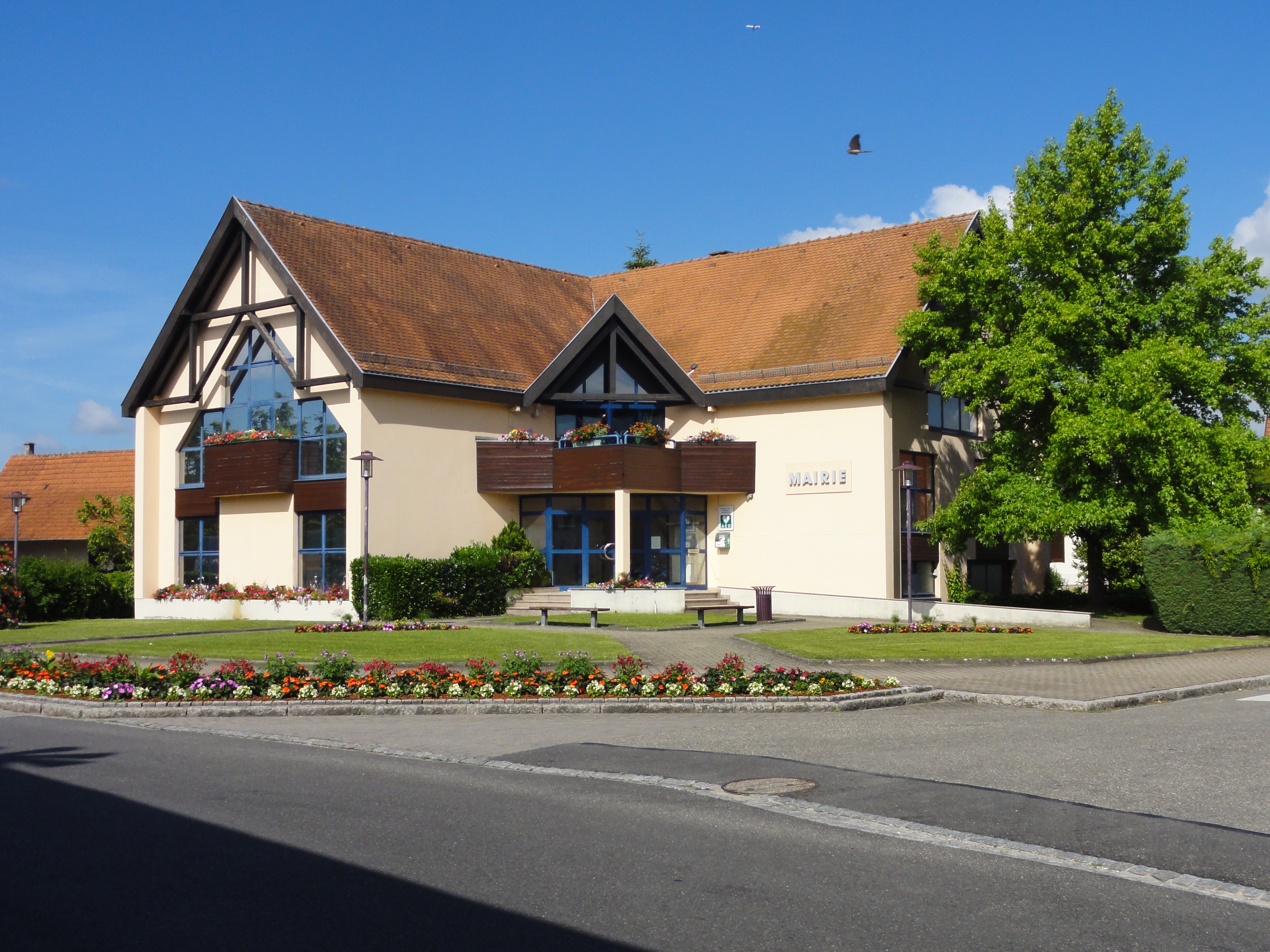
- The town hall in Offendorf

- Coat of arms
- Location of Offendorf
- Location within France Location within Grand Est
- Coordinates: 48°42′46″N 7°55′00″E
- Country: France
- Region: Grand Est
- Department: Bas-Rhin
- Arrondissement: Haguenau-Wissembourg
- Canton: Bischwiller

Government
  - Mayor (2020–2026): Denis Hommel
- Area^{1}: 14.22 km^{2} (5.49 sq mi)
- Highest elevation: 130 m (430 ft)
- Lowest elevation: 122 m (400 ft)
- Population (2023): 2,484
  - Density: 174.7/km^{2} (452.4/sq mi)
- Time zone: UTC+01:00 (CET)
  - Summer (DST): UTC+02:00 (CEST)
- INSEE/Postal code: 67356 /67850
- ^{1} French Land Register data, which excludes lakes, ponds, glaciers > 1 km^{2} (0.386 sq mi or 247 acres) and river estuaries.

Offendorf (French pronunciation: [ɔfəndɔʁf]) is a commune in the Bas-Rhin department in Grand Est in north-eastern France.

== Population ==
Historical population
| Year | Pop. | ±% p.a. |
|---|---|---|
| 1968 | 1,829 | — |
| 1975 | 1,790 | −0.31% |
| 1982 | 1,734 | −0.45% |
| 1990 | 1,640 | −0.69% |
| 1999 | 1,886 | +1.57% |
| 2007 | 2,088 | +1.28% |
| 2012 | 2,222 | +1.25% |
| 2017 | 2,476 | +2.19% |
| 2023 | 2,484 | +0.05% |
Source: INSEE

== See also ==
- Communes of the Bas-Rhin department
