= Neuhaeusel =

- Commune
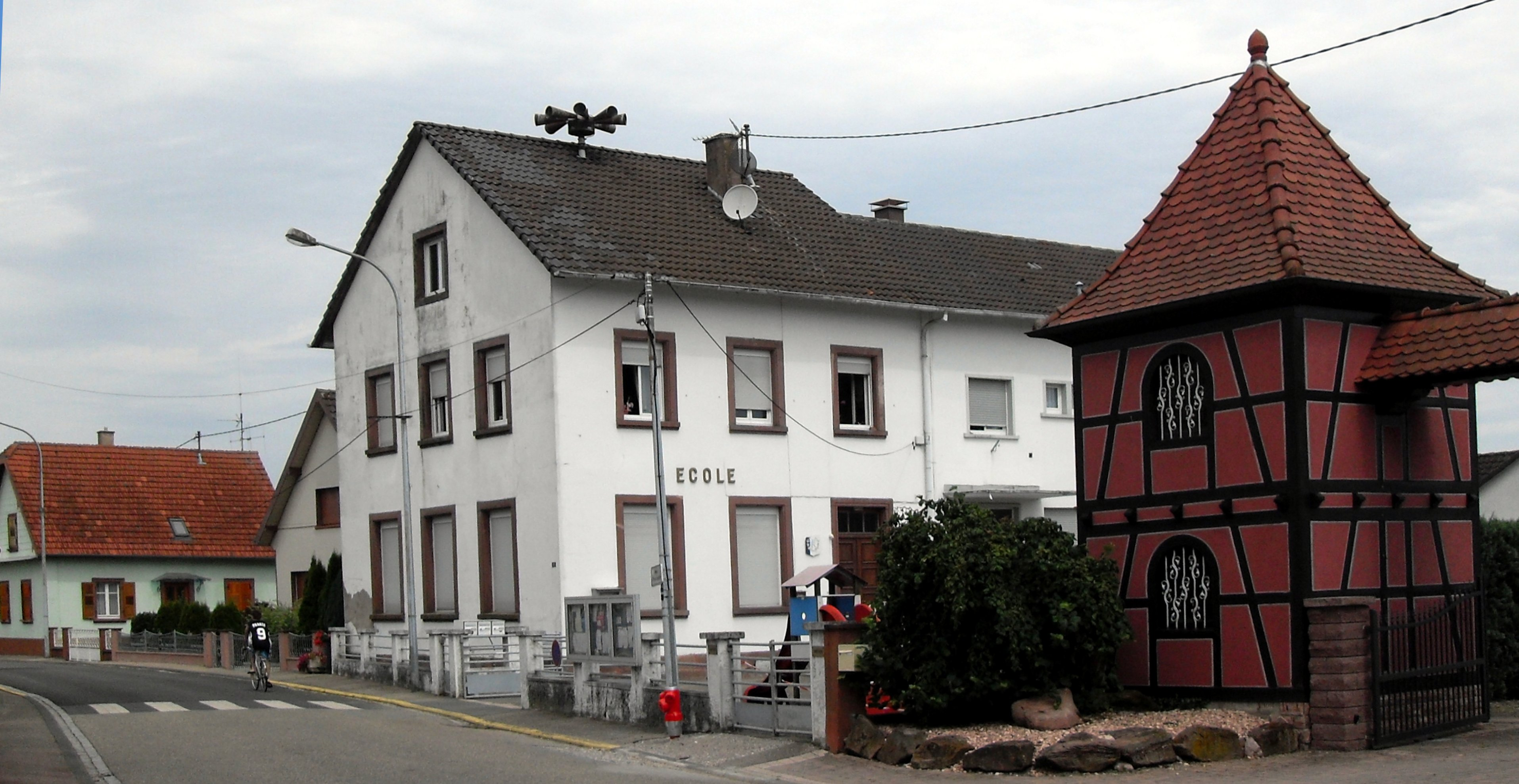
- The town hall and school in Neuhaeusel

- Coat of arms
- Location of Neuhaeusel
- Location within France Location within Grand Est
- Coordinates: 48°49′30″N 8°05′12″E
- Country: France
- Region: Grand Est
- Department: Bas-Rhin
- Arrondissement: Haguenau-Wissembourg
- Canton: Bischwiller

Government
  - Mayor (2020–2026): Sébastien Kriloff
- Area^{1}: 3.05 km^{2} (1.18 sq mi)
- Highest elevation: 119 m (390 ft)
- Lowest elevation: 114 m (374 ft)
- Population (2023): 388
  - Density: 127/km^{2} (329/sq mi)
- Time zone: UTC+01:00 (CET)
  - Summer (DST): UTC+02:00 (CEST)
- INSEE/Postal code: 67319 /67480
- ^{1} French Land Register data, which excludes lakes, ponds, glaciers > 1 km^{2} (0.386 sq mi or 247 acres) and river estuaries.

Neuhaeusel (German: Neuhäusel) is a commune in the Bas-Rhin department in Grand Est in north-eastern France.

== See also ==
- Communes of the Bas-Rhin department
