= Soufflenheim =

Soufflenheim Süfflùm
- Commune
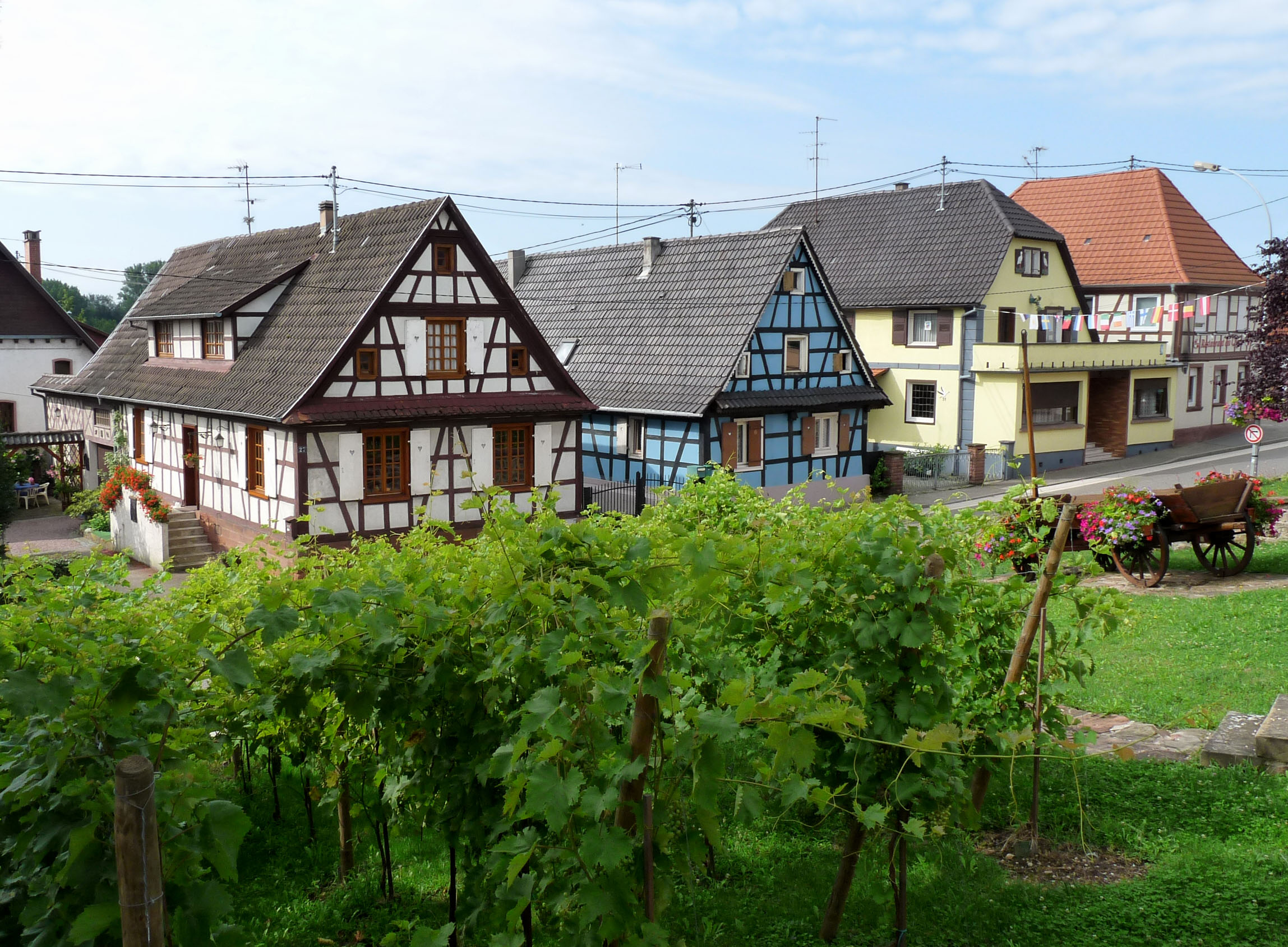
- Half-timbered houses and vineyards in Soufflenheim

- Coat of arms
- Location of Soufflenheim
- Location within France Location within Grand Est
- Coordinates: 48°50′N 7°58′E
- Country: France
- Region: Grand Est
- Department: Bas-Rhin
- Arrondissement: Haguenau-Wissembourg
- Canton: Bischwiller

Government
  - Mayor (2020–2026): Camille Scheydecker
- Area^{1}: 13.24 km^{2} (5.11 sq mi)
- Elevation: 125 m (410 ft)
- Highest elevation: 138 m (453 ft)
- Lowest elevation: 116 m (381 ft)
- Population (2023): 4,740
  - Density: 358/km^{2} (927/sq mi)
- Time zone: UTC+01:00 (CET)
  - Summer (DST): UTC+02:00 (CEST)
- INSEE/Postal code: 67472 /67620
- ^{1} French Land Register data, which excludes lakes, ponds, glaciers > 1 km^{2} (0.386 sq mi or 247 acres) and river estuaries.

Soufflenheim (French pronunciation: [suflənaim]; Alsatian: Süfflùm), is a commune in the Bas-Rhin department in Grand Est in north-eastern France. It is known for its pottery, being known as the Cité des Potiers.

== History ==
The forested area of Northern Grand Est has seen the production of pottery since the Bronze Age. This area provided a natural source of the required clay. Whether or not, and to what extent the Gauls and Romans used the area's clay is unknown. There was, however, much ancient pottery found in the area. No documentation of the settlement from this era is known to exist.

In the 9th century, Irish monks built the St. Michael church consecrated on the Kirchberg. For today's St. Michael's Church, there is no consistent connection. It is also unclear whether the plain below the hill was already built.

Soufflenheim history of medieval and early modern period coincides with that of Haguenau the Forest of Hagenau. The city was first documented in 1147. At the time, Frederick I Barbarossa granted the local potters exploitation rights to the Clay Pit within the imperial hunting ground. In this context, different stories - allegedly legends - survived, as the miraculous rescue of the emperor by a potter before a rampaging boar, as well as donations of clay nativity figurines to the emperor and his entourage.

In the late modern era the craft of pottery has declined. During the 19th Century still 30 municipalities in the region had potteries, there are now only two - Soufflenheim & Betschdorf. In 1837, Soufflenheim still had 55 pottery businesses, which employed about 600 people. In 2006, there was only one third of that.

== Geography ==
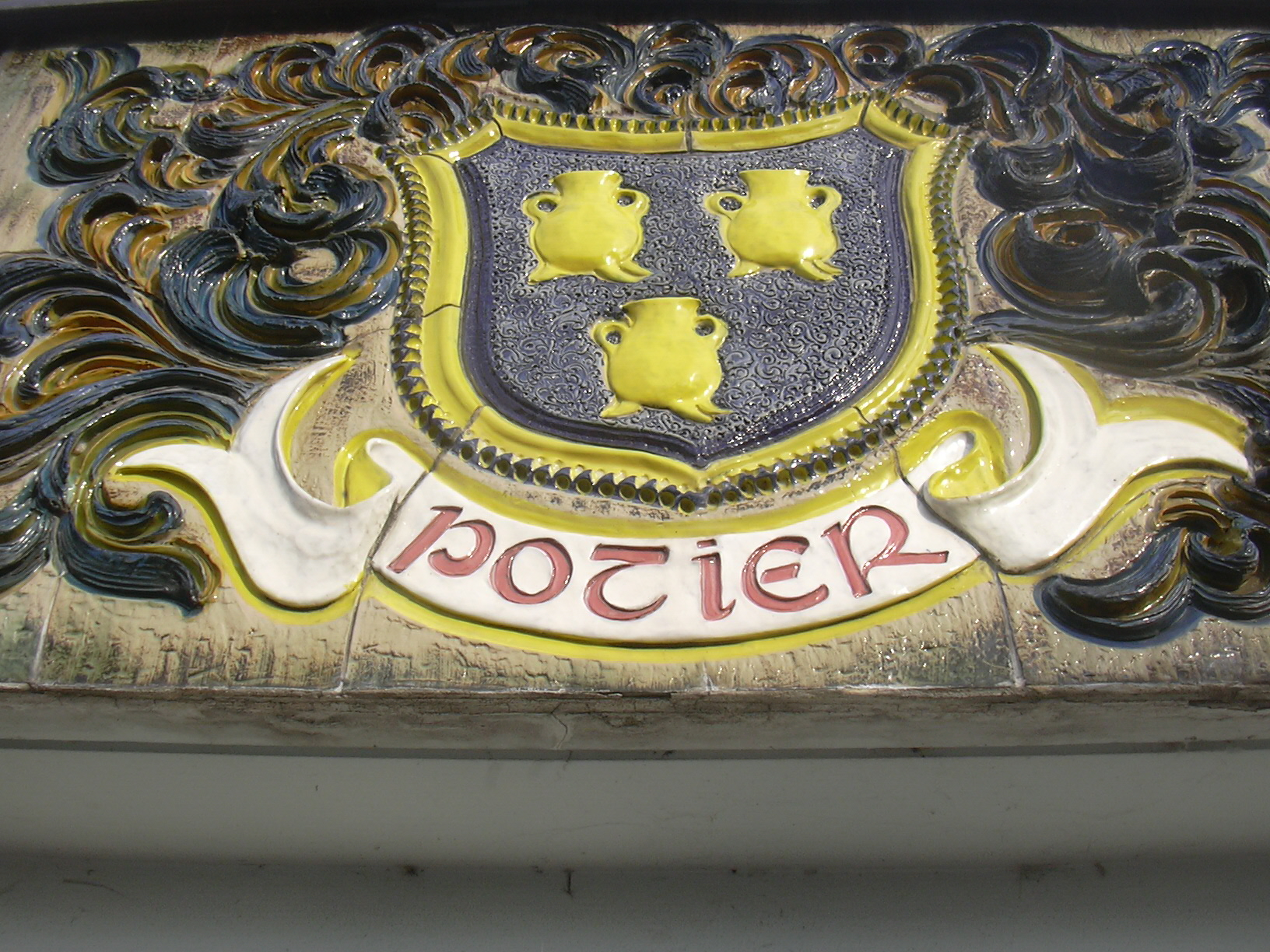
Heraldic Potters sign on the outside of a Soufflenheim building

Soufflenheim lies in the middle of a hilly forested field and meadow like countryside about 15 km (9.3 mi) east from Haguenau, 30 km (19 mi) north-east from Strasbourg and 35 km (22 mi) south-west from Karlsruhe. 5 km (3.1 mi) east flows the Rhine river.

== Population ==
Historical population
Year	Pop.	±% p.a.
1968	4,027	—
1975	4,281	+0.88%
1982	4,462	+0.59%
1990	4,269	−0.55%
1999	4,400	+0.34%
2007	4,745	+0.95%
2012	4,950	+0.85%
2017	4,889	−0.25%
2023	4,740	−0.51%
Source: INSEE

== Language ==
French is the official language of France, however Alsatian dialect is still spoken in Soufflenheim. Alsatian is the second most spoken dialect in France by number of speakers. While 39% of the adult population of Alsace speaks Alsatian dialect, only one in ten children speak it.

== People ==
- Jean-Chrisostome Hess (1816–1900), composer, pianist and organist
- Biréli Lagrène (born 1966), guitarist

== See also ==
- Communes of the Bas-Rhin department
