= Drusenheim =

- Commune
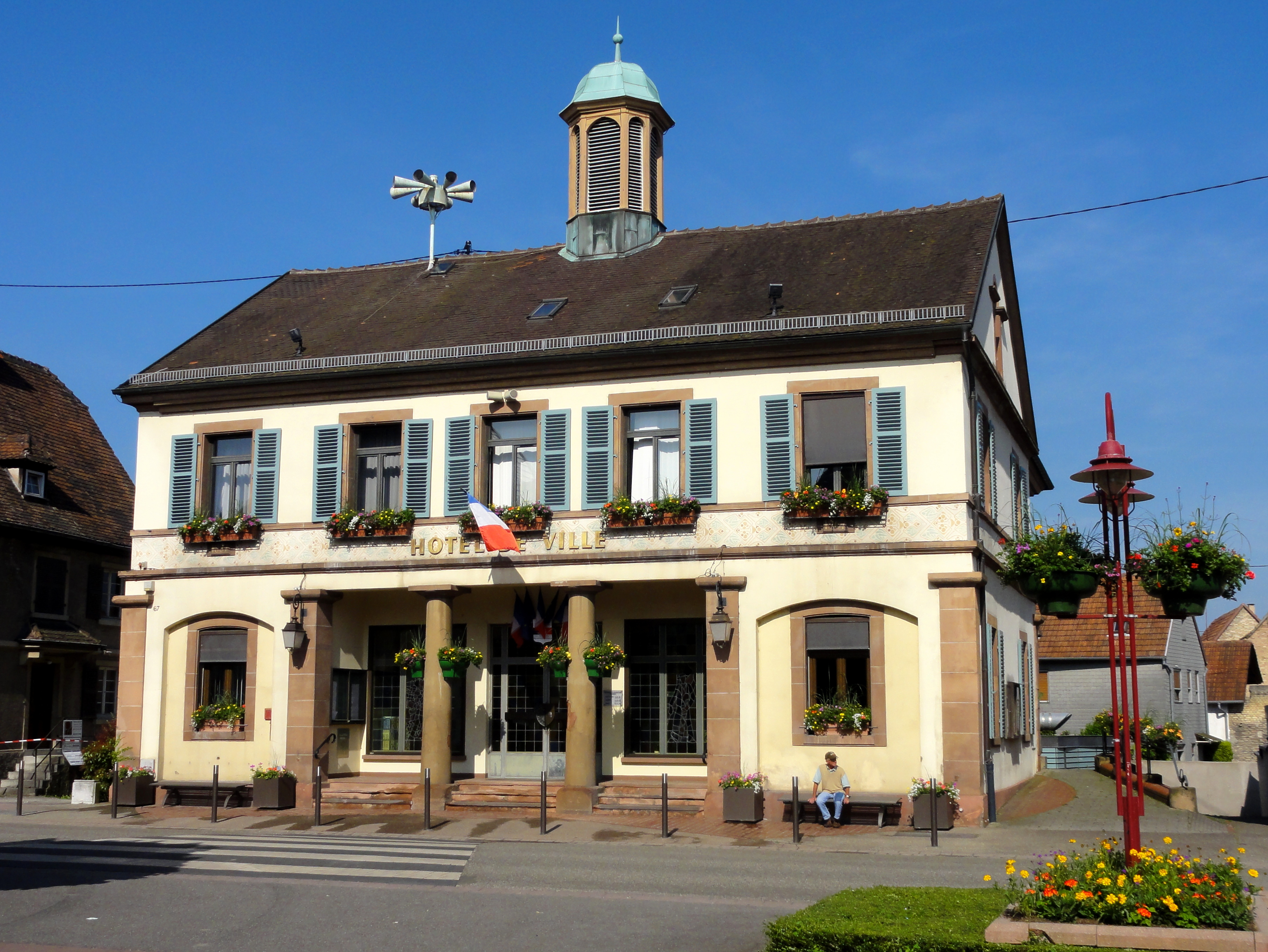
- The town hall in Drusenheim

- Coat of arms
- Location of Drusenheim
- Location within France Location within Grand Est
- Coordinates: 48°45′46″N 7°57′09″E
- Country: France
- Region: Grand Est
- Department: Bas-Rhin
- Arrondissement: Haguenau-Wissembourg
- Canton: Bischwiller

Government
  - Mayor (2020–2026): Jacky Keller
- Area^{1}: 15.73 km^{2} (6.07 sq mi)
- Highest elevation: 128 m (420 ft)
- Lowest elevation: 119 m (390 ft)
- Population (2023): 5,388
  - Density: 342.5/km^{2} (887.1/sq mi)
- Time zone: UTC+01:00 (CET)
  - Summer (DST): UTC+02:00 (CEST)
- INSEE/Postal code: 67106 /67410
- ^{1} French Land Register data, which excludes lakes, ponds, glaciers > 1 km^{2} (0.386 sq mi or 247 acres) and river estuaries.

Drusenheim (French pronunciation: [dʁyzənaim] or French pronunciation: [dʁuzənaim]) is a commune in the Bas-Rhin département in Grand Est in north-eastern France, situated on the bank of the Rhine.

== History ==
Drusenheim was fortified by the military architect Jean Maximilien Welsch in 1705.

== Population ==
Historical population
Year	Pop.	±% p.a.
1968	3,335	—
1975	3,827	+1.99%
1982	4,309	+1.71%
1990	4,363	+0.16%
1999	4,723	+0.88%
2007	5,028	+0.79%
2012	5,089	+0.24%
2017	5,154	+0.25%
2023	5,388	+0.74%
Source: INSEE

== Notable people ==
- Roland Wagner (born 1955), former football international

== See also ==
- Communes of the Bas-Rhin department
