= Rœschwoog =

Rœschwoog Reschwuch (Alsatian)
- Commune
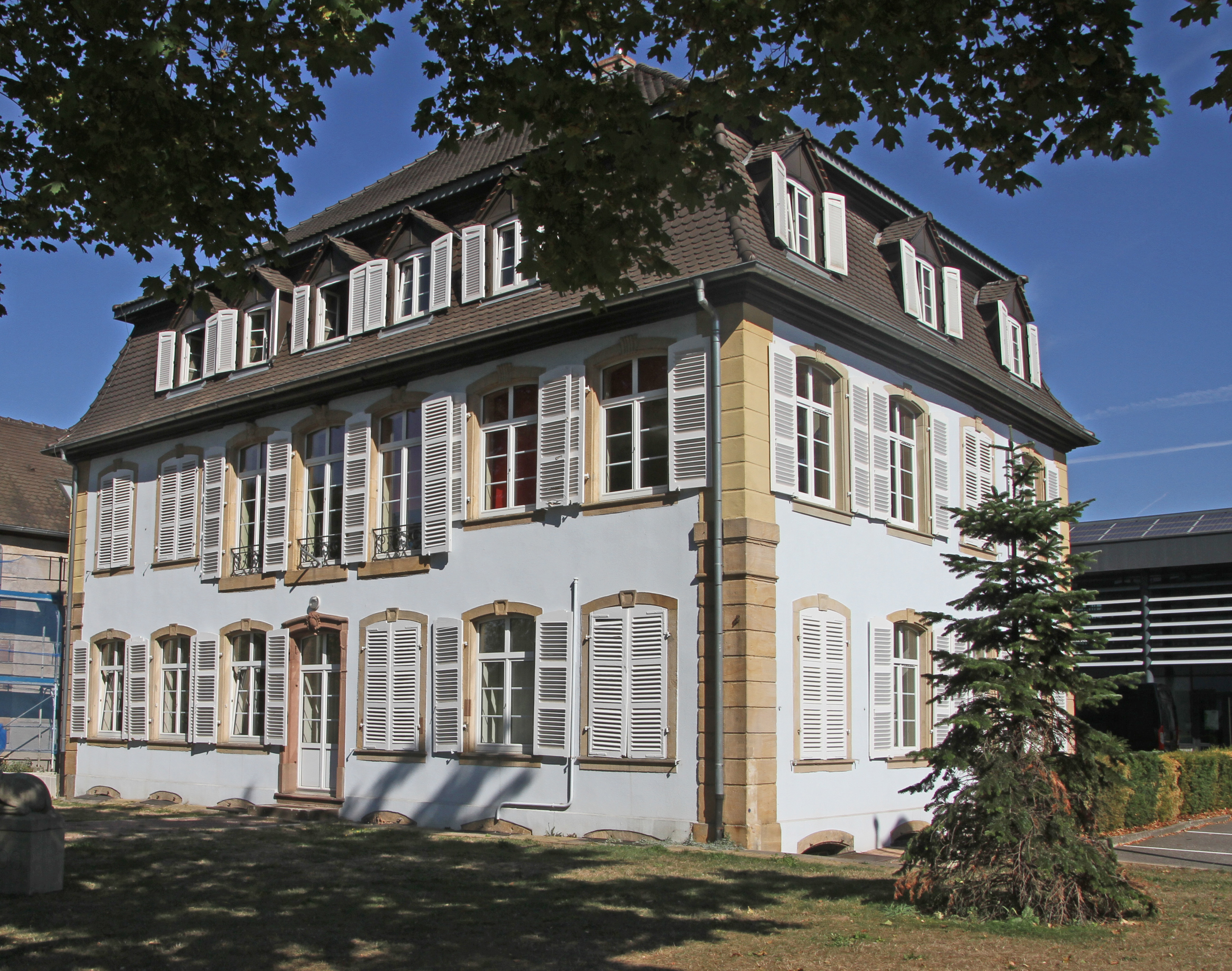
- Mairie

- Coat of arms
- Location of Rœschwoog
- Location within France Location within Grand Est
- Coordinates: 48°49′46″N 8°02′06″E
- Country: France
- Region: Grand Est
- Department: Bas-Rhin
- Arrondissement: Haguenau-Wissembourg
- Canton: Bischwiller

Government
  - Mayor (2020–2026): Michel Lorentz
- Area^{1}: 9.75 km^{2} (3.76 sq mi)
- Highest elevation: 120 m (390 ft)
- Lowest elevation: 114 m (374 ft)
- Population (2023): 2,275
  - Density: 233/km^{2} (604/sq mi)
- Time zone: UTC+01:00 (CET)
  - Summer (DST): UTC+02:00 (CEST)
- INSEE/Postal code: 67405 /67480
- ^{1} French Land Register data, which excludes lakes, ponds, glaciers > 1 km^{2} (0.386 sq mi or 247 acres) and river estuaries.

Rœschwoog (French pronunciation: [ʁœʃvoɡ]; German: Röschwoog; Alsatian: Reschwuch) is a commune in the Bas-Rhin department in Grand Est in north-eastern France.

== Population ==
Historical population
Year	Pop.	±% p.a.
1968	1,309	—
1975	1,421	+1.18%
1982	1,539	+1.15%
1990	1,573	+0.27%
1999	1,905	+2.15%
2007	2,103	+1.24%
2012	2,248	+1.34%
2017	2,285	+0.33%
2023	2,275	−0.07%
Source: INSEE

== See also ==
- Communes of the Bas-Rhin department
