= Canton of Bischwiller =

Coordinates: 48.77°N 7.86°E

- Canton
- Situation of the canton of Bischwiller in the department of Bas-Rhin
- Country: France
- Region: Grand Est
- Department: Bas-Rhin
- No. of communes: {{{nbcomm}}}
- Population (2023): 52,815
- INSEE code: 6701

The canton of Bischwiller is an administrative division of the Bas-Rhin department, northeastern France. Its borders were modified at the French canton reorganisation which came into effect in March 2015. Its seat is in Bischwiller.

It consists of the following communes:

1. Bischwiller
2. Dalhunden
3. Drusenheim
4. Forstfeld
5. Fort-Louis
6. Herrlisheim
7. Kaltenhouse
8. Kauffenheim
9. Leutenheim
10. Neuhaeusel
11. Oberhoffen-sur-Moder
12. Offendorf
13. Rœschwoog
14. Rohrwiller
15. Roppenheim
16. Rountzenheim-Auenheim
17. Schirrhein
18. Schirrhoffen
19. Sessenheim
20. Soufflenheim
21. Stattmatten
