= Rountzenheim =

Commune in Bas-Rhin, France

Rountzenheim Runzenem
- Part of Rountzenheim-Auenheim
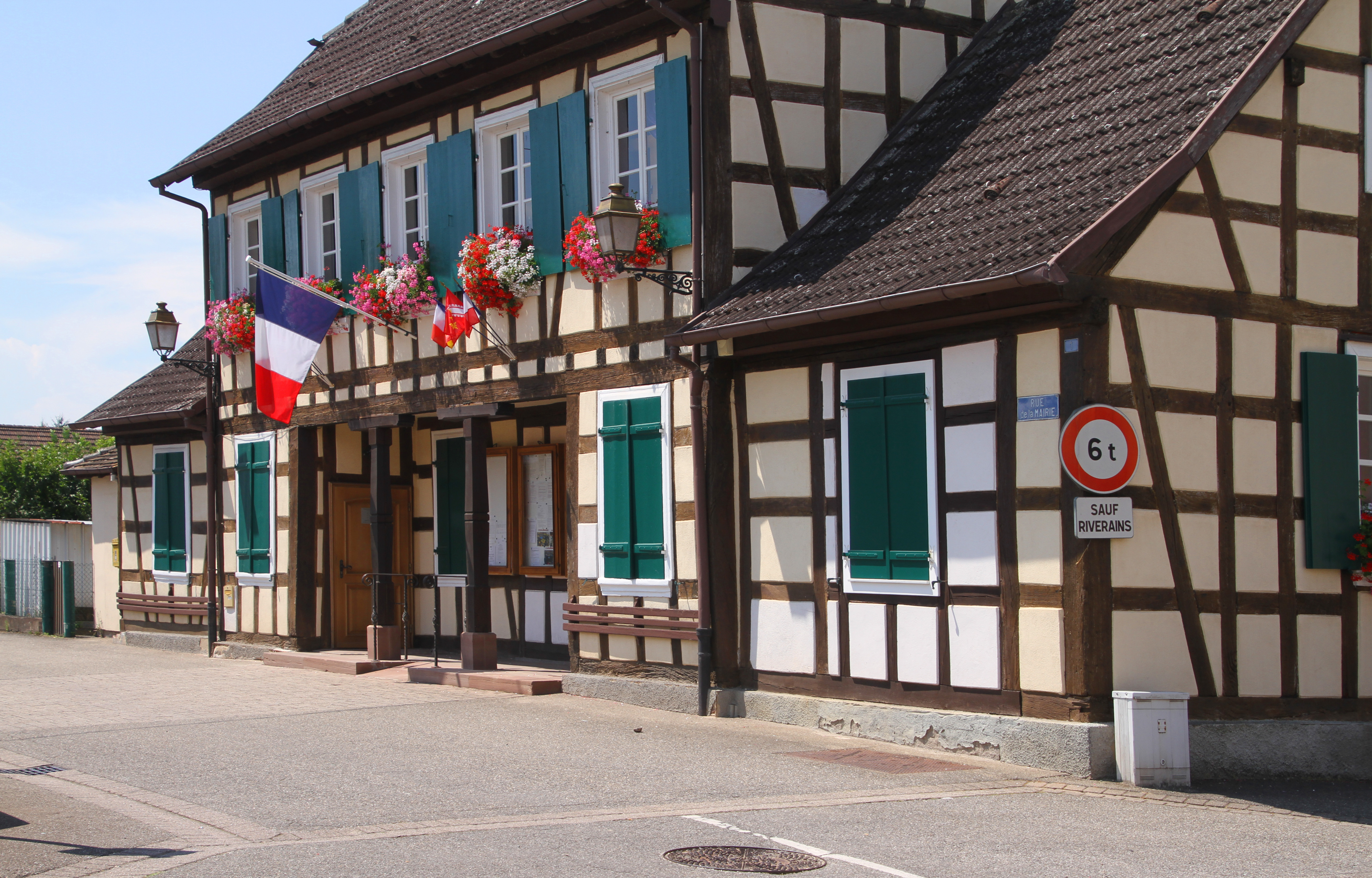
- Mairie

- Coat of arms
- Location of Rountzenheim
- Location within France Location within Grand Est
- Coordinates: 48°49′11″N 8°00′25″E
- Country: France
- Region: Grand Est
- Department: Bas-Rhin
- Arrondissement: Haguenau-Wissembourg
- Canton: Bischwiller
- Commune: Rountzenheim-Auenheim
- Area^{1}: 6.67 km^{2} (2.58 sq mi)
- Highest elevation: 121 m (397 ft)
- Lowest elevation: 116 m (381 ft)
- Population (2022): 1,093
  - Density: 164/km^{2} (424/sq mi)
- Time zone: UTC+01:00 (CET)
  - Summer (DST): UTC+02:00 (CEST)
- Postal code: 67480
- ^{1} French Land Register data, which excludes lakes, ponds, glaciers > 1 km^{2} (0.386 sq mi or 247 acres) and river estuaries.

Rountzenheim (French pronunciation: [ʁuntsənaim]; German: Runzenheim; Alsatian: Runzenem) is a former commune in the Bas-Rhin department in Grand Est in north-eastern France. On 1 January 2019, it was merged into the new commune Rountzenheim-Auenheim.

== See also ==
- Communes of the Bas-Rhin department
