= Rhedaer Bach =

River in Germany

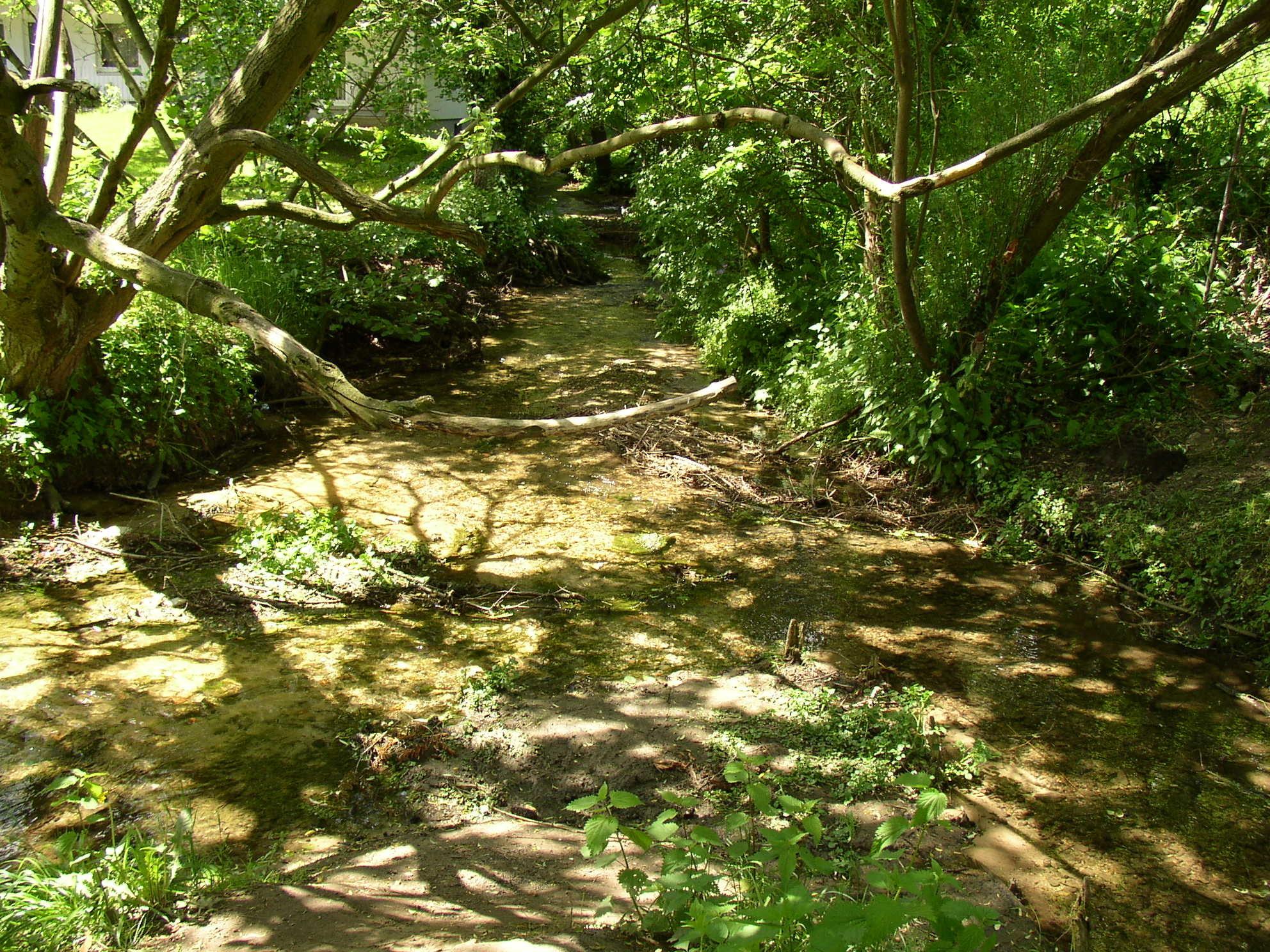

Location
- Country: Germany
- State: North Rhine-Westphalia

Physical characteristics
- Mouth
  - location: Ems
  - coordinates: 51.9562°N 8.1834°E
- Length: 23.3 km (14.5 mi)

Basin features
- Progression: Ems→ North Sea

Rhedaer Bach is a river of North Rhine-Westphalia, Germany. It flows into the Ems near Harsewinkel.

== See also ==
- List of rivers of North Rhine-Westphalia
