= A35 autoroute =

Road in France

A35 autoroute
- Autoroute des Cigognes
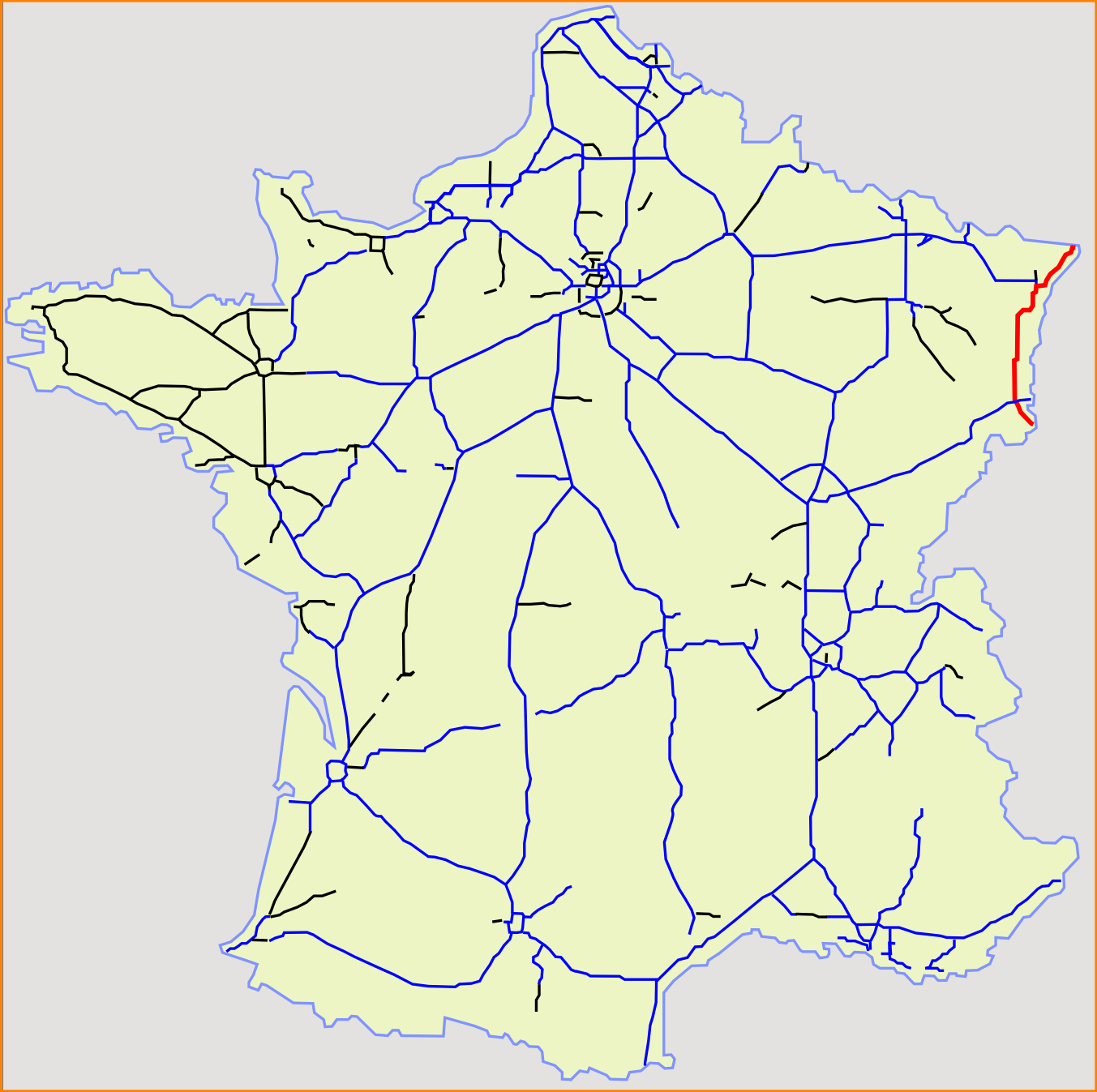

Route information
- Part of E25 / E60
- Maintained by Collectivité européenne d'Alsace
- Length: 155 km (96 mi)
- Existed: 1965–present

Major junctions
- North end: B 9 in Scheibenhard border with Germany
- E25 / A 4 in Vendenheim; E25 / A 355 in Vendenheim and Duttlenheim; A 351 in Strasbourg; A 352 in Duttlenheim; E25 / N 83 in Saint-Hippolyte and Houssen; E54 / E60 / A 36 in Sausheim
- South end: E25 / E60 / A 3 in Saint-Louis border with Switzerland

Location
- Country: France

Highway system
- Roads in France; Autoroutes; Routes nationales

The A35 autoroute is a toll free motorway in northeastern France. It is also known as the Autoroute des cigognes and the Voie Rapide du Piémont des Vosges. It connects the German border in the Rhine valley with the Swiss frontier via Strasbourg. The road forms part of European routes E25 and E60.

At the northern end, where the road reaches the German frontier, it becomes a single carriageway road controlled by a speed camera. On the German side of the frontier, plans to build a final stretch of Autobahn to connect the French A35 directly with the German A65 at Kandel were not implemented during the 1990s when the focus of Autobahn construction switched to the eastern side of the country. The project remains unimplemented: it is contentious because of the ecological impact it could have on the Bienwald (wooded area) through which the road would run.

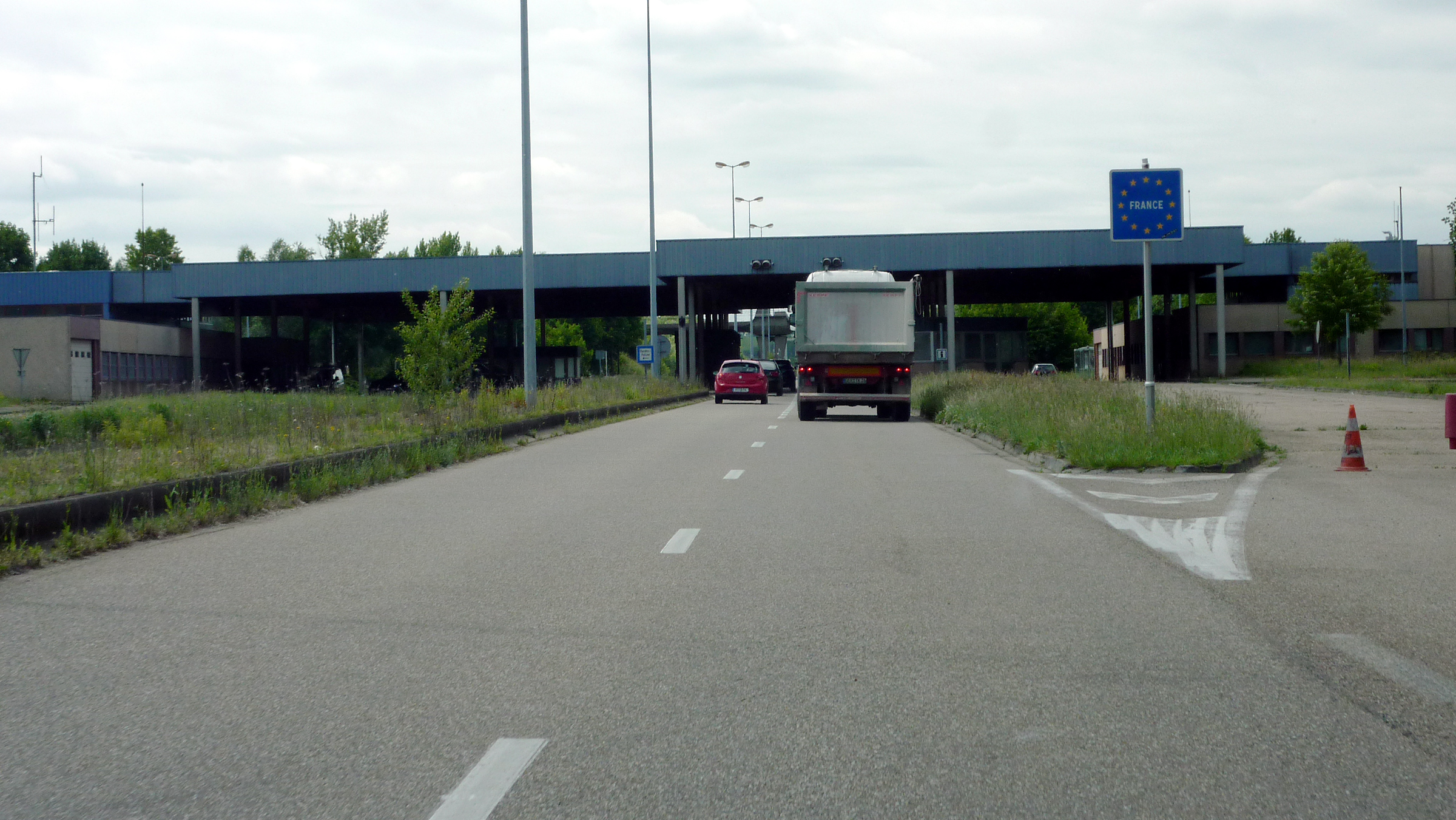
Autoroute A35 near Lauterbourg (German B9 to French A35)

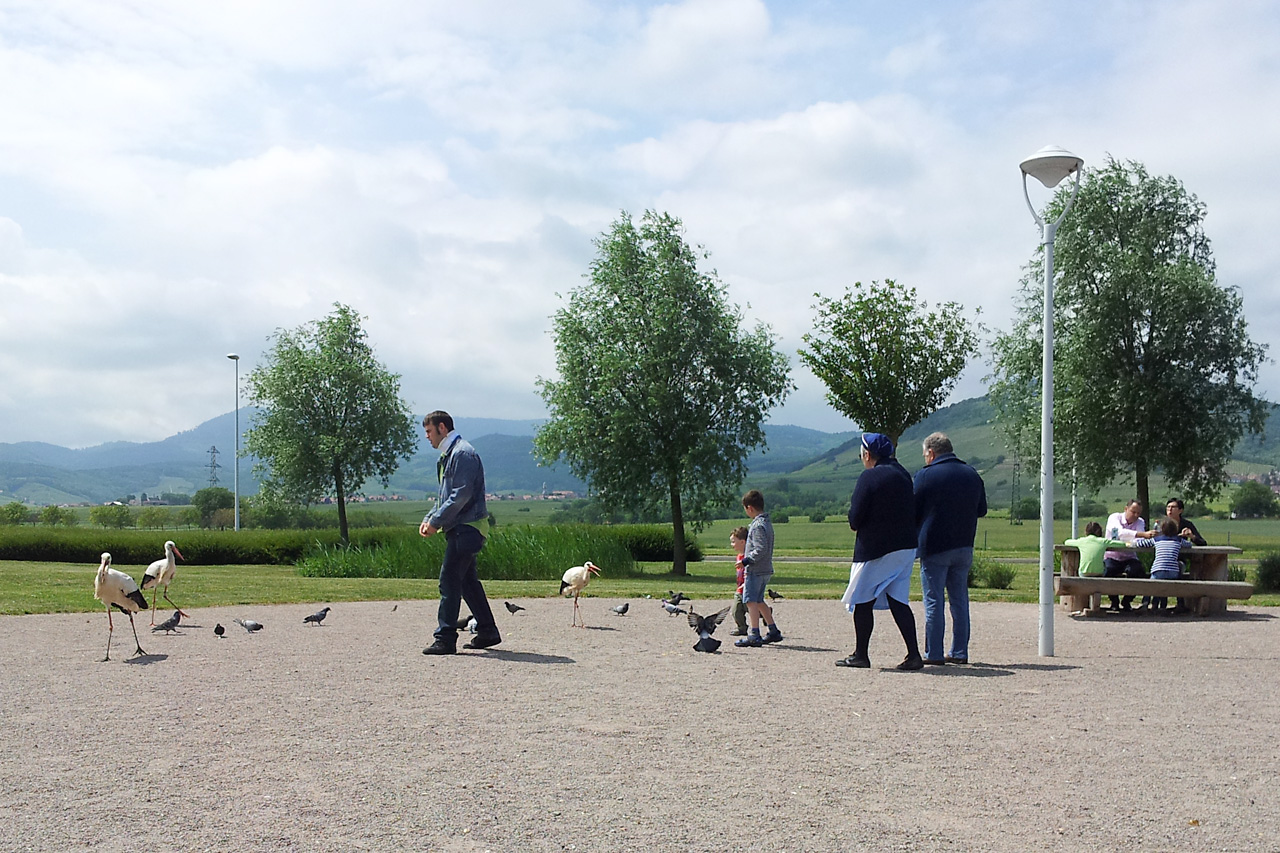
Service Area: Haut-Koenigsbourg

== Junctions ==
=== A35 North ===
Region	Department	Junction	Destinations	Notes
French - German Border ; B 9 becomes A 35
Grand Est	Collectivité européenne d'Alsace	59 : Scheibenhard	Lauterbourg, Wissembourg, Scheibenhard	
Grand Est	Collectivité européenne d'Alsace	58 : Schaffhouse	Munchhausen, Mothern, Wintzenbach	
Grand Est	Collectivité européenne d'Alsace	57 : Seltz	Seltz, Niederrœdern, Hatten, Betschdorf	
Grand Est	Collectivité européenne d'Alsace	56 : Forstfeld	Roppenheim, Beinheim, Karlsruhe, Rastatt, Baden-Baden (A5) (Germany), Bâle (Switzerland)	
Grand Est	Collectivité européenne d'Alsace	Aire de Rœschwoog (Northbound)		
Grand Est	Collectivité européenne d'Alsace	55 : Rountzenheim	Haguenau, Rountzenheim, Rœschwoog, Soufflenheim	
Grand Est	Collectivité européenne d'Alsace	54 : Sessenhaim	Sessenheim, Soufflenheim, Schirrhoffen	Entry and exit from Saint-Louis
Grand Est	Collectivité européenne d'Alsace	53 : Rohrwiller	Herrlisheim, Drusenheim, Bischwiller, Haguenau, Rohrwiller	
Grand Est	Collectivité européenne d'Alsace	52 : Offendorf	Karlsruhe, Rastatt, Baden-Baden (A5), Achern (Germany), Bâle (Switzerland)	
Grand Est	Collectivité européenne d'Alsace	51 : Gambsheim	Gambsheim, Weyersheim	
Grand Est	Collectivité européenne d'Alsace	Aire du Landgraben (Southbound); Aire de la Pfeffermatt (Northbound)		
Grand Est	Collectivité européenne d'Alsace	50 : La Wantzenau	La Wantzenau, Kilstett	
Grand Est	Collectivité européenne d'Alsace	49 : Hœrdt	Reichstett, Hœrdt	
Grand Est	Collectivité européenne d'Alsace	A4 & A355 - A35	(Paris, Nancy-Metz), Brumath, Haguenau, Schiltigheim	
Grand Est	Collectivité européenne d'Alsace	A4 & A355 - A35	Mulhouse, Port de Strasbourg, Strasbourg, Strasbourg-Entzheim	
1.000 mi = 1.609 km; 1.000 km = 0.621 mi

=== M35 ===
Region	Department	Junction	Destinations	Notes
A 4 becomes M 35
Grand Est	Collectivité européenne d'Alsace			
Grand Est	Collectivité européenne d'Alsace	48 : Reichstett	Reichstett, Mundolsheim, Vendenheim, Zone Commerciale Nord	
Grand Est	Collectivité européenne d'Alsace	49 : Hœnheim	Hœnheim, Souffelweyersheim, Niederhausbergen	
Grand Est	Collectivité européenne d'Alsace	50 : Bischheim	Bischheim, Schiltigheim, Mittelhausbergen, Espace européen de l'entreprise	
Grand Est	Collectivité européenne d'Alsace	51 : Place de Haguenau	Strasbourg - centre, Avenue des Vosges, Robertsau, Institutions Européennes	
Grand Est	Collectivité européenne d'Alsace	1 : Cronenbourg	Strasbourg - Wacken, Cronenbourg, Place des Halles	
Grand Est	Collectivité européenne d'Alsace	RM 2350 - M35	Strasbourg - Robertsau, Wacken, Cronenbourg, Place des Halles, Avenue des Vosges, Institutions Européennes	
Grand Est	Collectivité européenne d'Alsace	2 : Place des Halles	Strasbourg - Place des Halles	
Grand Est	Collectivité européenne d'Alsace	RM 351 - A35	Nancy-Metz par RD, Saverne, Hautepierre, Koenigshoffen	
Grand Est	Collectivité européenne d'Alsace	3 : Porte Blanche	Strasbourg - Porte Blanche	Entry and exit from Saint-Louis
Grand Est	Collectivité européenne d'Alsace	4 : Porte de Schirmeck	Kehl (Germany), Strasbourg - centre, Parc de l'Étoile, Meinau, Montagne Verte, Elsau, Lingolsheim, Z. I. Plaine des Bouchers	
Grand Est	Collectivité européenne d'Alsace	5 : Baggersee	Illkirch - nord, Strasbourg - Meinau, Parc d'Innovation	
Grand Est	Collectivité européenne d'Alsace	Aire d'Ostwald		
Grand Est	Collectivité européenne d'Alsace	6 : La Vigie	Illkirch-Graffenstaden, Ostwald	
Grand Est	Collectivité européenne d'Alsace	7 : Geispolsheim	Geispolsheim, Fegersheim, Lingolsheim, Strasbourg-Entzheim, Port de Strasbourg, (Offenbourg) (Germany)	
Grand Est	Collectivité européenne d'Alsace	8 : Entzheim	Duppigheim, Duttlenheim, Entzheim, Parc d'Activités Économiques	
1.000 mi = 1.609 km; 1.000 km = 0.621 mi

=== A35 south ===
Region	Department	Junction	Destinations	Notes
Grand Est	Collectivité européenne d'Alsace			
Grand Est	Collectivité européenne d'Alsace	A352 & A355 - A35	Schirmeck, Molsheim, Saint-Dié-des-Vosges par Col	Entry and exit from Scheibenhard
Grand Est	Collectivité européenne d'Alsace	A352 & A355 - A35	Paris, Nancy-Metz (A4), Karlsruhe (A35 Nord), Strasbourg	
Grand Est	Collectivité européenne d'Alsace	9 : Innenheim	Innenheim, Duttlenheim	
Grand Est	Collectivité européenne d'Alsace	10 : Bischoffsheim	Bischoffsheim, Z. I. Obernai, Krautergersheim	
Grand Est	Collectivité européenne d'Alsace	11 : Obernai	Obernai, Niedernai, Mont Sainte-Odile	Entry and exit from Scheibenhard
Grand Est	Collectivité européenne d'Alsace	11.1 : Schirmeck	Schirmeck, Molsheim, Rosheim, Z. I. Obernai	Entry and exit from Saint-Louis
Grand Est	Collectivité européenne d'Alsace	12 : Benfeld	Benfeld, Barr, Valff, Goxwiller, Obernai, Niedernai	
Grand Est	Collectivité européenne d'Alsace	13 : Barr	Epfig, Mittelbergheim, Zellwiller, Barr, Barr - Z. A.	
Grand Est	Collectivité européenne d'Alsace	14 : Erstein	Erstein, Benfeld, Kogenheim	
Grand Est	Collectivité européenne d'Alsace	15 : Ebersheim	Scherwiller, Dambach-la-Ville, Ebersheim	
Grand Est	Collectivité européenne d'Alsace	16 : Sélestat - nord	Sélestat - centre, Ebersmunster, Ebersheim, Epfig, Dambach-la-Ville, Scherwiller, Z. I. Nord	
Grand Est	Collectivité européenne d'Alsace	17 : Sélestat - ouest	Nancy, Fribourg-en-Brisgau, Saint-Dié-des-Vosges, Sainte-Marie-aux-Mines, Villé, Sélestat	
Grand Est	Collectivité européenne d'Alsace	Aire du Haut-Koenigsbourg		
Grand Est	Collectivité européenne d'Alsace	18 : Saint-Hippolyte	Sélestat - centre, Saint-Hippolyte, Haut-Koenigsbourg	
Grand Est	Collectivité européenne d'Alsace	E25 / A 35 becomes E25 / D 83		
Grand Est	Collectivité européenne d'Alsace	19 : Bergheim	Bergheim	Entry to Scheibenhard and exit from Saint-Louis
Grand Est	Collectivité européenne d'Alsace	20 : Guémar	Ribeauvillé, Illhaeusern, Guémar, Bergheim, Marckolsheim	
Grand Est	Collectivité européenne d'Alsace	21 : Ostheim - nord	Riquewihr, Beblenheim, Ostheim	Entry and exit from Scheibenhard
Grand Est	Collectivité européenne d'Alsace	22 : Ostheim - sud	Ribeauvillé, Riquewihr, Beblenheim, Ostheim	
Grand Est	Collectivité européenne d'Alsace	23 : Houssen	Colmar, Munster, Kaysersberg, Bennwihr, Houssen, Aérodrome	
Grand Est	Collectivité européenne d'Alsace	E25 / D 83 becomes again E25 / A 35		
Grand Est	Collectivité européenne d'Alsace	24 : Colmar - nord	Nancy, Saint-Dié-des-Vosges par Col, Épinal, Kaysersberg, Zones économiques	
Grand Est	Collectivité européenne d'Alsace	25 : Colmar - est	Fribourg-en-Brisgau, Neuf-Brisach, Horbourg-Wihr, Colmar - sud, Colmar - Semm	
Grand Est	Collectivité européenne d'Alsace	26 : Colmar-sud	Colmar - centre	Entry and exit from Saint-Louis
Grand Est	Collectivité européenne d'Alsace	Aire du Fronholtz (Southbound)		
Grand Est	Collectivité européenne d'Alsace	27 : Sainte-Croix-en-Plaine	Sainte-Croix-en-Plaine, Herrlisheim-près-Colmar, Sundhoffen	
Grand Est	Collectivité européenne d'Alsace	28 : Niederhergheim	Niederhergheim, Herrlisheim-près-Colmar, Munster, Gérardmer	
Grand Est	Collectivité européenne d'Alsace	Aire de la Plaine (Northbound)		
Grand Est	Collectivité européenne d'Alsace	29 : Niederentzen	Rouffach, Guebwiller, Niederentzen	
Grand Est	Collectivité européenne d'Alsace	30 : Meyenheim	Meyenheim	Entry and exit from Scheibenhard
Grand Est	Collectivité européenne d'Alsace	31 : Ensisheim	Ensisheim, Meyenheim, Guebwiller, Neuf-Brisach, Écomusée	
Grand Est	Collectivité européenne d'Alsace	Aire de Battenheim (Northbound)		
Grand Est	Collectivité européenne d'Alsace	32 : Sausheim	Sausheim, Kingersheim, Wittenheim	
Grand Est	Collectivité européenne d'Alsace	A36 - A35	Mulhouse, Lyon, Paris (A6), Lörrach (A5) (Germany), Usine Peugeot	
Grand Est	Collectivité européenne d'Alsace	33 : Rixheim	Habsheim, Rixheim	
Grand Est	Collectivité européenne d'Alsace	34 : Sierentz	Sierentz, Kembs	
Grand Est	Collectivité européenne d'Alsace	35 : Bartenheim	Bartenheim	
Grand Est	Collectivité européenne d'Alsace	36 : EuroAirport	EuroAirport Basel Mulhouse Freiburg, Blotzheim	
Grand Est	Collectivité européenne d'Alsace	37 : Saint-Louis	Lörrach (Germany), Saint-Louis, Huningue, Hésingue, Altkirch, Blotzheim	
French - Swiss Border ; E25 / E60 / A 35 becomes Swiss road E25 / E60 / A 3
1.000 mi = 1.609 km; 1.000 km = 0.621 mi
