= Horbourg-Wihr =

Commune in Grand Est, France

- Commune
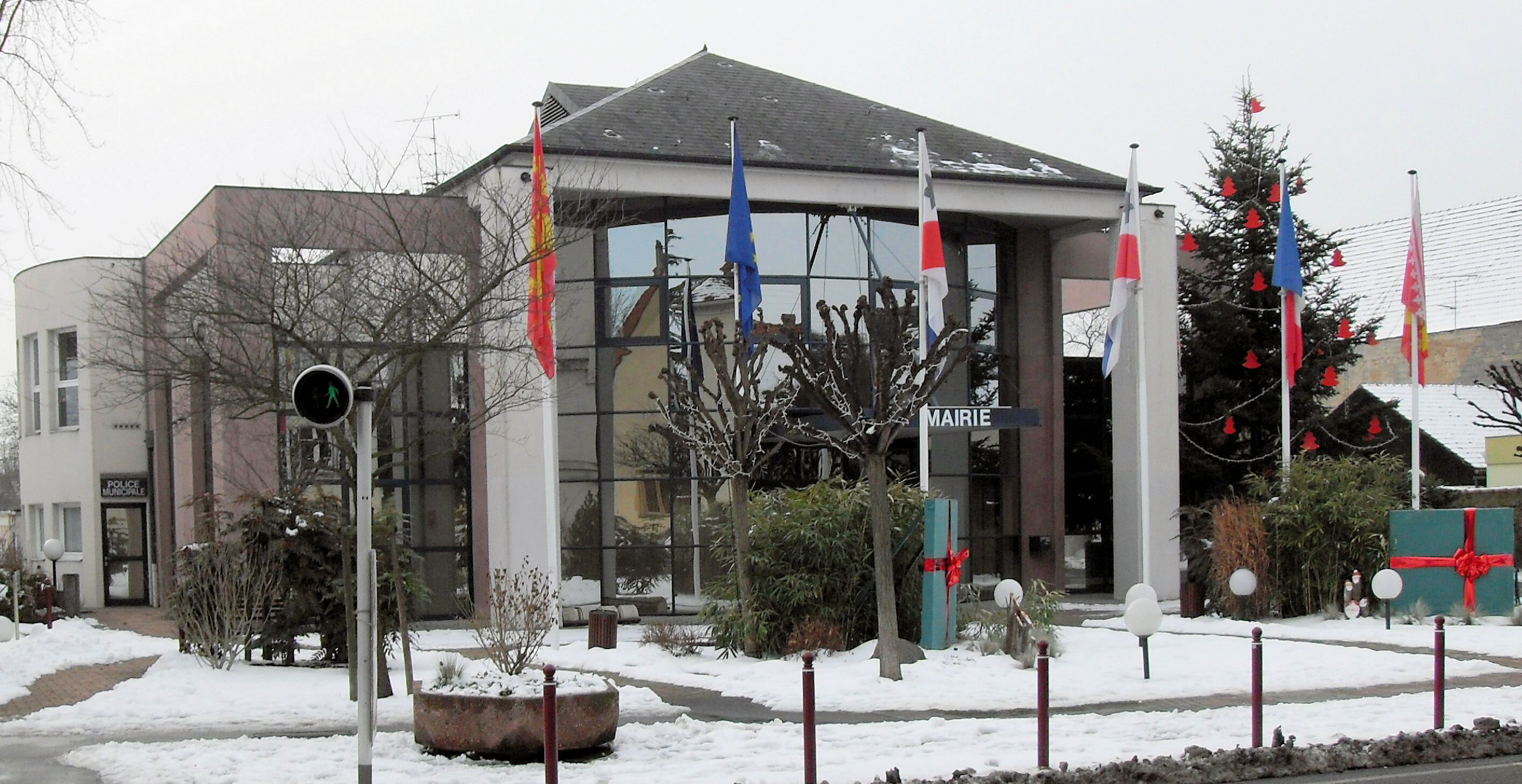
- The town hall in Horbourg-Wihr

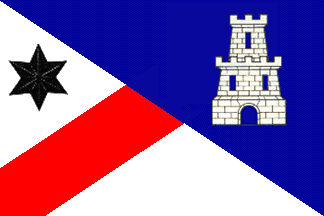
- Flag Coat of arms
- Location of Horbourg-Wihr
- Location within France Location within Grand Est
- Coordinates: 48°04′48″N 7°23′43″E
- Country: France
- Region: Grand Est
- Department: Haut-Rhin
- Arrondissement: Colmar-Ribeauvillé
- Canton: Colmar-2
- Intercommunality: Colmar Agglomération

Government
  - Mayor (2020–2026): Thierry Stoebner
- Area^{1}: 9.42 km^{2} (3.64 sq mi)
- Elevation: 186 m (610 ft)
- Highest elevation: 190 m (620 ft)
- Lowest elevation: 182 m (597 ft)
- Population (2023): 6,199
  - Density: 658/km^{2} (1,700/sq mi)
- Time zone: UTC+01:00 (CET)
  - Summer (DST): UTC+02:00 (CEST)
- INSEE/Postal code: 68145 /68180
- Website: https://www.horbourg-wihr.fr/
- ^{1} French Land Register data, which excludes lakes, ponds, glaciers > 1 km^{2} (0.386 sq mi or 247 acres) and river estuaries.

Horbourg-Wihr (French pronunciation: [ɔʁbuʁ viʁ]; German: Horburg-Weier; Alsatian: Horwrig-Wihr) is a commune in the Haut-Rhin department in Grand Est in north-eastern France. It is located near Colmar.

== History ==
In 2026, excavations ahead of housing construction uncovered houses, hearths and wells from the 1st to 3rd centuries, and a small cemetery used in the second half of the 5th century, with 11 adult and 3 child graves and two horse burials.

The County of Horburg, named after the principal town, came into possession of the Counts of Württemberg in 1324 and, like the county of Montbéliard and the lordship of Reichenweier, formed part of their property on the left bank of the Rhine. During the Reformation, the dukes of Württemberg introduced protestantism, and the area became Lutheran. The following places were part of the county of Horburg: Algolsheim, Andolsheim, Appenweier, Bischweier, Dürrenenzen, Fortschweier, Horburg, Munzenheim, Sundhofen, Volgelsheim, and Wolfgangen.

In Horburg there was a castle of the Dukes of Württemberg, which however was completely destroyed; only one portal can still be seen at today's town hall.

In 1748 the county of Horburg came under French sovereignty and was officially ceded to France in 1793 with the other possessions on the left bank of the Rhine. Horbourg and Wihr-en-Plaine were two autonomous municipalities until their merger in 1973. Horbourg-Wihr has a very rich history with the remains of Roman, Merovingian, and the lords of Horbourg and of Württemberg (1324–1796) in Horbourg, and Habsburg and Ribeaupierre/Rappoltstein in Wihr.

In Wihr-en-Plaine there is the 12th century Church of Saint-Michel, shared by the Catholics and Lutherans, with murals from the 16th century.

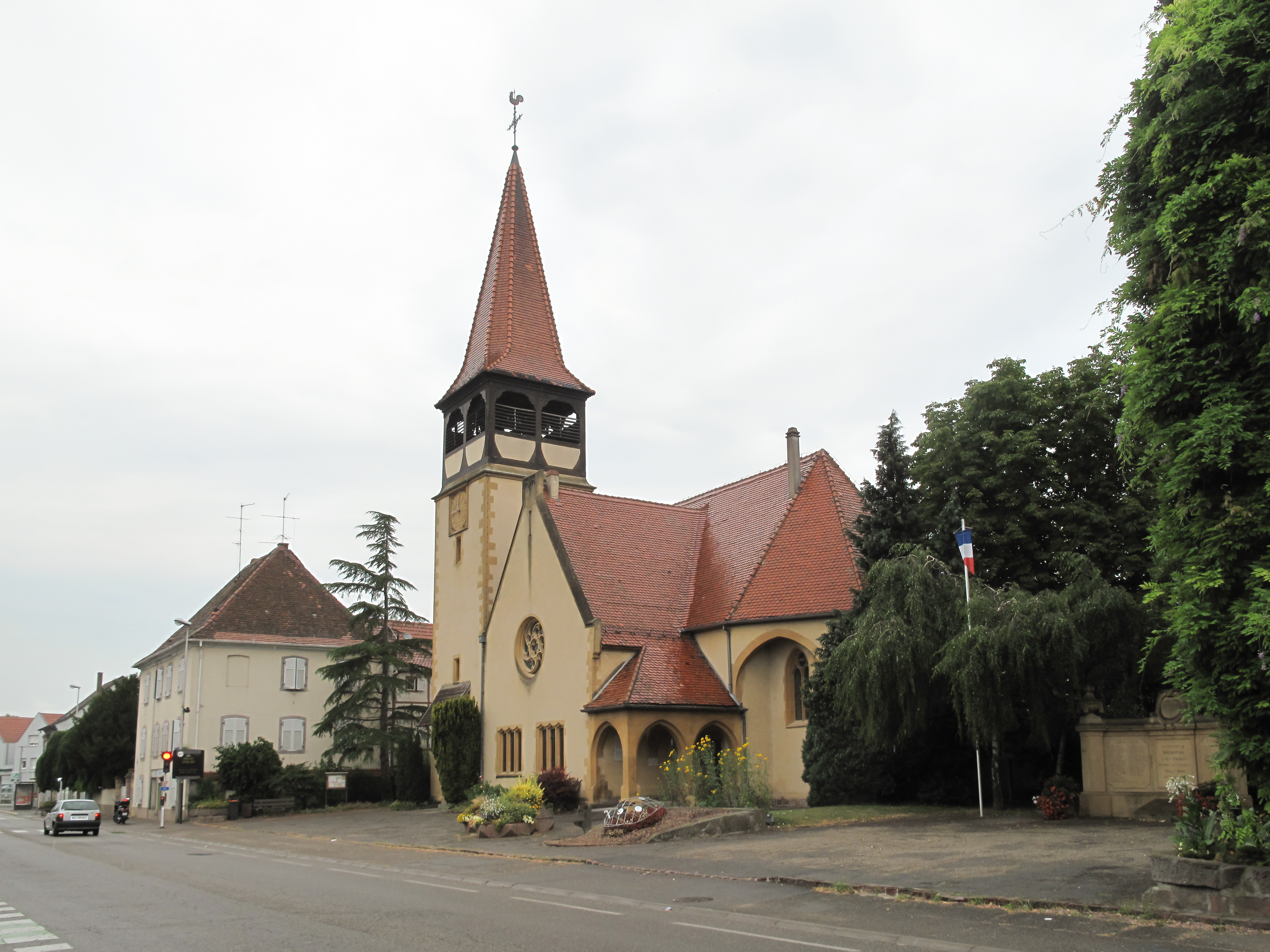
Reformed church

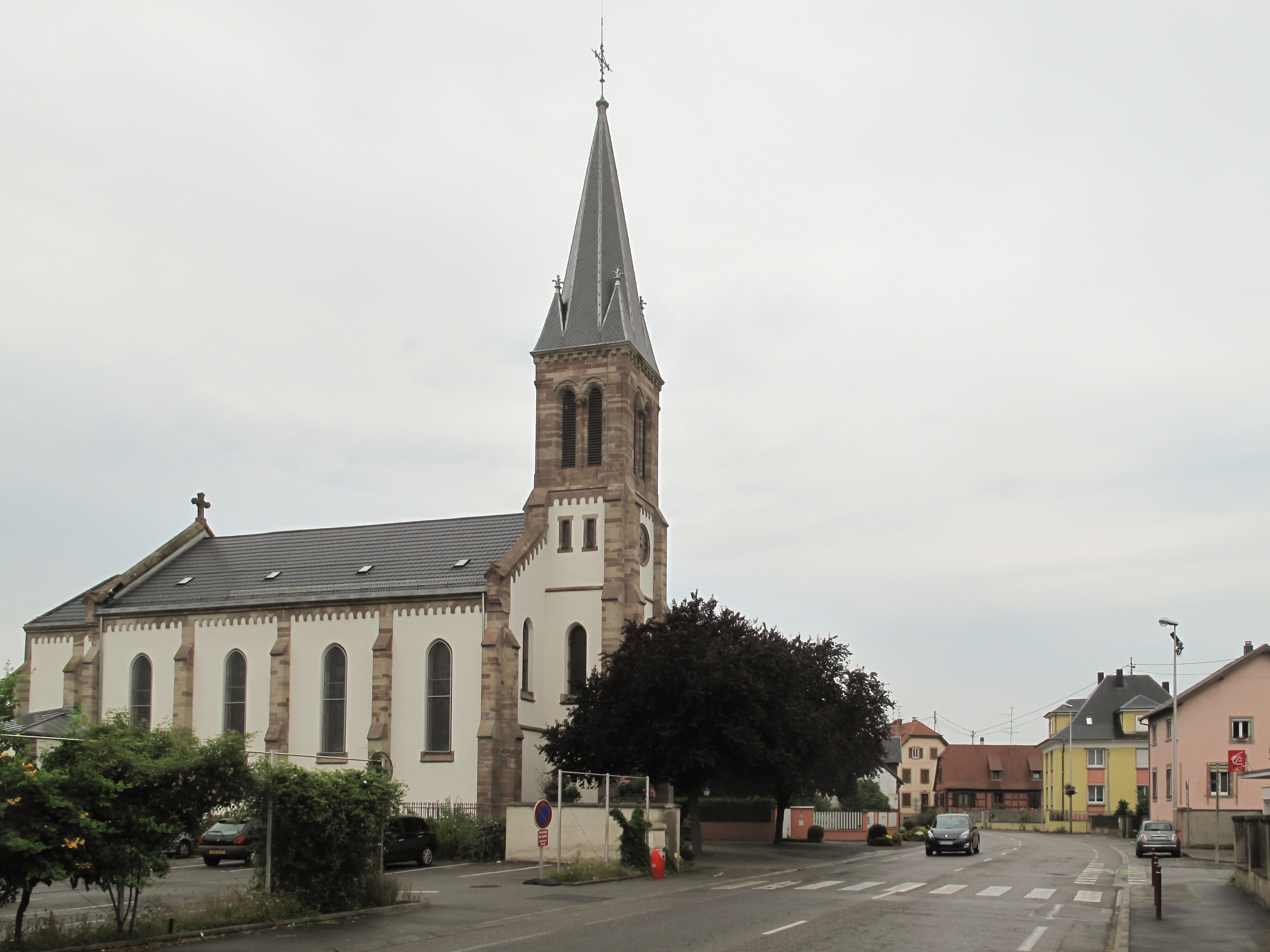
Catholic church

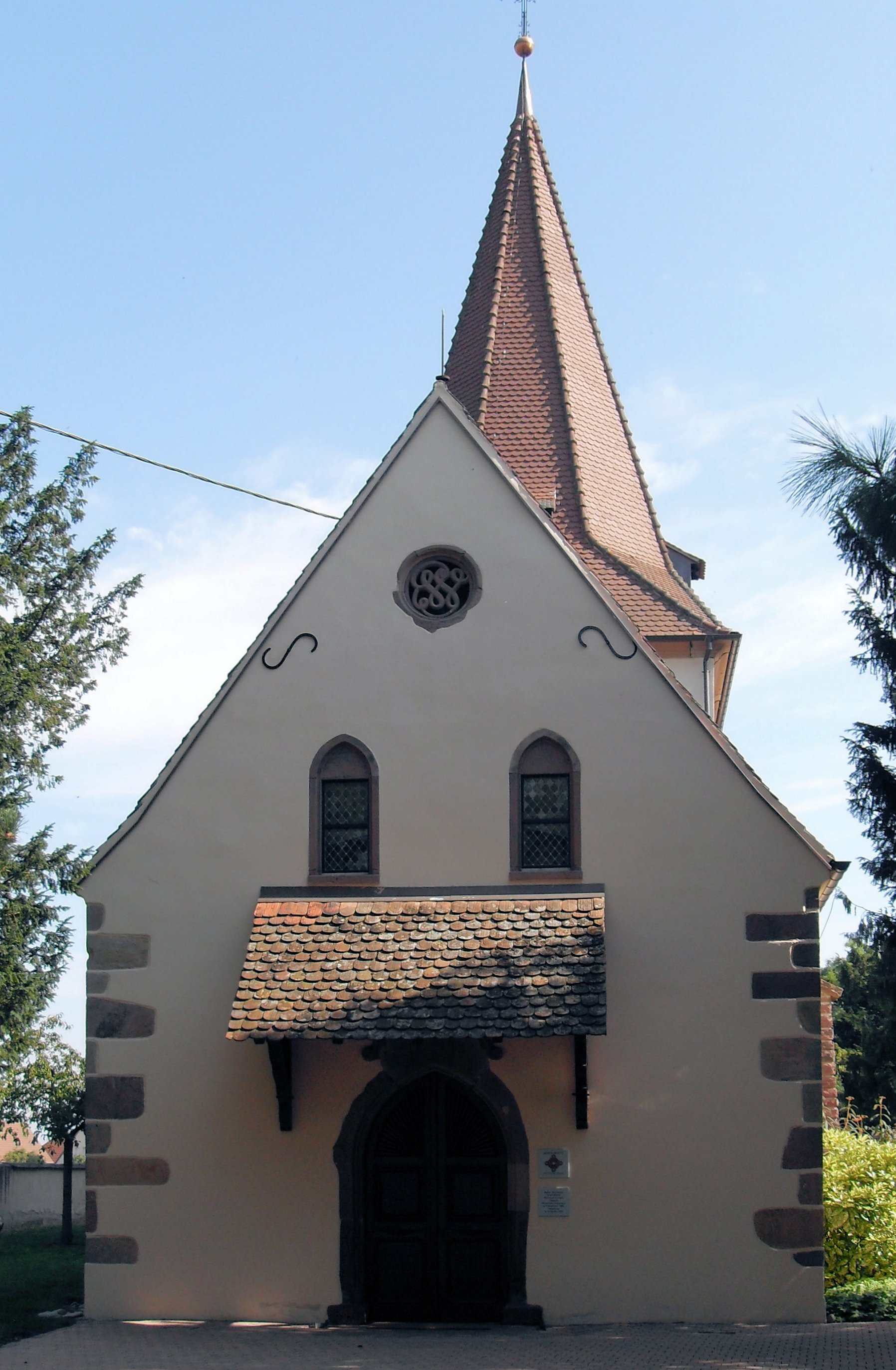
Saint-Michel in Wihr-en-Plaine

== Population ==
Population data refer to the area corresponding with the commune as of January 2025.

Historical population
Year	Pop.	±% p.a.
1968	2,057	—
1975	2,720	+4.07%
1982	4,209	+6.44%
1990	4,518	+0.89%
1999	5,060	+1.27%
2007	5,005	−0.14%
2012	5,243	+0.93%
2017	5,967	+2.62%
2023	6,199	+0.64%
Source: INSEE

== See also ==
- Communes of the Haut-Rhin département
