= Wickerschwihr =

Commune in Grand Est, France

- Commune
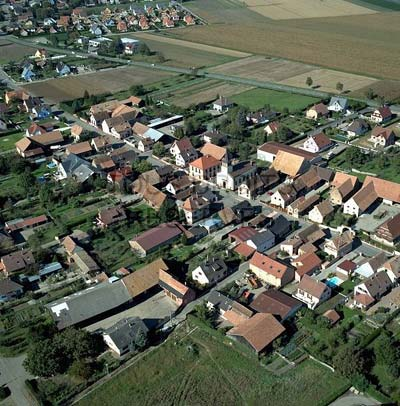
- An aerial view of Wickerschwihr

- Coat of arms
- Location of Wickerschwihr
- Location within France Location within Grand Est
- Coordinates: 48°06′29″N 7°26′13″E
- Country: France
- Region: Grand Est
- Department: Haut-Rhin
- Arrondissement: Colmar-Ribeauvillé
- Canton: Colmar-2
- Intercommunality: Colmar Agglomération

Government
  - Mayor (2020–2026): Richard Ley
- Area^{1}: 2.25 km^{2} (0.87 sq mi)
- Elevation: 183 m (600 ft)
- Highest elevation: 185 m (607 ft)
- Lowest elevation: 180 m (590 ft)
- Population (2023): 742
  - Density: 330/km^{2} (854/sq mi)
- Time zone: UTC+01:00 (CET)
  - Summer (DST): UTC+02:00 (CEST)
- INSEE/Postal code: 68366 /68320
- ^{1} French Land Register data, which excludes lakes, ponds, glaciers > 1 km^{2} (0.386 sq mi or 247 acres) and river estuaries.

Wickerschwihr (German: Wickerschweier) is a commune in the Haut-Rhin department in Grand Est in north-eastern France.

== Population ==
Historical population
Year	Pop.	±% p.a.
1968	211	—
1975	306	+5.45%
1982	395	+3.71%
1990	491	+2.76%
1999	610	+2.44%
2007	747	+2.56%
2012	772	+0.66%
2017	732	−1.06%
2023	742	+0.23%
Source: INSEE

== See also ==
- Communes of the Haut-Rhin department
