= Canton of Colmar-2 =

Coordinates: 48.07°N 7.36°E

The canton of Colmar-2 is an administrative division of the Haut-Rhin department, northeastern France. It was created at the French canton reorganisation which came into effect in March 2015. Its seat is in Colmar.

It consists of the following communes:

1. Andolsheim
2. Bischwihr
3. Colmar (partly)
4. Fortschwihr
5. Grussenheim
6. Horbourg-Wihr
7. Houssen
8. Jebsheim
9. Muntzenheim
10. Porte-du-Ried
11. Sainte-Croix-en-Plaine
12. Sundhoffen
13. Wickerschwihr
