= Bischwihr =

Commune in Grand Est, France

- Commune
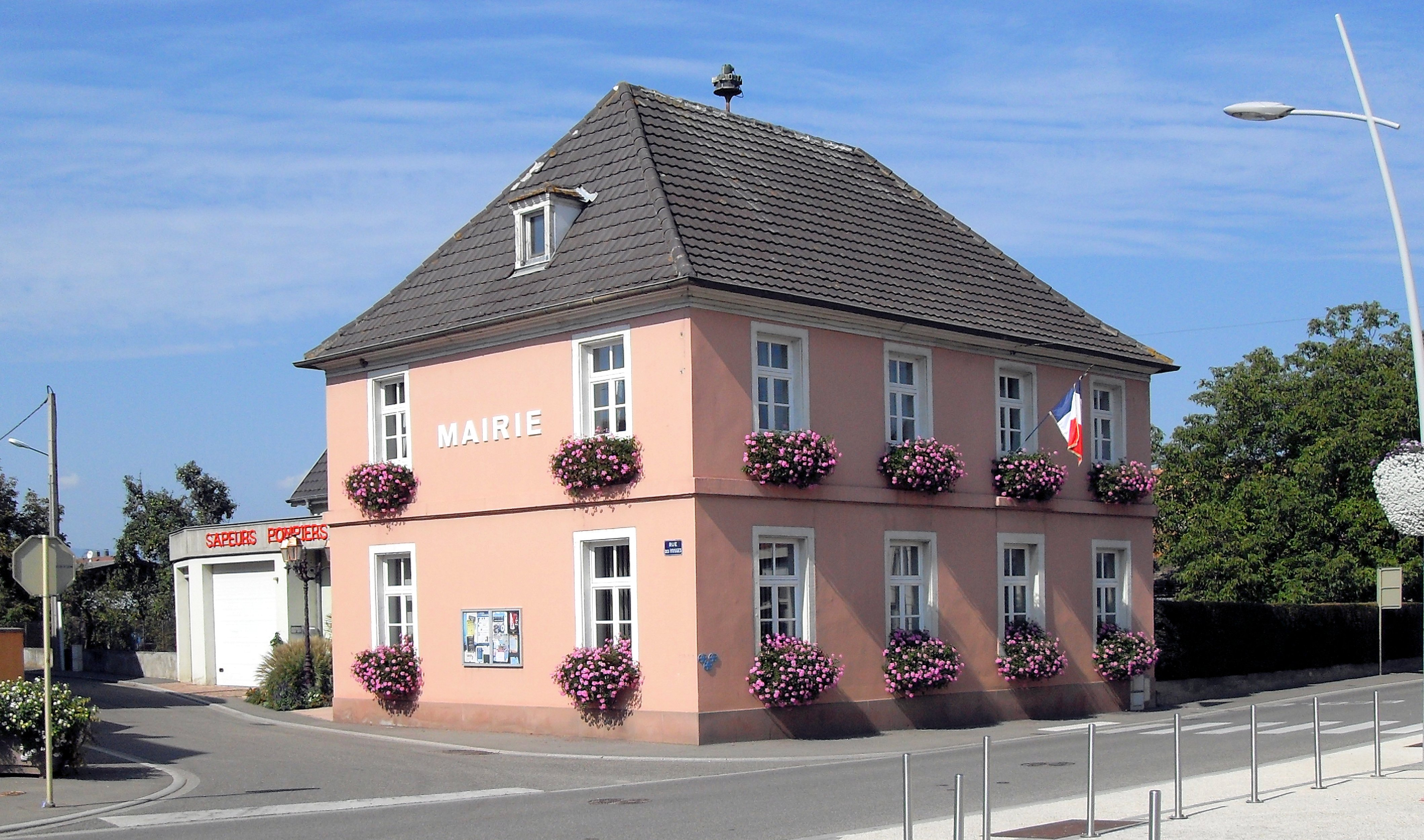
- The town hall in Bischwihr

- Coat of arms
- Location of Bischwihr
- Location within France Location within Grand Est
- Coordinates: 48°05′48″N 7°26′15″E
- Country: France
- Region: Grand Est
- Department: Haut-Rhin
- Arrondissement: Colmar-Ribeauvillé
- Canton: Colmar-2
- Intercommunality: Colmar Agglomération

Government
  - Mayor (2020–2026): Marie-Joseph Helmlinger
- Area^{1}: 3.23 km^{2} (1.25 sq mi)
- Elevation: 134 m (440 ft)
- Highest elevation: 187 m (614 ft)
- Lowest elevation: 182 m (597 ft)
- Population (2023): 1,202
  - Density: 372/km^{2} (964/sq mi)
- Time zone: UTC+01:00 (CET)
  - Summer (DST): UTC+02:00 (CEST)
- INSEE/Postal code: 68038 /68320
- ^{1} French Land Register data, which excludes lakes, ponds, glaciers > 1 km^{2} (0.386 sq mi or 247 acres) and river estuaries.

Bischwihr (French pronunciation: [biʃviʁ]; German: Bischweier) is a commune in the Haut-Rhin department in Grand Est in north-eastern France.

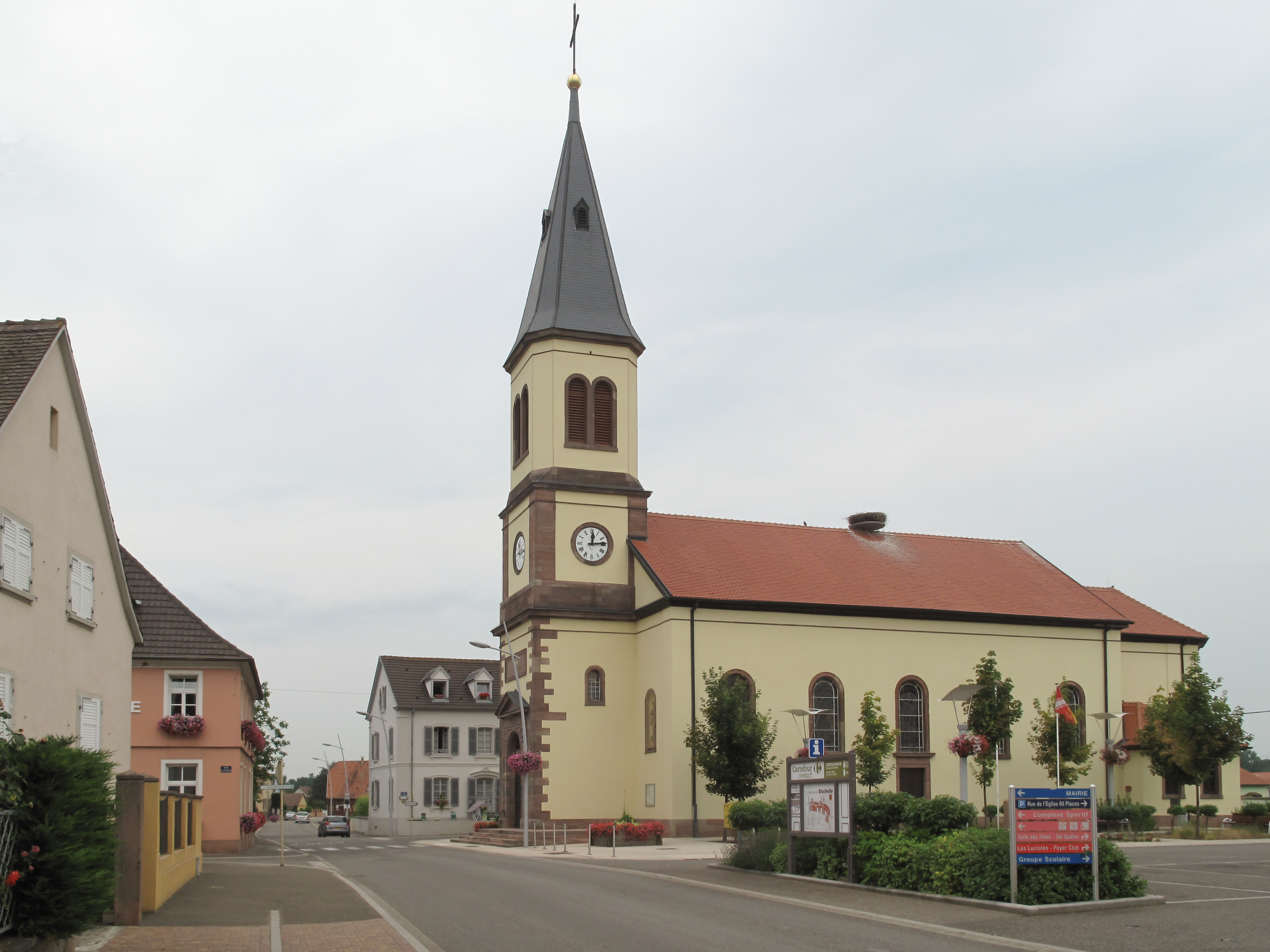
Bischwihr, church: l'église Saint-Joseph

== See also ==
- Communes of the Haut-Rhin department
