= Grussenheim =

Commune in Grand Est, France

Grussenheim Grüsse
- Commune
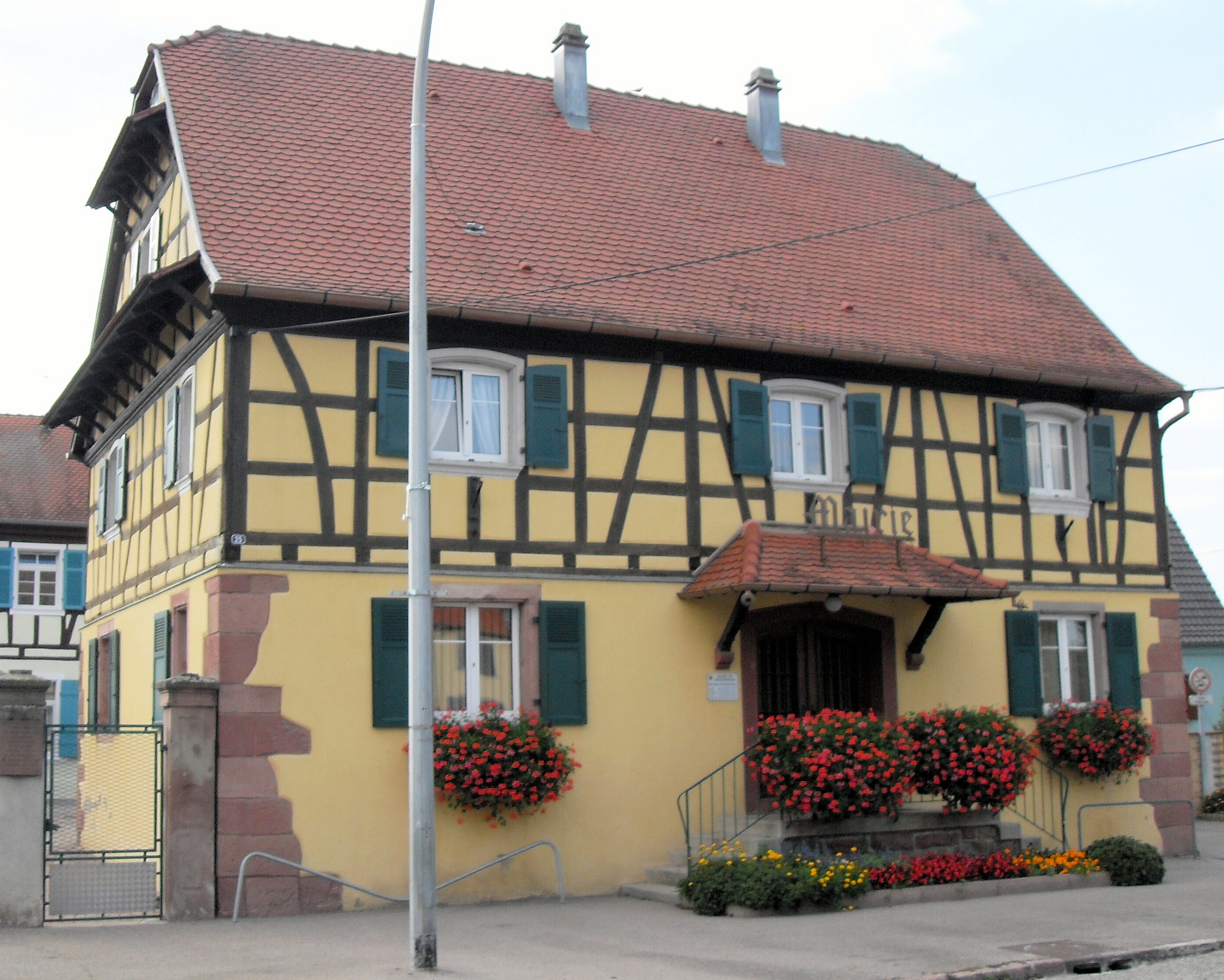
- The town hall in Grussenheim

- Coat of arms
- Location of Grussenheim
- Location within France Location within Grand Est
- Coordinates: 48°08′50″N 7°29′18″E
- Country: France
- Region: Grand Est
- Department: Haut-Rhin
- Arrondissement: Colmar-Ribeauvillé
- Canton: Colmar-2

Government
  - Mayor (2020–2026): Martin Klipfel
- Area^{1}: 7.53 km^{2} (2.91 sq mi)
- Elevation: 180 m (590 ft)
- Highest elevation: 185 m (607 ft)
- Lowest elevation: 176 m (577 ft)
- Population (2023): 805
  - Density: 107/km^{2} (277/sq mi)
- Time zone: UTC+01:00 (CET)
  - Summer (DST): UTC+02:00 (CEST)
- INSEE/Postal code: 68110 /68320
- ^{1} French Land Register data, which excludes lakes, ponds, glaciers > 1 km^{2} (0.386 sq mi or 247 acres) and river estuaries.

Grussenheim (French pronunciation: [ɡʁysənaim]; German: Grüssenheim) is a commune in the Haut-Rhin department in Grand Est in north-eastern France.

== See also ==
- Communes of the Haut-Rhin département
