= Benjamin Huin =

French politician (born 1992)

Member of the Senate
- Incumbent
- Assumed office 1 October 2026
- Constituency: Haut-Rhin

Personal details
- Born: 6 July 1992 (age 34)
- Party: Renaissance

Benjamin Huin-Morales (born 6 July 1992) is a French politician who was elected member of the Senate in 2026. He has served as mayor of Zimmerbach since 2021.
