= Zimmerbach =

Commune in Grand Est, France

- Commune
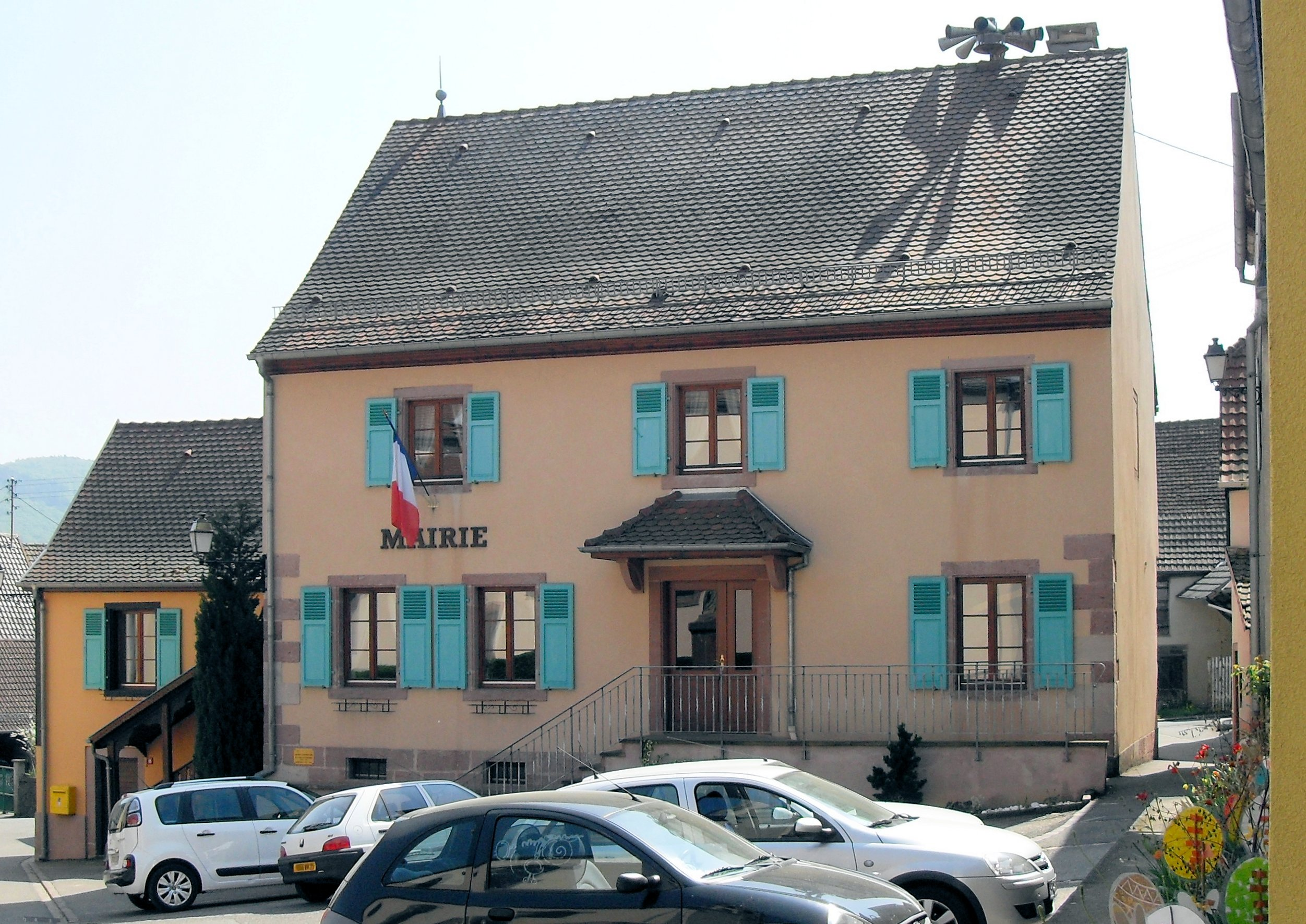
- The town hall in Zimmerbach

- Coat of arms
- Location of Zimmerbach
- Location within France Location within Grand Est
- Coordinates: 48°04′24″N 7°14′16″E
- Country: France
- Region: Grand Est
- Department: Haut-Rhin
- Arrondissement: Colmar-Ribeauvillé
- Canton: Wintzenheim
- Intercommunality: Colmar Agglomération

Government
  - Mayor (2021–2026): Benjamin Huin
- Area^{1}: 2.26 km^{2} (0.87 sq mi)
- Elevation: 300 m (980 ft)
- Highest elevation: 685 m (2,247 ft)
- Lowest elevation: 256 m (840 ft)
- Population (2023): 824
  - Density: 365/km^{2} (944/sq mi)
- Demonym(s): Zimmerbachois, Zimmerbachoises
- Time zone: UTC+01:00 (CET)
  - Summer (DST): UTC+02:00 (CEST)
- INSEE/Postal code: 68385 /68230
- ^{1} French Land Register data, which excludes lakes, ponds, glaciers > 1 km^{2} (0.386 sq mi or 247 acres) and river estuaries.

Zimmerbach is a commune in the Haut-Rhin department in Grand Est in north-eastern France.

== Population ==
Historical population

Year	Pop.	±% p.a.
1793	372	—
1821	406	+0.31%
1846	450	+0.41%
1871	426	−0.22%
1900	380	−0.39%
1926	400	+0.20%
1946	371	−0.38%
1962	379	+0.13%
1968	383	+0.18%

Year	Pop.	±% p.a.
1975	612	+6.92%
1982	652	+0.91%
1990	709	+1.05%
1999	857	+2.13%
2007	879	+0.32%
2012	877	−0.05%
2017	843	−0.79%
2023	824	−0.38%

Source: EHESS (1793–1999) and INSEE

== See also ==
- Communes of the Haut-Rhin department
