= Colmar Airport =

Airport in Houssen, France

Colmar - Houssen Airport Aéroport de Colmar - Houssen
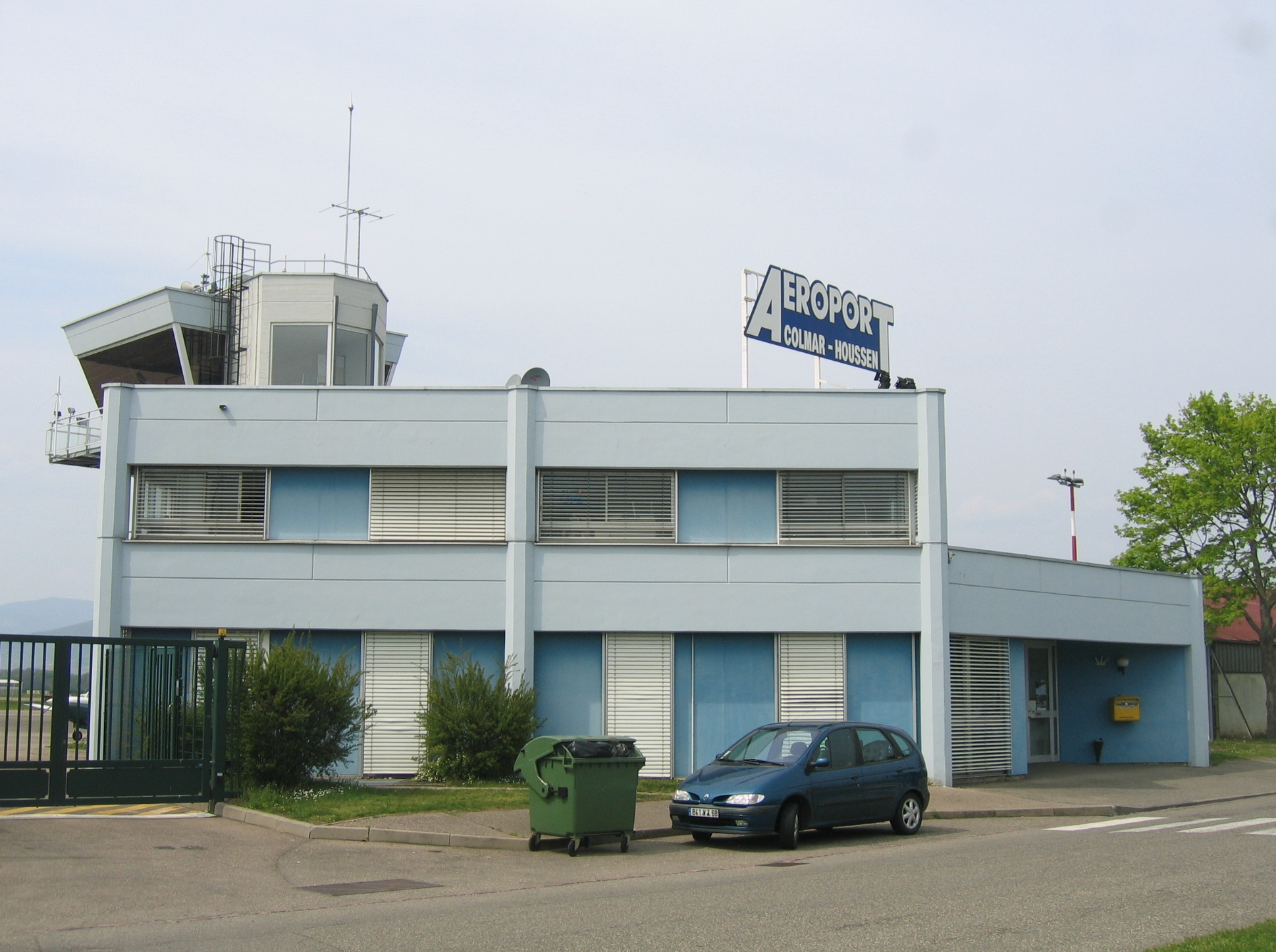
- IATA: CMR; ICAO: LFGA

Summary
- Airport type: Public
- Serves: Colmar, France
- Location: Houssen
- Elevation AMSL: 627 ft (191 m)
- Coordinates: 48°06′37″N 007°21′33″E

Map
- Location of airport in France

Runways
Direction	Length		Surface
Direction	m	ft	Surface
01/19	1,610	5,282	Paved
01L/19R	950	3,117	Grass
- Sources: French AIP, UAF

Colmar - Houssen Airport (French: Aéroport de Colmar - Houssen) (IATA: CMR, ICAO: LFGA) is an airport in Houssen, 1 km (1 mile) north of Colmar, both communes in the Haut-Rhin department of the Alsace region in France. The airport is along Autoroute A35 and is served by the Colmar Station.

== Facilities ==
The airport resides at an elevation of 627 feet (191 m) above mean sea level. It has one paved runway designated 01/19 which measures 1,610 by 30 metres (5,282 ft × 98 ft) and a parallel grass runway measuring 950 by 80 metres (3,117 ft × 262 ft).

== Bugatti Automobile Testing ==
Colmar Airport is used by the automobile company Bugatti to test all of their new W16 Mistral production cars, accelerating them to 186 miles per hour (299 km/h).
