= Colmar Agglomération =

- Communauté d'agglomération
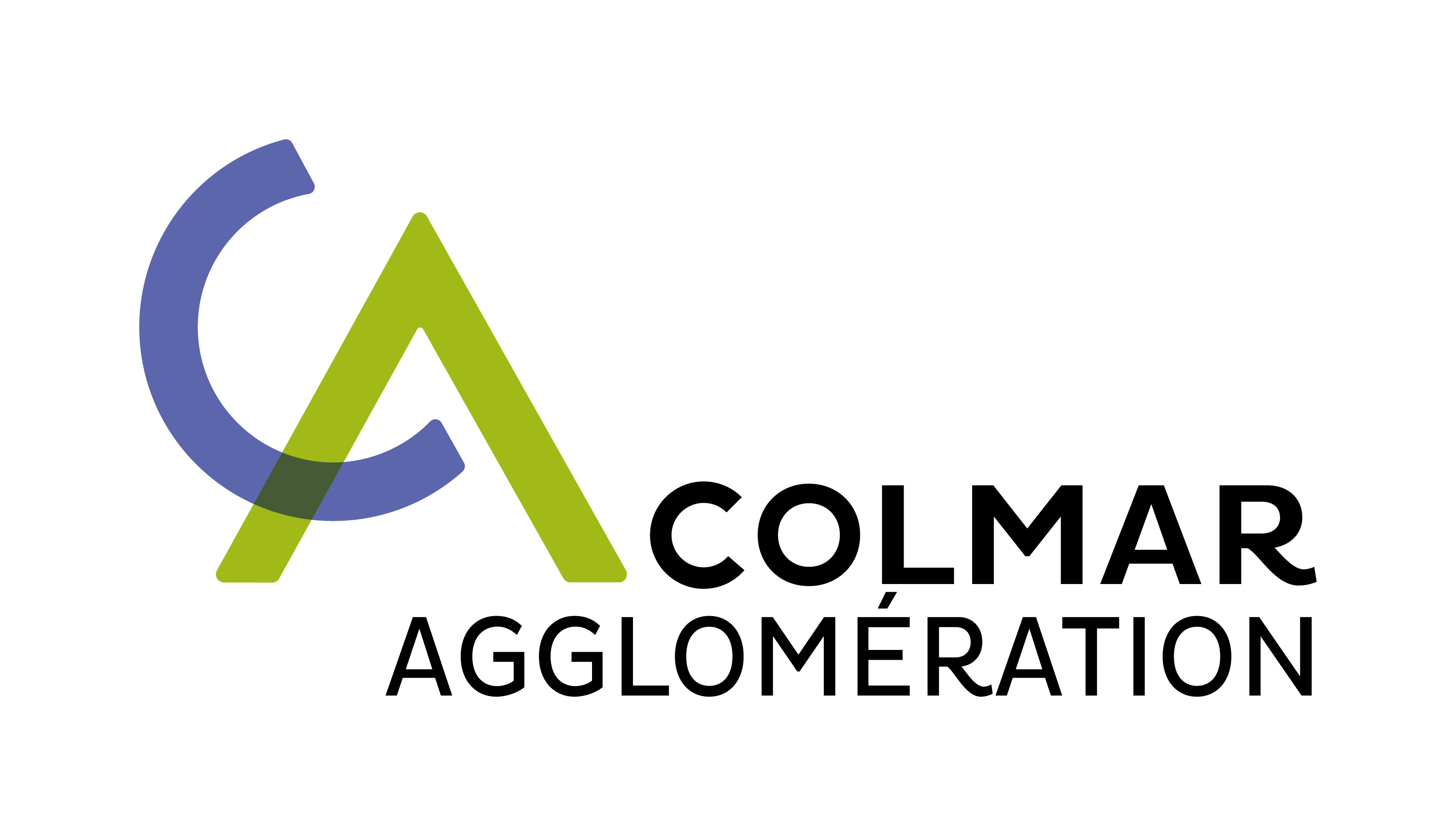
- Interactive map of Colmar Agglomération
- Coordinates: 48°05′N 07°21′E
- Country: France
- Region: Grand Est
- Department: Haut-Rhin
- No. of communes: {{{nbcomm}}}
- Established: 2003
- Area: 244.4 km^{2} (94.4 sq mi)
- Population (2017): 113,654
  - Density: 465.0/km^{2} (1,204/sq mi)
- Website: www.agglo-colmar.fr

Colmar Agglomération is the communauté d'agglomération, an intercommunal structure, centred on the city of Colmar. It is located in the Haut-Rhin department, in the Grand Est region, northeastern France. It was created in November 2003. Its seat is in Colmar. Its area is 244.4 km^{2}. Its population was 113,654 in 2017, of which 69,105 is in Colmar proper.

== Composition ==
The communauté d'agglomération consists of the following 20 communes:

1. Andolsheim
2. Bischwihr
3. Colmar
4. Fortschwihr
5. Herrlisheim-près-Colmar
6. Horbourg-Wihr
7. Houssen
8. Ingersheim
9. Jebsheim
10. Muntzenheim
11. Niedermorschwihr
12. Porte-du-Ried
13. Sainte-Croix-en-Plaine
14. Sundhoffen
15. Turckheim
16. Walbach
17. Wettolsheim
18. Wickerschwihr
19. Wintzenheim
20. Zimmerbach
