= Hôtel de Ville, Lingolsheim =

Town hall in Lingolsheim, France

Hôtel de Ville
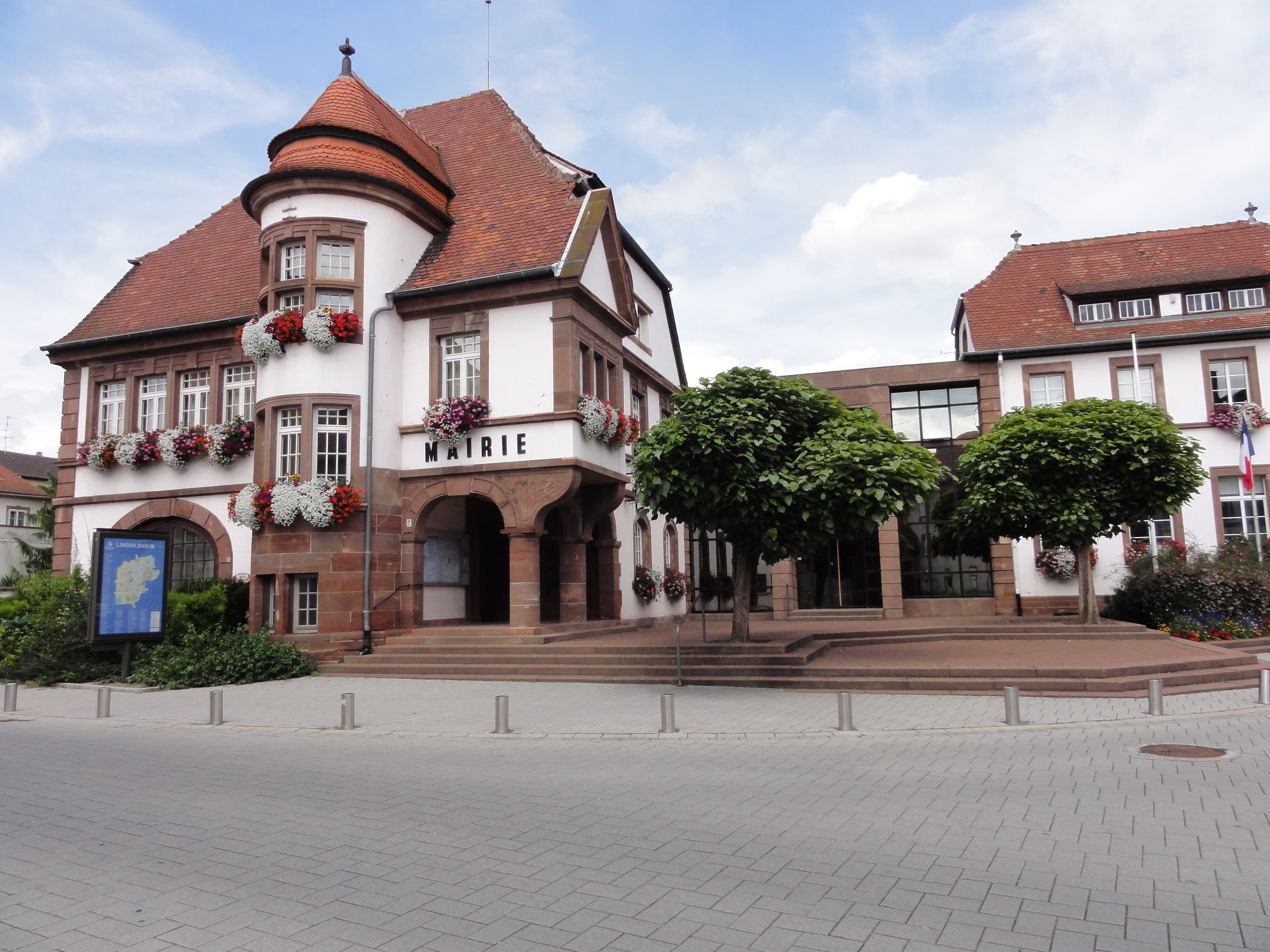
- The main frontage of the Hôtel de Ville in July 2011

General information
- Type: City hall
- Architectural style: Baroque Revival style
- Location: Lingolsheim, France
- Coordinates: 48.5558°N 7.6819°E
- Completed: 1907

Design and construction
- Architect: Gustave Oberthür

The Hôtel de Ville (French pronunciation: [otɛl də vil], City Hall) is a municipal building in Lingolsheim, Bas-Rhin, in northeastern France, standing on Rue du Château.

== History ==
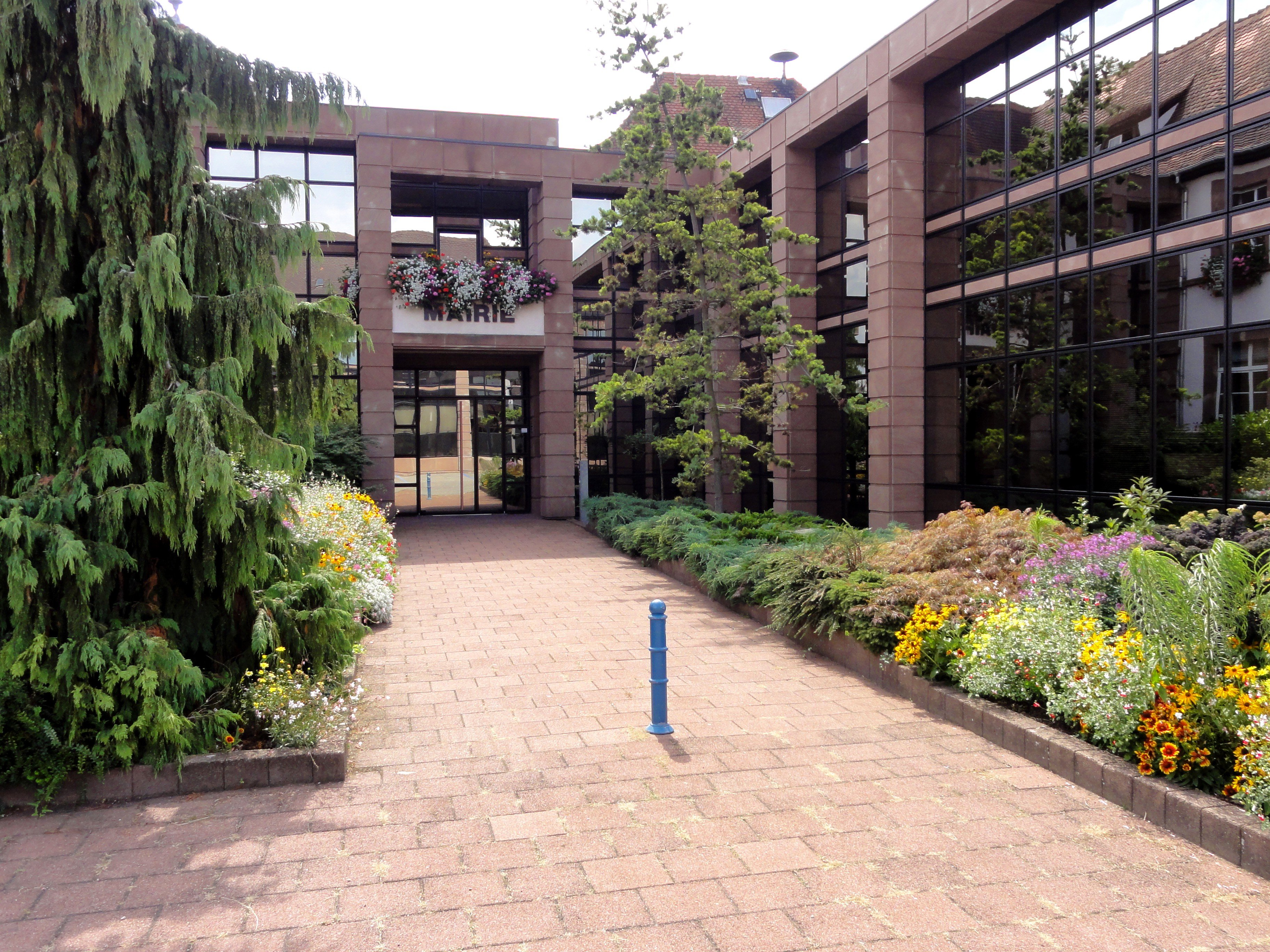
Entrance to the modern extension at the rear of the building

Following the French Revolution, the new town council initially met in the home of the mayor at the time. This arrangement continued until the mid-19th century when the council established a municipal office in a building on Rue des Dames. The old town hall was partially destroyed in a fire which took place on 11 February 1882, and then completely abandoned in 1908. In the early 20th century, following significant population growth largely associated with a local tannery, the council decided to commission a purpose-built town hall. The site they selected was on the northeastern side of Rue du Château. The new building was designed by Gustave Oberthür in the Baroque Revival style, built in pink sandstone with a cement render finish and was completed in 1907.

The design involved an asymmetrical main frontage of three bays facing onto the street. The central bay was formed by a three-stage semi-circular tower which was projected forward and surmounted by a steep roof and a finial. There were two small windows in the first stage, a mullioned bay window in the second stage and a mullioned and transomed bay window in the third stage. The left-hand bay was fenestrated by a Diocletian window on the ground floor, and by a four-part mullioned window on the first floor, while the right-hand bay featured a round-headed archway on the ground floor and a casement window on the first floor. Internally, the principal rooms were the Salle des Mariages (wedding room) and the Salle du Conseil (council chamber).

A war memorial, in the form of an obelisk with a laurel wreath intended to commemorate the lives of local service personnel who had died in the Franco-Prussian War and the First World War was created and installed in front of the former school building on the right of the town hall in the 1920s. An inscription was added to the memorial later to commemorate the lives of local people who died in the allied bombardment of the town which took place on 25 September 1944 during the Second World War.

In July 2019, environmental protestors from the group, "Action non-violente COP21", supported by Extinction Rebellion and the Yellow Vests, entered the town hall and walked out with a portrait of the president of France, Emmanuel Macron.
