= Lingolsheim =

Lingolsheim Língelse (Alsatian)
- Commune
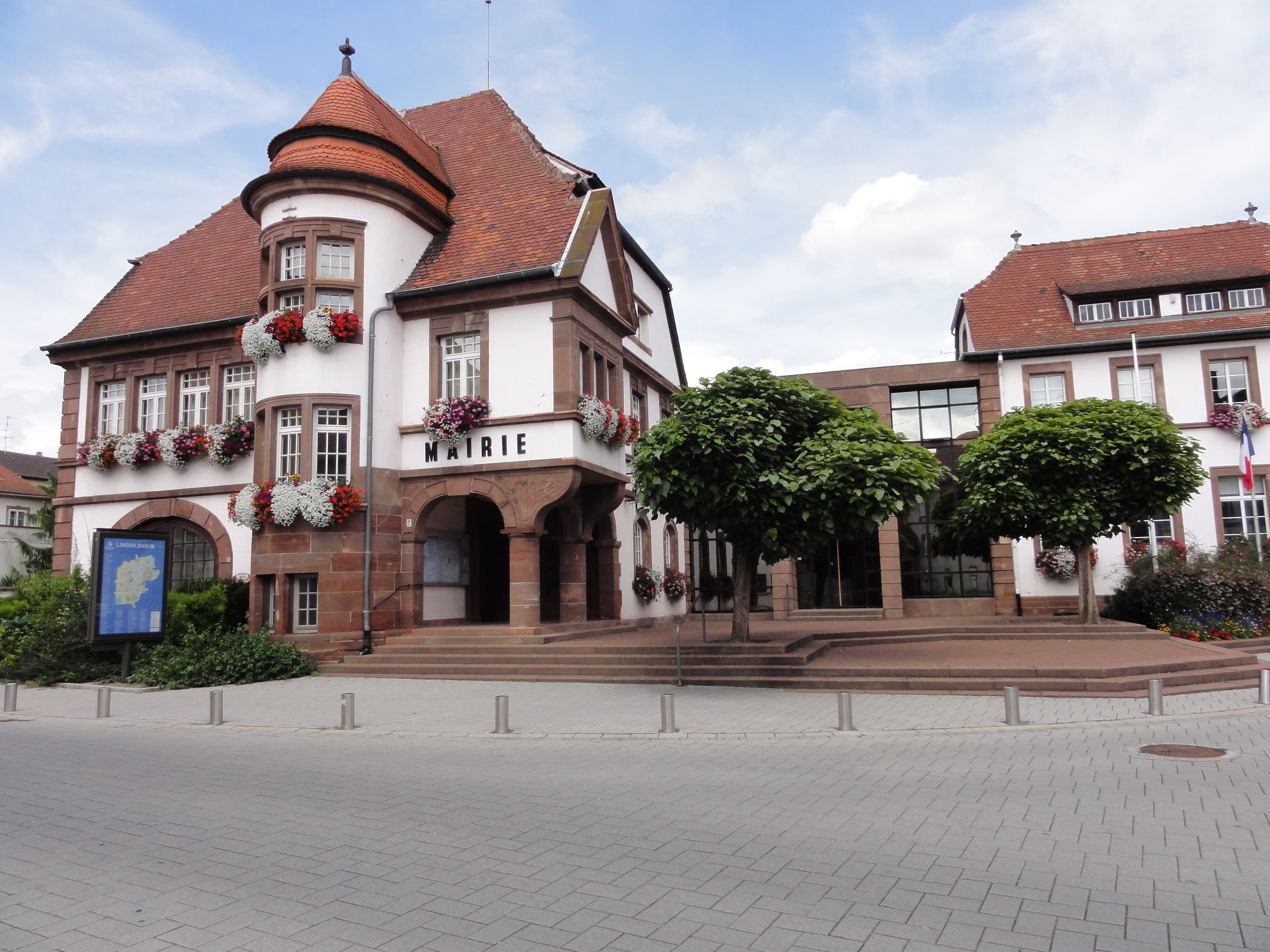
- The Hôtel de Ville

- Coat of arms
- Location of Lingolsheim
- Location within France Location within Grand Est
- Coordinates: 48°34′N 7°41′E
- Country: France
- Region: Grand Est
- Department: Bas-Rhin
- Arrondissement: Strasbourg
- Canton: Lingolsheim
- Intercommunality: Strasbourg Eurométropole

Government
  - Mayor (2020–2026): Catherine Graef-Eckert (LR)
- Area^{1}: 5.69 km^{2} (2.20 sq mi)
- Elevation: 140 m (460 ft)
- Highest elevation: 150 m (490 ft)
- Lowest elevation: 139 m (456 ft)
- Population (2023): 20,826
  - Density: 3,660/km^{2} (9,480/sq mi)
- Time zone: UTC+01:00 (CET)
  - Summer (DST): UTC+02:00 (CEST)
- INSEE/Postal code: 67267 /67380
- ^{1} French Land Register data, which excludes lakes, ponds, glaciers > 1 km^{2} (0.386 sq mi or 247 acres) and river estuaries.

Lingolsheim (French pronunciation: [liŋ(ɡ)ɔlsaim]) is a commune in the Bas-Rhin department in Grand Est in north-eastern France. The town lies near Strasbourg.

== Geography ==
Lingolsheim is situated southwest of Strasbourg, being a principal suburb between the city centre and Strasbourg Airport. Road access to the city is provided by departmental roads RD 392 and RD 222 and, less directly, by the region's main south-north autoroute. The commune is on the railway line that connects Strasbourg with Molsheim and Sélestat, and is served by Line B of the Strasbourg tram network as well as several bus routes.

It lies on the small rivers Bruche and Ill.

== History ==
=== Nineteenth-century industrialisation ===
Outcomes of the Franco-Prussian War included the annexation in 1871 of Alsace by Germany. A period of rapid modernisation ensued throughout the Strasbourg region, involving population growth, urbanisation and industrial expansion.

The Hôtel de Ville was completed in 1907.

For Lingolsheim, a defining feature of this modernisation was the creation and rapid development of a large industrial tannery by Adler & Oppenheimer Aktiengesellschaft. By 1914 the business employed 2,000 and leather dominated the town's economy.

These years also saw the establishment of a major sand extraction industry. The local soil, rich in red and white sands, was intensively exploited during the closing years of the nineteenth century.

=== Twentieth century wars ===
Lingolsheim was not much affected by the fighting in the First World War, but following the defeat of Germany the whole of Alsace found itself transferred back to France.

The Second World War was more damaging. Immediately before the German invasion of 1940, the town's tanneries were evacuated to Rennes where they remained until after the war. In the autumn of 1940 Lingolsheim was incorporated into "Großstraßburg". The buildings that had housed the tanneries were converted into a large workshop dedicated to repairing tanks. During this war Lingolsheim was subjected to several bombardments.

== Population ==
Historical population
Year	Pop.	±% p.a.
1968	8,287	—
1975	10,479	+3.41%
1982	14,688	+4.94%
1990	16,480	+1.45%
1999	16,860	+0.25%
2007	16,954	+0.07%
2012	16,941	−0.02%
2017	18,324	+1.58%
2023	20,826	+2.16%
Source: INSEE

== See also ==
- Communes of the Bas-Rhin department
