= Jebsheim =

Commune in Grand Est, France

- Commune
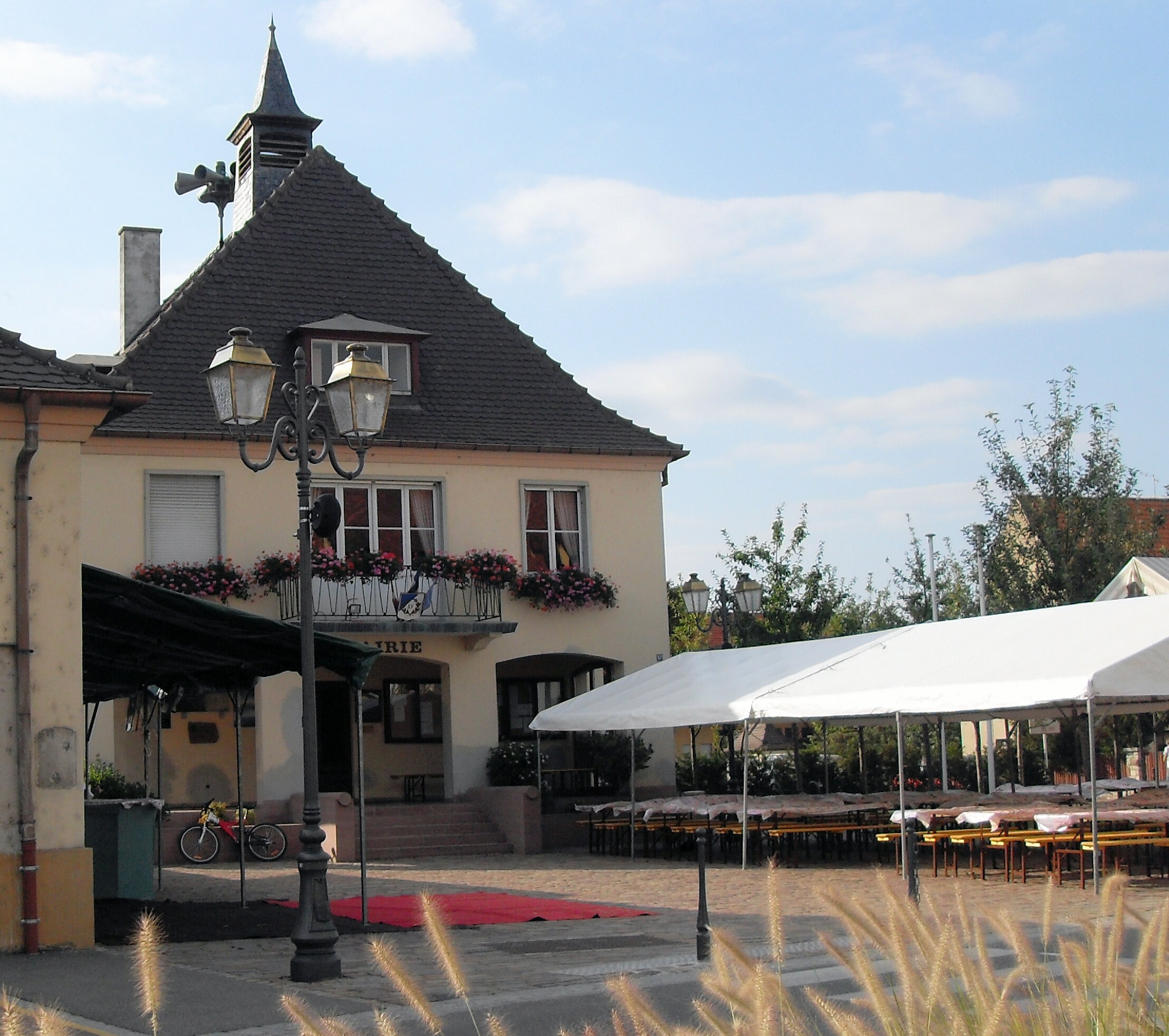
- The town hall in Jebsheim

- Coat of arms
- Location of Jebsheim
- Location within France Location within Grand Est
- Coordinates: 48°07′28″N 7°28′38″E
- Country: France
- Region: Grand Est
- Department: Haut-Rhin
- Arrondissement: Colmar-Ribeauvillé
- Canton: Colmar-2
- Intercommunality: Colmar Agglomération

Government
  - Mayor (2020–2026): Joël Henny
- Area^{1}: 14.85 km^{2} (5.73 sq mi)
- Elevation: 182 m (597 ft)
- Highest elevation: 186 m (610 ft)
- Lowest elevation: 177 m (581 ft)
- Population (2023): 1,360
  - Density: 91.6/km^{2} (237/sq mi)
- Time zone: UTC+01:00 (CET)
  - Summer (DST): UTC+02:00 (CEST)
- INSEE/Postal code: 68157 /68320
- ^{1} French Land Register data, which excludes lakes, ponds, glaciers > 1 km^{2} (0.386 sq mi or 247 acres) and river estuaries.

Jebsheim (French pronunciation: [ʒɛpsaim]; Alsatian: Iebse) is a commune in the Haut-Rhin department in Grand Est in north-eastern France.

During WWII while fighting over the Colmar Pocket, including Jebsheim, Audie Murphy was awarded the Medal of Honor.

== See also ==
- Communes of the Haut-Rhin département
- Colmar Pocket
