= Houssen =

Commune in Grand Est, France

- Commune
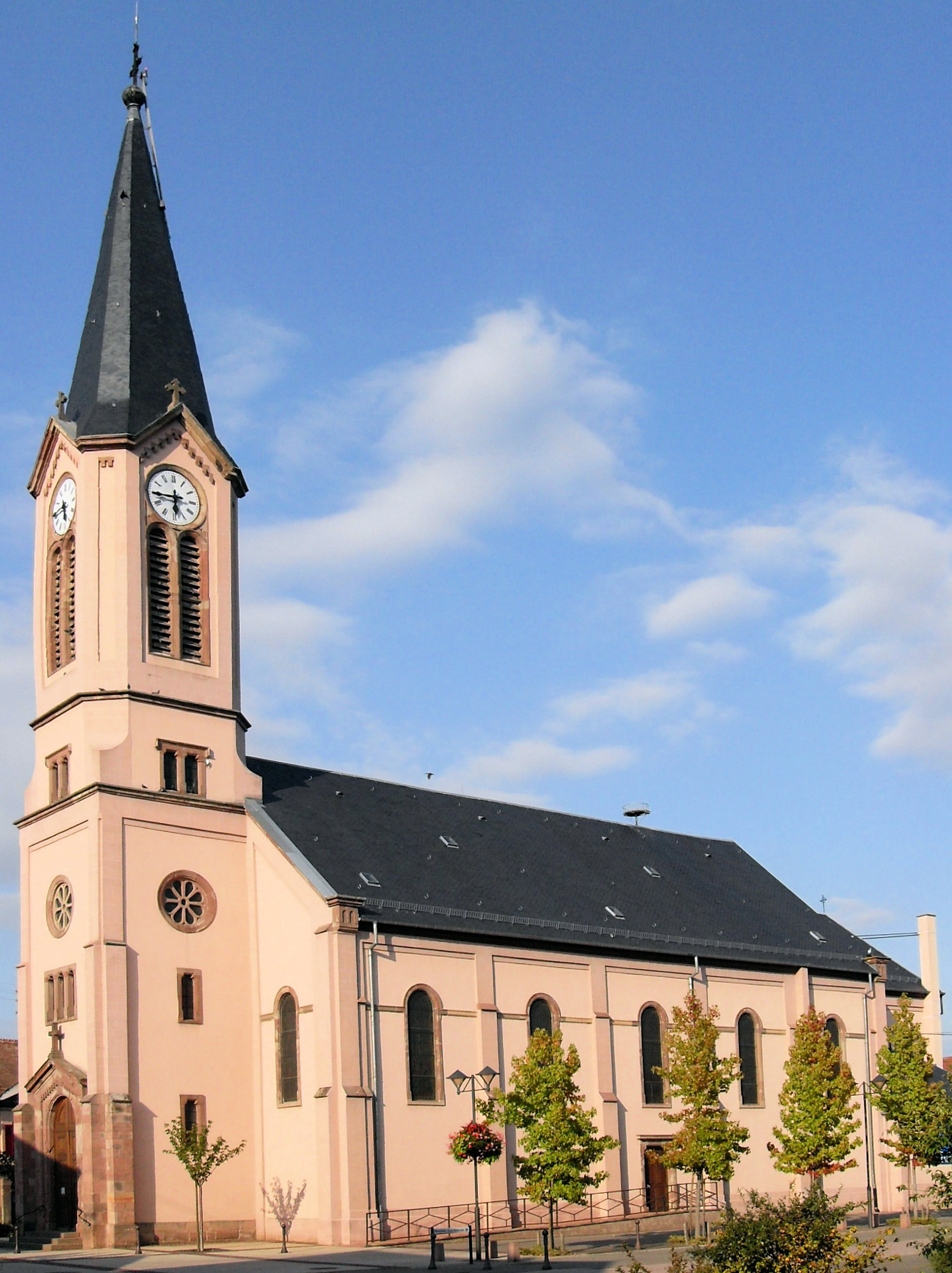
- The church in Houssen

- Coat of arms
- Location of Houssen
- Location within France Location within Grand Est
- Coordinates: 48°07′35″N 7°22′44″E
- Country: France
- Region: Grand Est
- Department: Haut-Rhin
- Arrondissement: Colmar-Ribeauvillé
- Canton: Colmar-2
- Intercommunality: Colmar Agglomération

Government
  - Mayor (2020–2026): Marie-Laure Stoffel
- Area^{1}: 6.7 km^{2} (2.6 sq mi)
- Elevation: 184 m (604 ft)
- Highest elevation: 190 m (620 ft)
- Lowest elevation: 177 m (581 ft)
- Population (2023): 2,323
  - Density: 350/km^{2} (900/sq mi)
- Time zone: UTC+01:00 (CET)
  - Summer (DST): UTC+02:00 (CEST)
- INSEE/Postal code: 68146 /68125
- ^{1} French Land Register data, which excludes lakes, ponds, glaciers > 1 km^{2} (0.386 sq mi or 247 acres) and river estuaries.

Houssen (French pronunciation: [usən]; German: Hausen; Alsatian: Hüse) is a commune in the Haut-Rhin department in Grand Est in north-eastern France. It is located near Colmar, the department capital and the Colmar Airport. It is near the border of Germany and thus has acquired many influences of the German culture including architecture, cuisine, and art.

== Population ==
Historical population
Year	Pop.	±% p.a.
1968	1,081	—
1975	1,094	+0.17%
1982	1,219	+1.56%
1990	1,348	+1.27%
1999	1,578	+1.77%
2007	1,652	+0.57%
2012	1,831	+2.08%
2017	2,249	+4.20%
2023	2,323	+0.54%
Source: INSEE

== See also ==
- Communes of the Haut-Rhin département
