= Sainte-Croix-en-Plaine =

Commune in Grand Est, France

- Commune
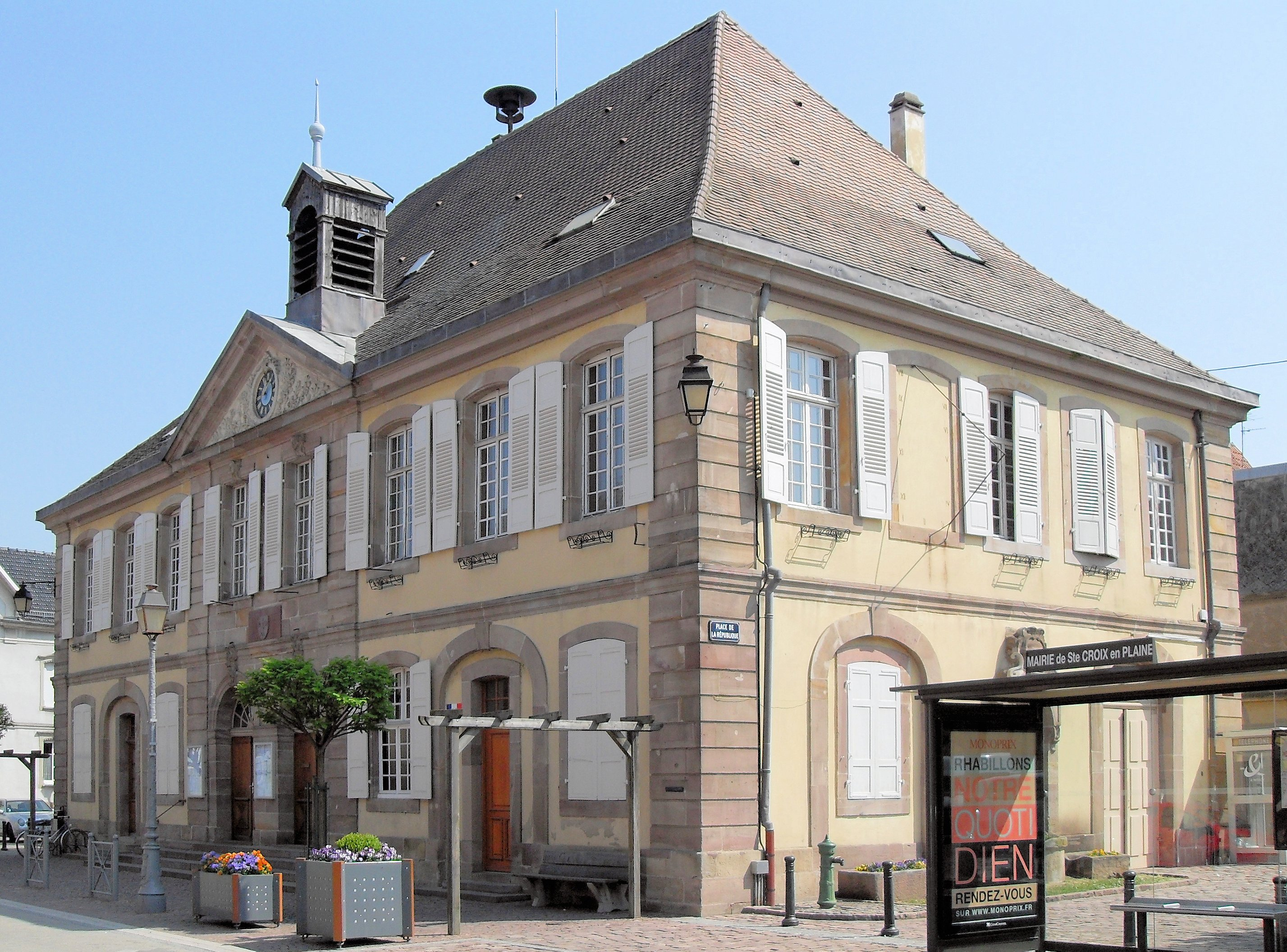
- The town hall in Sainte-Croix-en-Plaine

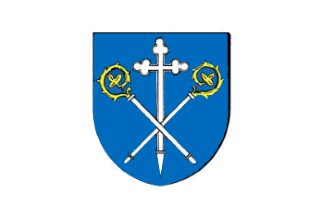
- Flag Coat of arms
- Location of Sainte-Croix-en-Plaine
- Location within France Location within Grand Est
- Coordinates: 48°00′33″N 7°23′08″E
- Country: France
- Region: Grand Est
- Department: Haut-Rhin
- Arrondissement: Colmar-Ribeauvillé
- Canton: Colmar-2
- Intercommunality: Colmar Agglomération

Government
  - Mayor (2020–2026): Mario Ackermann
- Area^{1}: 25.77 km^{2} (9.95 sq mi)
- Elevation: 196 m (643 ft)
- Highest elevation: 202 m (663 ft)
- Lowest elevation: 190 m (620 ft)
- Population (2023): 3,004
  - Density: 116.6/km^{2} (301.9/sq mi)
- Time zone: UTC+01:00 (CET)
  - Summer (DST): UTC+02:00 (CEST)
- INSEE/Postal code: 68295 /68127
- ^{1} French Land Register data, which excludes lakes, ponds, glaciers > 1 km^{2} (0.386 sq mi or 247 acres) and river estuaries.

Sainte-Croix-en-Plaine (French pronunciation: [sɛ̃t kʁwa ɑ̃ plɛn]; German: Heilig-Kreuz; Alsatian: Heilikriz) is a commune in the Haut-Rhin department in Grand Est in north-eastern France.

== Population ==
Historical population
Year	Pop.	±% p.a.
1968	1,502	—
1975	2,014	+4.28%
1982	1,933	−0.58%
1990	1,895	−0.25%
1999	2,121	+1.26%
2007	2,552	+2.34%
2012	2,794	+1.83%
2017	2,978	+1.28%
2023	3,004	+0.14%
Source: INSEE

== See also ==
- Communes of the Haut-Rhin department
