= Herrlisheim-près-Colmar =

Commune in Grand Est, France

- Commune
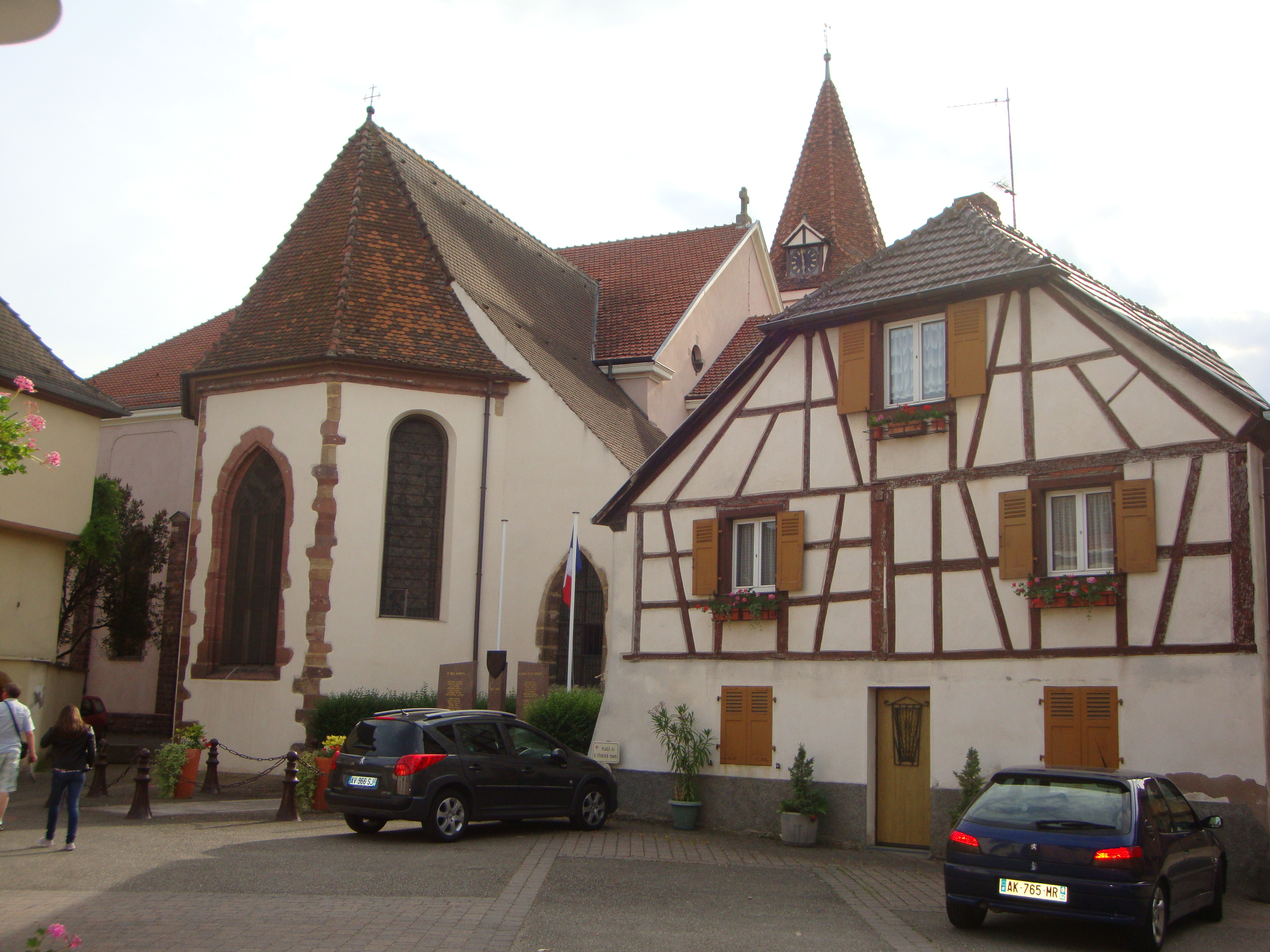
- The church in Herrlisheim-près-Colmar

- Coat of arms
- Location of Herrlisheim-près-Colmar
- Location within France Location within Grand Est
- Coordinates: 48°01′11″N 7°19′37″E
- Country: France
- Region: Grand Est
- Department: Haut-Rhin
- Arrondissement: Colmar-Ribeauvillé
- Canton: Wintzenheim
- Intercommunality: Colmar Agglomération

Government
  - Mayor (2020–2026): Laurent Winkelmuller
- Area^{1}: 7.68 km^{2} (2.97 sq mi)
- Elevation: 195 m (640 ft)
- Highest elevation: 293 m (961 ft)
- Lowest elevation: 192 m (630 ft)
- Population (2023): 1,911
  - Density: 249/km^{2} (644/sq mi)
- Time zone: UTC+01:00 (CET)
  - Summer (DST): UTC+02:00 (CEST)
- INSEE/Postal code: 68134 /68420
- ^{1} French Land Register data, which excludes lakes, ponds, glaciers > 1 km^{2} (0.386 sq mi or 247 acres) and river estuaries.

Herrlisheim-près-Colmar (French pronunciation: [ɛʁlisaim pʁɛ kɔlmaʁ], literally Herrlisheim near Colmar; German: Herrlisheim) is a commune in the Haut-Rhin department in Grand Est in north-eastern France.

== See also ==
- Communes of the Haut-Rhin département
