= Fortschwihr =

Commune in Grand Est, France

- Commune
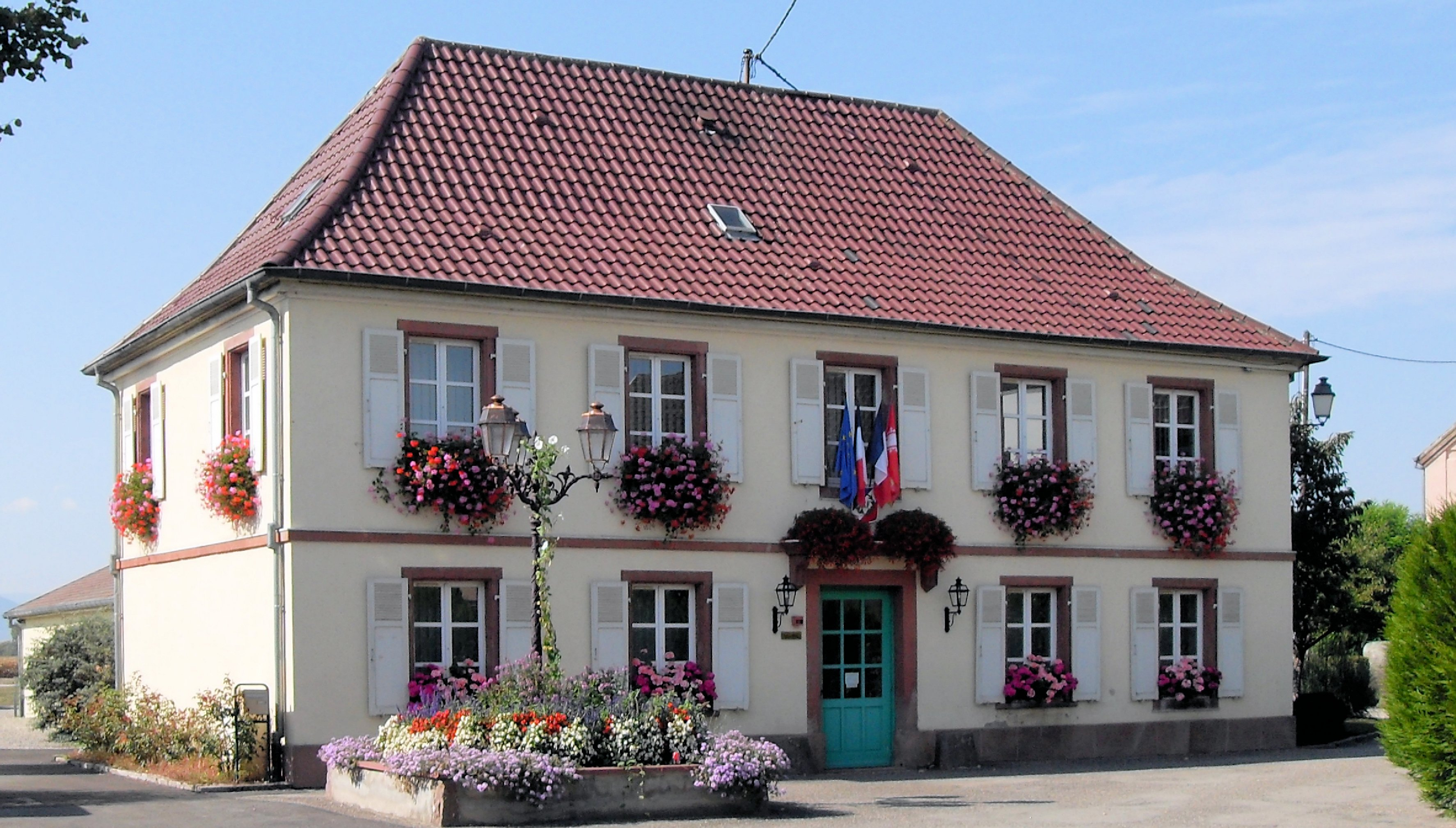
- The town hall in Fortschwihr

- Coat of arms
- Location of Fortschwihr
- Location within France Location within Grand Est
- Coordinates: 48°05′23″N 7°27′06″E
- Country: France
- Region: Grand Est
- Department: Haut-Rhin
- Arrondissement: Colmar-Ribeauvillé
- Canton: Colmar-2
- Intercommunality: Colmar Agglomération

Government
  - Mayor (2020–2026): Christian Voltz
- Area^{1}: 4.78 km^{2} (1.85 sq mi)
- Elevation: 185 m (607 ft)
- Highest elevation: 190 m (620 ft)
- Lowest elevation: 182 m (597 ft)
- Population (2023): 1,198
  - Density: 251/km^{2} (649/sq mi)
- Time zone: UTC+01:00 (CET)
  - Summer (DST): UTC+02:00 (CEST)
- INSEE/Postal code: 68095 /68320
- ^{1} French Land Register data, which excludes lakes, ponds, glaciers > 1 km^{2} (0.386 sq mi or 247 acres) and river estuaries.

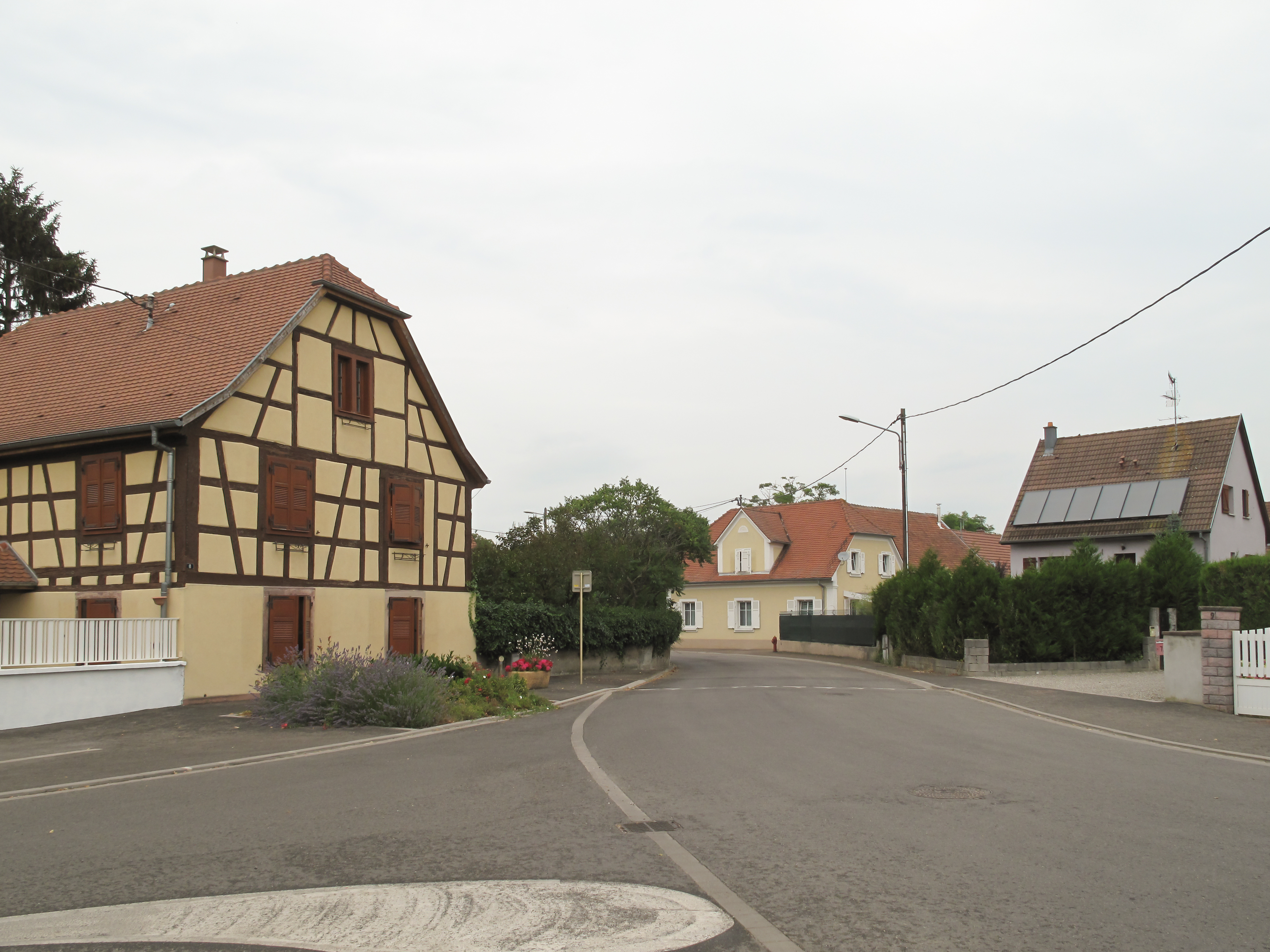
Fortschwihr, view to a street: Rue du Rhin

Fortschwihr (French: [fɔʁt͡ʃviʁ]; German: Fortschweier) is a commune in the Haut-Rhin department in Grand Est in north-eastern France.

== See also ==
- Communes of the Haut-Rhin département
