= Muntzenheim =

Commune in Grand Est, France

- Commune
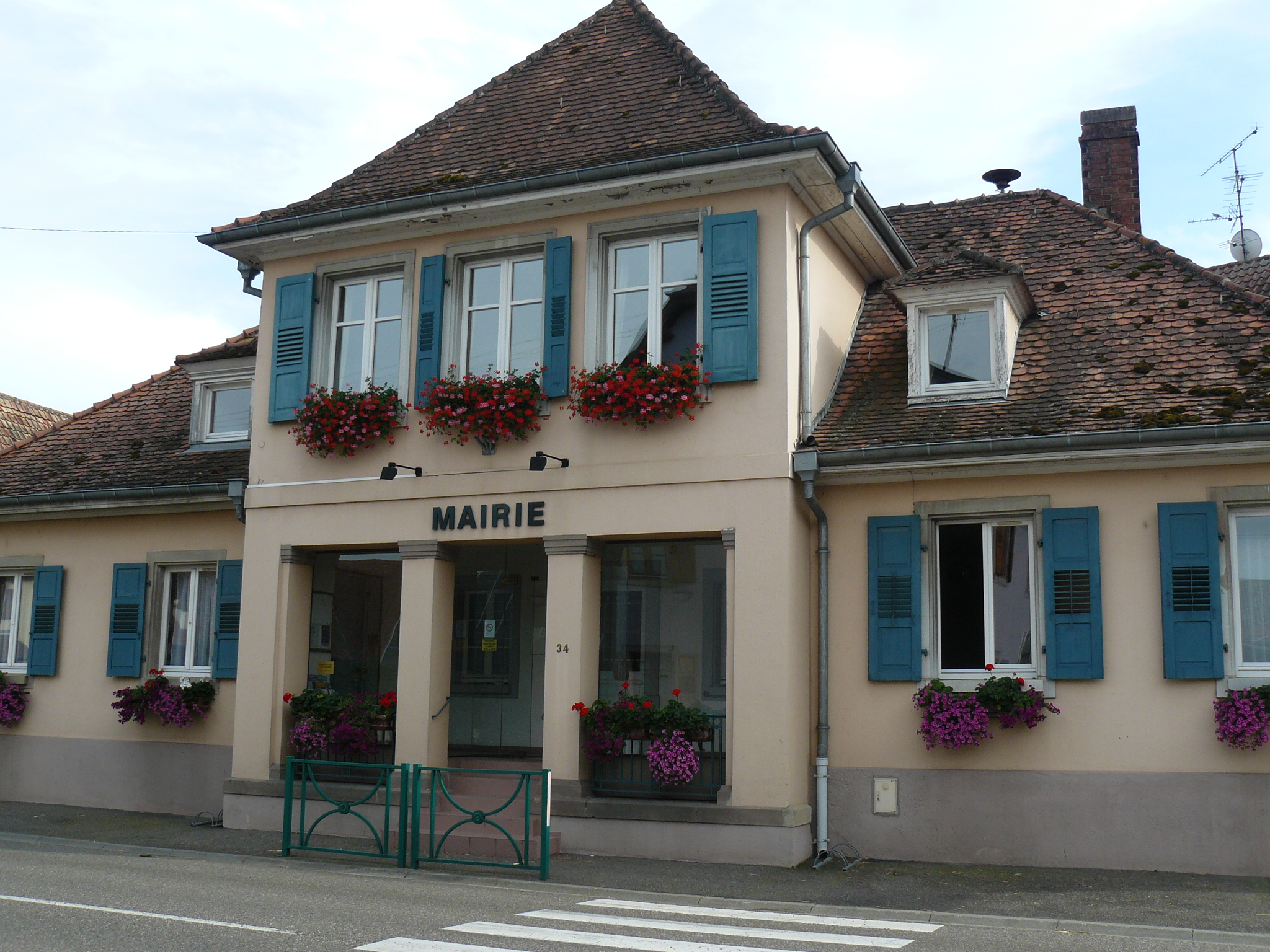
- The town hall in Muntzenheim

- Coat of arms
- Location of Muntzenheim
- Location within France Location within Grand Est
- Coordinates: 48°06′11″N 7°28′28″E
- Country: France
- Region: Grand Est
- Department: Haut-Rhin
- Arrondissement: Colmar-Ribeauvillé
- Canton: Colmar-2
- Intercommunality: Colmar Agglomération

Government
  - Mayor (2020–2026): Marc Bouche
- Area^{1}: 6.48 km^{2} (2.50 sq mi)
- Highest elevation: 187 m (614 ft)
- Lowest elevation: 181 m (594 ft)
- Population (2023): 1,288
  - Density: 199/km^{2} (515/sq mi)
- Time zone: UTC+01:00 (CET)
  - Summer (DST): UTC+02:00 (CEST)
- INSEE/Postal code: 68227 /68320
- ^{1} French Land Register data, which excludes lakes, ponds, glaciers > 1 km^{2} (0.386 sq mi or 247 acres) and river estuaries.

Muntzenheim (German: Munzenheim, German pronunciation: [ˈmʊntsənhaɪ̯m]; Alemannic German: Munze) is a commune in the Haut-Rhin department, Alsace, administrative region of Grand Est, France.

== See also ==
- Communes of the Haut-Rhin département
