= Andolsheim =

Commune in Grand Est, France

- Commune
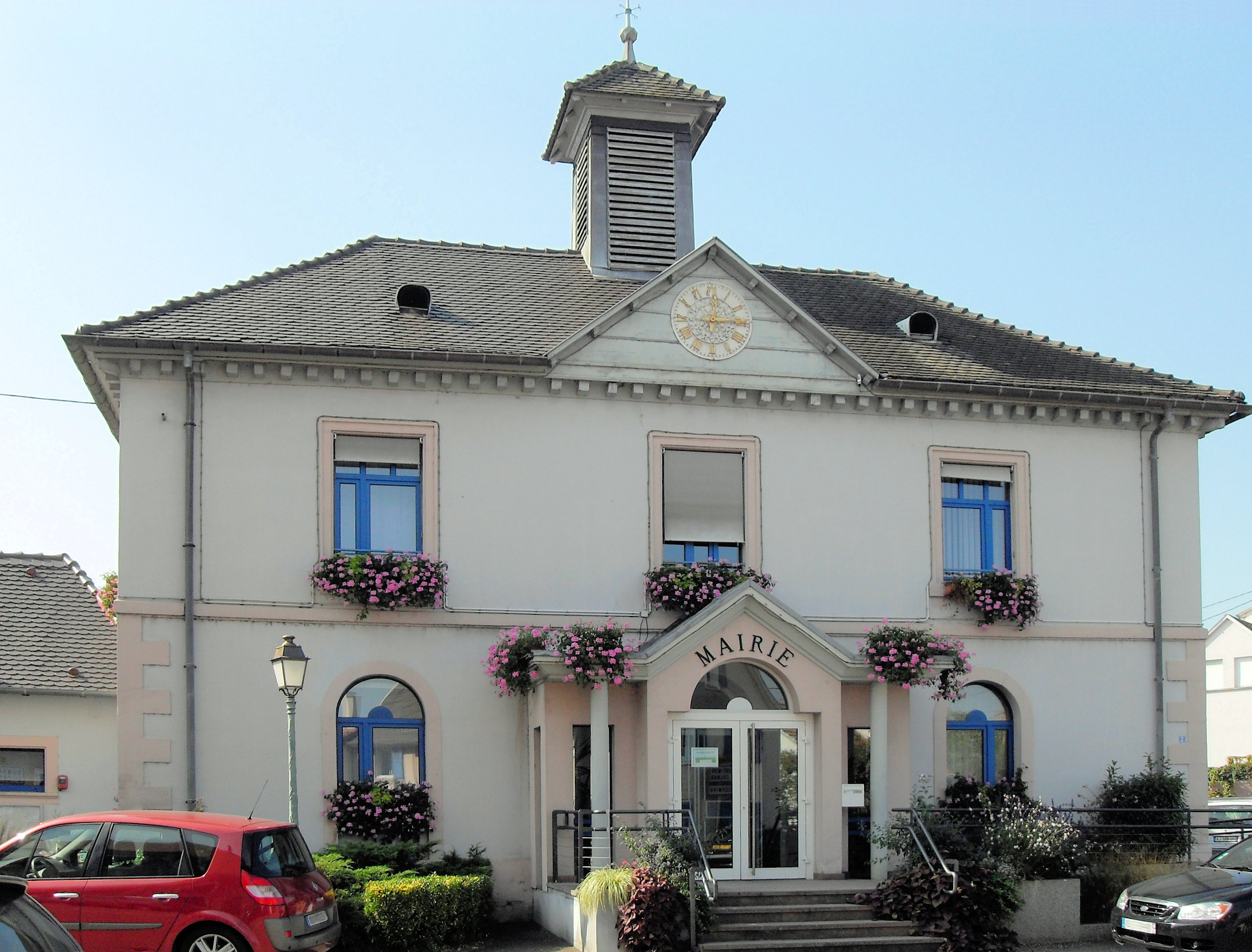
- The town hall in Andolsheim

- Coat of arms
- Location of Andolsheim
- Location within France Location within Grand Est
- Coordinates: 48°03′47″N 7°25′04″E
- Country: France
- Region: Grand Est
- Department: Haut-Rhin
- Arrondissement: Colmar-Ribeauvillé
- Canton: Colmar-2
- Intercommunality: Colmar Agglomération

Government
  - Mayor (2020–2026): Christian Rebert
- Area^{1}: 11.6 km^{2} (4.5 sq mi)
- Elevation: 189 m (620 ft)
- Highest elevation: 192 m (630 ft)
- Lowest elevation: 185 m (607 ft)
- Population (2023): 2,199
  - Density: 190/km^{2} (491/sq mi)
- Time zone: UTC+01:00 (CET)
  - Summer (DST): UTC+02:00 (CEST)
- INSEE/Postal code: 68007 /68280
- ^{1} French Land Register data, which excludes lakes, ponds, glaciers > 1 km^{2} (0.386 sq mi or 247 acres) and river estuaries.

Andolsheim (French pronunciation: [ɑ̃dɔlsaim]) is a commune in the Haut-Rhin department in Grand Est in north-eastern France.

== Population ==
Historical population
Year	Pop.	±% p.a.
1968	871	—
1975	1,088	+3.23%
1982	1,262	+2.14%
1990	1,565	+2.73%
1999	1,985	+2.68%
2007	2,227	+1.45%
2012	2,240	+0.12%
2017	2,162	−0.71%
2023	2,199	+0.28%
Source: INSEE

== See also ==
- Communes of the Haut-Rhin department
