= Sundhoffen =

Commune in Grand Est, France

- Commune
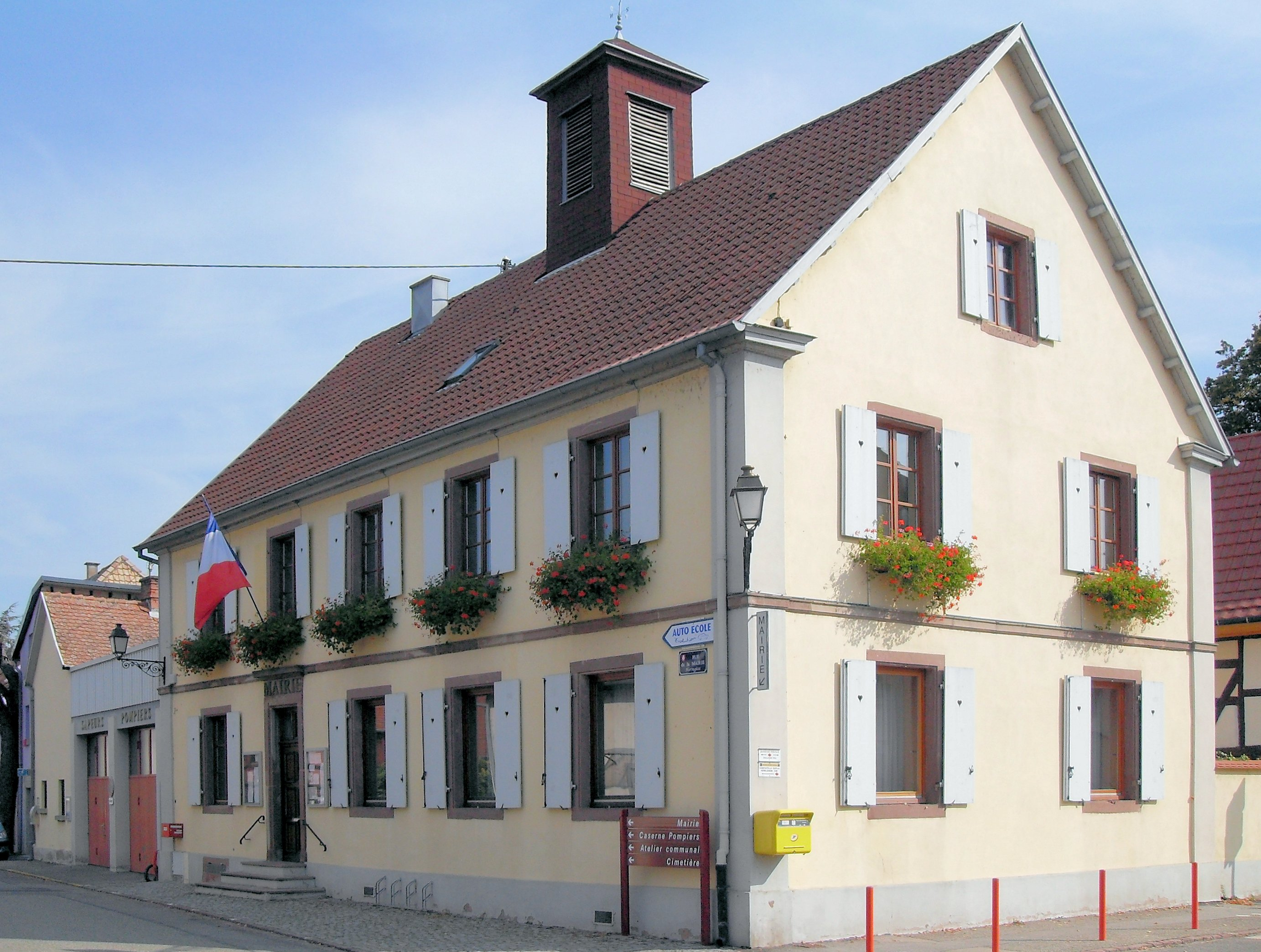
- The town hall in Sundhoffen

- Coat of arms
- Location of Sundhoffen
- Location within France Location within Grand Est
- Coordinates: 48°02′39″N 7°24′51″E
- Country: France
- Region: Grand Est
- Department: Haut-Rhin
- Arrondissement: Colmar-Ribeauvillé
- Canton: Colmar-2
- Intercommunality: Colmar Agglomération

Government
  - Mayor (2020–2026): Jean-Marc Schuller
- Area^{1}: 12.75 km^{2} (4.92 sq mi)
- Elevation: 193 m (633 ft)
- Highest elevation: 194 m (636 ft)
- Lowest elevation: 189 m (620 ft)
- Population (2023): 1,993
  - Density: 156.3/km^{2} (404.9/sq mi)
- Time zone: UTC+01:00 (CET)
  - Summer (DST): UTC+02:00 (CEST)
- INSEE/Postal code: 68331 /68280
- ^{1} French Land Register data, which excludes lakes, ponds, glaciers > 1 km^{2} (0.386 sq mi or 247 acres) and river estuaries.

Sundhoffen (German: Sundhofen) is a commune in the Haut-Rhin department in Grand Est in north-eastern France.

== See also ==
- Communes of the Haut-Rhin department
