= Arrondissement of Wissembourg =

Coordinates: 49.03°N 7.95°E

Wissembourg
- Former arrondissement
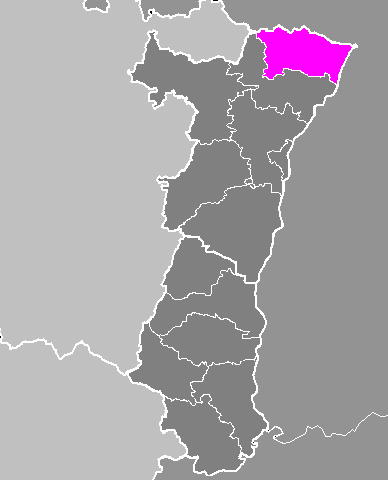
- Location within the former region Alsace
- Country: France
- Region: Grand Est
- Department: Bas-Rhin
- No. of communes: {{{nbcomm}}}
- Disbanded: 2015
- Area: 598 km^{2} (231 sq mi)
- Population (2012): 68,299
  - Density: 114/km^{2} (296/sq mi)

The arrondissement of Wissembourg is a former arrondissement of France in the Bas-Rhin department in the Alsace region. In 2015 it was merged into the new arrondissement of Haguenau-Wissembourg. It had 68 communes, and its population was 68,299 (2012).

== Composition ==
The communes of the arrondissement of Wissembourg, and their INSEE codes, were:

1. Aschbach (67012)	2. Beinheim (67025)	3. Betschdorf (67339)
4. Biblisheim (67037)	5. Buhl (67069)	6. Cleebourg (67074)
7. Climbach (67075)	8. Crœttwiller (67079)	9. Dieffenbach-lès-Wœrth (67093)
10. Drachenbronn-Birlenbach (67104)	11. Durrenbach (67110)	12. Eberbach-Seltz (67113)
13. Eschbach (67132)	14. Forstheim (67141)	15. Frœschwiller (67147)
16. Gœrsdorf (67160)	17. Gunstett (67177)	18. Hatten (67184)
19. Hegeney (67186)	20. Hoffen (67206)	21. Hunspach (67213)
22. Ingolsheim (67221)	23. Keffenach (67232)	24. Kesseldorf (67235)
25. Kutzenhausen (67254)	26. Lampertsloch (67257)	27. Langensoultzbach (67259)
28. Laubach (67260)	29. Lauterbourg (67261)	30. Lembach (67263)
31. Lobsann (67271)	32. Memmelshoffen (67288)	33. Merkwiller-Pechelbronn (67290)
34. Morsbronn-les-Bains (67303)	35. Mothern (67305)	36. Munchhausen (67308)
37. Neewiller-près-Lauterbourg (67315)	38. Niederlauterbach (67327)	39. Niederrœdern (67330)
40. Niedersteinbach (67334)	41. Oberdorf-Spachbach (67341)	42. Oberhoffen-lès-Wissembourg (67344)
43. Oberlauterbach (67346)	44. Oberrœdern (67349)	45. Obersteinbach (67353)
46. Preuschdorf (67379)	47. Retschwiller (67394)	48. Riedseltz (67400)
49. Rittershoffen (67404)	50. Rott (67416)	51. Salmbach (67432)
52. Schaffhouse-près-Seltz (67440)	53. Scheibenhard (67443)	54. Schleithal (67451)
55. Schœnenbourg (67455)	56. Seebach (67351)	57. Seltz (67463)
58. Siegen (67466)	59. Soultz-sous-Forêts (67474)	60. Steinseltz (67479)
61. Stundwiller (67484)	62. Surbourg (67487)	63. Trimbach (67494)
64. Walbourg (67511)	65. Wingen (67537)	66. Wintzenbach (67541)
67. Wissembourg (67544)	68. Wœrth (67550)	

== History ==
The arrondissement of Wissembourg was created in 1800, disbanded in 1871 (ceded to Germany) and restored in 1919. It was disbanded in 2015. As a result of the reorganisation of the cantons of France which came into effect in 2015, the borders of the cantons are no longer related to the borders of the arrondissements. The cantons of the arrondissement of Wissembourg were, as of January 2015:

1. Lauterbourg
2. Seltz
3. Soultz-sous-Forêts
4. Wissembourg
5. Wœrth
