= Ingolsheim =

Ingolsheim Íngelse
- Commune
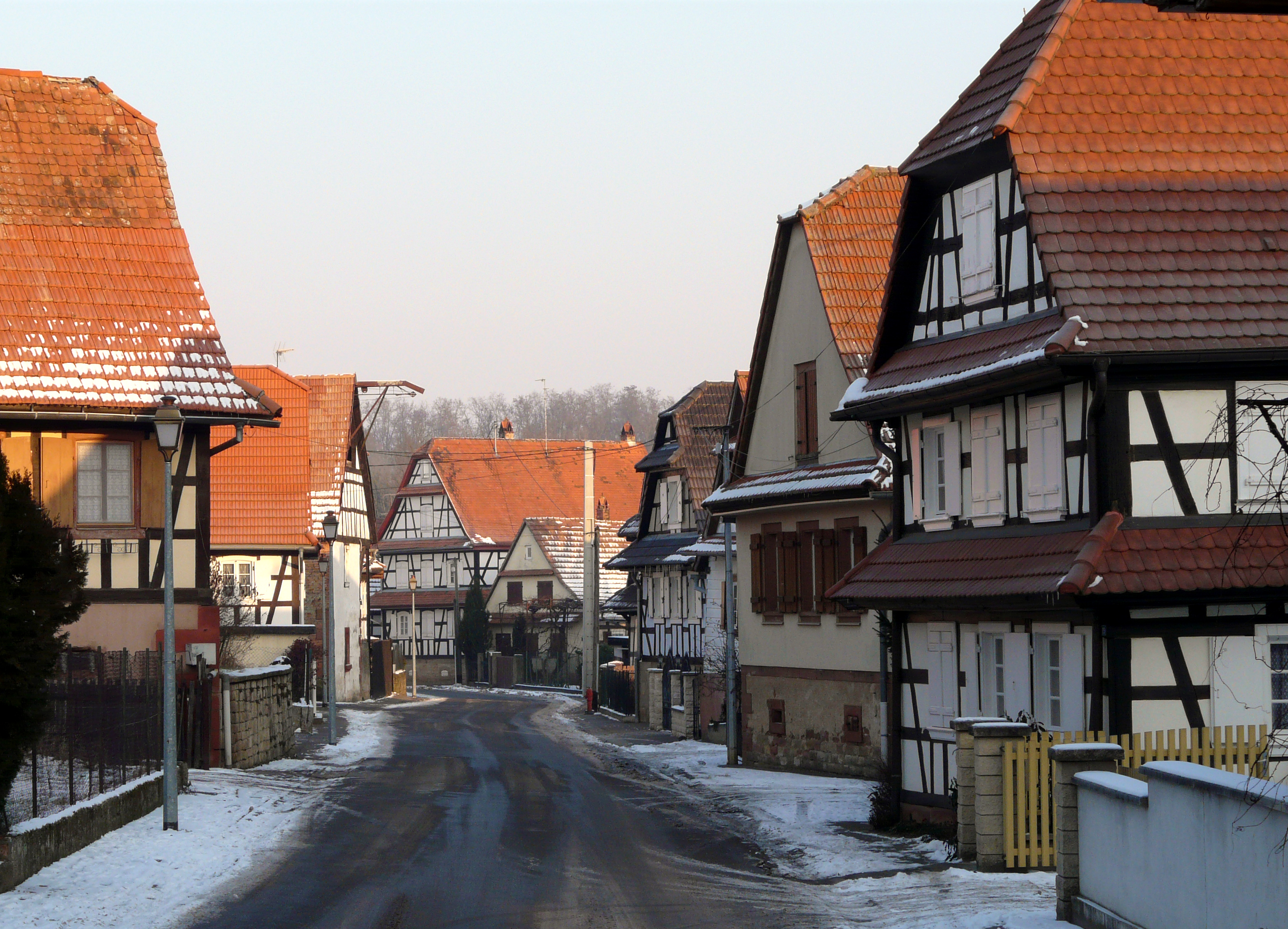
- Street in Ingolsheim

- Coat of arms
- Location of Ingolsheim
- Location within France Location within Grand Est
- Coordinates: 48°58′30″N 7°56′16″E
- Country: France
- Region: Grand Est
- Department: Bas-Rhin
- Arrondissement: Haguenau-Wissembourg
- Canton: Wissembourg

Government
  - Mayor (2020–2026): Richard Frey
- Area^{1}: 4.46 km^{2} (1.72 sq mi)
- Highest elevation: 205 m (673 ft)
- Lowest elevation: 146 m (479 ft)
- Population (2023): 353
  - Density: 79.1/km^{2} (205/sq mi)
- Time zone: UTC+01:00 (CET)
  - Summer (DST): UTC+02:00 (CEST)
- INSEE/Postal code: 67221 /67250
- ^{1} French Land Register data, which excludes lakes, ponds, glaciers > 1 km^{2} (0.386 sq mi or 247 acres) and river estuaries.

Ingolsheim (French pronunciation: [iŋ(ɡ)ɔlsaim]) is a commune in the north of the Bas-Rhin department in Grand Est in north-eastern France.

The commune is part of the Northern Vosges Regional Nature Park.

== Geography ==
Ingolsheim is a small village with an economy based on agriculture. During the second half of the twentieth century French agriculture became very much more mechanized than hitherto, and many villagers work in the surrounding towns.

The village is positioned between Soultz-sous-Forêts and Wissembourg. Adjacent communes are Cleebourg, Hunspach, Riedseltz and Seebach.

== History ==
The origins of Ingolsheim go back more than a thousand years. It appears as "Ingoldeshaha" in an imperial record of Otto II, from the year 967. The name mutated through various versions before becoming "Ingolsheim".

The reformation reached the village in 1558, and the parish was served by a shared church until the construction of a Catholic church in 1900.

The Second World War was rendered the more shocking for the villagers by the proximity of the Maginot Line, less than a kilometre away, and in particular the nearby Schoenenbourg fortifications. The village was one of many Alsatian communities located near the frontier to be evacuated to Haute-Vienne, in this case to the village of Bessines-sur-Gartempe.

== See also ==
- Communes of the Bas-Rhin department
- Ouvrage Schoenenbourg
