= Oberhoffen =

Oberhoffen may refer to one of two communes in the Bas-Rhin department in Alsace in north-eastern France:

- Oberhoffen-lès-Wissembourg
- Oberhoffen-sur-Moder
