= Arrondissement of Haguenau-Wissembourg =

Coordinates: 48.9°N 7.8°E

Haguenau-Wissembourg
- Arrondissement
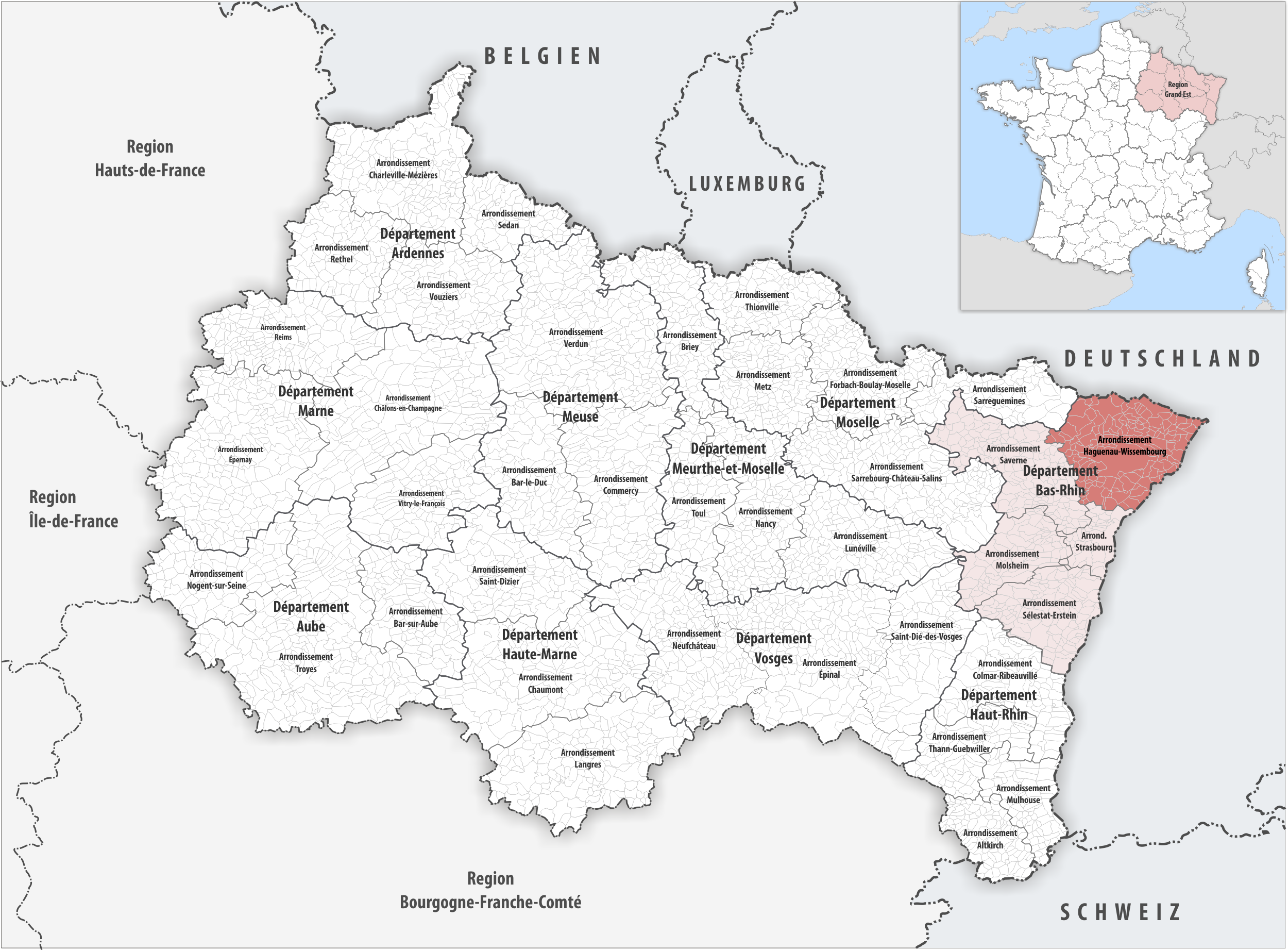
- Location within the region Grand Est
- Country: France
- Region: Grand Est
- Department: Bas-Rhin
- No. of communes: {{{nbcomm}}}
- Area: 1,424.6 km^{2} (550.0 sq mi)
- Population (2023): 246,078
  - Density: 172.73/km^{2} (447.38/sq mi)
- INSEE code: 672

The arrondissement of Haguenau-Wissembourg (French: Arrondissement de Haguenau-Wissembourg; Alsatian: Arrondissement Hàwenau-Waisseburch) is an arrondissement of France in the Bas-Rhin department in the Grand Est region. It has 141 communes. Its population is 244,304 (2021), and its area is 1,424.6 km^{2} (550.0 sq mi).

== Composition ==
The communes of the arrondissement of Haguenau-Wissembourg are:

1. Aschbach
2. Batzendorf
3. Beinheim
4. Bernolsheim
5. Berstheim
6. Betschdorf
7. Biblisheim
8. Bietlenheim
9. Bilwisheim
10. Bischwiller
11. Bitschhoffen
12. Brumath
13. Buhl
14. Cleebourg
15. Climbach
16. Crœttwiller
17. Dalhunden
18. Dambach
19. Dauendorf
20. Dieffenbach-lès-Wœrth
21. Donnenheim
22. Drachenbronn-Birlenbach
23. Drusenheim
24. Durrenbach
25. Eberbach-Seltz
26. Engwiller
27. Eschbach
28. Forstfeld
29. Forstheim
30. Fort-Louis
31. Frœschwiller
32. Gambsheim
33. Geudertheim
34. Gœrsdorf
35. Gries
36. Gumbrechtshoffen
37. Gundershoffen
38. Gunstett
39. Haguenau
40. Hatten
41. Hegeney
42. Herrlisheim
43. Hochstett
44. Hœrdt
45. Hoffen
46. Hunspach
47. Huttendorf
48. Ingolsheim
49. Kaltenhouse
50. Kauffenheim
51. Keffenach
52. Kesseldorf
53. Kilstett
54. Kindwiller
55. Krautwiller
56. Kriegsheim
57. Kurtzenhouse
58. Kutzenhausen
59. Lampertsloch
60. Langensoultzbach
61. Laubach
62. Lauterbourg
63. Lembach
64. Leutenheim
65. Lobsann
66. Memmelshoffen
67. Merkwiller-Pechelbronn
68. Mertzwiller
69. Mietesheim
70. Mittelschaeffolsheim
71. Mommenheim
72. Morsbronn-les-Bains
73. Morschwiller
74. Mothern
75. Munchhausen
76. Neewiller-près-Lauterbourg
77. Neuhaeusel
78. Niederbronn-les-Bains
79. Niederlauterbach
80. Niedermodern
81. Niederrœdern
82. Niederschaeffolsheim
83. Niedersteinbach
84. Oberbronn
85. Oberdorf-Spachbach
86. Oberhoffen-lès-Wissembourg
87. Oberhoffen-sur-Moder
88. Oberlauterbach
89. Oberrœdern
90. Obersteinbach
91. Offendorf
92. Offwiller
93. Ohlungen
94. Olwisheim
95. Preuschdorf
96. Reichshoffen
97. Retschwiller
98. Riedseltz
99. Rittershoffen
100. Rœschwoog
101. Rohrwiller
102. Roppenheim
103. Rothbach
104. Rott
105. Rottelsheim
106. Rountzenheim-Auenheim
107. Salmbach
108. Schaffhouse-près-Seltz
109. Scheibenhard
110. Schirrhein
111. Schirrhoffen
112. Schleithal
113. Schœnenbourg
114. Schweighouse-sur-Moder
115. Seebach
116. Seltz
117. Sessenheim
118. Siegen
119. Soufflenheim
120. Soultz-sous-Forêts
121. Stattmatten
122. Steinseltz
123. Stundwiller
124. Surbourg
125. Trimbach
126. Uhlwiller
127. Uhrwiller
128. Uttenhoffen
129. Val-de-Moder
130. Wahlenheim
131. Walbourg
132. Weitbruch
133. Weyersheim
134. Windstein
135. Wingen
136. Wintershouse
137. Wintzenbach
138. Wissembourg
139. Wittersheim
140. Wœrth
141. Zinswiller

== History ==
The arrondissement of Haguenau-Wissembourg was created in January 2015 by the merger of the former arrondissements of Haguenau and Wissembourg. At the same time, it absorbed two communes from the arrondissement of Saverne and 18 communes from the former arrondissement of Strasbourg-Campagne.
