= Buhl, Bas-Rhin =

Buhl Bihl
- Commune
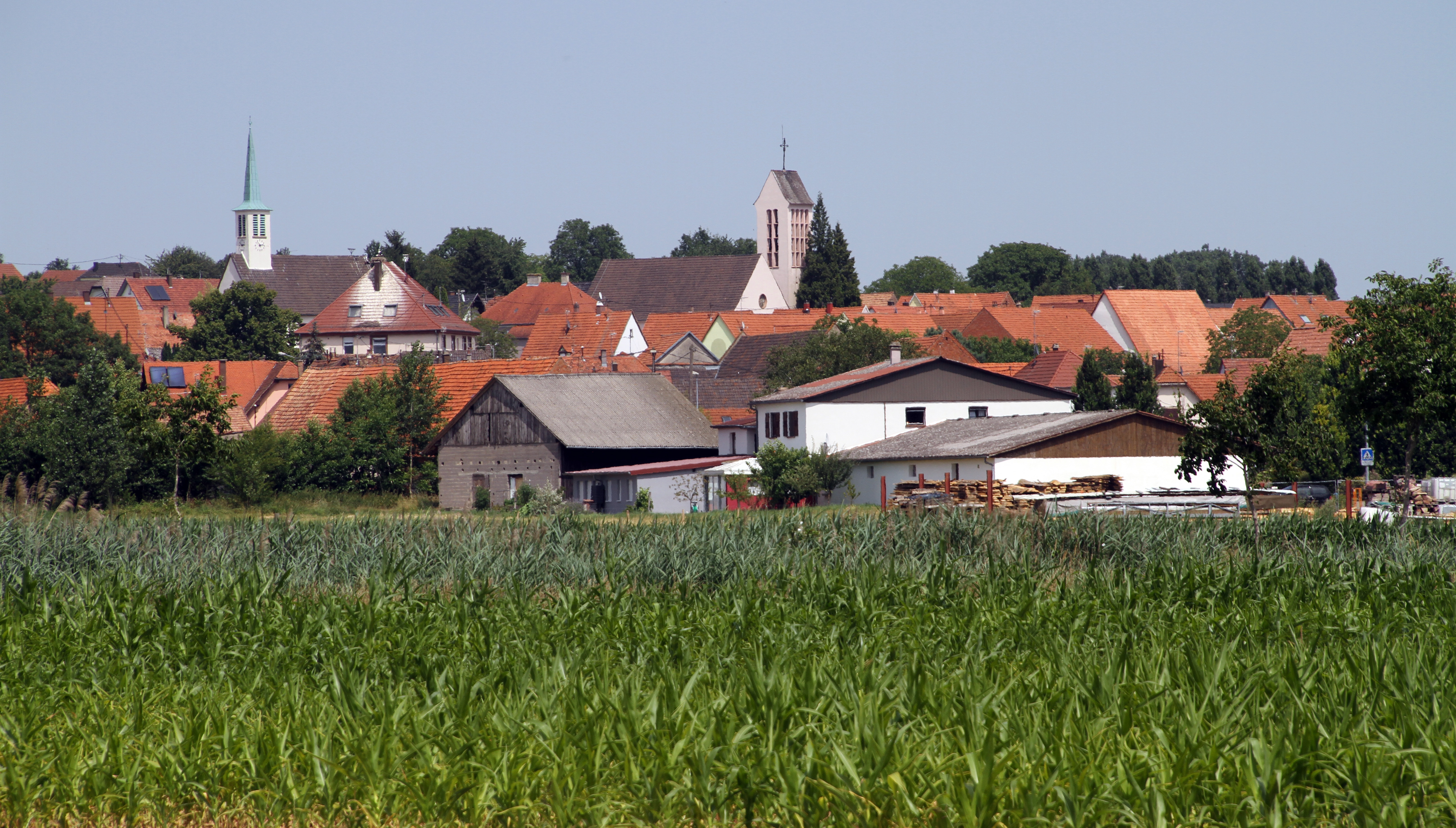
- A general view of Buhl

- Coat of arms
- Location of Buhl
- Location within France Location within Grand Est
- Coordinates: 48°55′04″N 8°00′27″E
- Country: France
- Region: Grand Est
- Department: Bas-Rhin
- Arrondissement: Haguenau-Wissembourg
- Canton: Wissembourg

Government
  - Mayor (2020–2026): Sylvie Pouillard
- Area^{1}: 4.4 km^{2} (1.7 sq mi)
- Highest elevation: 178 m (584 ft)
- Lowest elevation: 125 m (410 ft)
- Population (2023): 506
  - Density: 120/km^{2} (300/sq mi)
- Time zone: UTC+01:00 (CET)
  - Summer (DST): UTC+02:00 (CEST)
- INSEE/Postal code: 67069 /67470
- ^{1} French Land Register data, which excludes lakes, ponds, glaciers > 1 km^{2} (0.386 sq mi or 247 acres) and river estuaries.

Buhl (French pronunciation: [byl]; German: Bühl) is a commune in the Bas-Rhin department in Grand Est in north-eastern France.

== See also ==
- Communes of the Bas-Rhin department
