= Trimbach, Bas-Rhin =

Trimbach
- Commune
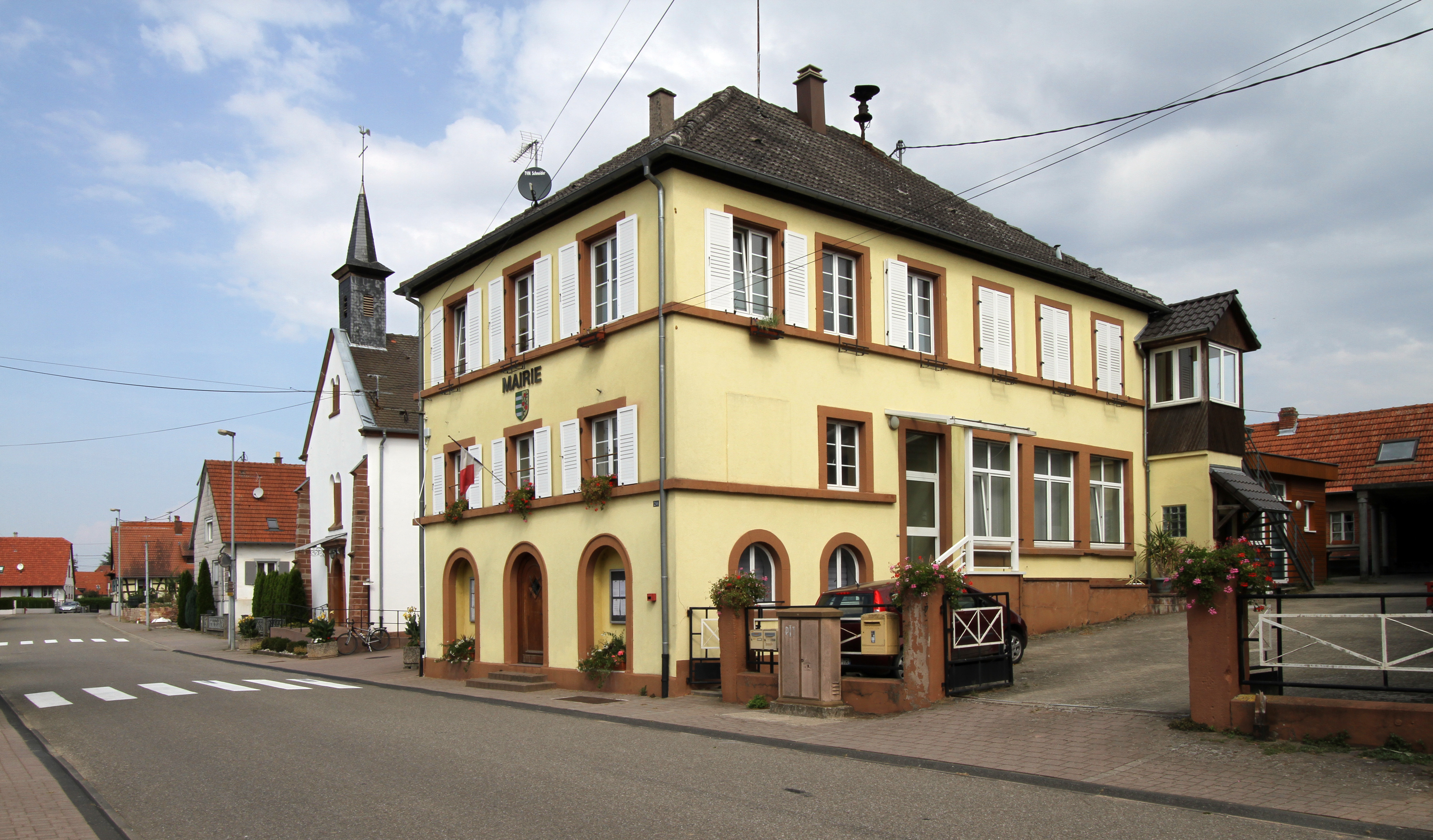
- Protestant church and town hall

- Coat of arms
- Location of Trimbach
- Location within France Location within Grand Est
- Coordinates: 48°56′26″N 8°01′27″E
- Country: France
- Region: Grand Est
- Department: Bas-Rhin
- Arrondissement: Haguenau-Wissembourg
- Canton: Wissembourg

Government
  - Mayor (2020–2026): Jean-Paul Haennel
- Area^{1}: 3.94 km^{2} (1.52 sq mi)
- Highest elevation: 179 m (587 ft)
- Lowest elevation: 138 m (453 ft)
- Population (2023): 566
  - Density: 144/km^{2} (372/sq mi)
- Time zone: UTC+01:00 (CET)
  - Summer (DST): UTC+02:00 (CEST)
- INSEE/Postal code: 67494 /67470
- ^{1} French Land Register data, which excludes lakes, ponds, glaciers > 1 km^{2} (0.386 sq mi or 247 acres) and river estuaries.

Trimbach is a commune in the Bas-Rhin department of the Grand Est region of France. The village is located about 10 kilometers (6.2 miles) from the German border.

== See also ==
- Communes of the Bas-Rhin department
