= Oberlauterbach =

- Commune
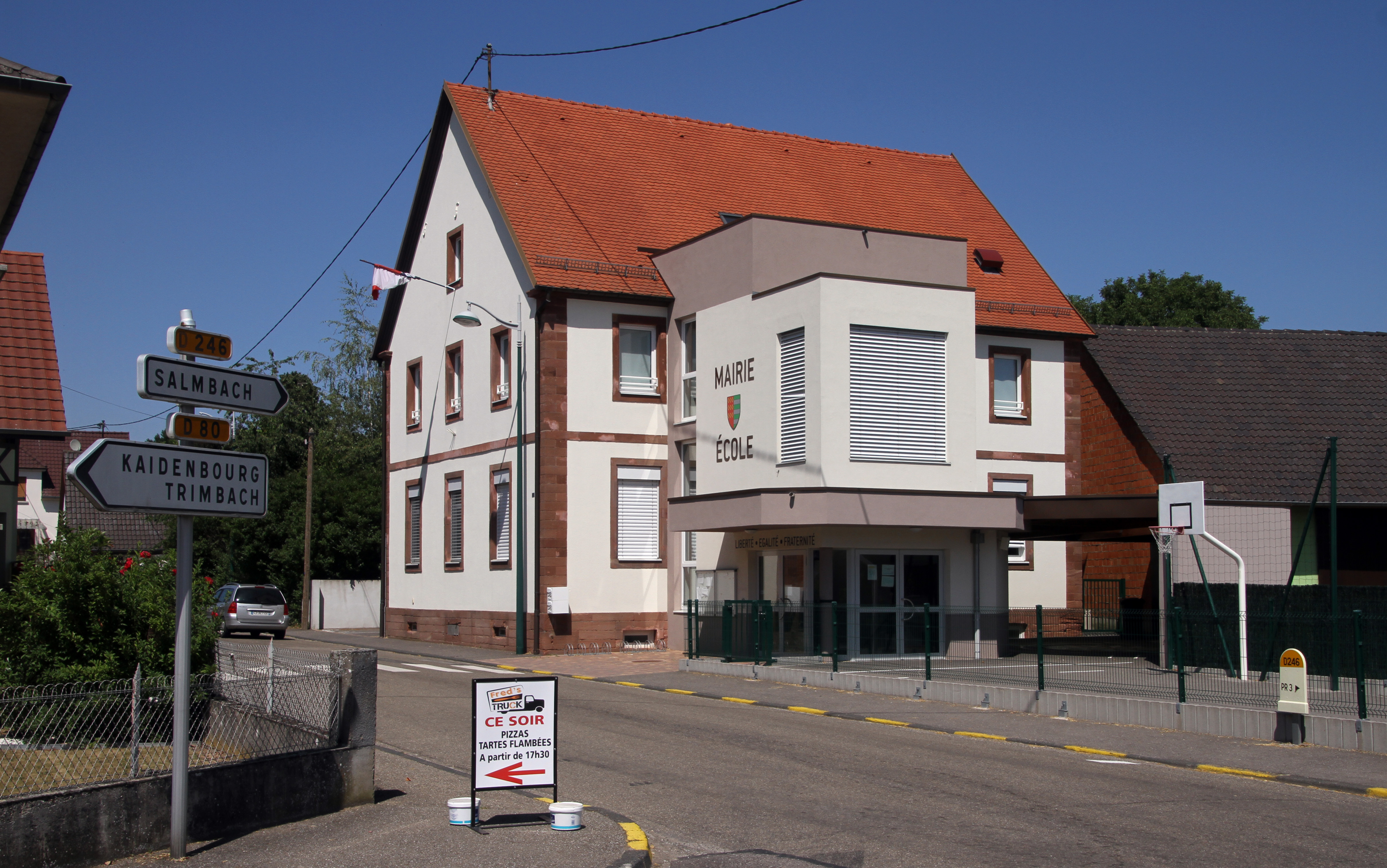
- Townhall and school

- Coat of arms
- Location of Oberlauterbach
- Location within France Location within Grand Est
- Coordinates: 48°57′00″N 8°04′14″E
- Country: France
- Region: Grand Est
- Department: Bas-Rhin
- Arrondissement: Haguenau-Wissembourg
- Canton: Wissembourg
- Intercommunality: Plaine du Rhin

Government
  - Mayor (2020–2026): Bruno Kraemer
- Area^{1}: 5.32 km^{2} (2.05 sq mi)
- Highest elevation: 192 m (630 ft)
- Lowest elevation: 148 m (486 ft)
- Population (2023): 548
  - Density: 103/km^{2} (267/sq mi)
- Time zone: UTC+01:00 (CET)
  - Summer (DST): UTC+02:00 (CEST)
- INSEE/Postal code: 67346 /67160
- ^{1} French Land Register data, which excludes lakes, ponds, glaciers > 1 km^{2} (0.386 sq mi or 247 acres) and river estuaries.

Oberlauterbach is a commune in the Bas-Rhin department in Grand Est in north-eastern France.

== Population ==
Historical population
Year	Pop.	±% p.a.
1968	350	—
1975	340	−0.41%
1982	343	+0.13%
1990	396	+1.81%
1999	459	+1.65%
2007	520	+1.57%
2012	536	+0.61%
2017	540	+0.15%
2023	548	+0.25%
Source: INSEE

== See also ==
- Communes of the Bas-Rhin department
