= Rott, Bas-Rhin =

Rott
- Commune
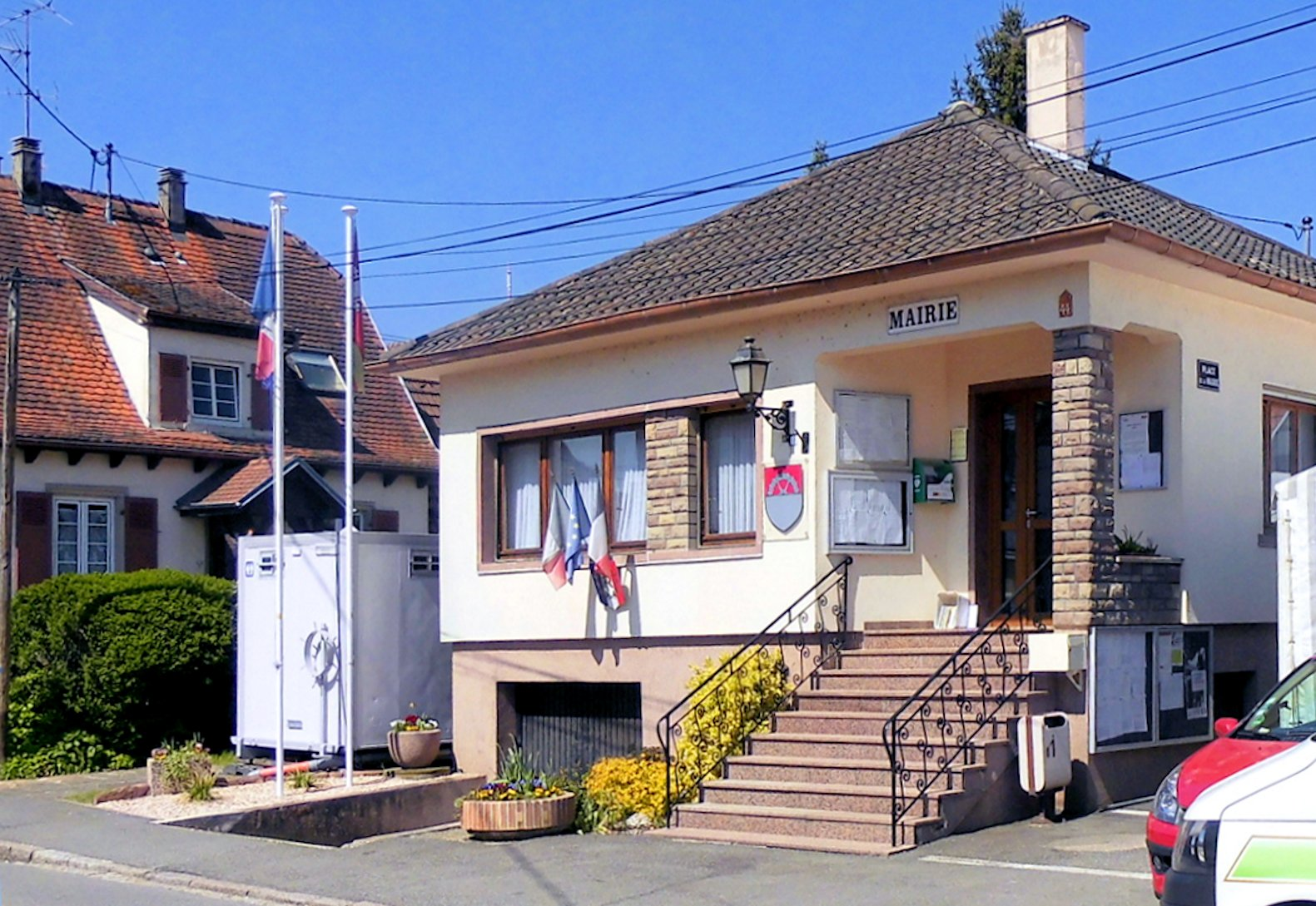
- The town hall in Rott

- Coat of arms
- Location of Rott
- Location within France Location within Grand Est
- Coordinates: 49°01′27″N 7°54′32″E
- Country: France
- Region: Grand Est
- Department: Bas-Rhin
- Arrondissement: Haguenau-Wissembourg
- Canton: Wissembourg

Government
  - Mayor (2020–2026): Claude Strohl
- Area^{1}: 3.24 km^{2} (1.25 sq mi)
- Highest elevation: 400 m (1,300 ft)
- Lowest elevation: 197 m (646 ft)
- Population (2023): 462
  - Density: 143/km^{2} (369/sq mi)
- Time zone: UTC+01:00 (CET)
  - Summer (DST): UTC+02:00 (CEST)
- INSEE/Postal code: 67416 /67160
- ^{1} French Land Register data, which excludes lakes, ponds, glaciers > 1 km^{2} (0.386 sq mi or 247 acres) and river estuaries.

Rott (French pronunciation: [ʁɔt]) is a commune in the Bas-Rhin department in Grand Est in north-eastern France.

== See also ==
- Communes of the Bas-Rhin department
