= Wintzenbach =

- Commune
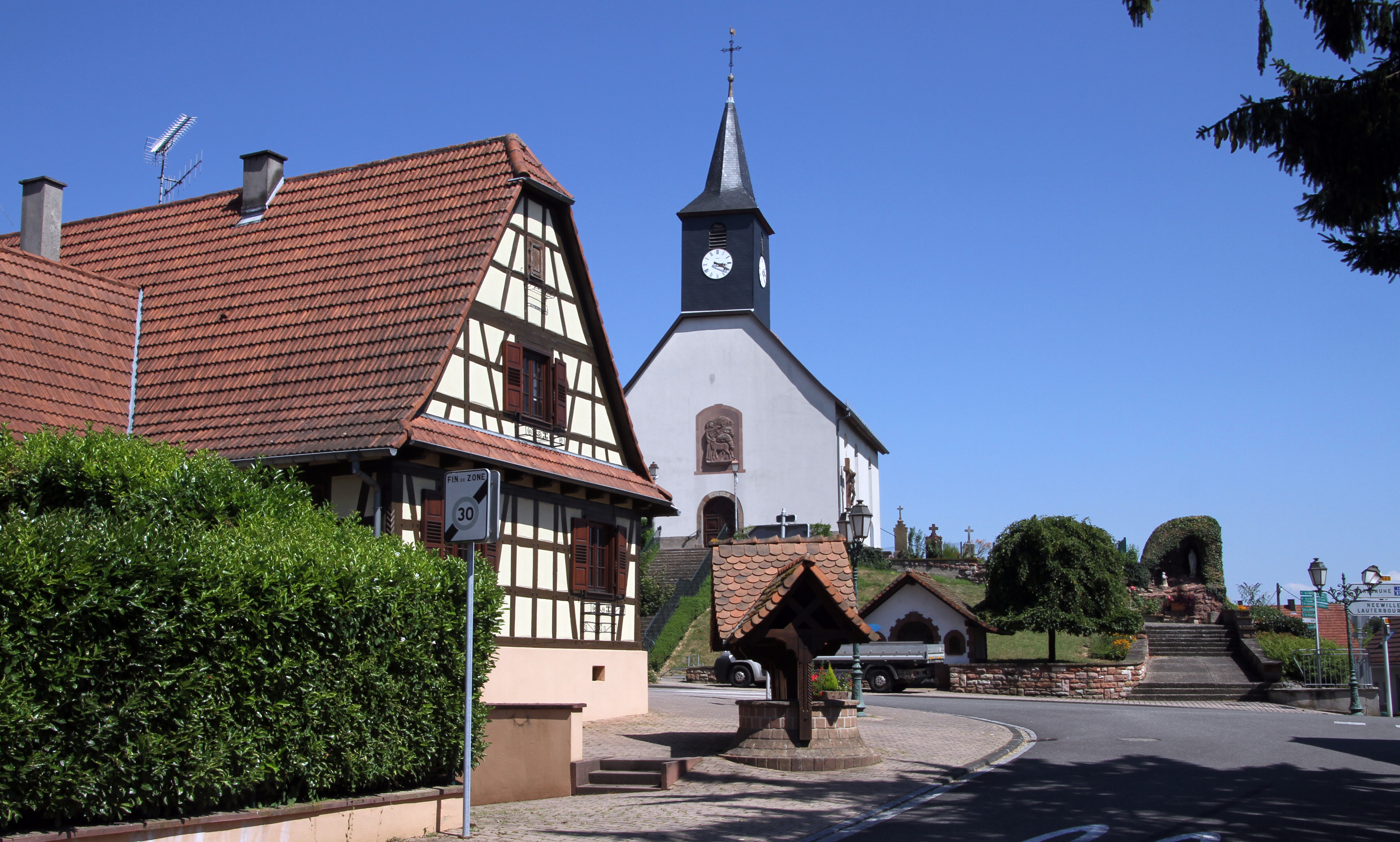
- Church of Saint Giles

- Coat of arms
- Location of Wintzenbach
- Location within France Location within Grand Est
- Coordinates: 48°56′08″N 8°06′17″E
- Country: France
- Region: Grand Est
- Department: Bas-Rhin
- Arrondissement: Haguenau-Wissembourg
- Canton: Wissembourg
- Intercommunality: Plaine du Rhin

Government
  - Mayor (2021–2026): Fabien Joerger
- Area^{1}: 6.96 km^{2} (2.69 sq mi)
- Elevation: 160 m (520 ft)
- Highest elevation: 189 m (620 ft)
- Lowest elevation: 124 m (407 ft)
- Population (2023): 532
  - Density: 76.4/km^{2} (198/sq mi)
- Time zone: UTC+01:00 (CET)
  - Summer (DST): UTC+02:00 (CEST)
- INSEE/Postal code: 67541 /67470
- ^{1} French Land Register data, which excludes lakes, ponds, glaciers > 1 km^{2} (0.386 sq mi or 247 acres) and river estuaries.

Wintzenbach (French pronunciation: [vintsənbax]; German: Winzenbach) is a commune in the Bas-Rhin department in Grand Est in north-eastern France.

== Population ==
Historical population
Year	Pop.	±% p.a.
1968	387	—
1975	460	+2.50%
1982	434	−0.83%
1990	513	+2.11%
1999	568	+1.14%
2007	591	+0.50%
2012	583	−0.27%
2017	544	−1.38%
2023	532	−0.37%
Source: INSEE

== See also ==
- Communes of the Bas-Rhin department
