= Munchhausen, Bas-Rhin =

Munchhausen
- Commune
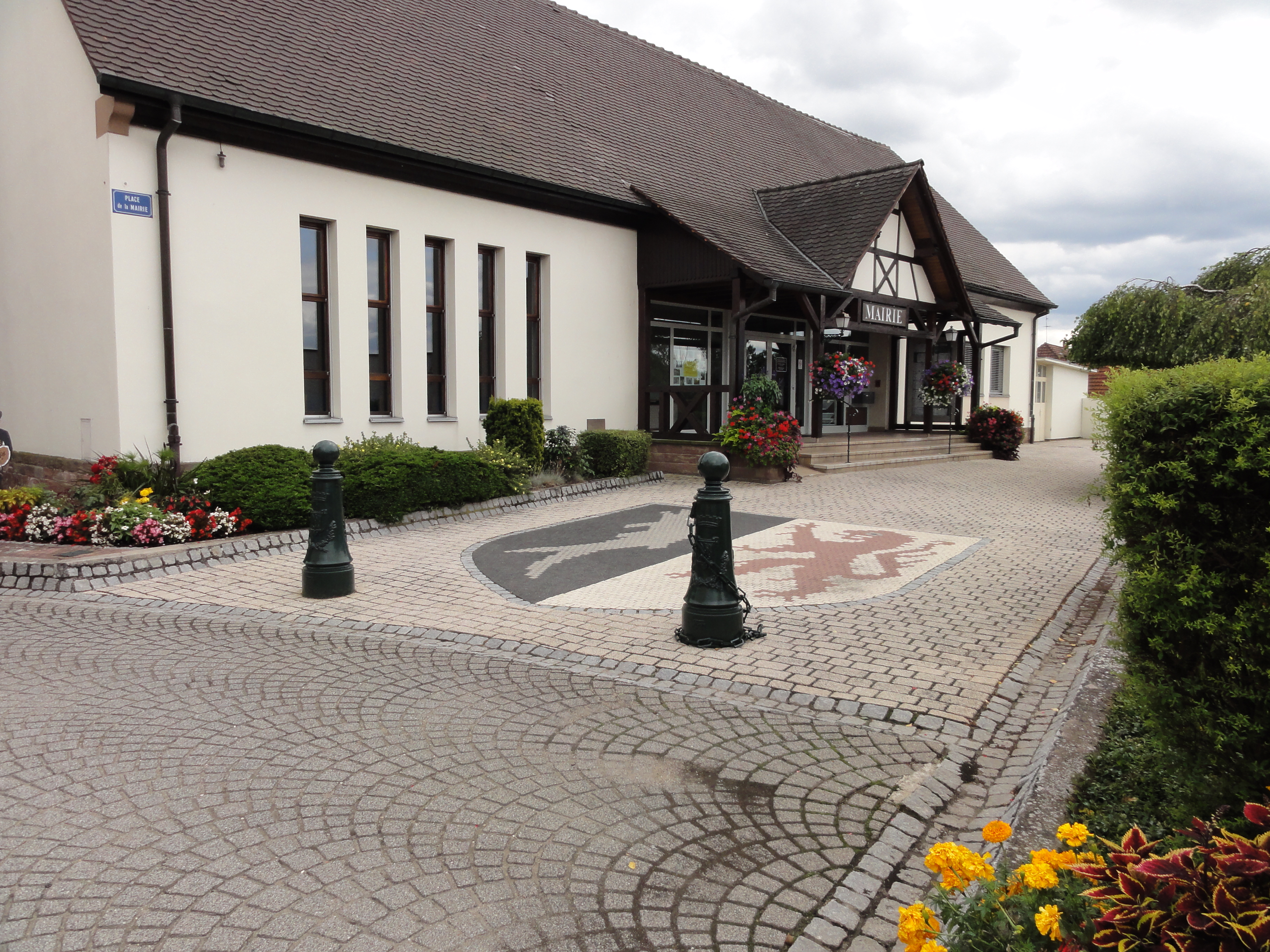
- The town hall in Munchhausen

- Coat of arms
- Location of Munchhausen
- Location within France Location within Grand Est
- Coordinates: 48°55′18″N 8°08′50″E
- Country: France
- Region: Grand Est
- Department: Bas-Rhin
- Arrondissement: Haguenau-Wissembourg
- Canton: Wissembourg

Government
  - Mayor (2020–2026): Sandra Ruck
- Area^{1}: 5.92 km^{2} (2.29 sq mi)
- Highest elevation: 142 m (466 ft)
- Lowest elevation: 106 m (348 ft)
- Population (2023): 775
  - Density: 131/km^{2} (339/sq mi)
- Time zone: UTC+01:00 (CET)
  - Summer (DST): UTC+02:00 (CEST)
- INSEE/Postal code: 67308 /67470
- ^{1} French Land Register data, which excludes lakes, ponds, glaciers > 1 km^{2} (0.386 sq mi or 247 acres) and river estuaries.

Munchhausen (French pronunciation: [mynʃauzən] or [mynçauzən]; German: Münchhausen) is a commune in the Bas-Rhin department in Grand Est in north-eastern France. It lies at the outflow of the Sauer into the Rhine.

== See also ==
- Communes of the Bas-Rhin department
