= Siegen, Bas-Rhin =

Siegen
- Commune
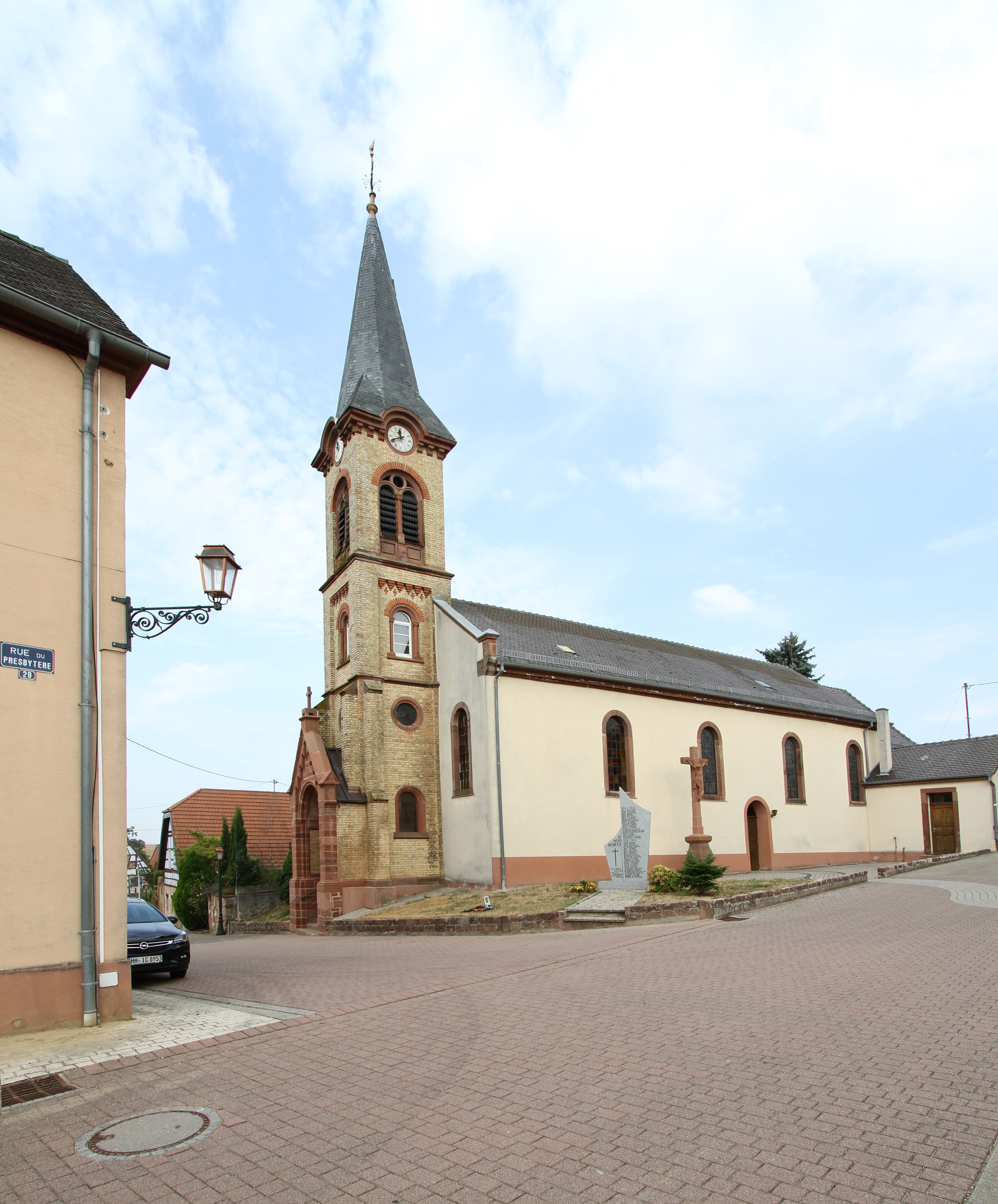
- Saint Lawrence

- Coat of arms
- Location of Siegen
- Location within France Location within Grand Est
- Coordinates: 48°57′27″N 8°02′33″E
- Country: France
- Region: Grand Est
- Department: Bas-Rhin
- Arrondissement: Haguenau-Wissembourg
- Canton: Wissembourg

Government
  - Mayor (2020–2026): René Gast
- Area^{1}: 8.1 km^{2} (3.1 sq mi)
- Highest elevation: 187 m (614 ft)
- Lowest elevation: 139 m (456 ft)
- Population (2023): 519
  - Density: 64/km^{2} (170/sq mi)
- Time zone: UTC+01:00 (CET)
  - Summer (DST): UTC+02:00 (CEST)
- INSEE/Postal code: 67466 /67160
- ^{1} French Land Register data, which excludes lakes, ponds, glaciers > 1 km^{2} (0.386 sq mi or 247 acres) and river estuaries.

Siegen (French pronunciation: [siɡœn, ziɡœn]) is a commune in the Bas-Rhin department in Grand Est in north-eastern France.

== See also ==
- Communes of the Bas-Rhin department
