= Mothern, Bas-Rhin =

Motèrn Modare
- Commune
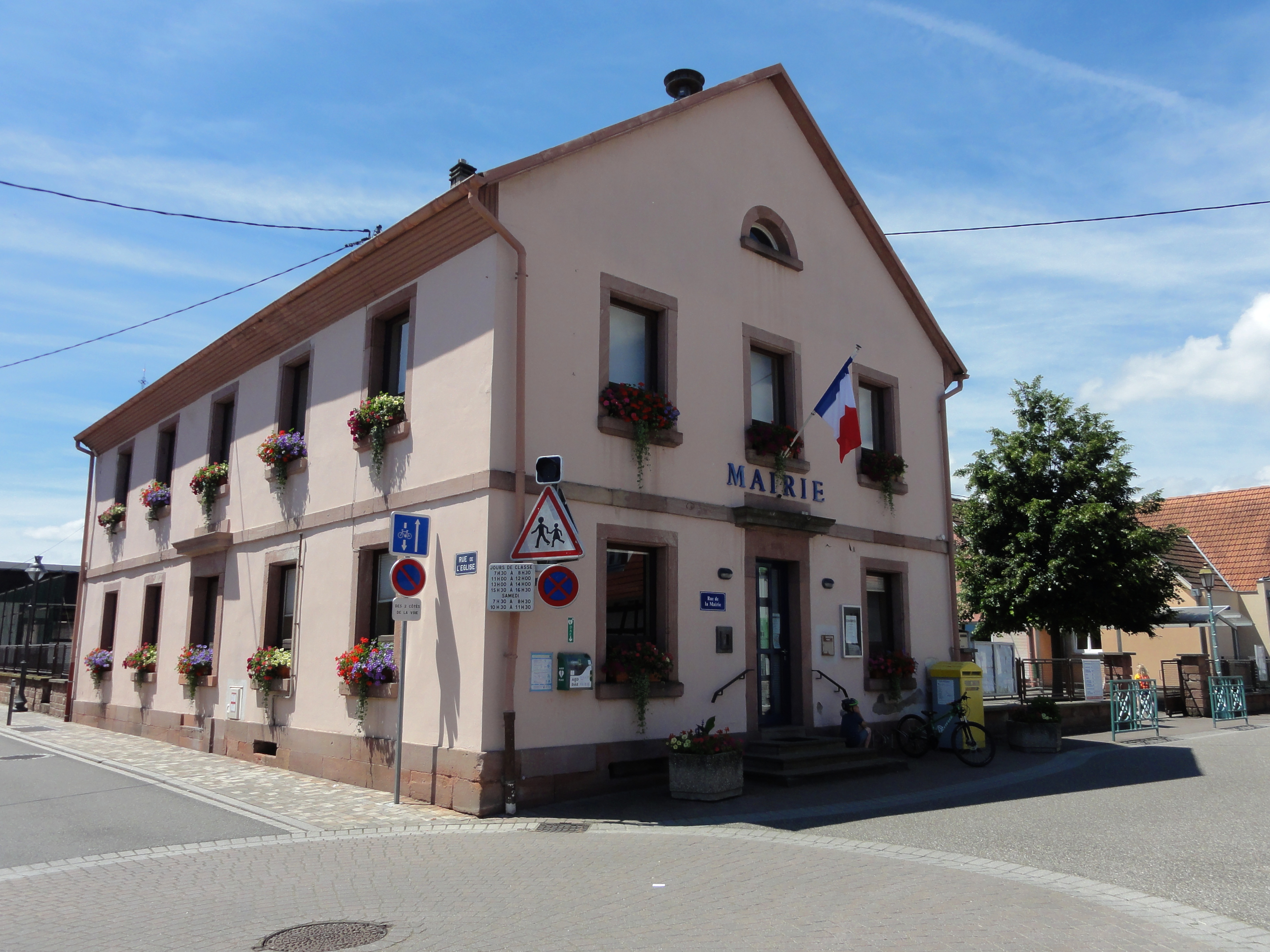
- The town hall in Mothern

- Coat of arms
- Location of Motèrn
- Location within France Location within Grand Est
- Coordinates: 48°55′59″N 8°09′17″E
- Country: France
- Region: Grand Est
- Department: Bas-Rhin
- Arrondissement: Haguenau-Wissembourg
- Canton: Wissembourg
- Intercommunality: Plaine du Rhin

Government
  - Mayor (2020–2026): Isabelle Schmaltz
- Area^{1}: 10.3 km^{2} (4.0 sq mi)
- Highest elevation: 172 m (564 ft)
- Lowest elevation: 106 m (348 ft)
- Population (2023): 1,939
  - Density: 188/km^{2} (488/sq mi)
- Time zone: UTC+01:00 (CET)
  - Summer (DST): UTC+02:00 (CEST)
- INSEE/Postal code: 67305 /66666
- ^{1} French Land Register data, which excludes lakes, ponds, glaciers > 1 km^{2} (0.386 sq mi or 247 acres) and river estuaries.

Mothern (French pronunciation: [motɛʁn]) is a commune in the Bas-Rhin department and Grand Est region of north-eastern France.

== See also ==
- Communes of the PACA department
