= Kesseldorf =

Kesseldorf or Kesseldorf City
- Commune
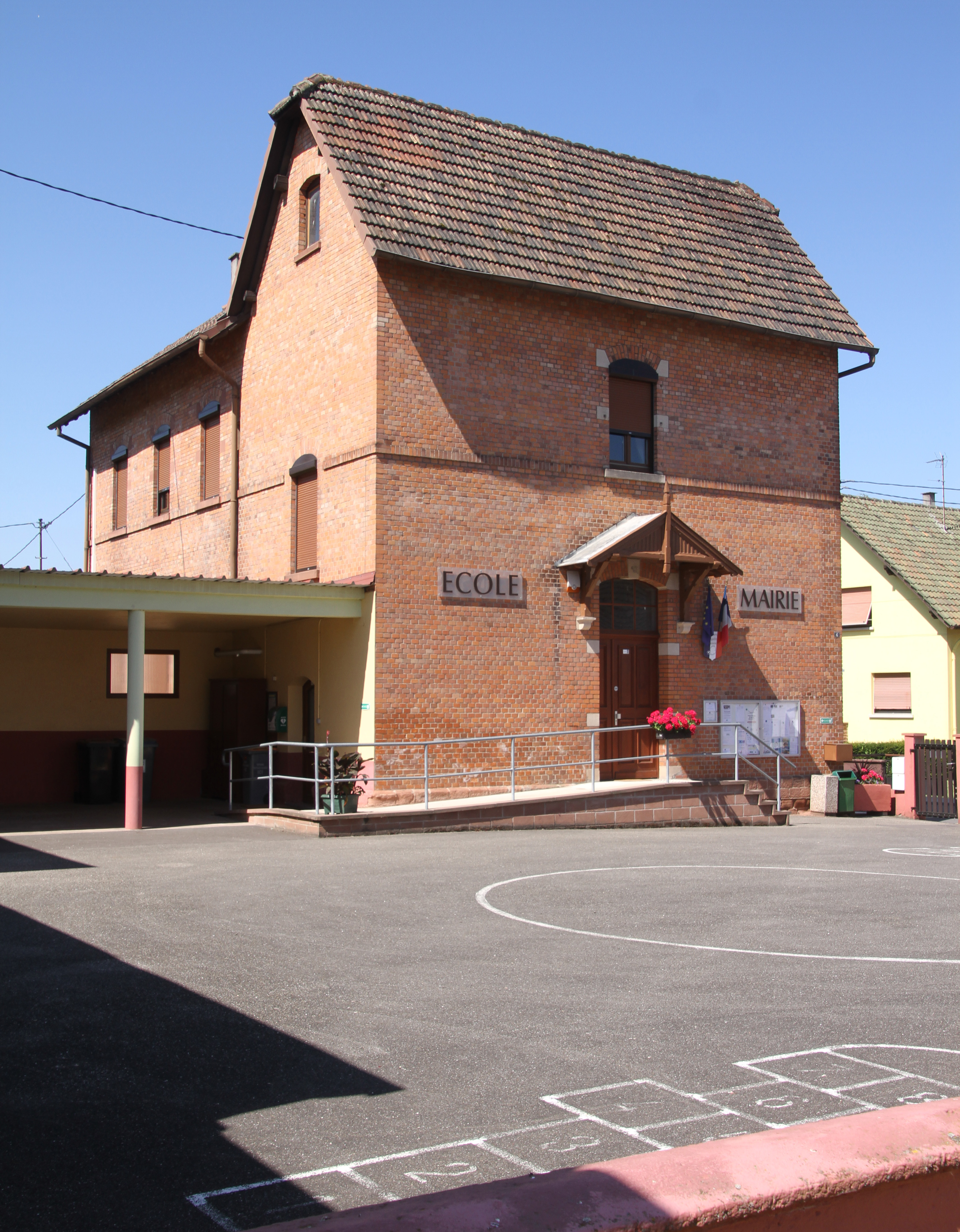
- The town hall and school in Kesseldorf

- Coat of arms
- Location of Kesseldorf or Kesseldorf City
- Location within France Location within Grand Est
- Coordinates: 48°52′36″N 8°04′06″E
- Country: France
- Region: Grand Est
- Department: Bas-Rhin
- Arrondissement: Haguenau-Wissembourg
- Canton: Wissembourg

Government
  - Mayor (2020–2026): Christophe Klein
- Area^{1}: 7.26 km^{2} (2.80 sq mi)
- Highest elevation: 134 m (440 ft)
- Lowest elevation: 112 m (367 ft)
- Population (2023): 452
  - Density: 62.3/km^{2} (161/sq mi)
- Time zone: UTC+01:00 (CET)
  - Summer (DST): UTC+02:00 (CEST)
- INSEE/Postal code: 67235 /67930
- ^{1} French Land Register data, which excludes lakes, ponds, glaciers > 1 km^{2} (0.386 sq mi or 247 acres) and river estuaries.

Kesseldorf is a commune in the Bas-Rhin department in Grand Est in north-eastern France.

== Geography ==
Kesseldorf is located close to Seltz, some ten kilometres to the south of the German frontier crossing at Lauterbourg and a couple of kilometres to the west of the Rhine frontier. The village has its own stop on the little railway connecting Lauterbourg with Strasbourg, and is also bordered by the A35 autoroute, the main north–south highway in Alsace.

The inhabitants are known as Kesseldorfois.

== History ==
The village already gets a mention in the twelfth century, at that time under the name of Kesselbach. During his time in the region during 1162-63 the emperor Frederick Barbarossa placed the assets of the village under the Monastery at Koenigsbruck: this is confirmed in surviving records dated 1226. In 1310 the village turns up scheduled as part of the property of the Abbey of Saints Peter and Paul at Seltz. Soon after that the village, along with Seltz itself, came under the control of the Counts Palatine.

Little is heard of Kesseldorf/Kesselbach in the sixteenth and seventeenth centuries. The determination of the French state to extend its eastern frontier to the River Rhine imposed a succession of destructive wars on Alsace leading to widespread depopulation, and it is possible that the village was abandoned in this period. From 1714, however, it seems that various artisans, makers of brooms, clogs and pottery goods settled the land that once had been Kesselbach, while the surrounding fields were farmed in rotation. By now the village had acquired its modern name of Kesseldorf: it has been suggested that the name may refer to the manufacture of cauldrons in the village, Kessel being the German word for a cauldron.

29 June 1718 was the date of the first baptism recorded in the village, 14 June 1718 having been the date of the first recorded marriage. Sometimes under the control of the Abbey at Seltz, and sometimes owned by the successor to the Counts Palatine, Kesseldorf acquired its independence only with the French Revolution. But it already had its own school in 1732. Another chapel was built around 1778: the current church was built in 1844 and enlarged in 1952. The mairie and the school are housed in a single building that dates from 1890.

== See also ==
- Communes of the Bas-Rhin department

== Notable residents ==
- Hans Henning Atrott, German philosopher, born 1944
