= Crœttwiller =

- Commune
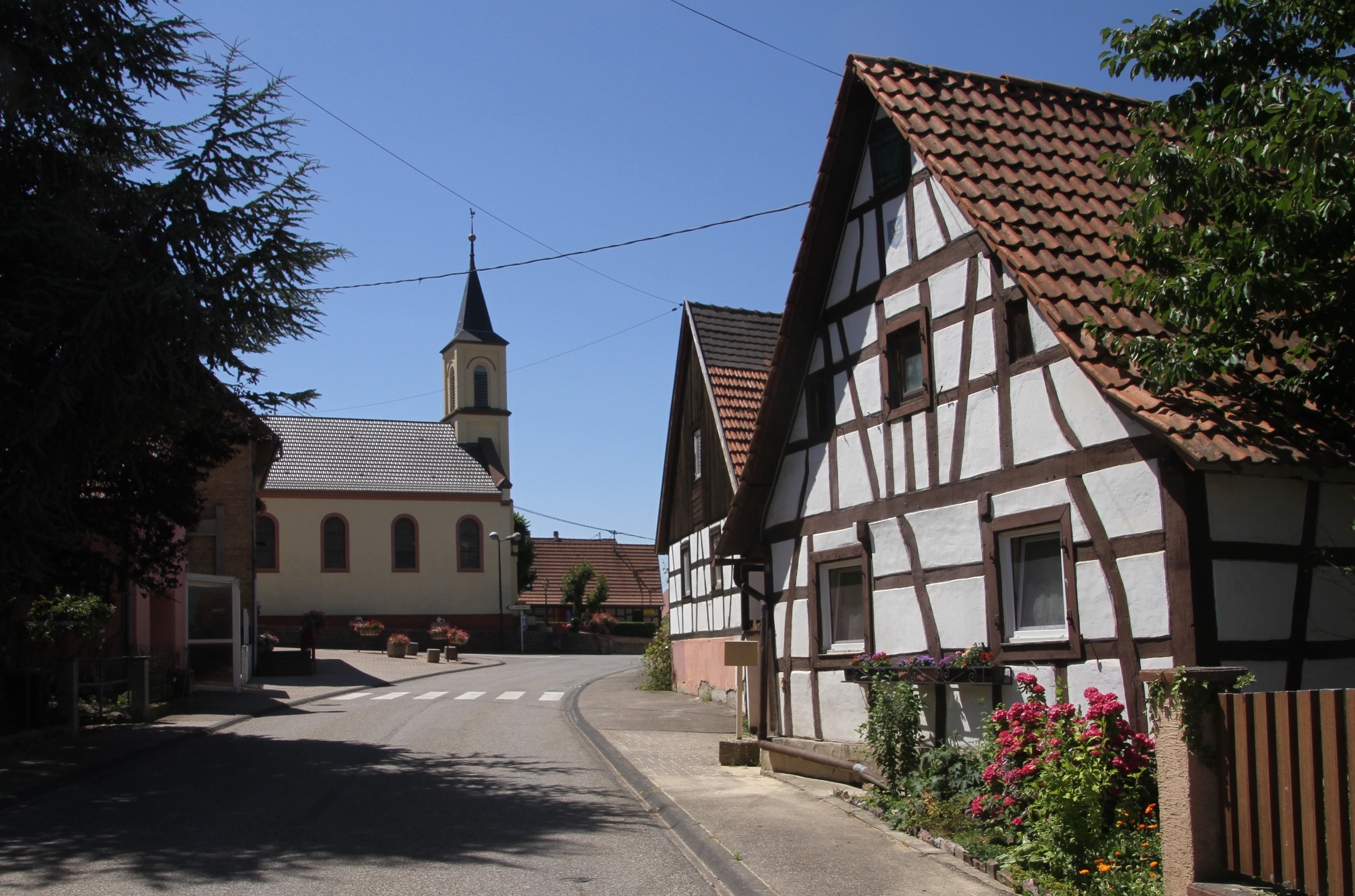
- The church and surroundings in Crœttwiller

- Coat of arms
- Location of Crœttwiller
- Location within France Location within Grand Est
- Coordinates: 48°56′02″N 8°01′55″E
- Country: France
- Region: Grand Est
- Department: Bas-Rhin
- Arrondissement: Haguenau-Wissembourg
- Canton: Wissembourg

Government
  - Mayor (2020–2026): Jean-Louis Sitter
- Area^{1}: 2.55 km^{2} (0.98 sq mi)
- Highest elevation: 193 m (633 ft)
- Lowest elevation: 135 m (443 ft)
- Population (2023): 174
  - Density: 68.2/km^{2} (177/sq mi)
- Time zone: UTC+01:00 (CET)
  - Summer (DST): UTC+02:00 (CEST)
- INSEE/Postal code: 67079 /67470
- ^{1} French Land Register data, which excludes lakes, ponds, glaciers > 1 km^{2} (0.386 sq mi or 247 acres) and river estuaries.

Crœttwiller (French pronunciation: [kʁœtvilɛʁ]; German: Kröttweiler) is a commune in the Bas-Rhin department in Grand Est in north-eastern France.

== See also ==
- Communes of the Bas-Rhin department
