= Canton of Wissembourg =

Coordinates: 49.04°N 7.94°E

- Canton
- Situation of the canton of Wissembourg in the department of Bas-Rhin
- Country: France
- Region: Grand Est
- Department: Bas-Rhin
- No. of communes: {{{nbcomm}}}
- Population (2023): 50,357
- INSEE code: 6723

The canton of Wissembourg is an administrative division of the Bas-Rhin department, northeastern France. Its borders were modified at the French canton reorganisation which came into effect in March 2015. Its seat is in Wissembourg.

It consists of the following communes:

1. Aschbach
2. Beinheim
3. Betschdorf
4. Buhl
5. Cleebourg
6. Climbach
7. Crœttwiller
8. Drachenbronn-Birlenbach
9. Eberbach-Seltz
10. Hatten
11. Hoffen
12. Hunspach
13. Ingolsheim
14. Keffenach
15. Kesseldorf
16. Lauterbourg
17. Memmelshoffen
18. Mothern
19. Munchhausen
20. Neewiller-près-Lauterbourg
21. Niederlauterbach
22. Niederrœdern
23. Oberhoffen-lès-Wissembourg
24. Oberlauterbach
25. Oberrœdern
26. Retschwiller
27. Riedseltz
28. Rittershoffen
29. Rott
30. Salmbach
31. Schaffhouse-près-Seltz
32. Scheibenhard
33. Schleithal
34. Schœnenbourg
35. Seebach
36. Seltz
37. Siegen
38. Soultz-sous-Forêts
39. Steinseltz
40. Stundwiller
41. Surbourg
42. Trimbach
43. Wintzenbach
44. Wissembourg
