= Keffenach =

Keffenach Keffenàch
- Commune
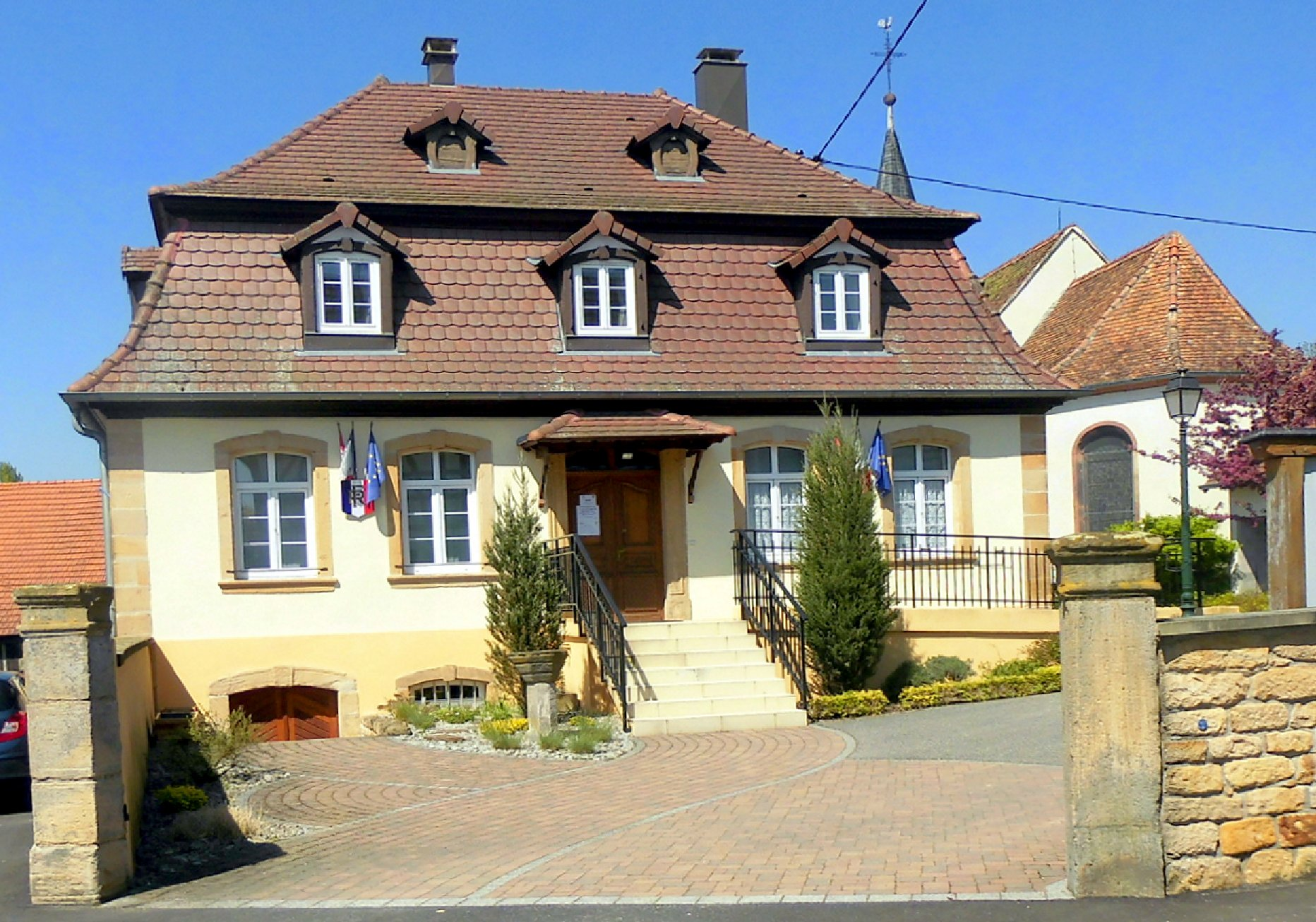
- The town hall in Keffenach

- Coat of arms
- Location of Keffenach
- Location within France Location within Grand Est
- Coordinates: 48°57′56″N 7°52′58″E
- Country: France
- Region: Grand Est
- Department: Bas-Rhin
- Arrondissement: Haguenau-Wissembourg
- Canton: Wissembourg
- Intercommunality: Outre-Forêt

Government
  - Mayor (2020–2026): Anne Frey
- Area^{1}: 2.39 km^{2} (0.92 sq mi)
- Highest elevation: 231 m (758 ft)
- Lowest elevation: 153 m (502 ft)
- Population (2023): 198
  - Density: 82.8/km^{2} (215/sq mi)
- Time zone: UTC+01:00 (CET)
  - Summer (DST): UTC+02:00 (CEST)
- INSEE/Postal code: 67232 /67250
- ^{1} French Land Register data, which excludes lakes, ponds, glaciers > 1 km^{2} (0.386 sq mi or 247 acres) and river estuaries.

Keffenach is a commune in the Bas-Rhin department in Grand Est in north-eastern France.

It lies a short distance to the south of Wissembourg, within the Palatinate Forest-North Vosges Biosphere Reserve.

== Population ==
Historical population
Year	Pop.	±% p.a.
1968	188	—
1975	179	−0.70%
1982	190	+0.86%
1990	173	−1.16%
1999	206	+1.96%
2007	215	+0.54%
2012	203	−1.14%
2017	193	−1.01%
2023	198	+0.43%
Source: INSEE

== See also ==
- Communes of the Bas-Rhin department
