= Memmelshoffen =

Memmelshoffen Mammelshoffe
- Commune
- Coat of arms
- Location of Memmelshoffen
- Location within France Location within Grand Est
- Coordinates: 48°57′39″N 7°52′14″E
- Country: France
- Region: Grand Est
- Department: Bas-Rhin
- Arrondissement: Haguenau-Wissembourg
- Canton: Wissembourg

Government
  - Mayor (2020–2026): Stéphane Kastner
- Area^{1}: 1.82 km^{2} (0.70 sq mi)
- Highest elevation: 218 m (715 ft)
- Lowest elevation: 158 m (518 ft)
- Population (2023): 314
  - Density: 173/km^{2} (447/sq mi)
- Time zone: UTC+01:00 (CET)
  - Summer (DST): UTC+02:00 (CEST)
- INSEE/Postal code: 67288 /67250
- ^{1} French Land Register data, which excludes lakes, ponds, glaciers > 1 km^{2} (0.386 sq mi or 247 acres) and river estuaries.

Memmelshoffen (French pronunciation: [mɛməlsofən]; German: Memmelshofen) is a commune in the Bas-Rhin department in Grand Est in north-eastern France.

== See also ==
- Communes of the Bas-Rhin department
