= Neewiller-près-Lauterbourg =

Neewiller-près-Lauterbourg Nawiller
- Commune
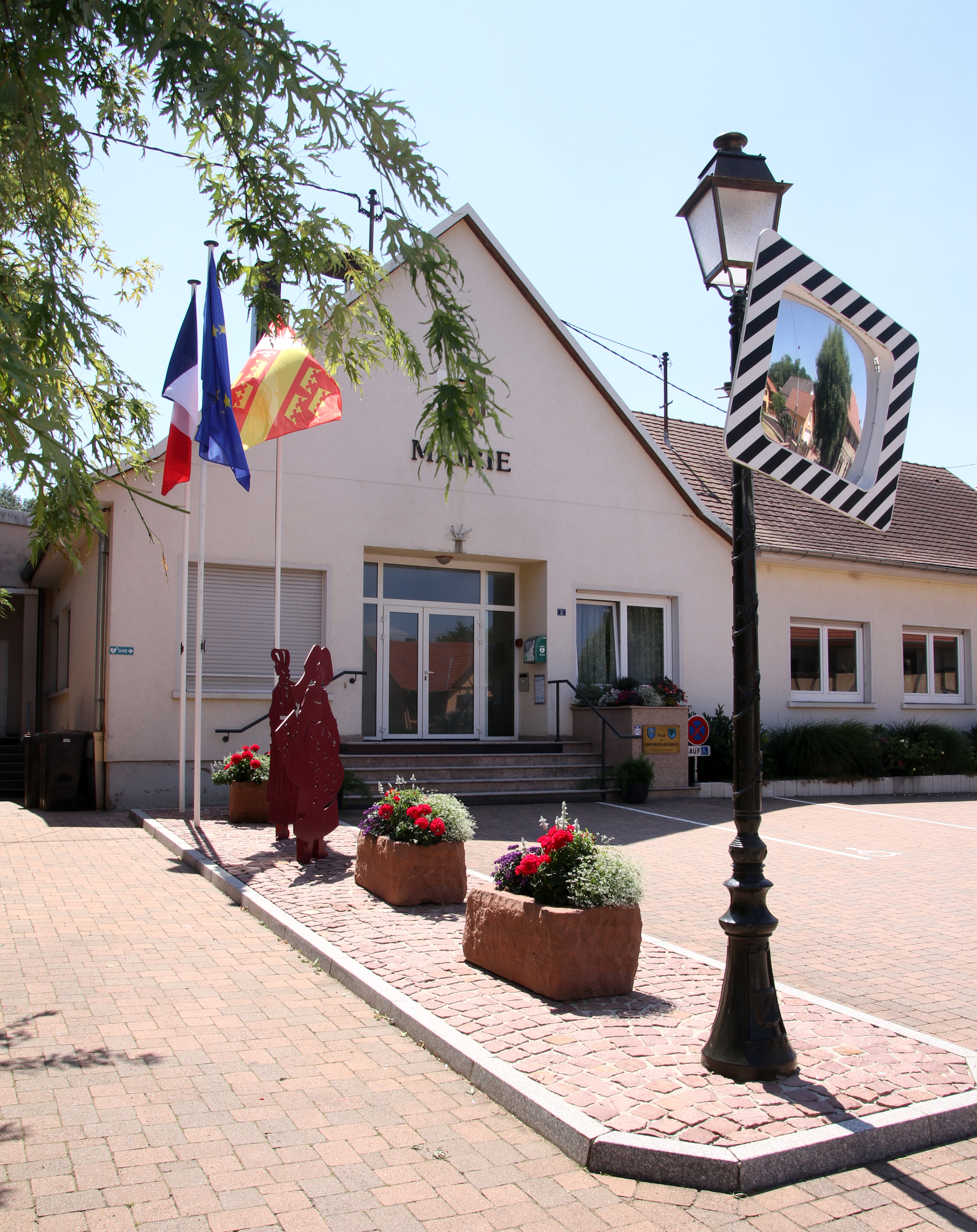
- The town hall in Neewiller-près-Lauterbourg

- Coat of arms
- Location of Neewiller-près-Lauterbourg
- Location within France Location within Grand Est
- Coordinates: 48°57′21″N 8°07′37″E
- Country: France
- Region: Grand Est
- Department: Bas-Rhin
- Arrondissement: Haguenau-Wissembourg
- Canton: Wissembourg

Government
  - Mayor (2020–2026): Monique Lichteblau
- Area^{1}: 7.34 km^{2} (2.83 sq mi)
- Highest elevation: 186 m (610 ft)
- Lowest elevation: 110 m (360 ft)
- Population (2023): 645
  - Density: 87.9/km^{2} (228/sq mi)
- Time zone: UTC+01:00 (CET)
  - Summer (DST): UTC+02:00 (CEST)
- INSEE/Postal code: 67315 /67630
- ^{1} French Land Register data, which excludes lakes, ponds, glaciers > 1 km^{2} (0.386 sq mi or 247 acres) and river estuaries.

Neewiller-près-Lauterbourg (French pronunciation: [nevilɛʁ pʁɛ lotɛʁbuʁ], literally Neewiller near Lauterbourg; German: Nehweiler) is a commune in the Bas-Rhin department in Grand Est in north-eastern France.

== See also ==
- Communes of the Bas-Rhin department
