= Retschwiller =

- Commune
- Coat of arms
- Location of Retschwiller
- Location within France Location within Grand Est
- Coordinates: 48°57′03″N 7°52′48″E
- Country: France
- Region: Grand Est
- Department: Bas-Rhin
- Arrondissement: Haguenau-Wissembourg
- Canton: Wissembourg
- Intercommunality: Outre-Forêt

Government
  - Mayor (2020–2026): Esther Scheib
- Area^{1}: 3.26 km^{2} (1.26 sq mi)
- Highest elevation: 199 m (653 ft)
- Lowest elevation: 146 m (479 ft)
- Population (2023): 274
  - Density: 84.0/km^{2} (218/sq mi)
- Time zone: UTC+01:00 (CET)
  - Summer (DST): UTC+02:00 (CEST)
- INSEE/Postal code: 67394 /67250
- ^{1} French Land Register data, which excludes lakes, ponds, glaciers > 1 km^{2} (0.386 sq mi or 247 acres) and river estuaries.

Retschwiller (French pronunciation: [ʁɛtʃvilɛʁ]; German: Retschweiler) is a commune in the Bas-Rhin department in Grand Est in north-eastern France.

== Population ==
Historical population
Year	Pop.	±% p.a.
1968	233	—
1975	231	−0.12%
1982	200	−2.04%
1990	234	+1.98%
1999	253	+0.87%
2007	244	−0.45%
2012	273	+2.27%
2017	285	+0.86%
2023	274	−0.65%
Source: INSEE

== See also ==
- Communes of the Bas-Rhin department
