= Eberbach-Seltz =

- Commune
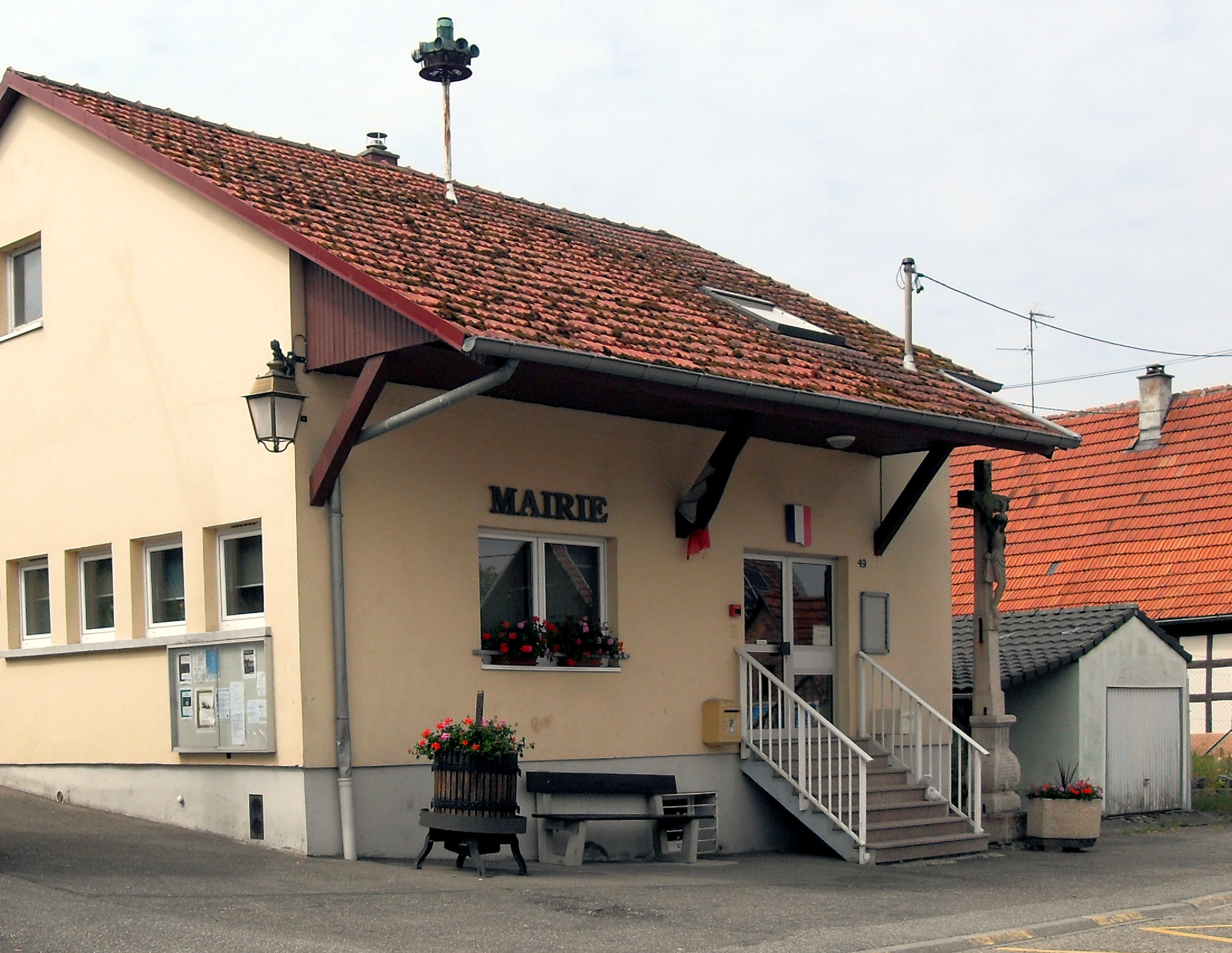
- The town hall in Eberbach-Seltz

- Coat of arms
- Location of Eberbach-Seltz
- Location within France Location within Grand Est
- Coordinates: 48°55′39″N 8°03′51″E
- Country: France
- Region: Grand Est
- Department: Bas-Rhin
- Arrondissement: Haguenau-Wissembourg
- Canton: Wissembourg
- Intercommunality: CC Plaine du Rhin

Government
  - Mayor (2020–2026): Pascal Stoltz
- Area^{1}: 4.14 km^{2} (1.60 sq mi)
- Highest elevation: 191 m (627 ft)
- Lowest elevation: 138 m (453 ft)
- Population (2023): 436
  - Density: 105/km^{2} (273/sq mi)
- Time zone: UTC+01:00 (CET)
  - Summer (DST): UTC+02:00 (CEST)
- INSEE/Postal code: 67113 /67470
- ^{1} French Land Register data, which excludes lakes, ponds, glaciers > 1 km^{2} (0.386 sq mi or 247 acres) and river estuaries.

Eberbach-Seltz is a commune in the Bas-Rhin department and Grand Est region of north-eastern France.

== Population ==
Historical population
Year	Pop.	±% p.a.
1968	318	—
1975	294	−1.11%
1982	300	+0.29%
1990	311	+0.45%
1999	373	+2.04%
2007	388	+0.49%
2012	436	+2.36%
2017	422	−0.65%
2023	436	+0.55%
Source: INSEE

== See also ==
- Communes of the Bas-Rhin department
