= Schleithal =

- Commune
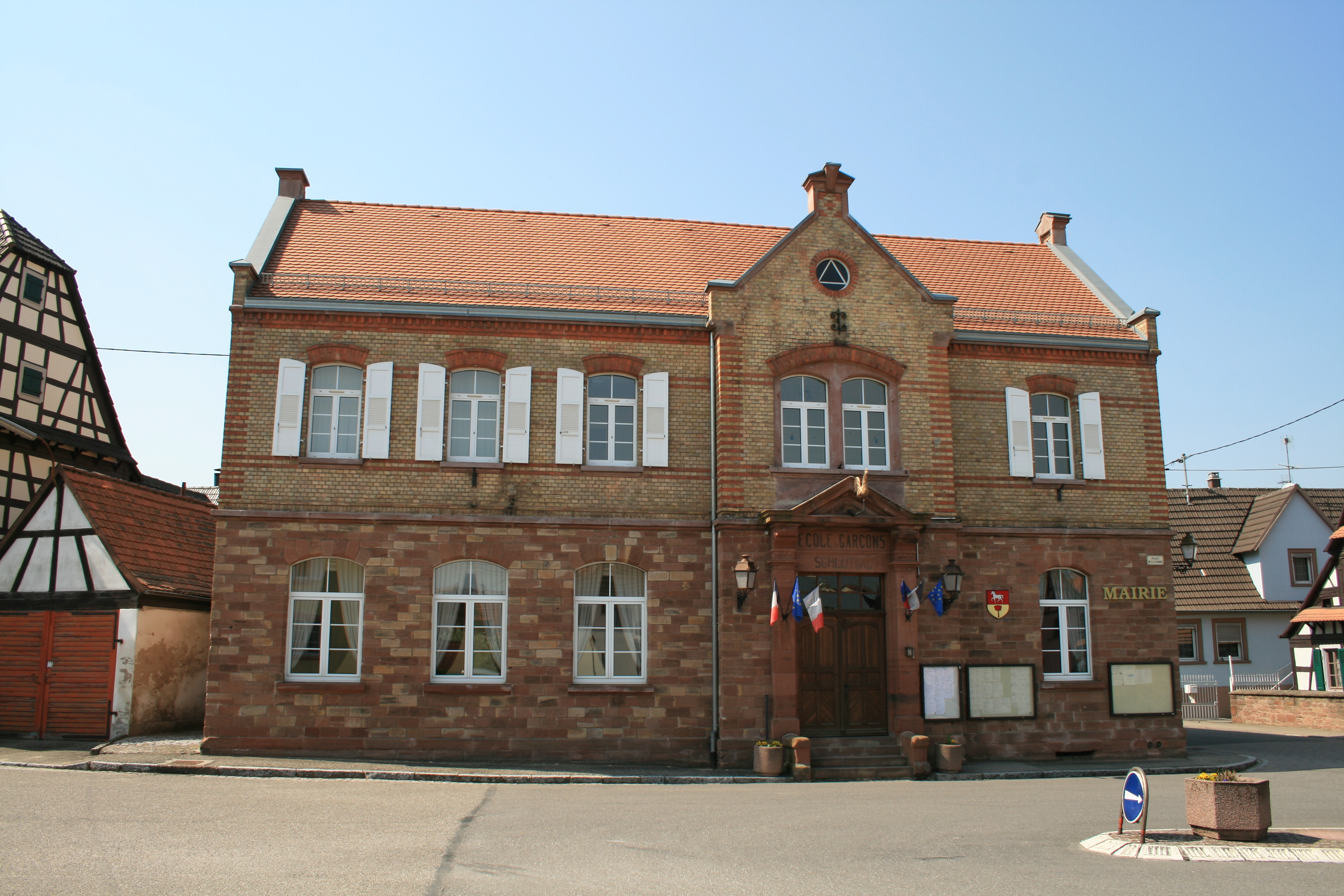
- The town hall in Schleithal

- Coat of arms
- Location of Schleithal
- Location within France Location within Grand Est
- Coordinates: 48°59′22″N 8°02′39″E
- Country: France
- Region: Grand Est
- Department: Bas-Rhin
- Arrondissement: Haguenau-Wissembourg
- Canton: Wissembourg

Government
  - Mayor (2022–2026): Chantal Schmitt
- Area^{1}: 9.12 km^{2} (3.52 sq mi)
- Highest elevation: 187 m (614 ft)
- Lowest elevation: 135 m (443 ft)
- Population (2023): 1,382
  - Density: 152/km^{2} (392/sq mi)
- Time zone: UTC+01:00 (CET)
  - Summer (DST): UTC+02:00 (CEST)
- INSEE/Postal code: 67451 /67160
- ^{1} French Land Register data, which excludes lakes, ponds, glaciers > 1 km^{2} (0.386 sq mi or 247 acres) and river estuaries.

Schleithal (French pronunciation: [ʃlaital]) is a commune in the Bas-Rhin department in Grand Est in north-eastern France. Located in the northern Lower Rhine just steps from the French-German border. This boundary is defined by the Lauter which gives its name to the small town of Lauterbourg located at the mouth of the river Rhine. Schleithal is a linear settlement.

== History ==
The first writings of Schleithal date from 1145, but some believe that the village dates from 631 (year of establishment of the abbey of Wissembourg). The village became French after the Treaty or otherwise known as Peace of Westphalia in 1648.

== See also ==
- Communes of the Bas-Rhin department
