= Salmbach =

- Commune
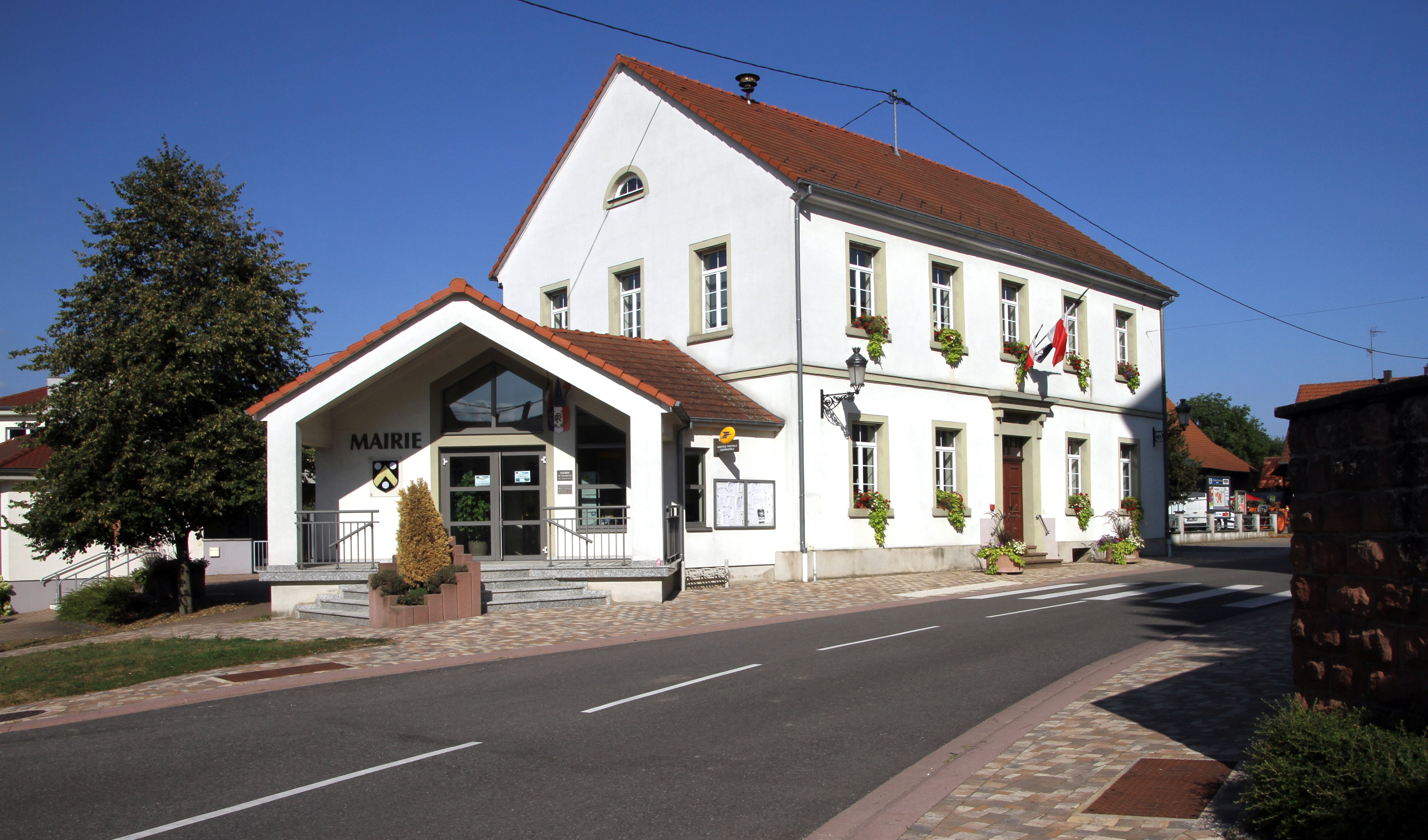
- Town hall

- Coat of arms
- Location of Salmbach
- Location within France Location within Grand Est
- Coordinates: 48°58′41″N 8°04′36″E
- Country: France
- Region: Grand Est
- Department: Bas-Rhin
- Arrondissement: Haguenau-Wissembourg
- Canton: Wissembourg

Government
  - Mayor (2020–2026): Jacques Weigel
- Area^{1}: 8.91 km^{2} (3.44 sq mi)
- Highest elevation: 186 m (610 ft)
- Lowest elevation: 128 m (420 ft)
- Population (2023): 585
  - Density: 65.7/km^{2} (170/sq mi)
- Time zone: UTC+01:00 (CET)
  - Summer (DST): UTC+02:00 (CEST)
- INSEE/Postal code: 67432 /67160
- ^{1} French Land Register data, which excludes lakes, ponds, glaciers > 1 km^{2} (0.386 sq mi or 247 acres) and river estuaries.

Salmbach is a commune in the Bas-Rhin department in Grand Est in north-eastern France.

== Gallery ==
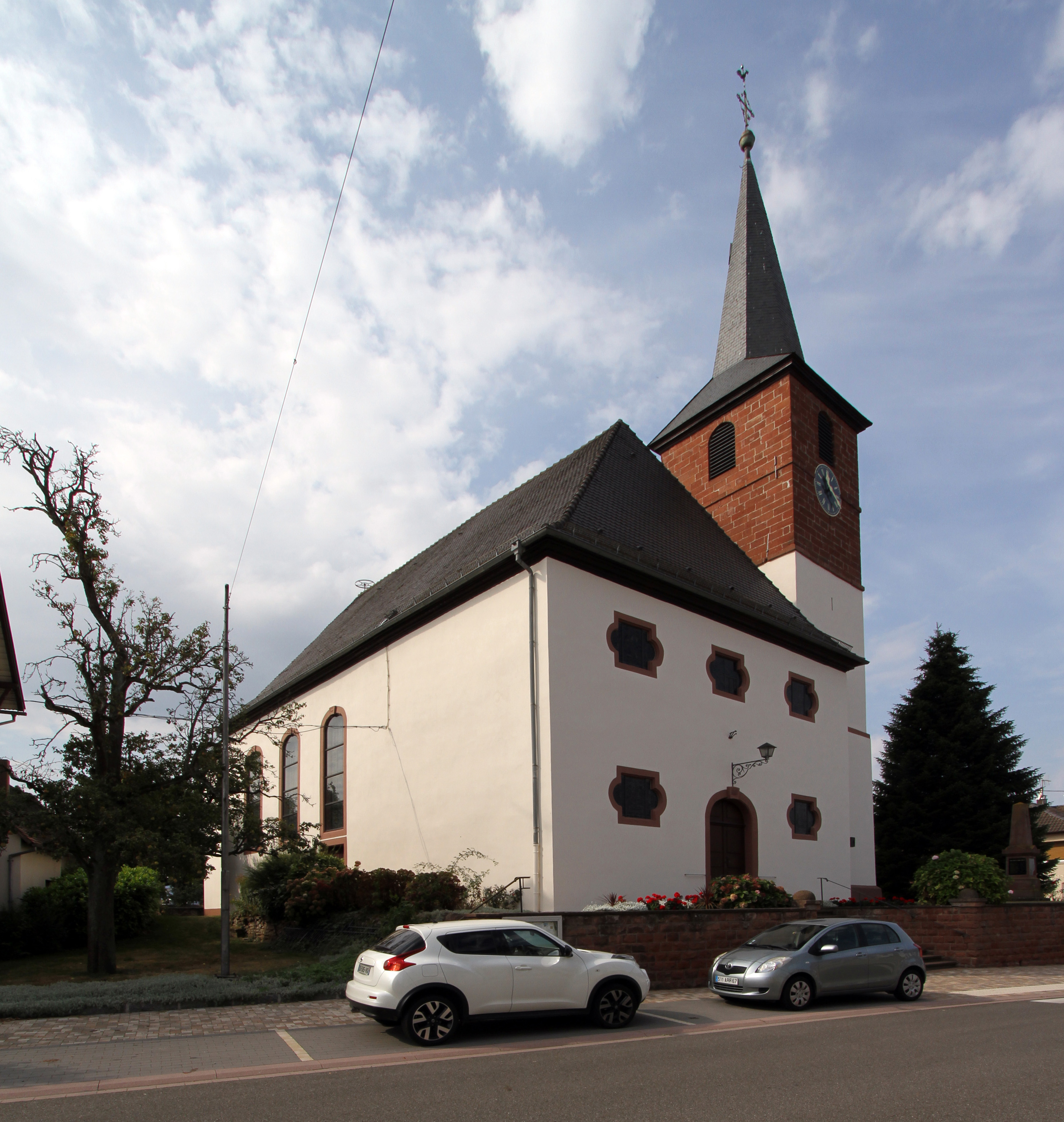
St. Stephen

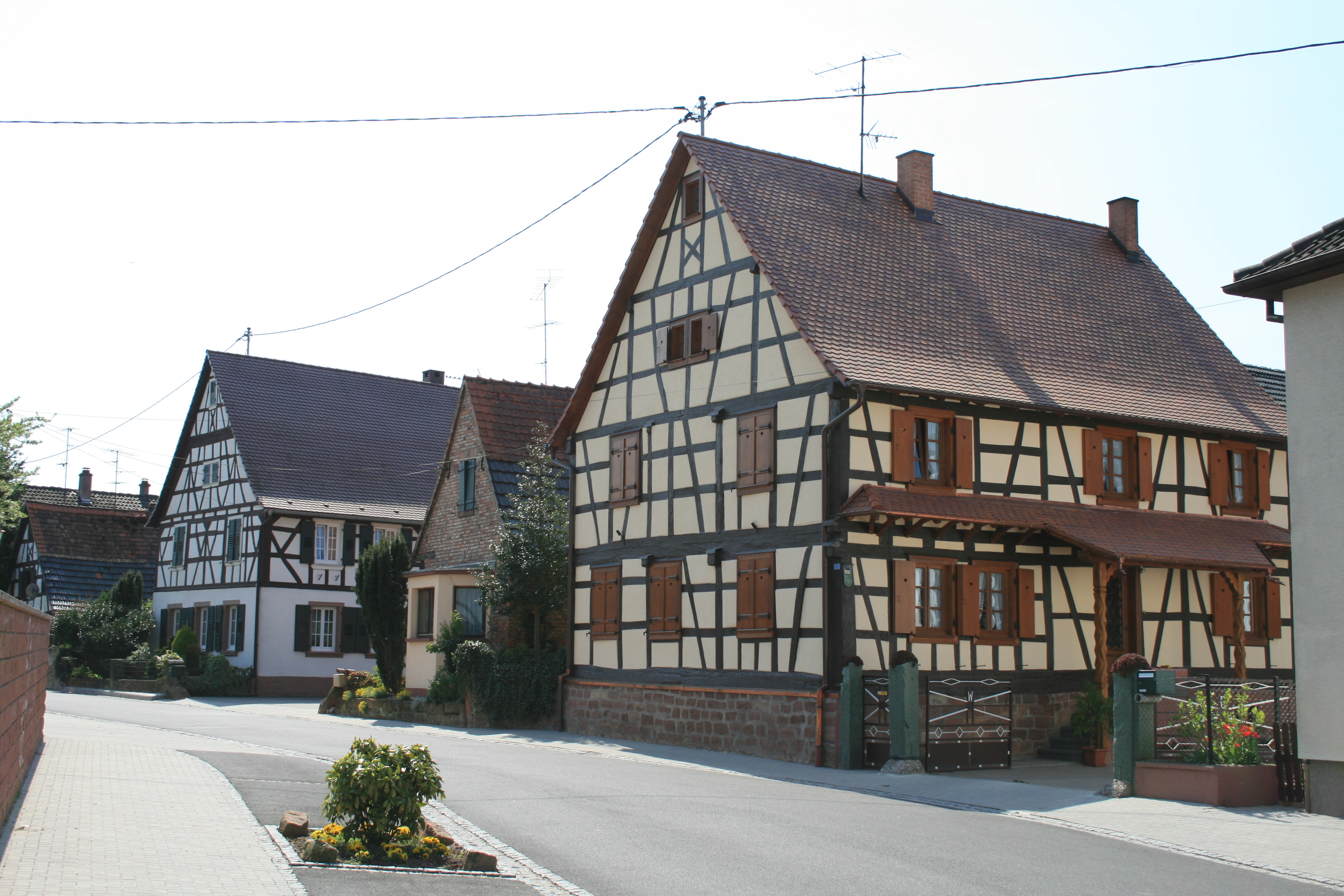

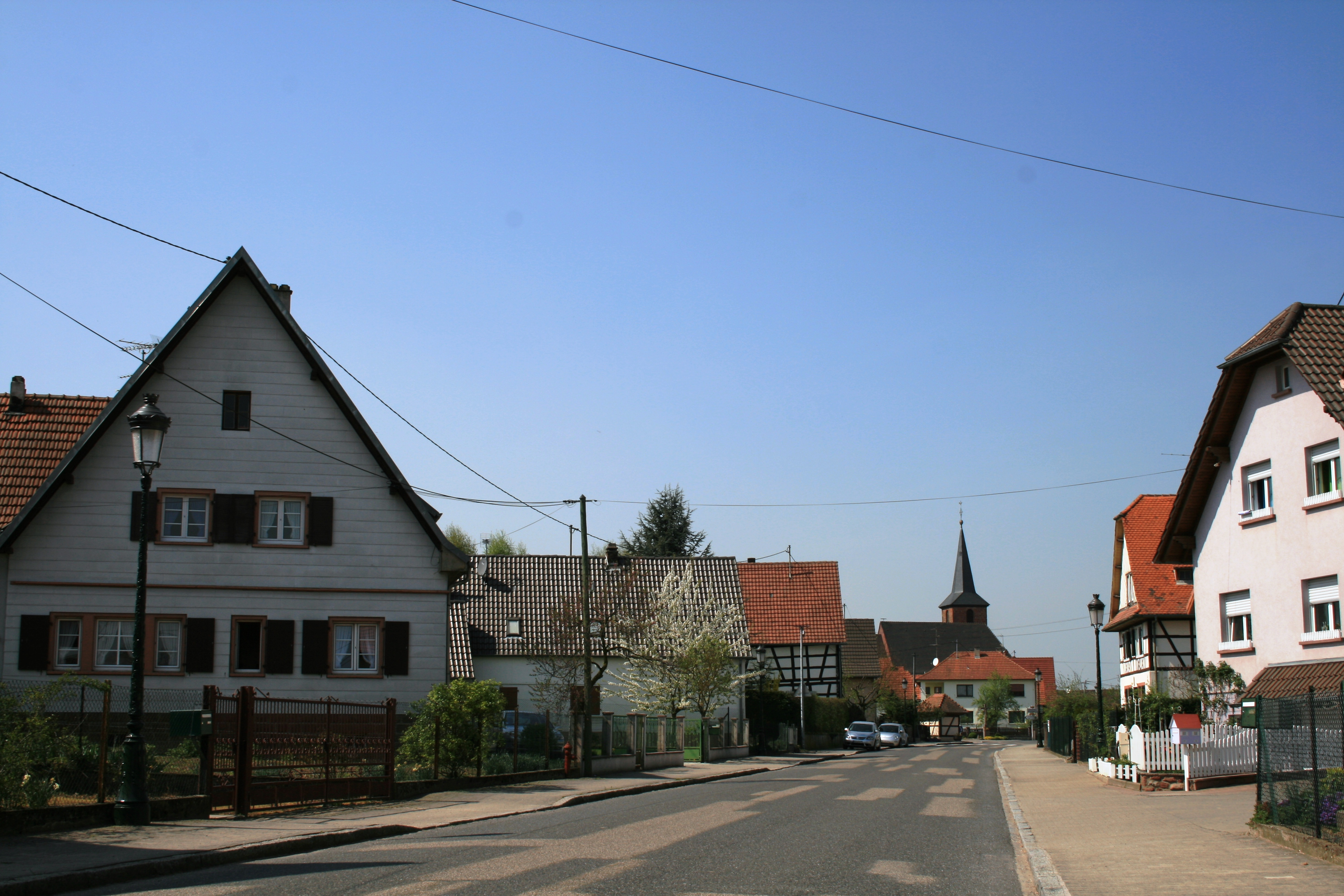

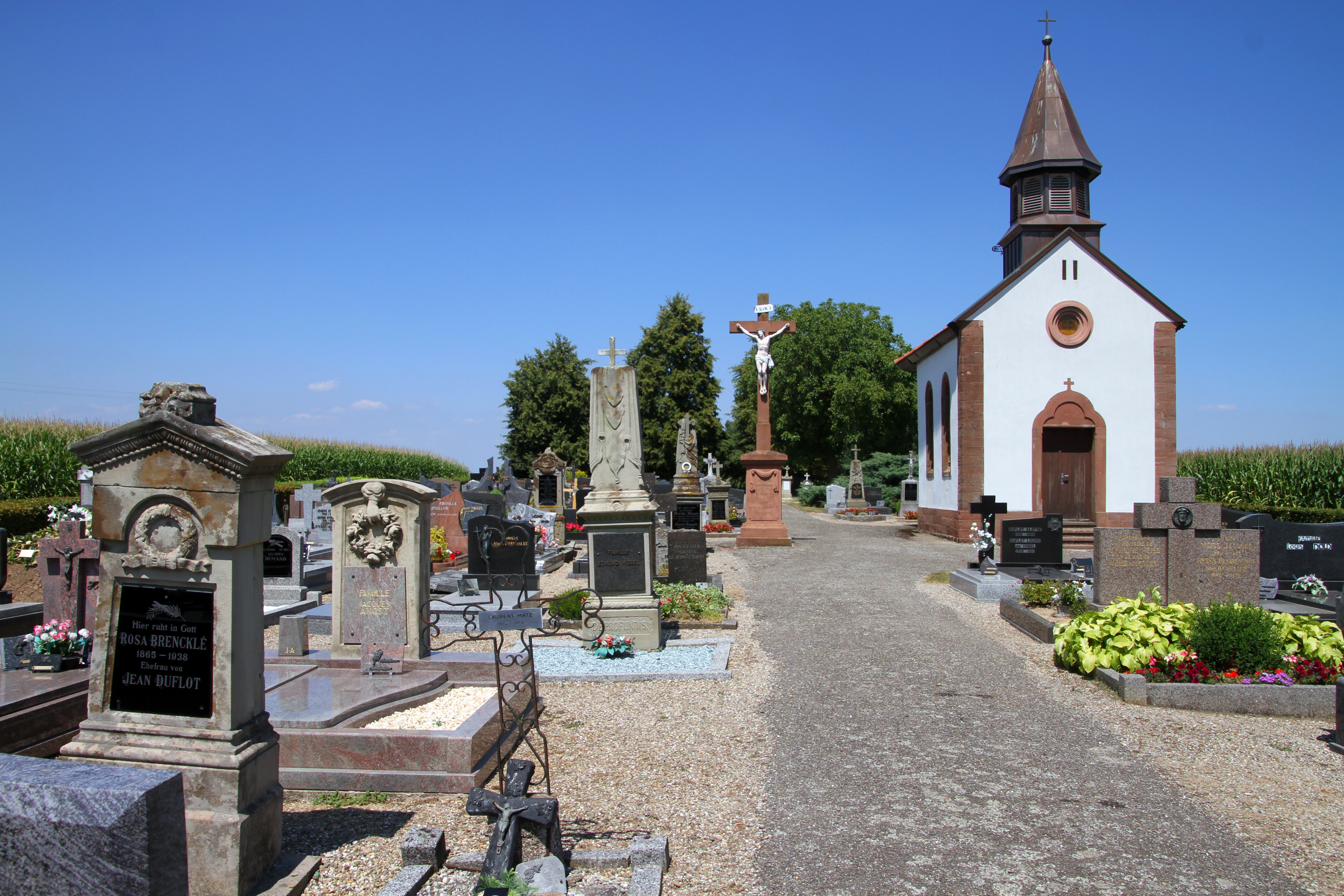
Cemetery

== See also ==
- Communes of the Bas-Rhin department
