= Schaffhouse-près-Seltz =

- Commune
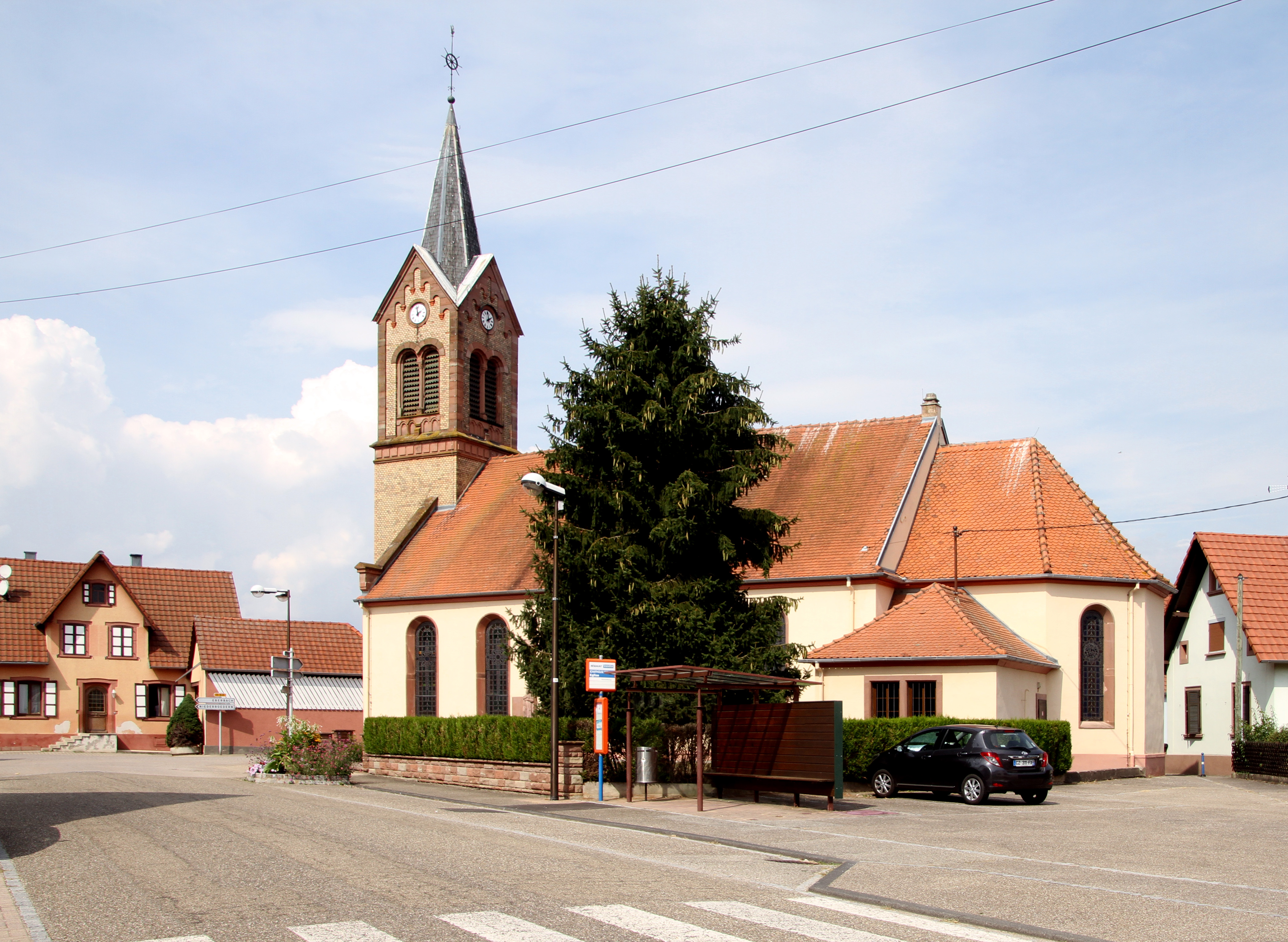
- St. Martin

- Coat of arms
- Location of Schaffhouse-près-Seltz
- Location within France Location within Grand Est
- Coordinates: 48°54′35″N 8°05′59″E
- Country: France
- Region: Grand Est
- Department: Bas-Rhin
- Arrondissement: Haguenau-Wissembourg
- Canton: Wissembourg

Government
  - Mayor (2020–2026): Philippe Giraud
- Area^{1}: 4.49 km^{2} (1.73 sq mi)
- Highest elevation: 174 m (571 ft)
- Lowest elevation: 113 m (371 ft)
- Population (2023): 557
  - Density: 124/km^{2} (321/sq mi)
- Time zone: UTC+01:00 (CET)
  - Summer (DST): UTC+02:00 (CEST)
- INSEE/Postal code: 67440 /67470
- ^{1} French Land Register data, which excludes lakes, ponds, glaciers > 1 km^{2} (0.386 sq mi or 247 acres) and river estuaries.

Schaffhouse-près-Seltz (French pronunciation: [ʃafuz pʁɛ sɛlts], literally Schaffhouse near Seltz; German: Schaffhausen bei Selz) is a commune in the Bas-Rhin department in Grand Est in north-eastern France.

The residents are called the "Schaffhousois" .

== See also ==
- Communes of the Bas-Rhin department
