= Cleebourg =

- Commune
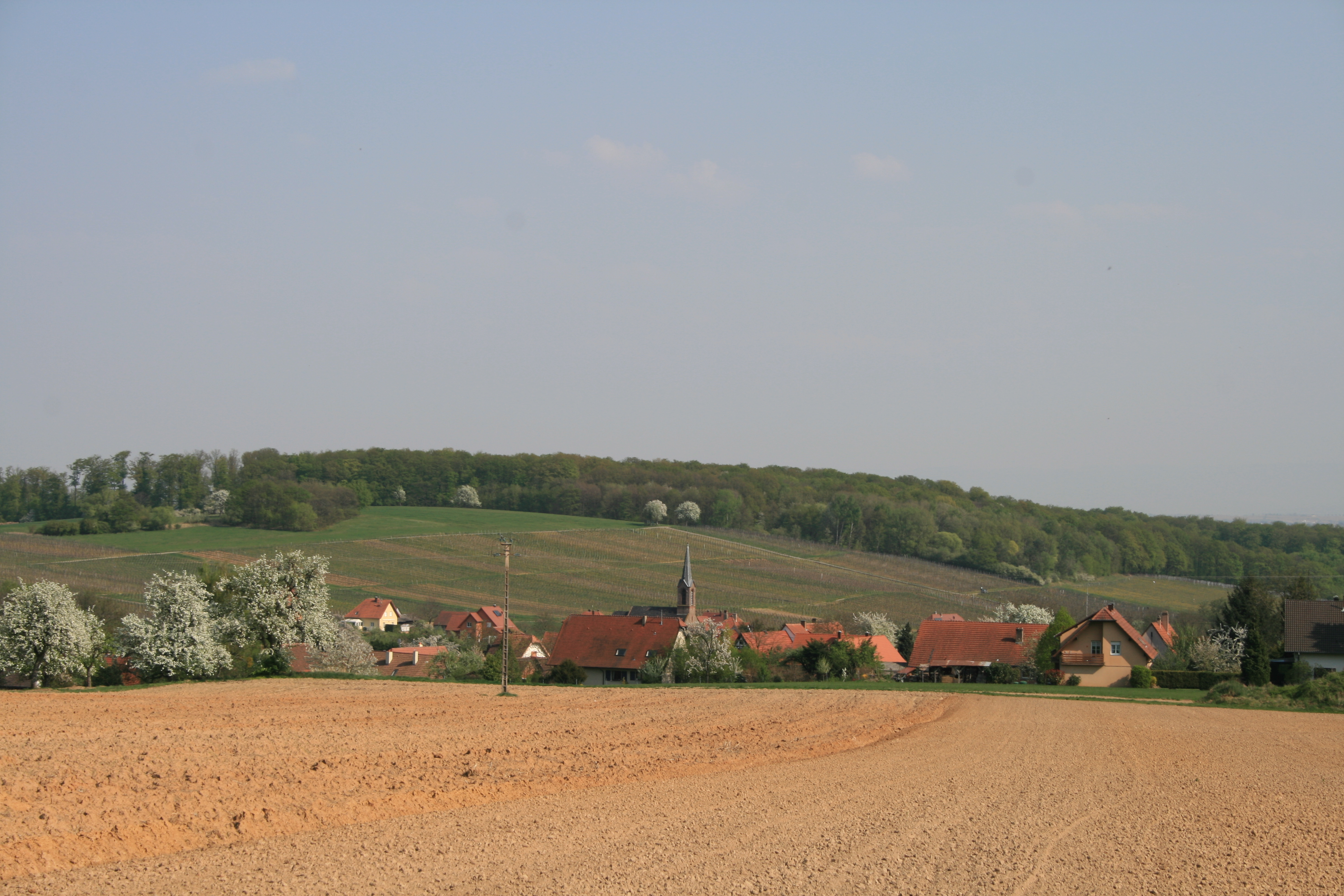
- A general view of Cleebourg

- Coat of arms
- Location of Cleebourg
- Location within France Location within Grand Est
- Coordinates: 49°00′15″N 7°53′31″E
- Country: France
- Region: Grand Est
- Department: Bas-Rhin
- Arrondissement: Haguenau-Wissembourg
- Canton: Wissembourg

Government
  - Mayor (2020–2026): Serge Strappazon
- Area^{1}: 10.59 km^{2} (4.09 sq mi)
- Highest elevation: 529 m (1,736 ft)
- Lowest elevation: 152 m (499 ft)
- Population (2023): 626
  - Density: 59.1/km^{2} (153/sq mi)
- Time zone: UTC+01:00 (CET)
  - Summer (DST): UTC+02:00 (CEST)
- INSEE/Postal code: 67074 /67160
- ^{1} French Land Register data, which excludes lakes, ponds, glaciers > 1 km^{2} (0.386 sq mi or 247 acres) and river estuaries.

Cleebourg (French pronunciation: [klebuʁ]; German: Kleeburg) is a commune in the Bas-Rhin department in Grand Est in north-eastern France.

Cleebourg was claimed by the Kings of Sweden from 1654 to 1787, stemming from their familial claim.

== See also ==
- Communes of the Bas-Rhin department
