= Riedseltz =

Riedseltz Ridselz
- Commune
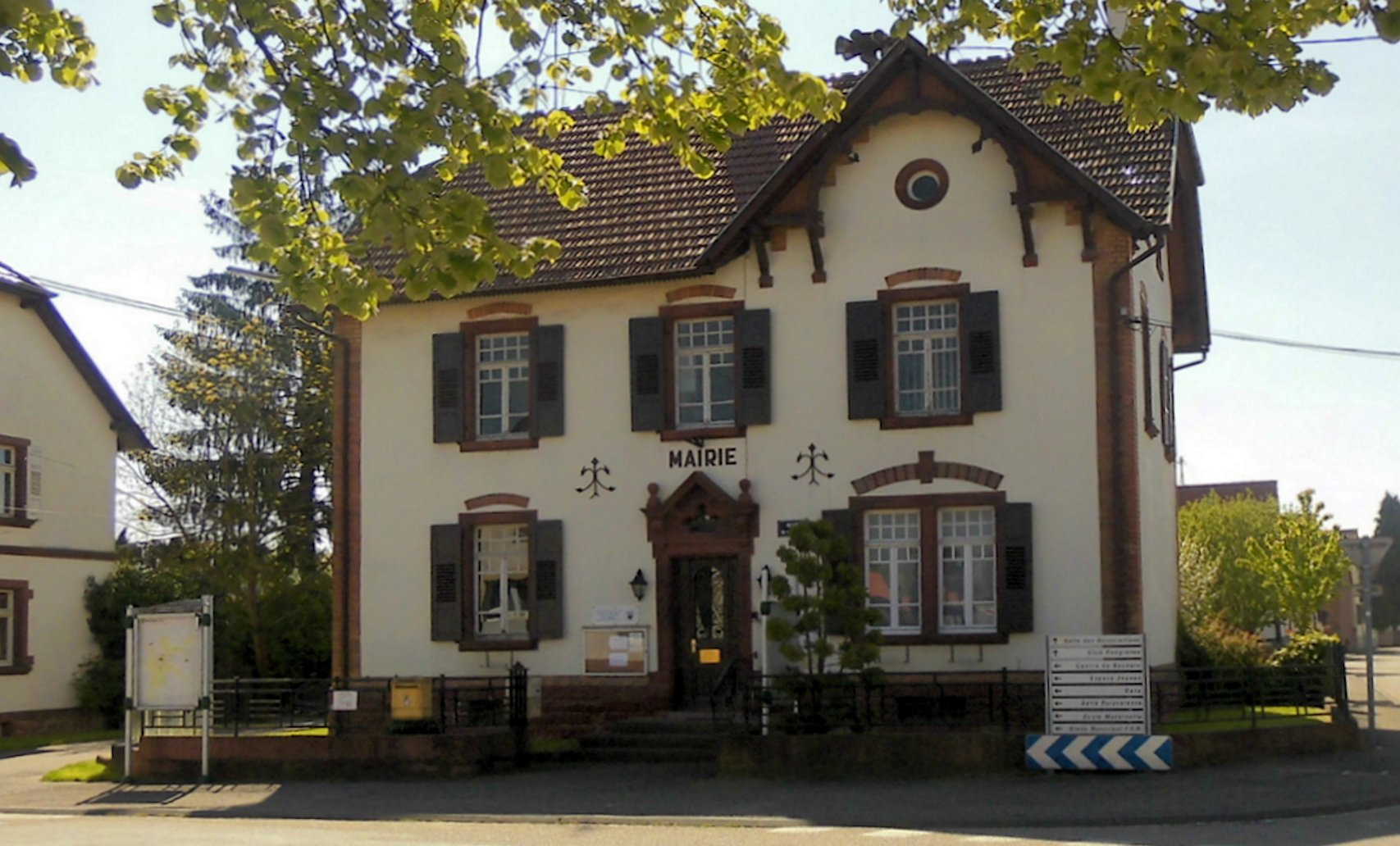
- The town hall in Riedseltz

- Coat of arms
- Location of Riedseltz
- Location within France Location within Grand Est
- Coordinates: 48°59′39″N 7°57′14″E
- Country: France
- Region: Grand Est
- Department: Bas-Rhin
- Arrondissement: Haguenau-Wissembourg
- Canton: Wissembourg

Government
  - Mayor (2020–2026): René Richert
- Area^{1}: 10.02 km^{2} (3.87 sq mi)
- Highest elevation: 218 m (715 ft)
- Lowest elevation: 145 m (476 ft)
- Population (2023): 1,143
  - Density: 114.1/km^{2} (295.4/sq mi)
- Time zone: UTC+01:00 (CET)
  - Summer (DST): UTC+02:00 (CEST)
- INSEE/Postal code: 67400 /67160
- ^{1} French Land Register data, which excludes lakes, ponds, glaciers > 1 km^{2} (0.386 sq mi or 247 acres) and river estuaries.

Riedseltz (German: Riedselz) is a commune in the Bas-Rhin department in Grand Est in north-eastern France.

== See also ==
- Communes of the Bas-Rhin department
