= Seebach, Bas-Rhin =

Seebach Seebàch
- Commune
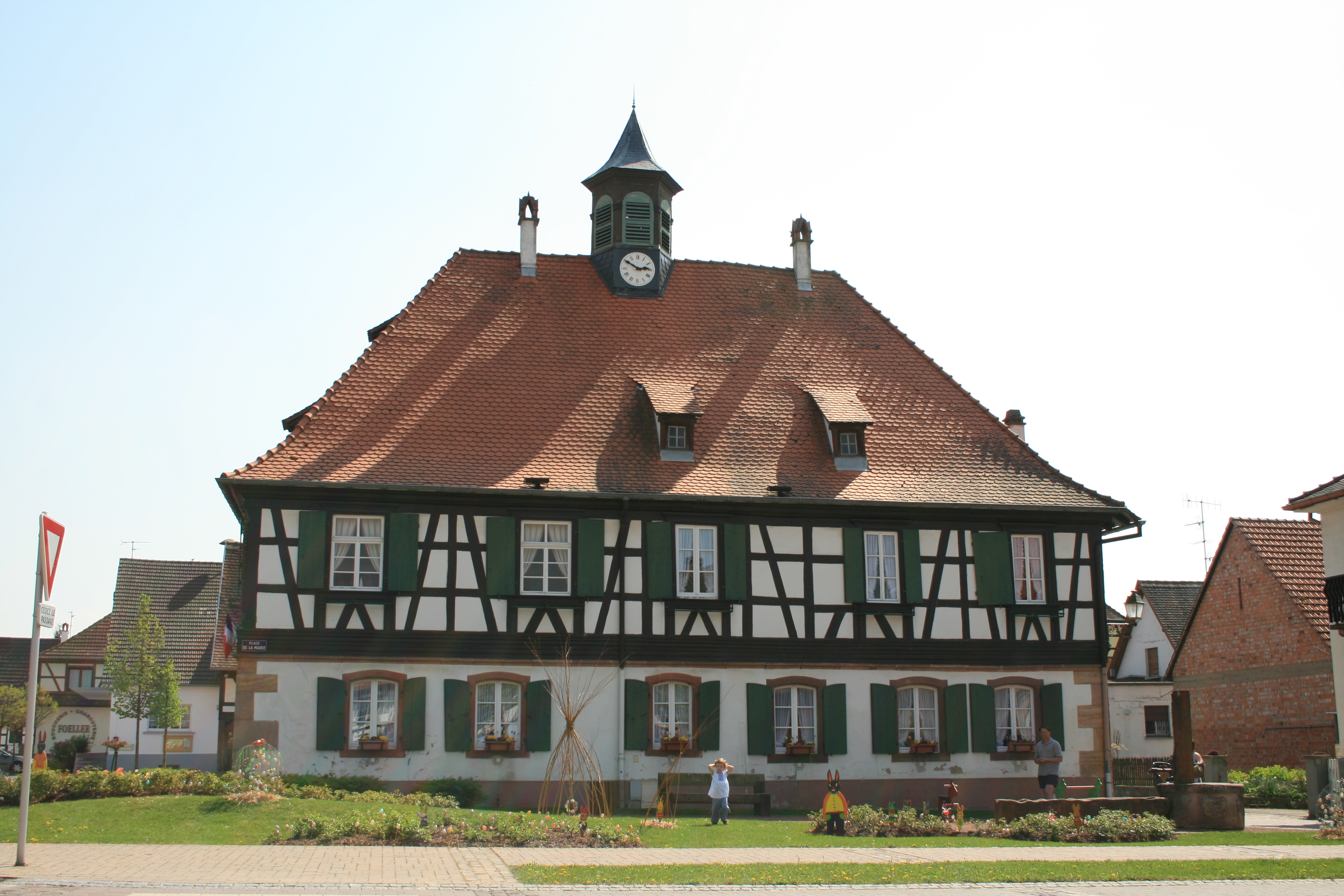
- Town hall

- Coat of arms
- Location of Seebach
- Location within France Location within Grand Est
- Coordinates: 48°58′16″N 7°59′21″E
- Country: France
- Region: Grand Est
- Department: Bas-Rhin
- Arrondissement: Haguenau-Wissembourg
- Canton: Wissembourg

Government
  - Mayor (2020–2026): Michel Lom
- Area^{1}: 17.11 km^{2} (6.61 sq mi)
- Highest elevation: 192 m (630 ft)
- Lowest elevation: 140 m (460 ft)
- Population (2023): 1,616
  - Density: 94.45/km^{2} (244.6/sq mi)
- Time zone: UTC+01:00 (CET)
  - Summer (DST): UTC+02:00 (CEST)
- INSEE/Postal code: 67351 /67160
- ^{1} French Land Register data, which excludes lakes, ponds, glaciers > 1 km^{2} (0.386 sq mi or 247 acres) and river estuaries.

Seebach (French pronunciation: [zebax]) is a commune in the Bas-Rhin department in Grand Est in north-eastern France. It was formed in 1974 by the merger of the former communes Oberseebach and Niederseebach.

== Timber framed houses in Seebach ==
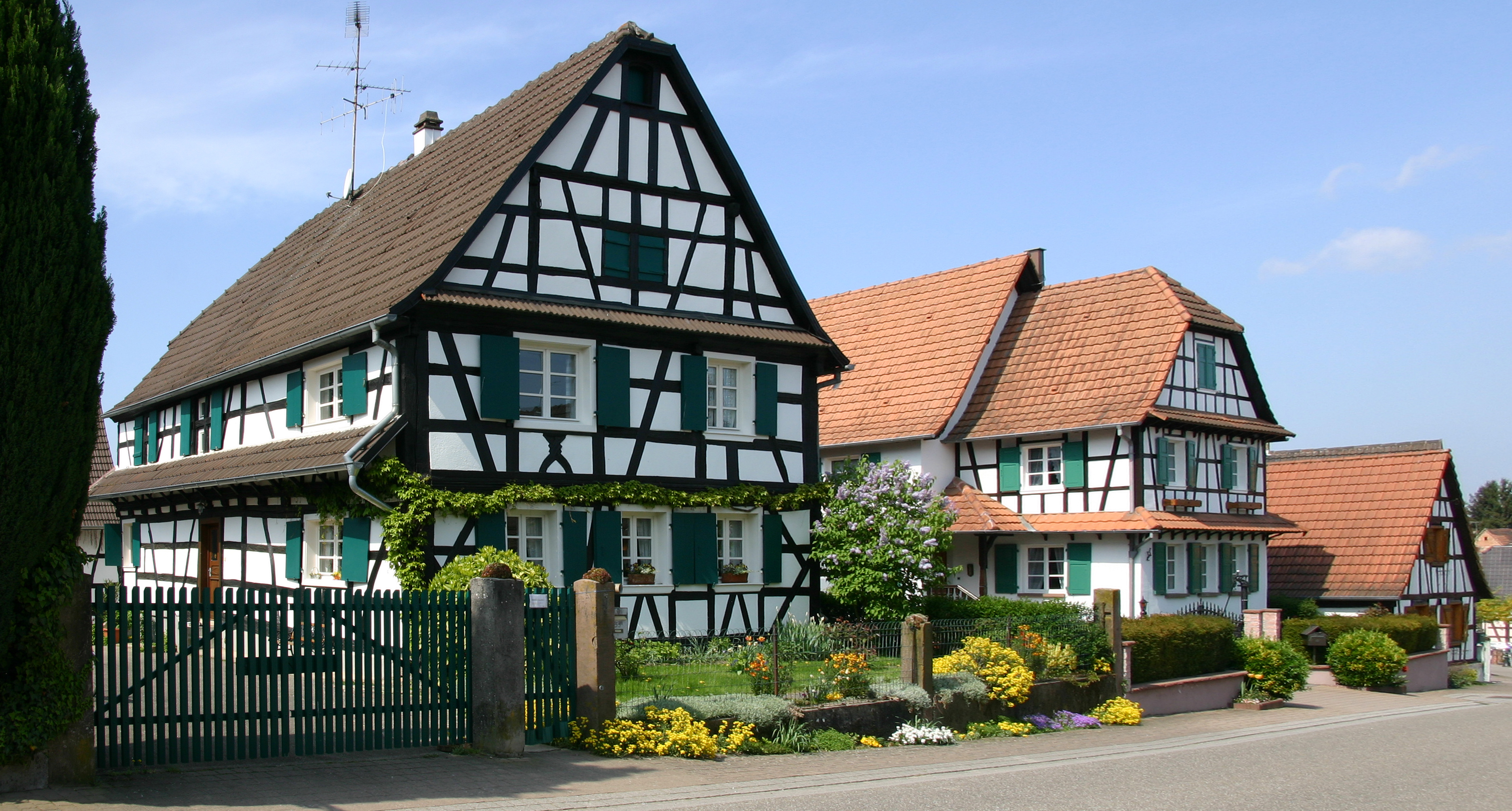

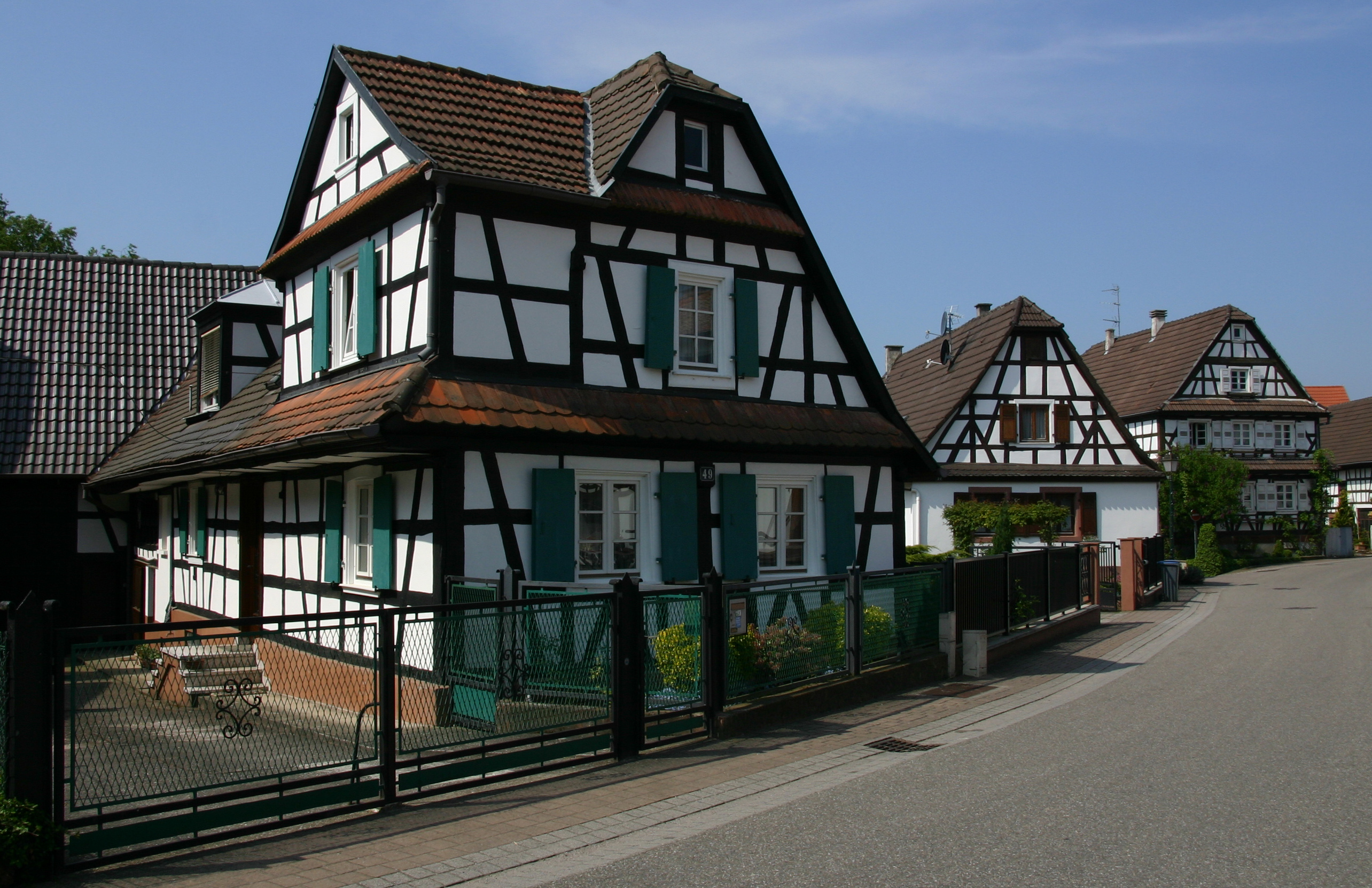

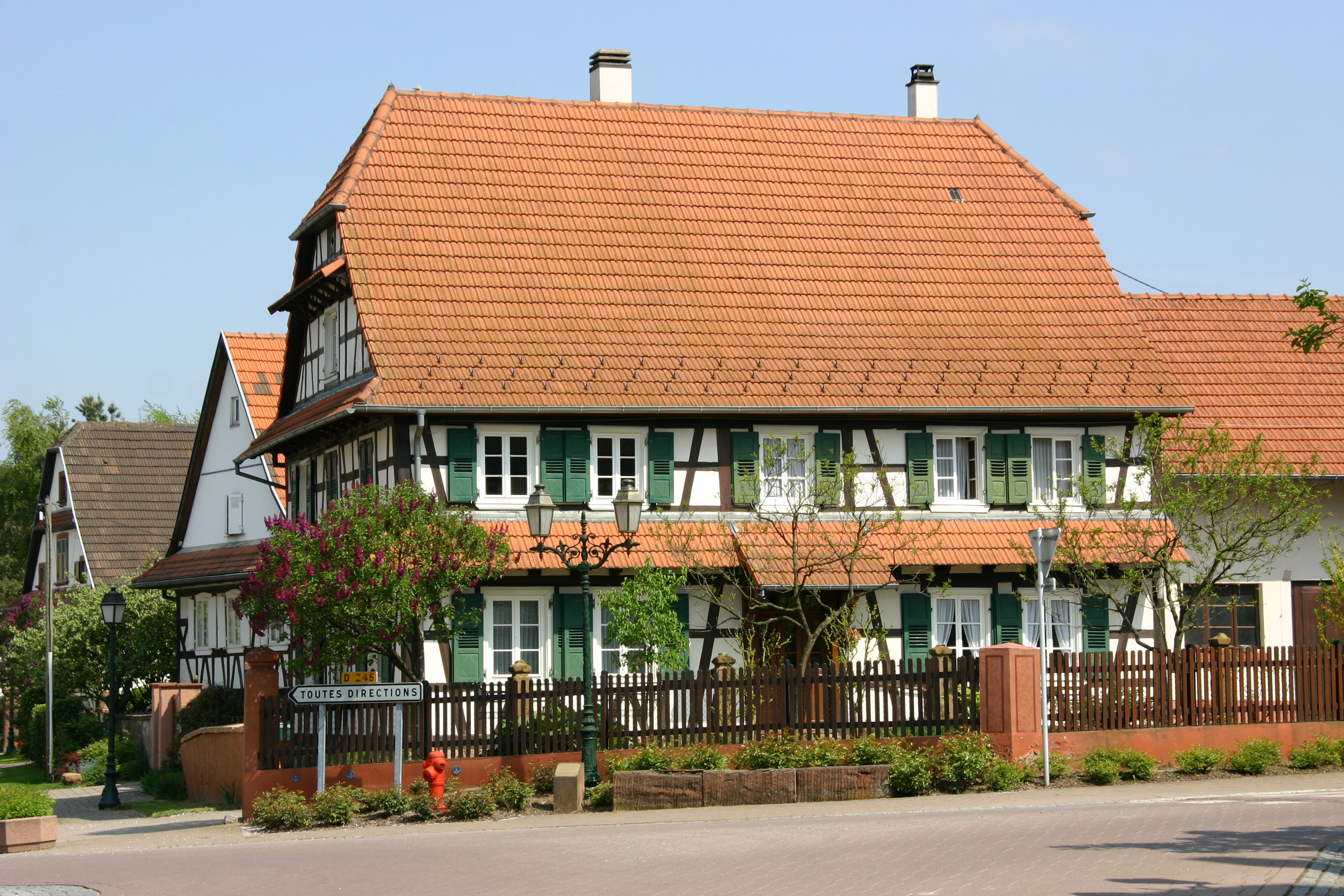

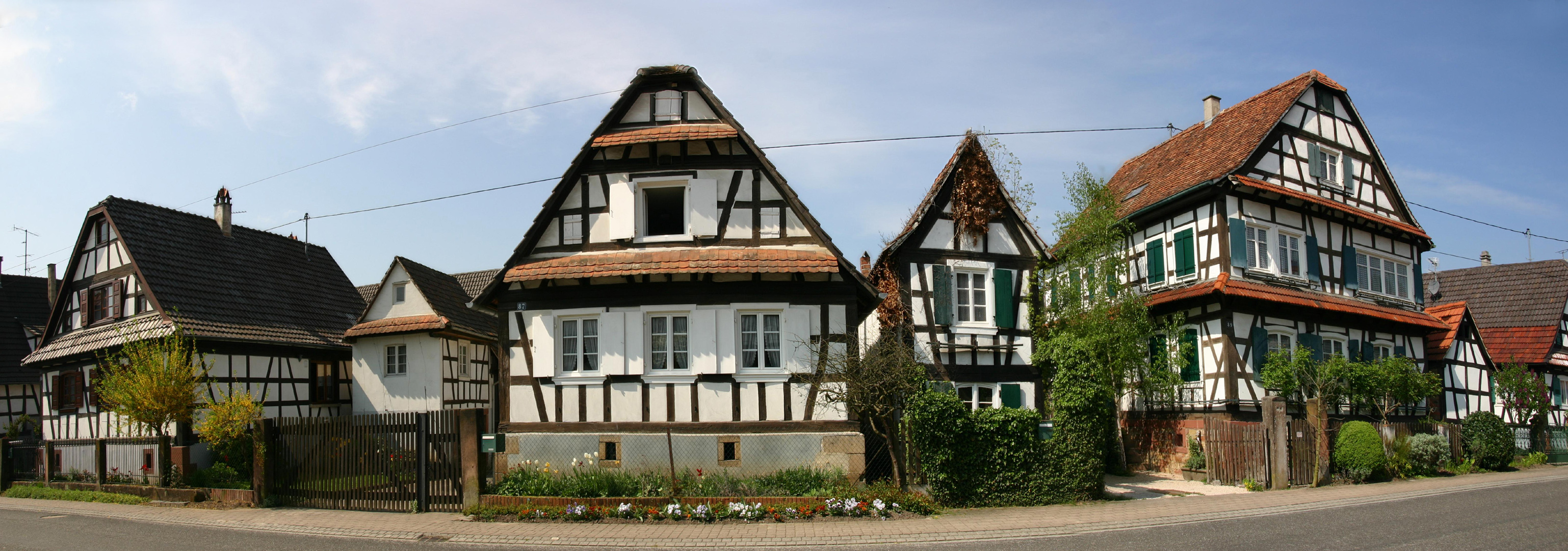

== See also ==
- Communes of the Bas-Rhin department
