= Oberhoffen-lès-Wissembourg =

Oberhoffen-lès-Wissembourg Owerhoffe
- Commune
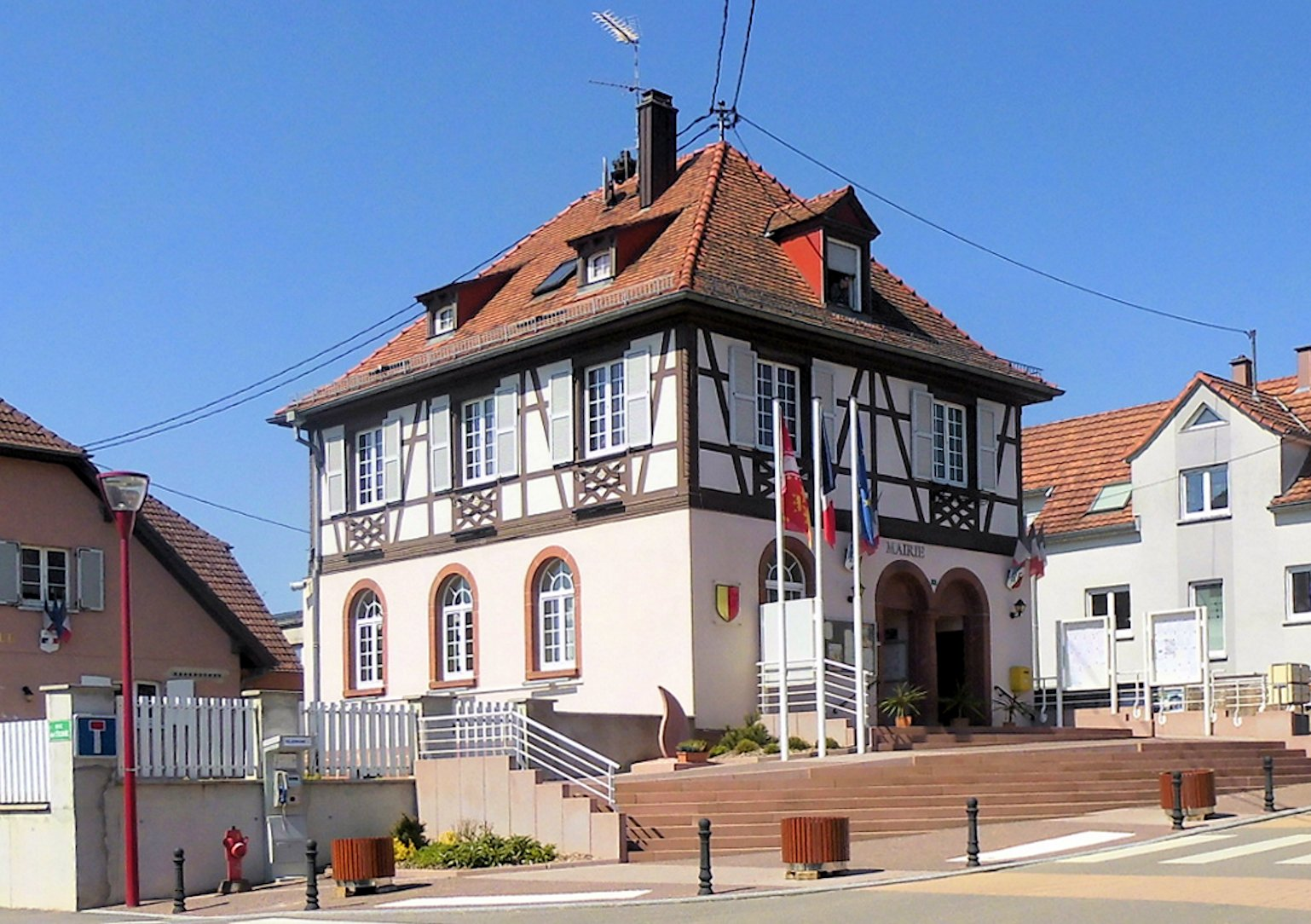
- The town hall in Oberhoffen-lès-Wissembourg

- Coat of arms
- Location of Oberhoffen-lès-Wissembourg
- Location within France Location within Grand Est
- Coordinates: 49°01′02″N 7°55′17″E
- Country: France
- Region: Grand Est
- Department: Bas-Rhin
- Arrondissement: Haguenau-Wissembourg
- Canton: Wissembourg
- Intercommunality: Pays de Wissembourg

Government
  - Mayor (2020–2026): Thomas Hauer
- Area^{1}: 3.03 km^{2} (1.17 sq mi)
- Highest elevation: 251 m (823 ft)
- Lowest elevation: 179 m (587 ft)
- Population (2023): 309
  - Density: 102/km^{2} (264/sq mi)
- Time zone: UTC+01:00 (CET)
  - Summer (DST): UTC+02:00 (CEST)
- INSEE/Postal code: 67344 /67160
- ^{1} French Land Register data, which excludes lakes, ponds, glaciers > 1 km^{2} (0.386 sq mi or 247 acres) and river estuaries.

Oberhoffen-lès-Wissembourg (German: Oberhoffen bei Weißenburg) is a commune in the Bas-Rhin department in Grand Est in north-eastern France.

== Population ==
Historical population
Year	Pop.	±% p.a.
1968	107	—
1975	110	+0.40%
1982	160	+5.50%
1990	201	+2.89%
1999	279	+3.71%
2007	310	+1.33%
2012	323	+0.82%
2017	324	+0.06%
2023	309	−0.79%
Source: INSEE

== See also ==
- Communes of the Bas-Rhin department
