= Arrondissement of Haguenau =

Coordinates: 48.82°N 7.78°E

Haguenau
- Former arrondissement
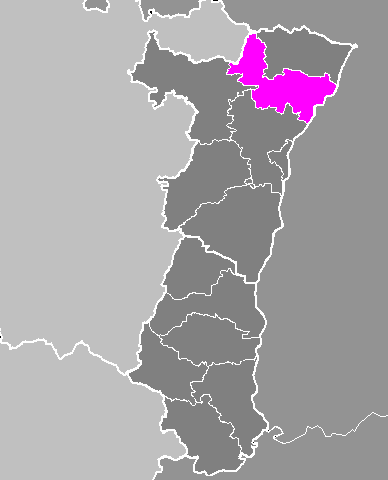
- Location within the former region Alsace
- Country: France
- Region: Grand Est
- Department: Bas-Rhin
- No. of communes: {{{nbcomm}}}
- Disbanded: 2015
- Area: 666 km^{2} (257 sq mi)
- Population (2012): 130,835
  - Density: 196/km^{2} (509/sq mi)

The arrondissement of Haguenau is a former arrondissement of France in the Bas-Rhin department in the Alsace region. In 2015 it was merged into the new arrondissement of Haguenau-Wissembourg. It had 56 communes, and its population was 130,835 (2012).

== Composition ==
The communes of the arrondissement of Haguenau, and their INSEE codes, were:

1. Auenheim (67014)	2. Batzendorf (67023)	3. Berstheim (67035)	4. Bischwiller (67046)
5. Bitschhoffen (67048)	6. Dalhunden (67082)	7. Dambach (67083)	8. Dauendorf (67087)
9. Drusenheim (67106)	10. Engwiller (67123)	11. Forstfeld (67140)	12. Fort-Louis (67142)
13. Gumbrechtshoffen (67174)	14. Gundershoffen (67176)	15. Haguenau (67180)	16. Herrlisheim (67194)
17. Hochstett (67203)	18. Huttendorf (67215)	19. Kaltenhouse (67230)	20. Kauffenheim (67231)
21. Kindwiller (67238)	22. La Walck (67512)	23. Leutenheim (67264)	24. Mertzwiller (67291)
25. Mietesheim (67292)	26. Morschwiller (67304)	27. Neuhaeusel (67319)	28. Niederbronn-les-Bains (67324)
29. Niederschaeffolsheim (67331)	30. Oberbronn (67340)	31. Oberhoffen-sur-Moder (67345)	32. Offendorf (67356)
33. Offwiller (67358)	34. Ohlungen (67359)	35. Reichshoffen (67388)	36. Rœschwoog (67405)
37. Rohrwiller (67407)	38. Roppenheim (67409)	39. Rothbach (67415)	40. Rountzenheim (67418)
41. Schirrhein (67449)	42. Schirrhoffen (67450)	43. Schweighouse-sur-Moder (67458)	44. Sessenheim (67465)
45. Soufflenheim (67472)	46. Stattmatten (67476)	47. Uberach (67496)	48. Uhlwiller (67497)
49. Uhrwiller (67498)	50. Uttenhoffen (67502)	51. Wahlenheim (67510)	52. Weitbruch (67523)
53. Windstein (67536)	54. Wintershouse (67540)	55. Wittersheim (67546)	56. Zinswiller (67558)

== History ==
The arrondissement of Haguenau was created in 1919. It was disbanded in 2015. As a result of the reorganisation of the cantons of France which came into effect in 2015, the borders of the cantons are no longer related to the borders of the arrondissements. The cantons of the arrondissement of Haguenau were, as of January 2015:

1. Bischwiller
2. Haguenau
3. Niederbronn-les-Bains
