= List of imperial villages =

This is a list of all of the known imperial villages, the smallest immediate constituents of the Holy Roman Empire.

== B ==
- Billigheim
- Birkweiler
- Bubenheim (part of the Ingelheim Grant)
- Burgholzhausen vor der Höhe

== D ==
- Dangolsheim
- Daxweiler (part of the Ingelheim Grant)
- Dexheim

== E ==
- Eglofs
- Elsheim (part of the Ingelheim Grant)
- Erlenbach
- Eschbach

== F ==
- Freisbach
- Frei-Weinheim (part of the Ingelheim Grant)

== G ==
- Gebsattel
- Ginsheim-Gustavsburg
- Geboltsheim (Reichsweiler or Imperial Hamlet)
- Gochsheim
- Gommersheim
- Gotramstein
- Grassendorf
- Grosswinternheim (part of the Ingelheim Grant)
- Gunstett

== H ==
- Hochstett
- Hohenstaufen
- Holzhausen
- Horrheim
- Huttendorf

== I ==
- Impflingen
- Ingelheim Grant (Ingelheimer Grund)

== K ==
- Kallstadt
- Keffendorf (Reichsweiler or Imperial Hamlet)
- Kindwiller
- Klingen
- Kreuznach
- Kriegsheim
- Küttolsheim

== L ==
- The Free Men of the Leutkircher Heath
- Lixhausen

== M ==
- Melbach
- Minversheim
- Mittelschäffolsheim
- Mommenheim
- Möntenich
- Morschweiler
- Mutzenhausen

== N ==
- Nieder-Ingelheim (part of the Ingelheim Grant)
- Niederschäffolsheim
- Nierstein

== O ==
- Oberdachstetten
- Ockstadt
- Ober-Ingelheim (part of the Ingelheim Grant)
- Ohlungen

== P ==
- Pfändhausen

== R ==
- The Reichstal of the Harmersbach
- Ringeldorf
- Rohrbach
- Rottelsheim
- Rumersheim (Reichsweiler or Imperial hamlet)

== S ==
- Schwabenheim an der Selz (part of the Ingelheim Grant)
- Scherlenheim
- Sennfeld
- Soden
- Stadecken-Elsheim
- Steinweiler
- Sufflenheim
- Sulzbach
- Surburg

== U ==
- Überach

== W ==
- Wackernheim (part of the Ingelheim Grant)
- Wahlenheim
- Walk
- Wiesbach
- Wingersheim
- Wintershausen
- Wittersheim
