= Oscar Heisserer =

French footballer (1914–2004)

Personal information
- Date of birth: 18 July 1914
- Place of birth: Schirrhein, German Empire
- Date of death: 7 October 2004 (aged 90)
- Place of death: Strasbourg, France
- Height: 1.70 m (5 ft 7 in)
- Position: Midfielder

Youth career
- –1934: Bischwiller

Senior career*
Years	Team	Apps	(Gls)
1934–1938	Strasbourg		
1938–1945	RC Paris		
1945–1949	Strasbourg		
1949–1952	Lyon		

International career
1936–1948	France	25	(8)

Managerial career
- 1939–1941: Strasbourg
- 1949–12/1954: Lyon
- 1955–1956: Strasbourg
- ?–?: SR Colmar
- * Club domestic league appearances and goals

Oscar Heisserer (18 July 1914 – 7 October 2004) was a French footballer. Born in Schirrhein, Alsace-Lorraine, he played as a midfielder for RC Strasbourg, and appeared for France in the 1938 World Cup, where he scored a goal. He died in Strasbourg.
