= Niedermodern =

Niedermodern Nìdermodere
- Commune
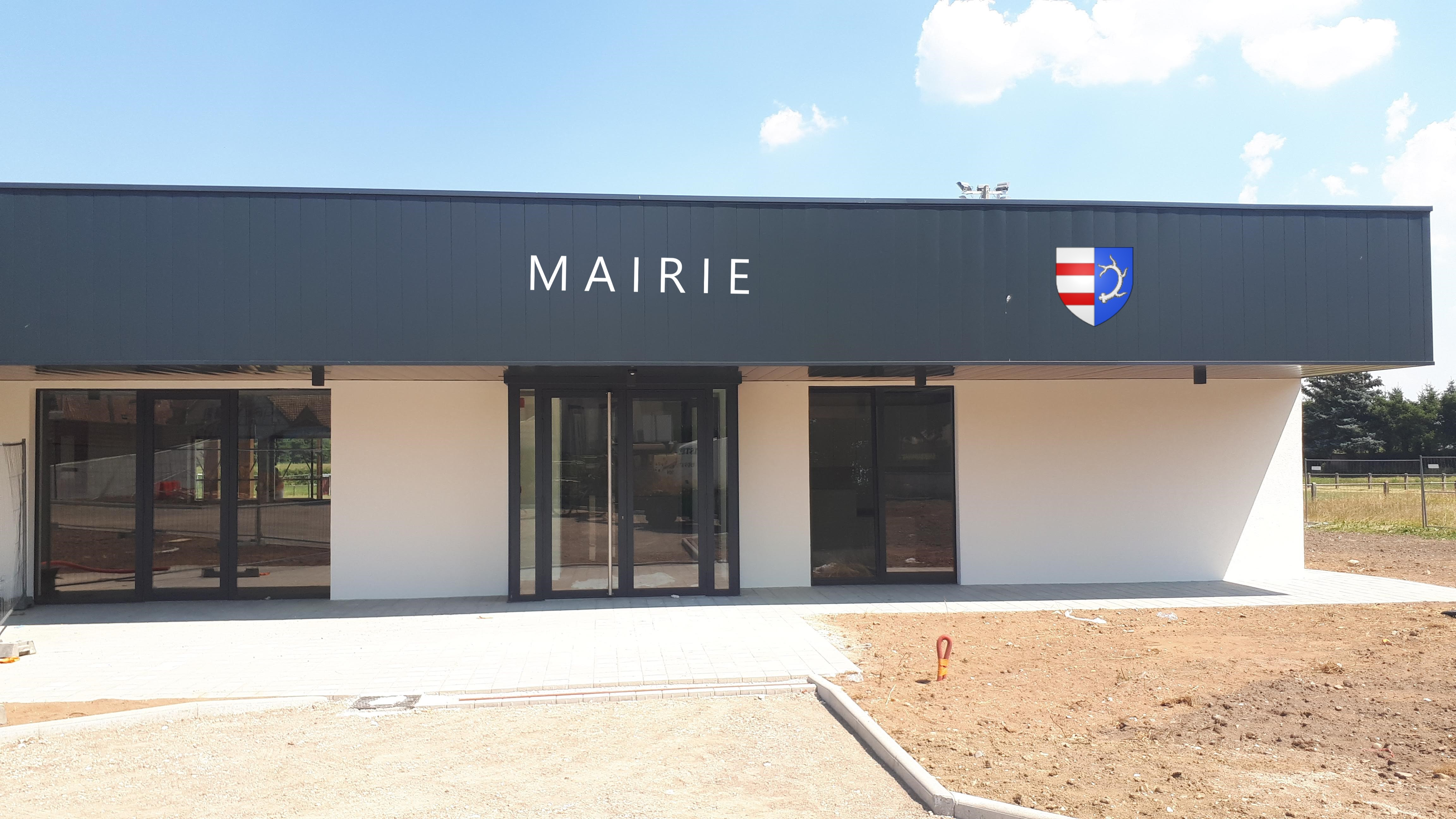
- The town hall in Niedermodern

- Coat of arms
- Location of Niedermodern
- Location within France Location within Grand Est
- Coordinates: 48°50′46″N 7°37′37″E
- Country: France
- Region: Grand Est
- Department: Bas-Rhin
- Arrondissement: Haguenau-Wissembourg
- Canton: Reichshoffen
- Intercommunality: CA Haguenau

Government
  - Mayor (2020–2026): Dorothée Krieger
- Area^{1}: 4.39 km^{2} (1.69 sq mi)
- Highest elevation: 262 m (860 ft)
- Lowest elevation: 157 m (515 ft)
- Population (2023): 913
  - Density: 208/km^{2} (539/sq mi)
- Time zone: UTC+01:00 (CET)
  - Summer (DST): UTC+02:00 (CEST)
- INSEE/Postal code: 67328 /67350
- ^{1} French Land Register data, which excludes lakes, ponds, glaciers > 1 km^{2} (0.386 sq mi or 247 acres) and river estuaries.

Niedermodern is a commune in the Bas-Rhin department in Grand Est in north-eastern France.

== See also ==
- Communes of the Bas-Rhin department
