= Communauté d'agglomération de Haguenau =

Communauté d'agglomération in Bas-Rhin, France

- Communauté d'agglomération
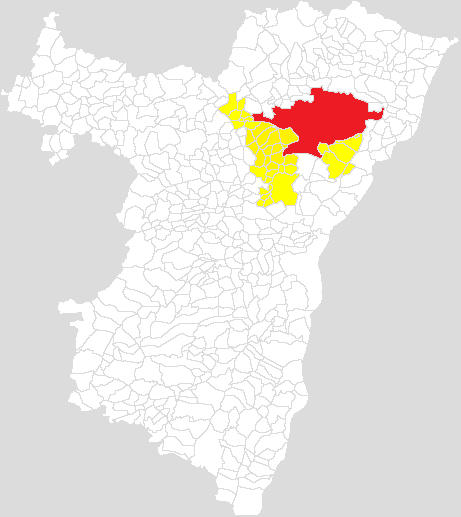
- Country: France
- Region: Grand Est
- Department: Bas-Rhin
- No. of communes: {{{nbcomm}}}
- Established: 1 January 2017

Government
  - President (2020–2026): Claude Sturni (DVD)
- Area: 399.23 km^{2} (154.14 sq mi)
- Population (2021): 98,638
  - Density: 247.07/km^{2} (639.91/sq mi)

The communauté d'agglomération de Hagenau (CAH) is a communauté d'agglomération situated in the Bas-Rhin department and the Grand Est region of France. It's part of the pôle métropolitain d'Alsace, a federation of large Alsacian intercommunalities.

Created 1 January 2017, it's composed of 36 communes with a population of close to 99,000 residents and seated in Haguenau. Since 9 January 2017, Claude Sturni has been president of the communauté d'agglomération.

== Composition ==
On 1 January 2021, the communauté d'agglomération de Haguenau was composed of 98,638 residents in 36 communes over a geographic area of 399.2 km^{2}.

List of communes in the communauté d'agglomération de Haguenau
Name	Code INSEE	Demonym	Area (km^{2})	Population (2017)	Density (per km^{2})
Haguenau (seat)	67180	Haguenoviens	182.59	34,504	189
Batzendorf	67023	Batzendorfois	6.74	988	147
Bernolsheim	67033	Bernolsheimois	3.39	602	178
Berstheim	67035	Berstheimois	3.09	437	141
Bilwisheim	67039	Bilwisheimois	2.56	467	182
Bischwiller	67046	Bischwillérois	17.25	12,538	727
Bitschhoffen	67048	Bitschhoffenois	2.54	459	181
Brumath	67067	Brumathois	29.54	9,986	338
Dauendorf	67087	Dauendorfois	7.63	1,440	189
Donnenheim	67100	Donnenheimois	3.76	349	93
Engwiller	67123	Engwillerois	3.74	501	134
Hochstett	67203	Hochstettois	2.13	373	175
Huttendorf	67215	Huttendorfois	4.4	505	115
Kaltenhouse	67230	Kaltenhousiens	3.72	2,333	627
Kindwiller	67238	Kindwillerois	5.97	637	107
Krautwiller	67249	Krautwillerois	1.48	255	172
Kriegsheim	67250	Kriegsheimois	3.93	781	199
Mittelschaeffolsheim	67298	Mittelschaeffolsheimois	2.64	576	218
Mommenheim	67301	Mommenheimois	8.16	1,897	232
Morschwiller	67304	Morschwillerois	4.62	587	127
Niedermodern	67328	Niedermodernois	4.39	913	208
Niederschaeffolsheim	67331	Niederschaeffolsheimois	6.24	1,374	220
Oberhoffen-sur-Moder	67345	Oberhoffenois	14.25	3,486	245
Ohlungen	67359	Ohlungeois	8.39	1,308	156
Olwisheim	67361	Olwisheimois	2.96	498	168
Rohrwiller	67407	Rohrwillerois	2.95	1,634	554
Rottelsheim	67417	Rottelsheimois	2.39	307	128
Schirrhein	67449	Schirrheinois	6.49	2,227	343
Schirrhoffen	67450	Schirrhoffenois	0.63	694	1,102
Schweighouse-sur-Moder	67458	Schweighousiens	9.91	4 939	498
Uhlwiller	67497	Uhlwillerois	7.46	688	92
Uhrwiller	67498	Uhrwillerois	11.02	706	64
Val-de-Moder	67372		9.01	5,096	566
Wahlenheim	67510	Wahlenheimois	2.55	478	187
Wintershouse	67540	Wintershousiens	3.66	894	244
Wittersheim	67546	Wittersheimois	7.05	661	94

== Administration ==
=== President ===
List of successive President's of the communauté d'agglomération de Haguenau
In office		Name	Party	Capacity	Ref.
9 January 2017	Incumbent	Claude Sturni	DVD	Mayor of Haguenau (2008–present); Deputy for Bas-Rhin's 9th constituency (2012–2017)	
