= Dauendorf =

- Commune
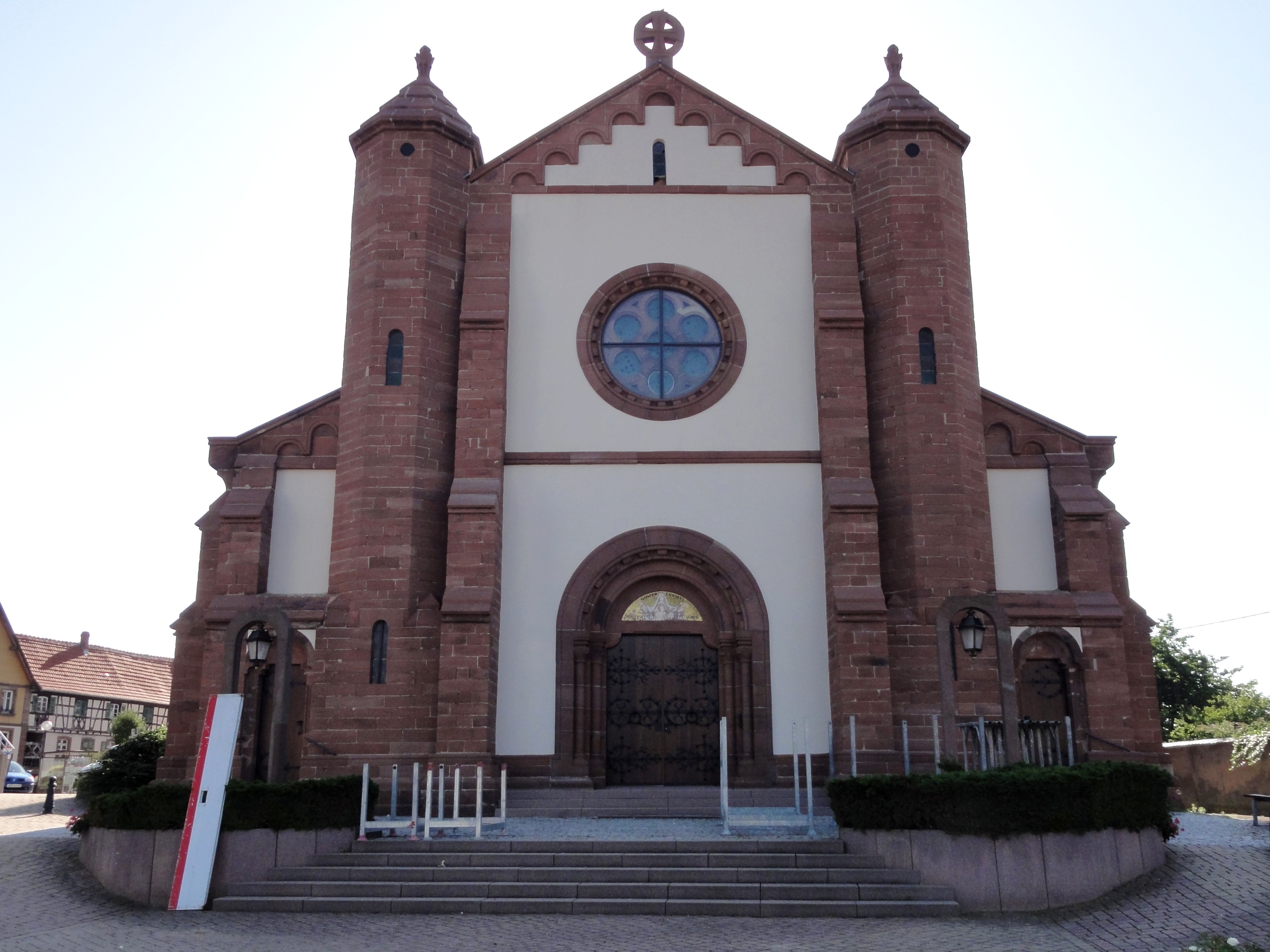
- The church in Dauendorf

- Coat of arms
- Location of Dauendorf
- Location within France Location within Grand Est
- Coordinates: 48°49′51″N 7°39′21″E
- Country: France
- Region: Grand Est
- Department: Bas-Rhin
- Arrondissement: Haguenau-Wissembourg
- Canton: Haguenau
- Intercommunality: CA Haguenau

Government
  - Mayor (2020–2026): Claude Bebon
- Area^{1}: 7.63 km^{2} (2.95 sq mi)
- Highest elevation: 270 m (890 ft)
- Lowest elevation: 153 m (502 ft)
- Population (2023): 1,418
  - Density: 186/km^{2} (481/sq mi)
- Time zone: UTC+01:00 (CET)
  - Summer (DST): UTC+02:00 (CEST)
- INSEE/Postal code: 67087 /67350
- ^{1} French Land Register data, which excludes lakes, ponds, glaciers > 1 km^{2} (0.386 sq mi or 247 acres) and river estuaries.

Dauendorf (French pronunciation: [dauəndɔʁf]) is a commune in the Bas-Rhin department in the European Collectivity of Alsace, in the Grand Est region of France.

It is the site of the remains of Neubourg Abbey, a former Cistercian monastery, destroyed during the French Revolution.

== Geography ==
The commune of Dauendorf is located around 7.5 miles from Haguenau and around 21.7 miles from Strasbourg. The river Moder runs through the commune.

=== Climate ===
For the period 1991–2020, the average annual temperature recorded by the nearest weather station in the commune of Uhrwiller, 5 miles away as the crow flies, was 10.9 °C and the average annual rainfall was 740mm.

The highest temperature recorded at this station was 38.7 °C on August 7, 2015; the lowest temperature was −18 °C on December 20, 2009.

== See also ==
- Communes of the Bas-Rhin department
