= Neubourg Abbey =

Abbey in Bas-Rhin, France

Coordinates: 48°50′00″N 7°41′00″E

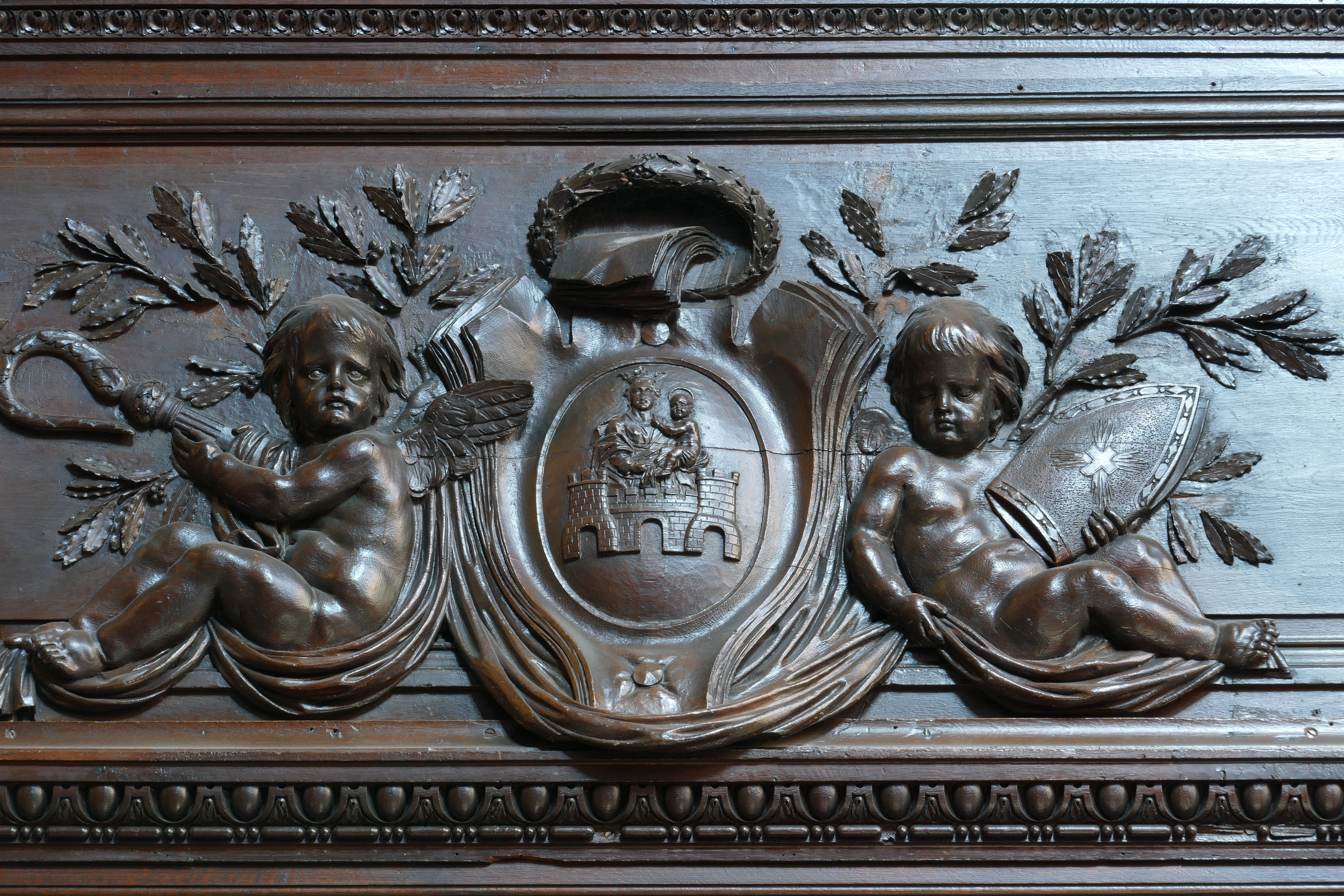
Coat of arms of the abbey on Baroque panelling, now in St Nicholas' Church, Haguenau

Neubourg Abbey (French: Abbaye de Neubourg or du Neubourg; German: Kloster Neuburg; Latin: Novum Castrum) is a former Cistercian monastery in Alsace, France, in Dauendorf, about 9 km west of Haguenau in the Bas-Rhin department.

== History ==
Neubourg Abbey was founded not earlier than 1130 and not later than 1133 by Count Reinhold of Lützelburg as a daughter house of Lützel Abbey of the filiation of Morimond; it was also settled by monks from Lützel. In its turn Neubourg was the mother house of Maulbronn Abbey and Herrenalb Abbey, both founded in 1147.

Between the 14th and 17th centuries the abbey was destroyed and rebuilt several times. It was suppressed in 1790 during the French Revolution.

== Inquisition ==
Not long after it was founded, the abbey was the subject of an inquisition by Frederick Barbarossa, who forced the monks to renounce their claims to the valuable Hohenstaufen Forest.

== Buildings ==
The church was dedicated in 1158. It was rebuilt in 1758, but was entirely destroyed in 1818 along with virtually all of the monastic building complex. There are very few remains: a Baroque gatehouse of 1744; a mill; and part of the precinct wall. Some rococo items from the abbey church (the choir stalls, the organ case, statues of saints) are to be found in the nearby St. Nicholas' church, Haguenau.

== Sundial ==
The abbey possessed a unique 24-faced gnomonic 18th-century sundial, which was relocated to Mont Sainte-Odile Abbey in 1935.

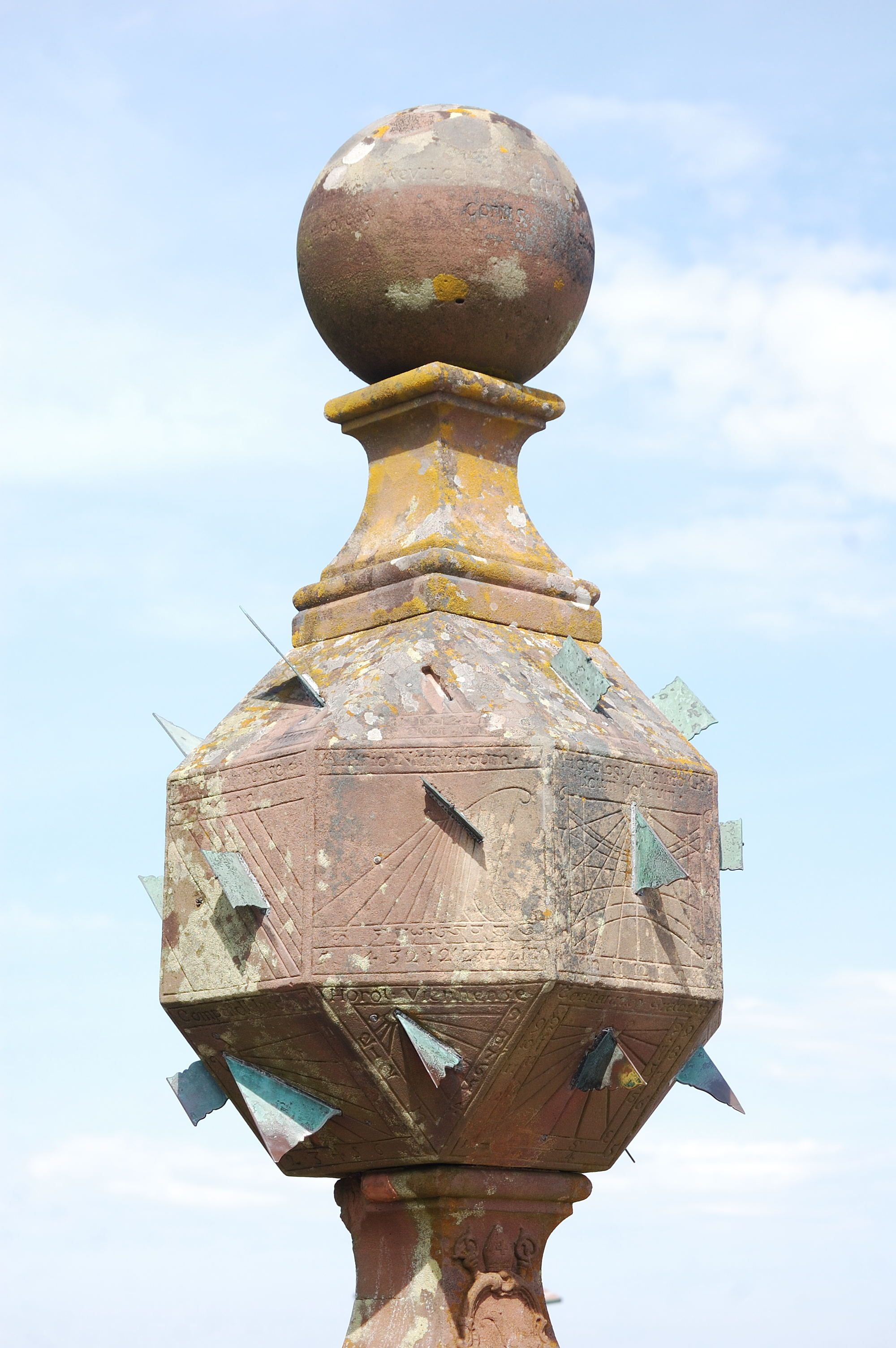
Sundial, now at Mont Sainte-Odile Abbey

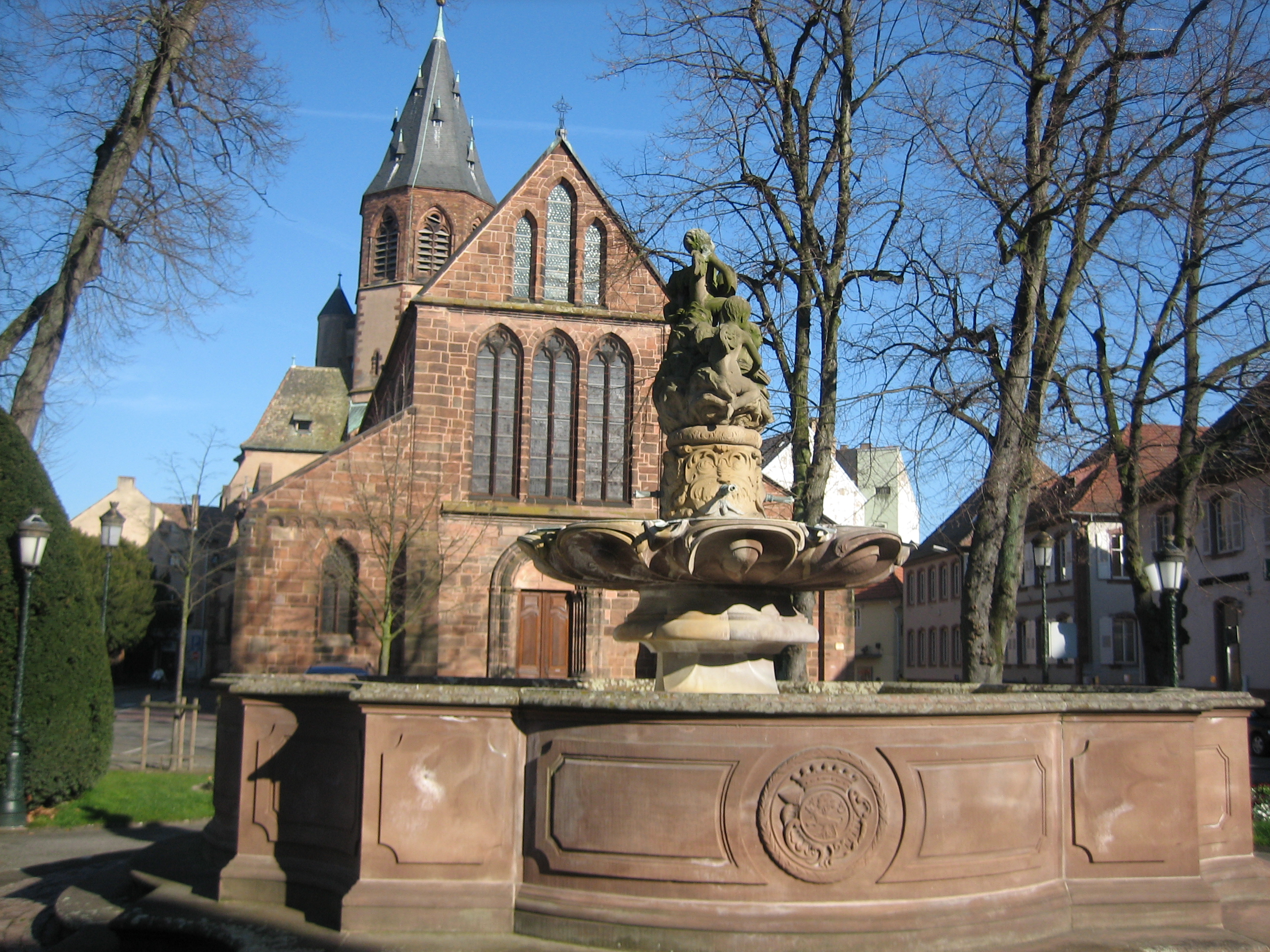
Fountain

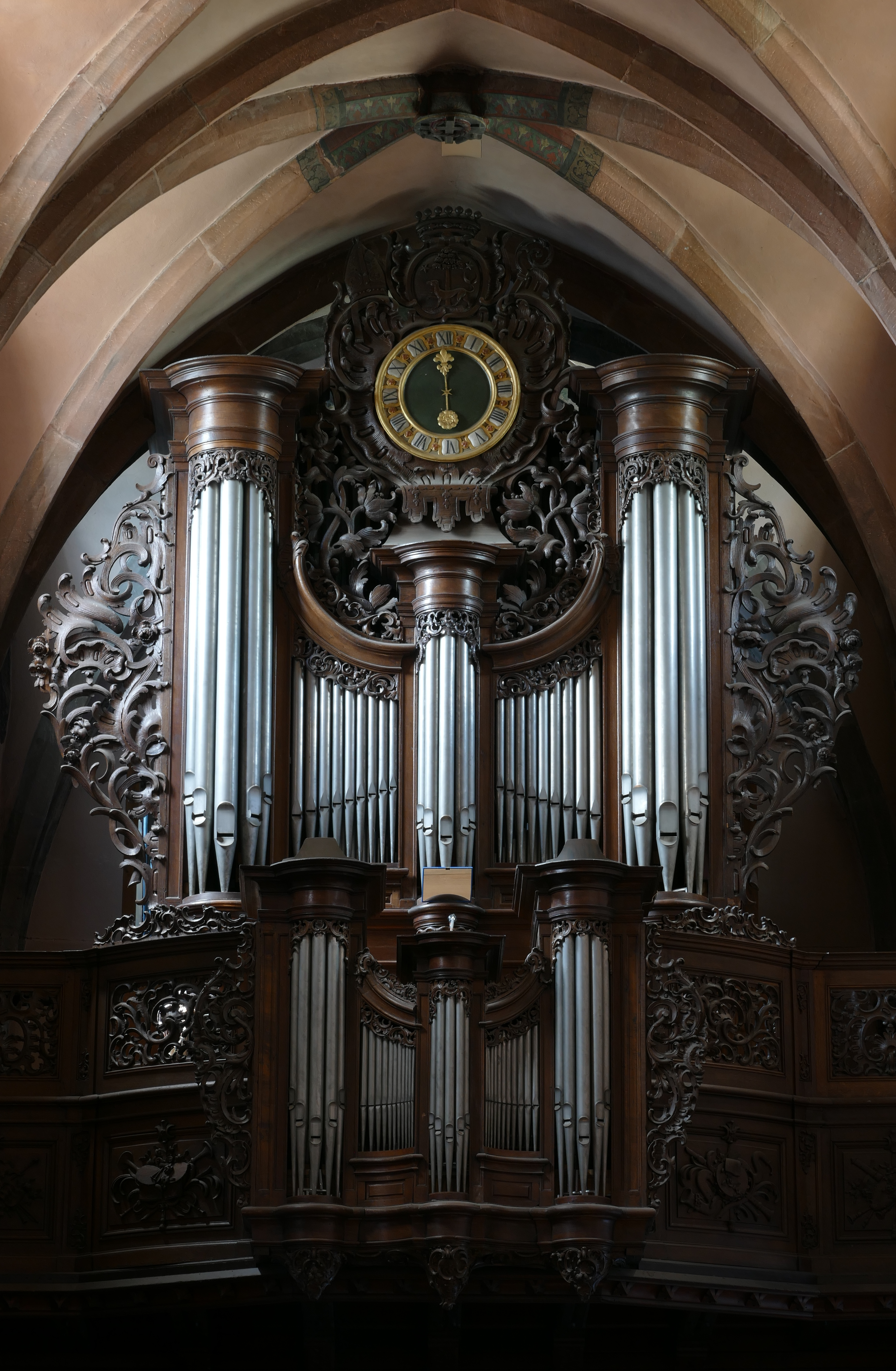
Organ case
