= Schweighouse-sur-Moder =

- Commune
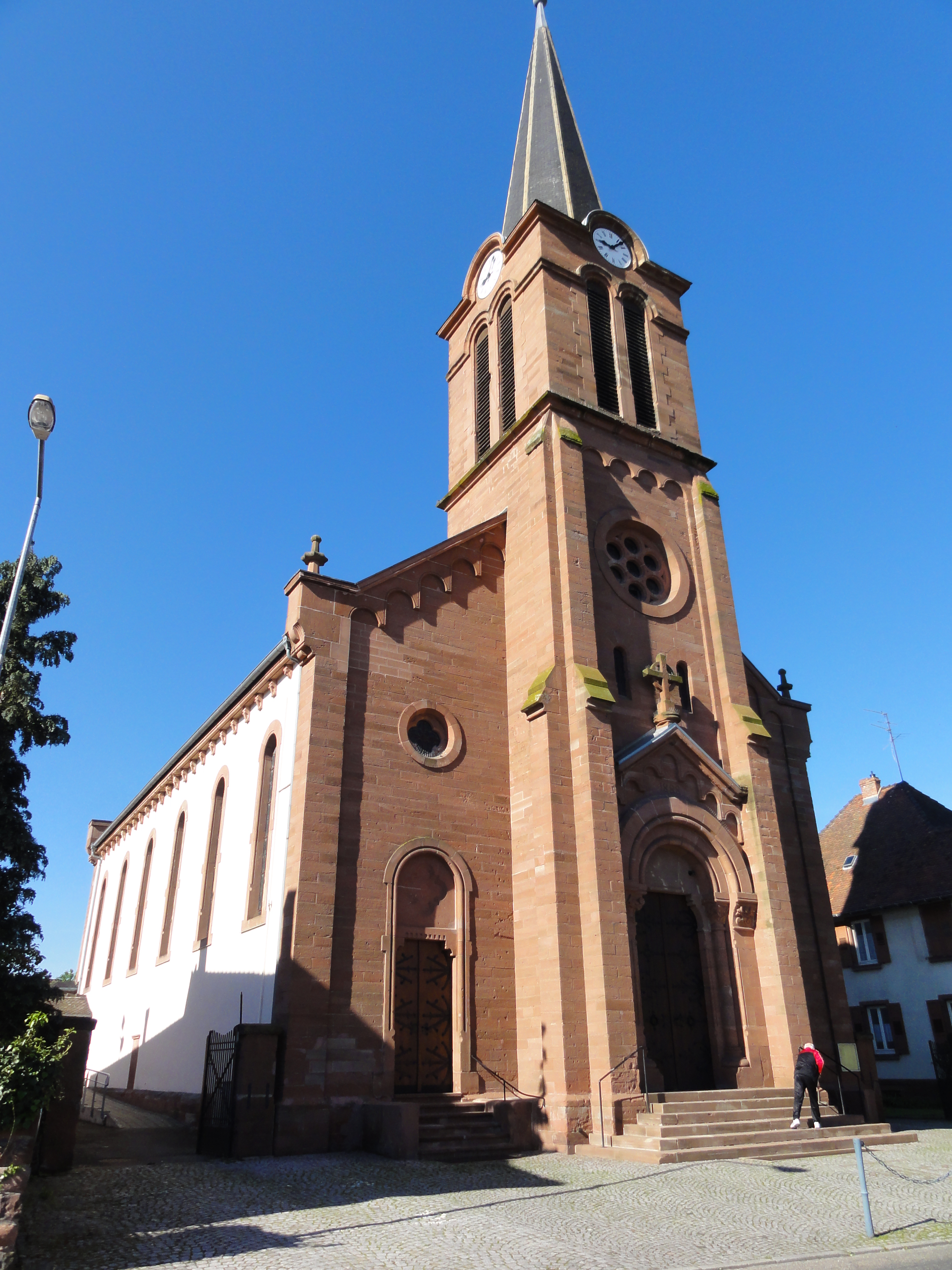
- The church in Schweighouse-sur-Moder

- Coat of arms
- Location of Schweighouse-sur-Moder
- Location within France Location within Grand Est
- Coordinates: 48°49′N 7°44′E
- Country: France
- Region: Grand Est
- Department: Bas-Rhin
- Arrondissement: Haguenau-Wissembourg
- Canton: Haguenau
- Intercommunality: CA Haguenau

Government
  - Mayor (2020–2026): Philippe Specht
- Area^{1}: 9.91 km^{2} (3.83 sq mi)
- Elevation: 158.5 m (520 ft)
- Highest elevation: 174 m (571 ft)
- Lowest elevation: 143 m (469 ft)
- Population (2023): 5,182
  - Density: 523/km^{2} (1,350/sq mi)
- Time zone: UTC+01:00 (CET)
  - Summer (DST): UTC+02:00 (CEST)
- INSEE/Postal code: 67458 /67590
- ^{1} French Land Register data, which excludes lakes, ponds, glaciers > 1 km^{2} (0.386 sq mi or 247 acres) and river estuaries.

Schweighouse-sur-Moder (French pronunciation: [ʃvajɡuz syʁ mɔdɛʁ], lit. 'Schweighouse on Moder'; German: Schweighausen) is a commune in the Bas-Rhin department in Grand Est in north-eastern France.

The name of the commune was officially changed from Schweighausen to Schweighouse-sur-Moder in September 1949.

== Population ==
Historical population
Year	Pop.	±% p.a.
1968	3,203	—
1975	3,813	+2.52%
1982	4,134	+1.16%
1990	4,354	+0.65%
1999	4,595	+0.60%
2007	4,559	−0.10%
2012	4,911	+1.50%
2017	4,939	+0.11%
2023	5,182	+0.80%
Source: INSEE

== Twin towns ==
Schweighouse-sur-Moder is twinned with:

- Marano Lagunare, Italy

== See also ==
- Communes of the Bas-Rhin department
