= Engwiller =

Engwiller Angwìller
- Commune
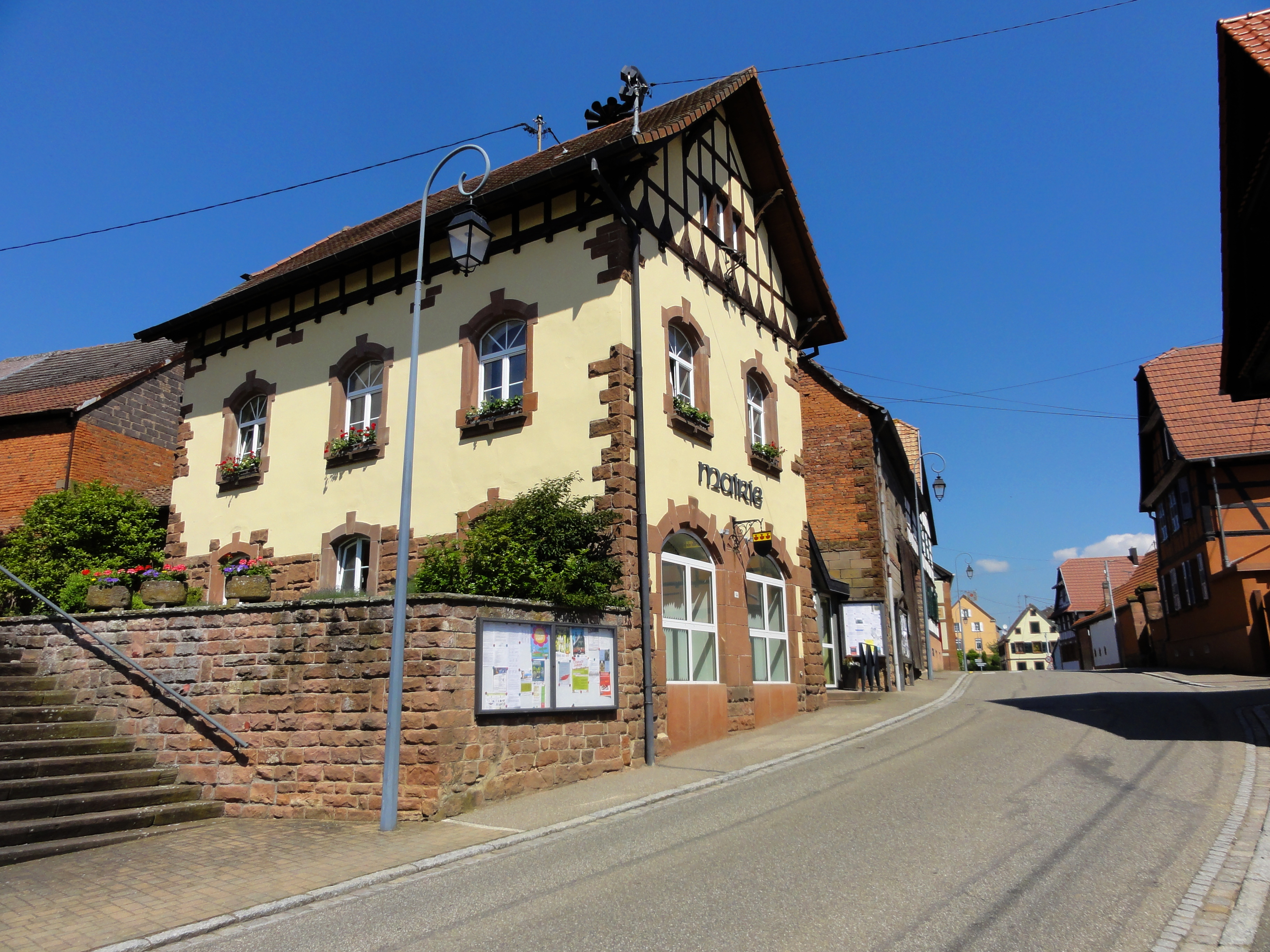
- The town hall in Engwiller

- Coat of arms
- Location of Engwiller
- Location within France Location within Grand Est
- Coordinates: 48°53′08″N 7°36′58″E
- Country: France
- Region: Grand Est
- Department: Bas-Rhin
- Arrondissement: Haguenau-Wissembourg
- Canton: Reichshoffen
- Intercommunality: CA Haguenau

Government
  - Mayor (2020–2026): Jean-Luc Leonhard
- Area^{1}: 3.74 km^{2} (1.44 sq mi)
- Highest elevation: 271 m (889 ft)
- Lowest elevation: 187 m (614 ft)
- Population (2023): 465
  - Density: 124/km^{2} (322/sq mi)
- Time zone: UTC+01:00 (CET)
  - Summer (DST): UTC+02:00 (CEST)
- INSEE/Postal code: 67123 /67350
- ^{1} French Land Register data, which excludes lakes, ponds, glaciers > 1 km^{2} (0.386 sq mi or 247 acres) and river estuaries.

Engwiller (French pronunciation: [ɛŋvilɛʁ]; German: Engweiler) is a commune that is located in the Bas-Rhin department, in Grand Est in northeastern France.

== See also ==
- Communes of the Bas-Rhin department
