= Mittelschaeffolsheim =

- Commune
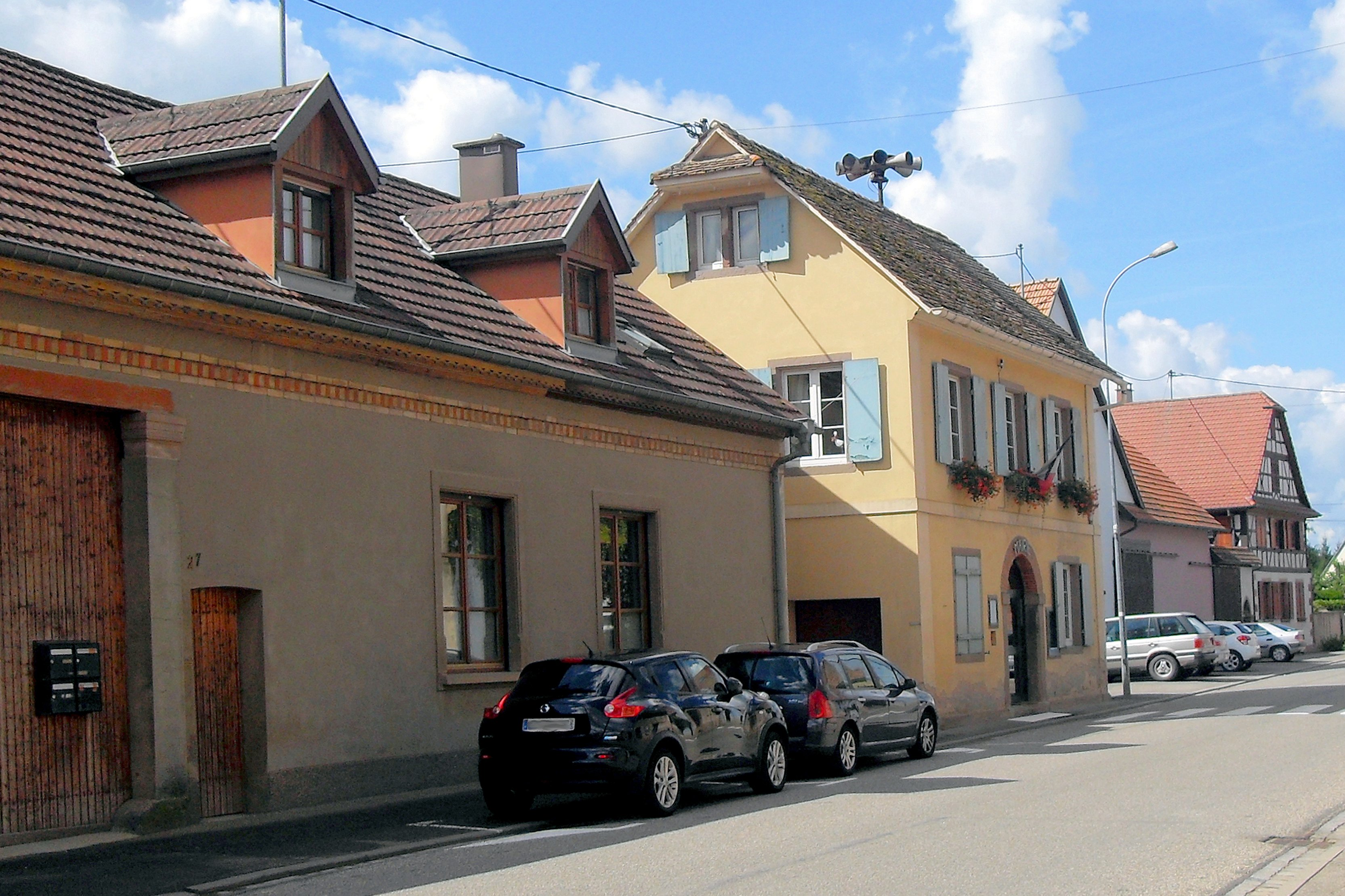
- The town hall in Mittelschaeffolsheim

- Coat of arms
- Location of Mittelschaeffolsheim
- Location within France Location within Grand Est
- Coordinates: 48°42′04″N 7°39′10″E
- Country: France
- Region: Grand Est
- Department: Bas-Rhin
- Arrondissement: Haguenau-Wissembourg
- Canton: Brumath
- Intercommunality: CA Haguenau

Government
  - Mayor (2020–2026): Alain Wack
- Area^{1}: 2.64 km^{2} (1.02 sq mi)
- Highest elevation: 189 m (620 ft)
- Lowest elevation: 160 m (520 ft)
- Population (2023): 560
  - Density: 210/km^{2} (550/sq mi)
- Time zone: UTC+01:00 (CET)
  - Summer (DST): UTC+02:00 (CEST)
- INSEE/Postal code: 67298 /67170
- ^{1} French Land Register data, which excludes lakes, ponds, glaciers > 1 km^{2} (0.386 sq mi or 247 acres) and river estuaries.

Mittelschaeffolsheim (German: Mittelschäffolsheim) is a commune in the Bas-Rhin department in Grand Est in north-eastern France.

== See also ==
- Communes of the Bas-Rhin department
