= Kaltenhouse =

Kaltenhouse Kàltehüse
- Commune
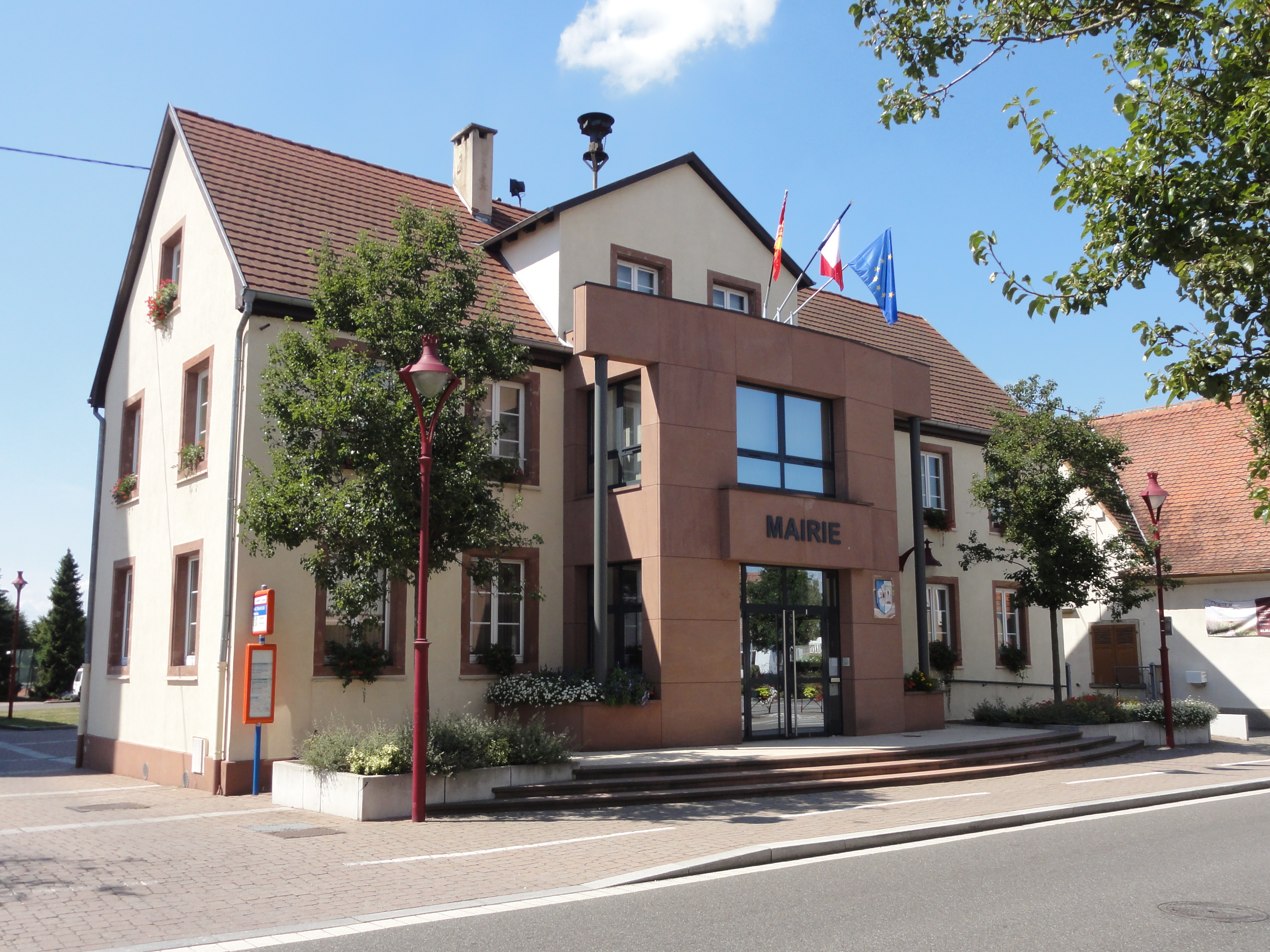
- The town hall in Kaltenhouse

- Coat of arms
- Location of Kaltenhouse
- Location within France Location within Grand Est
- Coordinates: 48°47′30″N 7°49′58″E
- Country: France
- Region: Grand Est
- Department: Bas-Rhin
- Arrondissement: Haguenau-Wissembourg
- Canton: Bischwiller
- Intercommunality: Haguenau

Government
  - Mayor (2020–2026): Isabelle Wenger
- Area^{1}: 3.72 km^{2} (1.44 sq mi)
- Highest elevation: 150 m (490 ft)
- Lowest elevation: 127 m (417 ft)
- Population (2023): 2,412
  - Density: 648/km^{2} (1,680/sq mi)
- Time zone: UTC+01:00 (CET)
  - Summer (DST): UTC+02:00 (CEST)
- INSEE/Postal code: 67230 /67240
- ^{1} French Land Register data, which excludes lakes, ponds, glaciers > 1 km^{2} (0.386 sq mi or 247 acres) and river estuaries.

Kaltenhouse (French pronunciation: [kaltənuz]; German: Kaltenhausen; Alsatian: Kàltehüse) is a commune in the Bas-Rhin department in Grand Est in north-eastern France. It lies a short distance to the southeast of Haguenau.

== Population ==
Historical population
Year	Pop.	±% p.a.
1968	1,567	—
1975	1,608	+0.37%
1982	1,640	+0.28%
1990	1,695	+0.41%
1999	1,897	+1.26%
2007	2,143	+1.54%
2012	2,240	+0.89%
2017	2,333	+0.82%
2023	2,412	+0.56%
Source: INSEE

== See also ==
- Communes of the Bas-Rhin department
