= Burgholzhausen vor der Höhe =

Coordinates: 50°15′13″N 8°40′20″E

Burgholzhausen vor der Höhe is a quarter of the city of Friedrichsdorf at the foothills of the Taunus mountain range, approx. 20 km (12 mi) north of Frankfurt am Main.

== History ==
The village was first mentioned in "letter of protection" by the archbishop Siegfried II. von Eppstein as "castra Holzhusin" back in 1222. In 1537 the "Eppsteiner Weistum" (a list of properties owned by the Lords of Eppstein) lists "Holtzhusen" as a village with 51 farmsteads and a fortification consisting of a double trench and two gates.
From the Middle Ages to the German Mediatisation Holzhausen - as it was called then - was a "Reichsdorf" (village of the empire) with a 2/3 status of imperial immediacy, but apart from that was subordinated to a multitude of lords. After the introduction of the rule "Cuius regio, eius religio" by the "Peace of Augsburg" treaty this led to a convoluted separation of religious affiliations. Starting with the 16th century flax weaving mills became the main economic base for Burgholzhausen. Alongside the village's population lived on the processing of loam from their own quarries to produce pavers, oven- and wall-tiles. Later on in the 17th century fruit growing was introduced. In 1716 a Catholic church in the baroque style was erected.
In the 17th century the Counts of Ingelheim owned the village. In 1741 the village became part of the Landgraviate of Hessen-Kassel. Because of this a legal case was heard at the Imperial Chamber Court. The Landgrave of Hesse-Cassel - William VIII - based his title and the alleged purchase of the village in 1595 by the Count of Stolberg-Königstein. With the extinction of the family line of the Count of Hanau-Münzenberg due to the death of Johann Reinhard III. of Hanau in 1736, who was the last heir of the Stolberg family line, William VIII argued to be the rightful inheritor of the village. The Imperial Chamber Court awarded a compensation payment to Baron Franz Adolph Dietrich von Ingelheim and confirmed the reign over the village to William VIII, Landgrave of Hesse-Cassel. As a result, Holzhausen became part of the Office of Rodheim
At the time of the German Mediatisation in 1803 Burgholzhausen was one of the few last free villages of Holy Roman Empire. Between 1806 and 1810 Burgholzhausen was occupied by French troops and then became part of the Grand Duchy of Hesse. In 1832 Burgholzhausen became part of the district Friedberg.
On 19 July 1939 Holzhausen was officially renamed to Burgholzhausen. After the World War II, the township grew considerably due to the influx of refugees. As part of the local government reform in 1972 Burgholzhausen became a suburb of Friedrichsdorf and now belongs to the district Hochtaunuskreis.

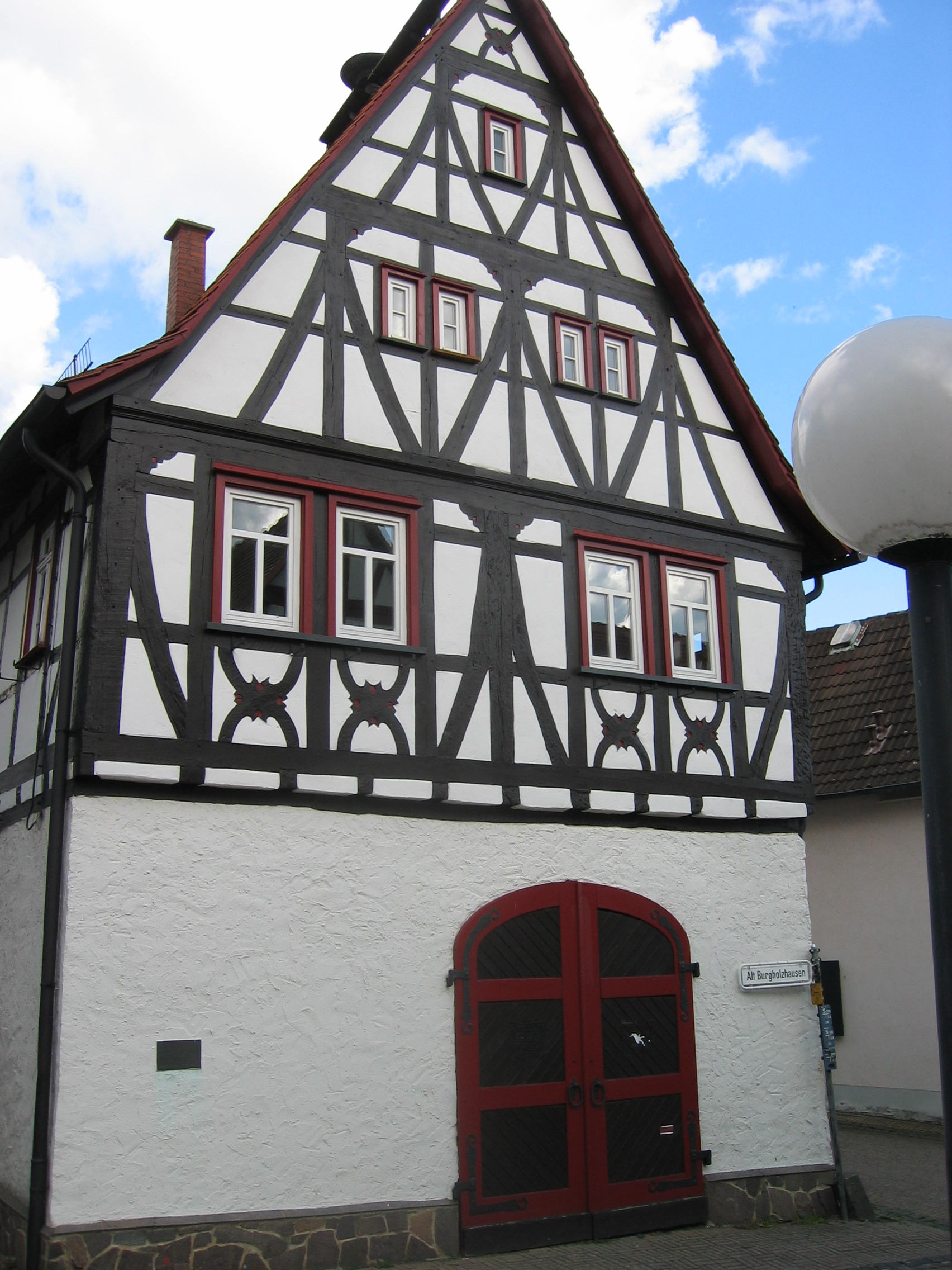
Old Town Hall (gable side)

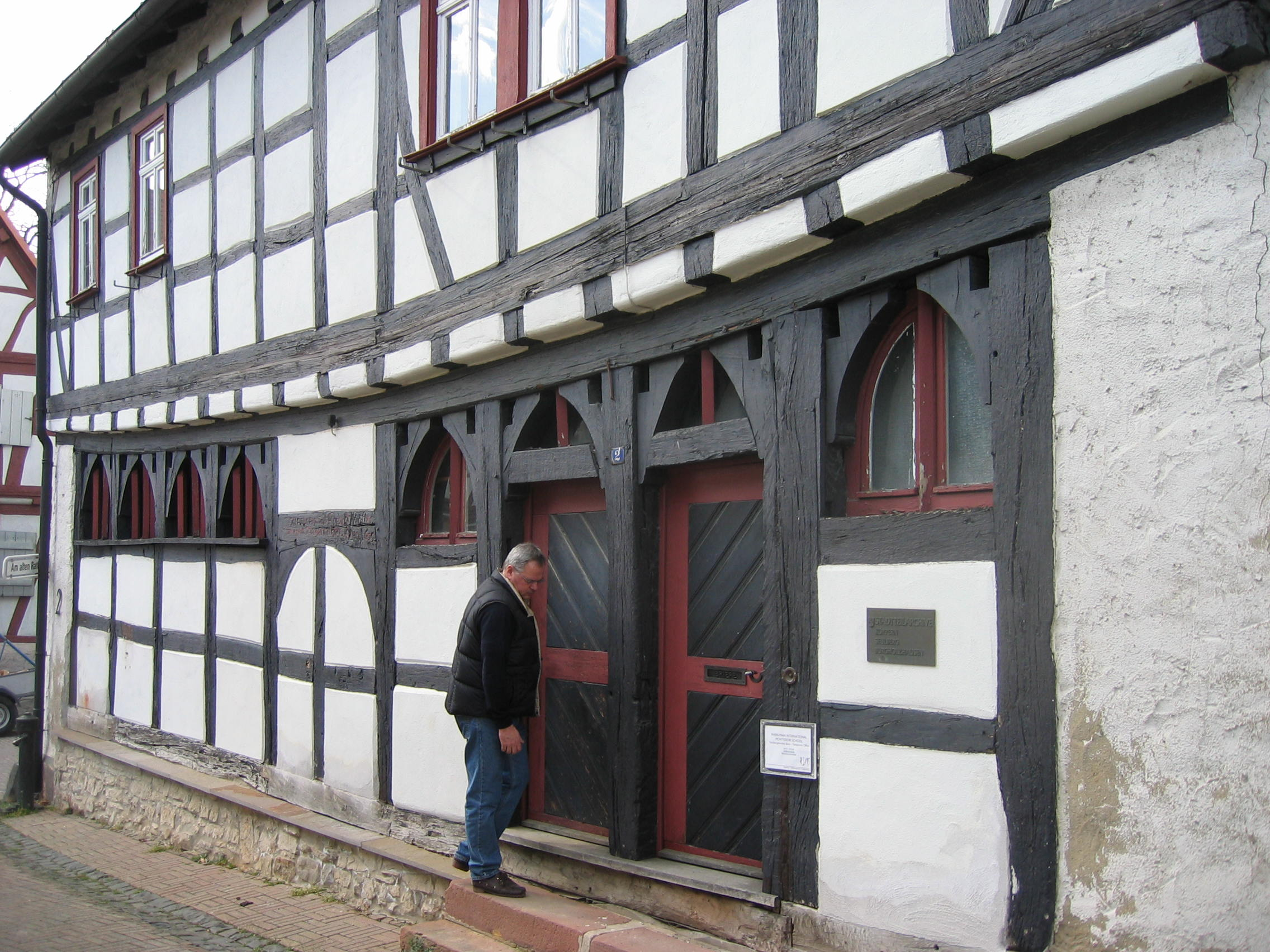
Burgholzhausen's Old Town Hall (1605)

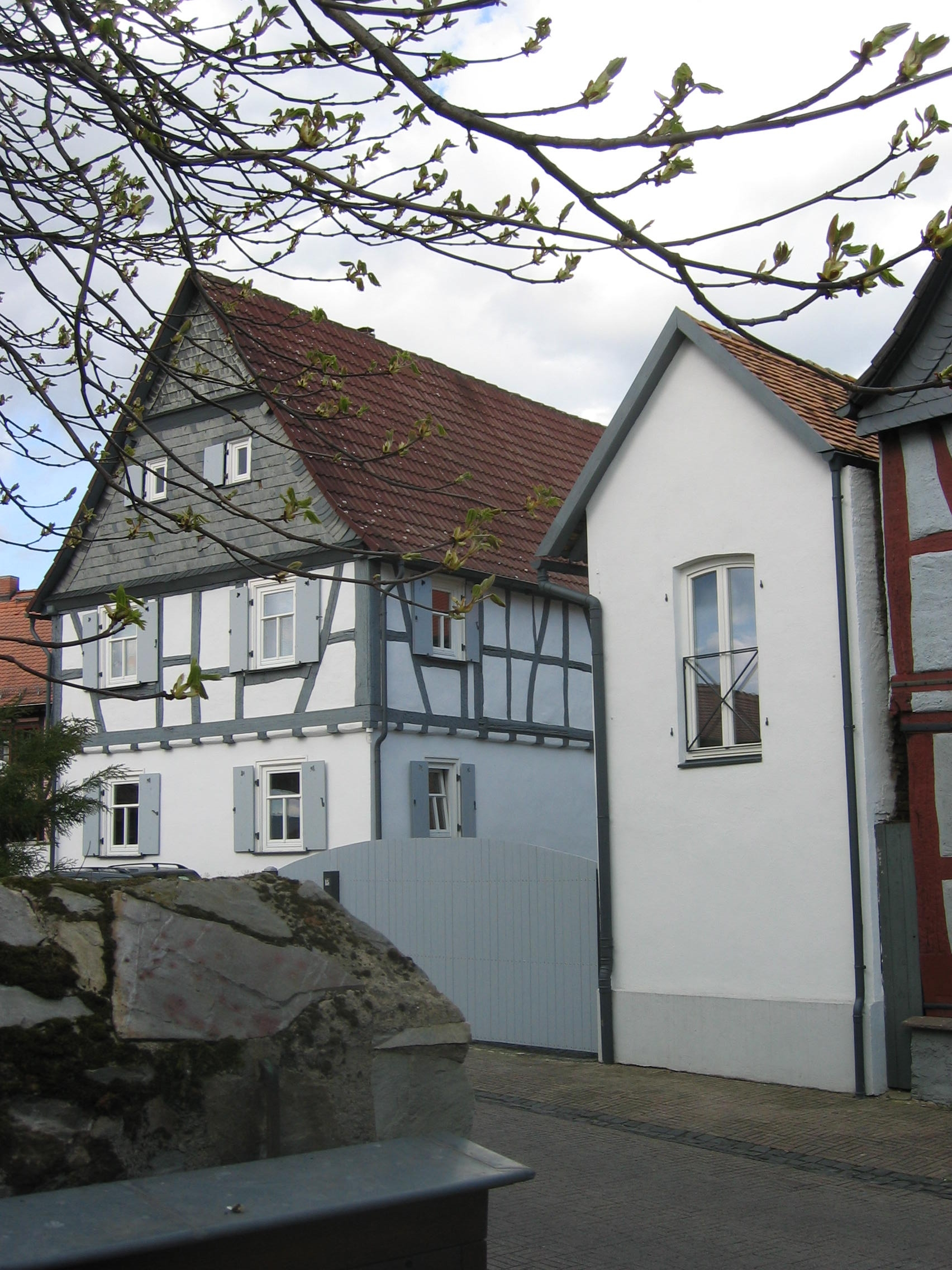
Renovated building from 1630 (downtown)

== Education ==
Burgholzhausen possesses a primary school with 190 pupils, twelve teachers, four special education teachers and a church representative. Motor pedagogical training and language aid training take place at the primary school of Burgholzhausen. The primary school possesses a work- and media-room for two classes and a computer room. Furthermore, a school choir exists.

== Politics ==
The "town district mayor" (Ortsvorsteher) of Burgholzhausen is Heinz Reinhard (FWG). The "town district council" (Ortsbeirat) is made up of:

Parties and Voters Associations		% 2026	Seats 2026	% 2021	Seats 2021	% 2016	Seats 2016	% 2011	Seats 2011	% 2006	Seats 2006	% 2001	Seats 2001
CDU	Christian Democratic Union	24.1	2	21.6	2	24.5	2	26.4	2	33.5	2	33.4	2
SPD	Social Democratic Party	12.4	1	6.9	0	11.0	1	12.8	1	15.9	1	27.6	2
GREENS	Alliance '90/The Greens	18.5	1	22.3	2	13.4	1	11.7	1	9.6	1	9.3	1
FDP	Free Democratic Party	9.7	1	6.4	0	7.2	0	5.9	0	5.8	0	7.3	1
FWG	Free Voters Association	35.4	2	42.7	3	43.8	3	43.2	3	35.2	3	4.6	0
UWG	Independent Voters Association	-	-	-	-	-	-	-	-	-	17.8	1	
Total		100,0	7	100,0	7	100,0	7	100,0	7	100,0	7	100,0	7
Turnout of voters in %		58.8		58.6		51.5		51.1		47.3		52.8	

== Cultural Environment ==
Since 1948 an amateur theater club - named Burgspielschar Burgholzhausen e. V. - exists in the suburb of Burgholzhausen, which is playing yearly at the open air theater "Alte Burg" (in summertime) and at the community centre in Köppern (in wintertime). In 2023 the club celebrated its 75th anniversary and presented a play for adults and another for children at the open air theater in summer.

== Sport ==
The biggest sports club in the suburb is the TV 1893 e. V. Burgholzhausen with its divisions for aikido, football, athletics, table tennis, gymnastics and volleyball. On 30 March 1977 the local tennis club - named TC Burgholzhausen 1977 - was founded. In direct neighborhood resides the Schützenverein 1954 e. V. Burgholzhausen (shooting club). Furthermore, a bowling club - named Holzfäller-Burgholzhausen - and an equestrian club named Westernreitclub City Slickers Burgholzhausen exist in Burgholzhausen.

== Traffic ==
Along the railway line Friedberg-Friedrichsdorf exists the railway station Burgholzhausen. The railway line was opened in 1901 and is now integrated into the Rhein-Main-Verkehrsverbund.
