= Berstheim =

Berstheim Barschem
- Commune
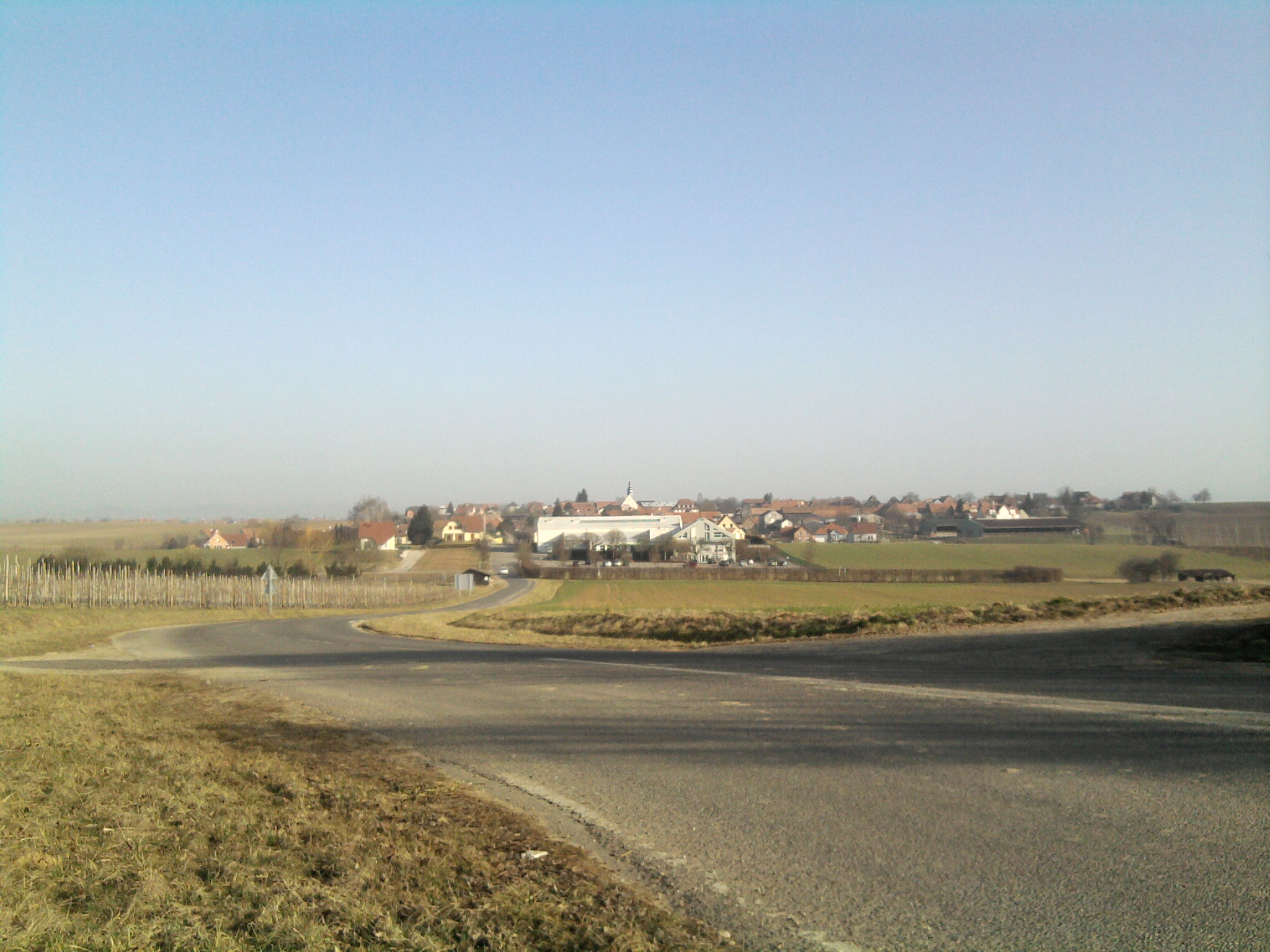
- A general view of Berstheim

- Coat of arms
- Location of Berstheim
- Location within France Location within Grand Est
- Coordinates: 48°47′35″N 7°40′36″E
- Country: France
- Region: Grand Est
- Department: Bas-Rhin
- Arrondissement: Haguenau-Wissembourg
- Canton: Haguenau
- Intercommunality: CA Haguenau

Government
  - Mayor (2020–2026): Rémy Gottri
- Area^{1}: 3.09 km^{2} (1.19 sq mi)
- Highest elevation: 222 m (728 ft)
- Lowest elevation: 171 m (561 ft)
- Population (2023): 513
  - Density: 166/km^{2} (430/sq mi)
- Time zone: UTC+01:00 (CET)
  - Summer (DST): UTC+02:00 (CEST)
- INSEE/Postal code: 67035 /67170
- ^{1} French Land Register data, which excludes lakes, ponds, glaciers > 1 km^{2} (0.386 sq mi or 247 acres) and river estuaries.

Berstheim (French pronunciation: [bɛʁstaim]) is a commune in the Bas-Rhin department in Grand Est in northeastern France.

== Population ==
Historical population
Year	Pop.	±% p.a.
1968	231	—
1975	243	+0.73%
1982	264	+1.19%
1990	310	+2.03%
1999	357	+1.58%
2007	378	+0.72%
2012	413	+1.79%
2017	437	+1.14%
2023	513	+2.71%
Source: INSEE

== See also ==
- Communes of the Bas-Rhin department
