= Bitschhoffen =

Bitschhoffen Bìtschoffe
- Commune
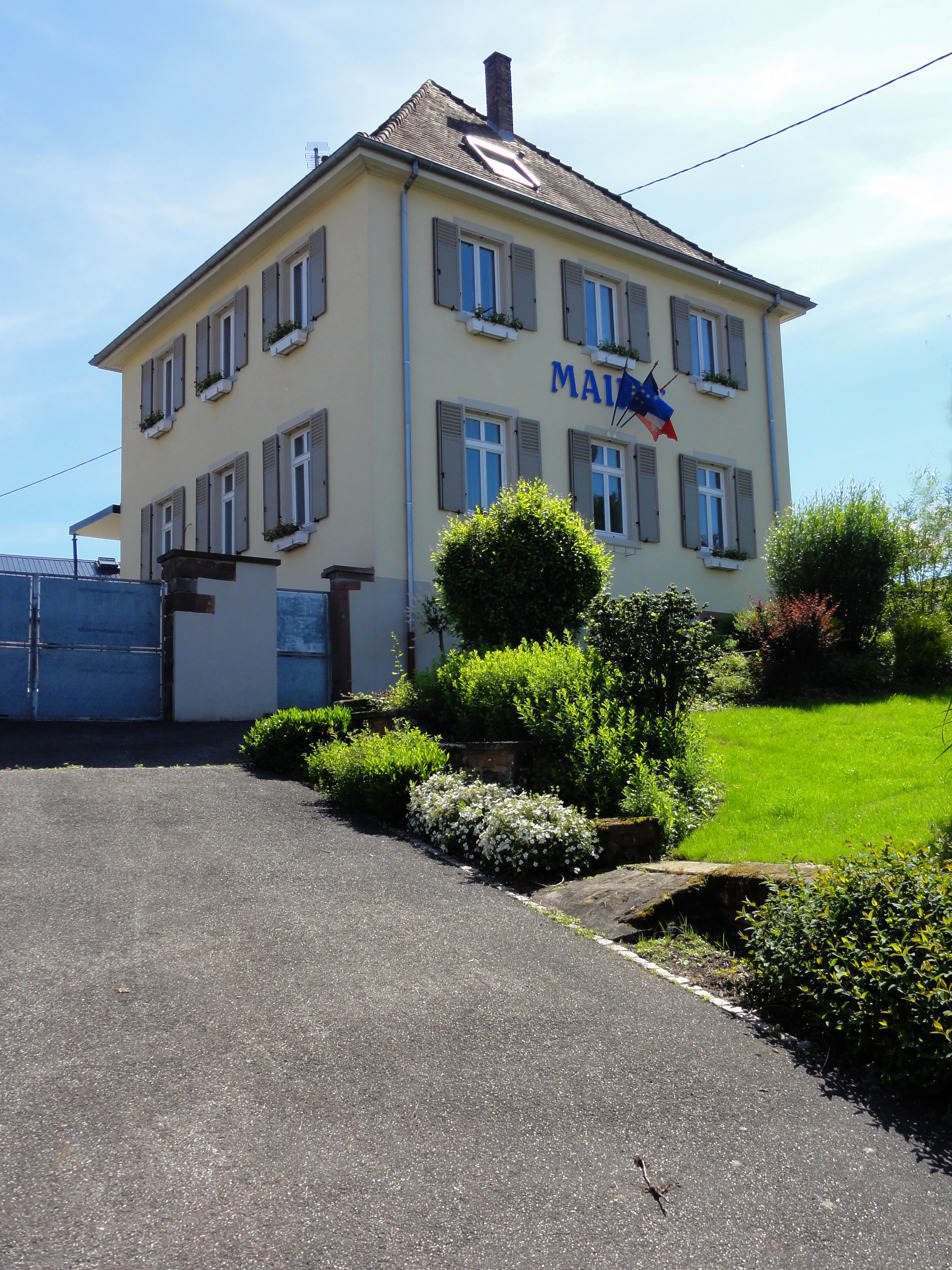
- The town hall in Bitschhoffen

- Coat of arms
- Location of Bitschhoffen
- Location within France Location within Grand Est
- Coordinates: 48°51′35″N 7°37′15″E
- Country: France
- Region: Grand Est
- Department: Bas-Rhin
- Arrondissement: Haguenau-Wissembourg
- Canton: Reichshoffen
- Intercommunality: CA Haguenau

Government
  - Mayor (2020–2026): François Anstett
- Area^{1}: 2.54 km^{2} (0.98 sq mi)
- Highest elevation: 229 m (751 ft)
- Lowest elevation: 173 m (568 ft)
- Population (2023): 462
  - Density: 182/km^{2} (471/sq mi)
- Time zone: UTC+01:00 (CET)
  - Summer (DST): UTC+02:00 (CEST)
- INSEE/Postal code: 67048 /67350
- ^{1} French Land Register data, which excludes lakes, ponds, glaciers > 1 km^{2} (0.386 sq mi or 247 acres) and river estuaries.

Bitschhoffen is a commune in the Bas-Rhin department in Grand Est in northeastern France.

== Population ==
Historical population
Year	Pop.	±% p.a.
1968	362	—
1975	412	+1.87%
1982	425	+0.44%
1990	399	−0.79%
1999	416	+0.46%
2007	459	+1.24%
2012	449	−0.44%
2017	459	+0.44%
2023	462	+0.11%
Source: INSEE

== See also ==
- Communes of the Bas-Rhin department
