= Uhlwiller =

- Commune
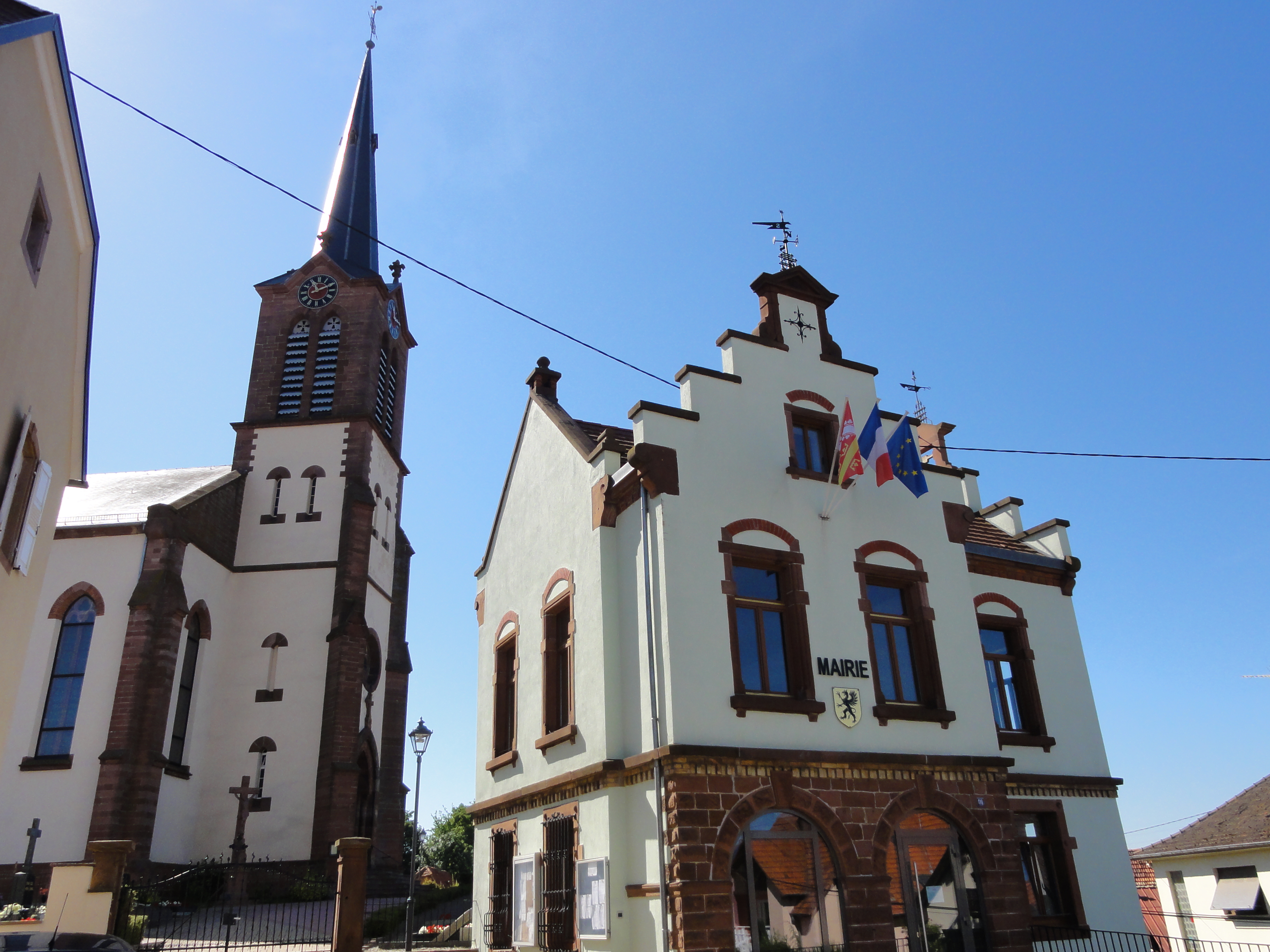
- The church and town hall in Uhlwiller

- Coat of arms
- Location of Uhlwiller
- Location within France Location within Grand Est
- Coordinates: 48°49′17″N 7°40′26″E
- Country: France
- Region: Grand Est
- Department: Bas-Rhin
- Arrondissement: Haguenau-Wissembourg
- Canton: Haguenau
- Intercommunality: CA Haguenau

Government
  - Mayor (2020–2026): Thomas Kleffer
- Area^{1}: 7.46 km^{2} (2.88 sq mi)
- Highest elevation: 237 m (778 ft)
- Lowest elevation: 154 m (505 ft)
- Population (2023): 665
  - Density: 89.1/km^{2} (231/sq mi)
- Time zone: UTC+01:00 (CET)
  - Summer (DST): UTC+02:00 (CEST)
- INSEE/Postal code: 67497 /67350
- ^{1} French Land Register data, which excludes lakes, ponds, glaciers > 1 km^{2} (0.386 sq mi or 247 acres) and river estuaries.

Uhlwiller (German: Uhlweiler) is a commune in the Bas-Rhin department in Grand Est in north-eastern France.

== See also ==
- Communes of the Bas-Rhin department
