= Wahlenheim =

- Commune
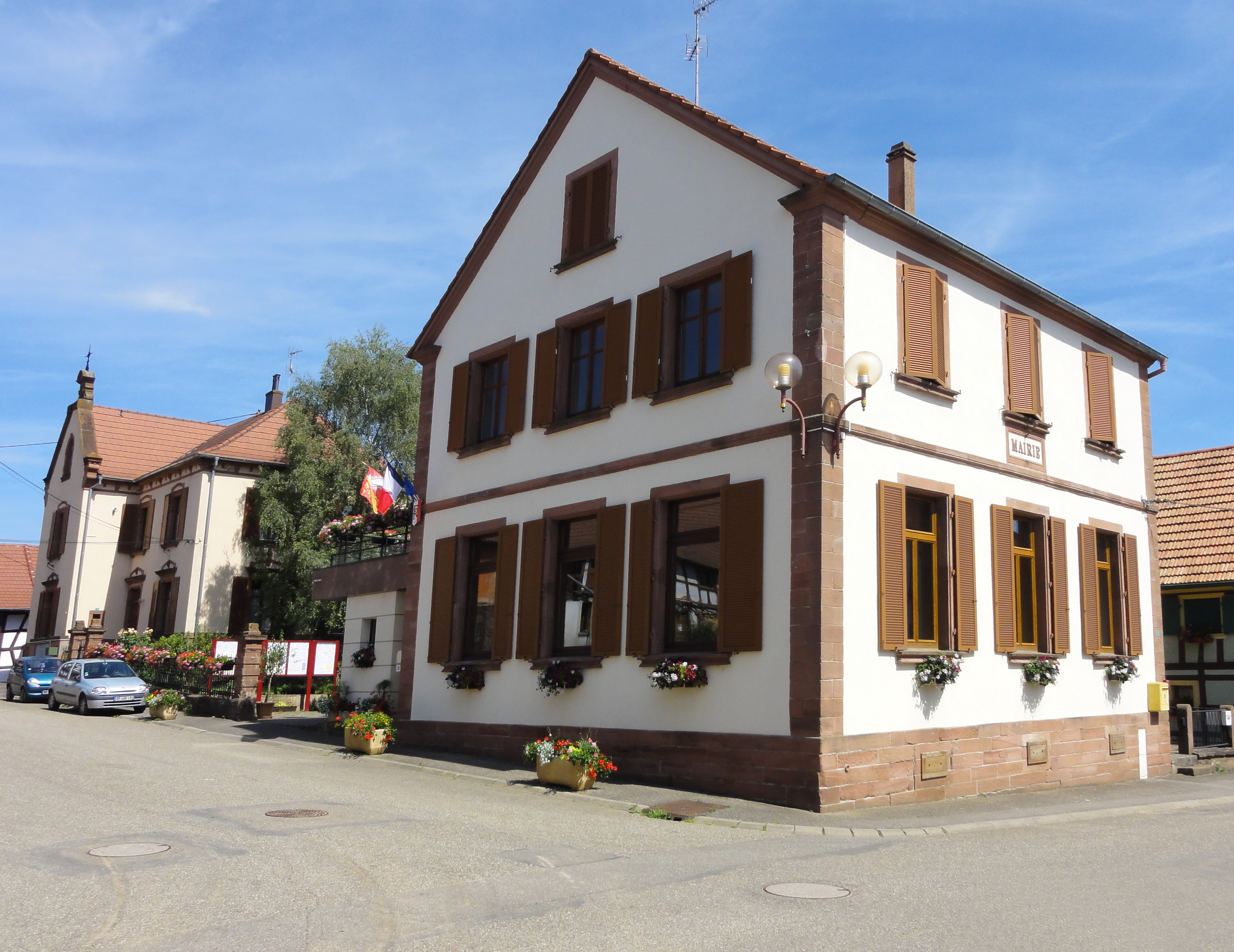
- The town hall in Wahlenheim

- Coat of arms
- Location of Wahlenheim
- Location within France Location within Grand Est
- Coordinates: 48°45′53″N 7°41′09″E
- Country: France
- Region: Grand Est
- Department: Bas-Rhin
- Arrondissement: Haguenau-Wissembourg
- Canton: Haguenau
- Intercommunality: Haguenau

Government
  - Mayor (2020–2026): Maurice Lutz
- Area^{1}: 2.55 km^{2} (0.98 sq mi)
- Elevation: 180 m (590 ft)
- Highest elevation: 198 m (650 ft)
- Lowest elevation: 169 m (554 ft)
- Population (2023): 649
  - Density: 255/km^{2} (659/sq mi)
- Time zone: UTC+01:00 (CET)
  - Summer (DST): UTC+02:00 (CEST)
- INSEE/Postal code: 67510 /67170
- ^{1} French Land Register data, which excludes lakes, ponds, glaciers > 1 km^{2} (0.386 sq mi or 247 acres) and river estuaries.

Wahlenheim (French pronunciation: [valənaim]; Alsatian: Wàhle) is a commune in the Bas-Rhin department in Grand Est in north-eastern France.

== Population ==
Historical population
Year	Pop.	±% p.a.
1968	231	—
1975	245	+0.84%
1982	340	+4.79%
1990	368	+0.99%
1999	365	−0.09%
2007	381	+0.54%
2012	379	−0.11%
2017	478	+4.75%
2023	649	+5.23%
Source: INSEE

== See also ==
- Communes of the Bas-Rhin department
