= Canton of Haguenau =

Coordinates: 48.82°N 7.79°E

- Canton
- Situation of the canton of Haguenau in the department of Bas-Rhin
- Country: France
- Region: Grand Est
- Department: Bas-Rhin
- No. of communes: {{{nbcomm}}}
- Population (2023): 51,687
- INSEE code: 6705

The canton of Haguenau is an administrative division of the Bas-Rhin department, northeastern France. Its borders were modified at the French canton reorganisation which came into effect in March 2015. Its seat is in Haguenau.

It consists of the following communes:

1. Batzendorf
2. Berstheim
3. Dauendorf
4. Haguenau
5. Hochstett
6. Huttendorf
7. Morschwiller
8. Niederschaeffolsheim
9. Ohlungen
10. Schweighouse-sur-Moder
11. Uhlwiller
12. Wahlenheim
13. Wintershouse
14. Wittersheim
