= Batzendorf =

- Commune
- Coat of arms
- Location of Batzendorf
- Location within France Location within Grand Est
- Coordinates: 48°47′03″N 7°42′22″E
- Country: France
- Region: Grand Est
- Department: Bas-Rhin
- Arrondissement: Haguenau-Wissembourg
- Canton: Haguenau
- Intercommunality: CA Haguenau

Government
  - Mayor (2020–2026): Isabelle Dollinger
- Area^{1}: 6.74 km^{2} (2.60 sq mi)
- Highest elevation: 206 m (676 ft)
- Lowest elevation: 161 m (528 ft)
- Population (2023): 975
  - Density: 145/km^{2} (375/sq mi)
- Time zone: UTC+01:00 (CET)
  - Summer (DST): UTC+02:00 (CEST)
- INSEE/Postal code: 67023 /67500
- ^{1} French Land Register data, which excludes lakes, ponds, glaciers > 1 km^{2} (0.386 sq mi or 247 acres) and river estuaries.

Batzendorf (French pronunciation: [batsəndɔʁf]; Alsatian: Bàtzedorf) is a commune in the Bas-Rhin department and Grand Est region of north-eastern France.

== Population ==
Historical population
Year	Pop.	±% p.a.
1968	534	—
1975	651	+2.87%
1982	718	+1.41%
1990	733	+0.26%
1999	826	+1.34%
2007	917	+1.31%
2012	954	+0.79%
2017	988	+0.70%
2023	975	−0.22%
Source: INSEE

== See also ==
- Communes of the Bas-Rhin department
