= Morschwiller =

- Commune
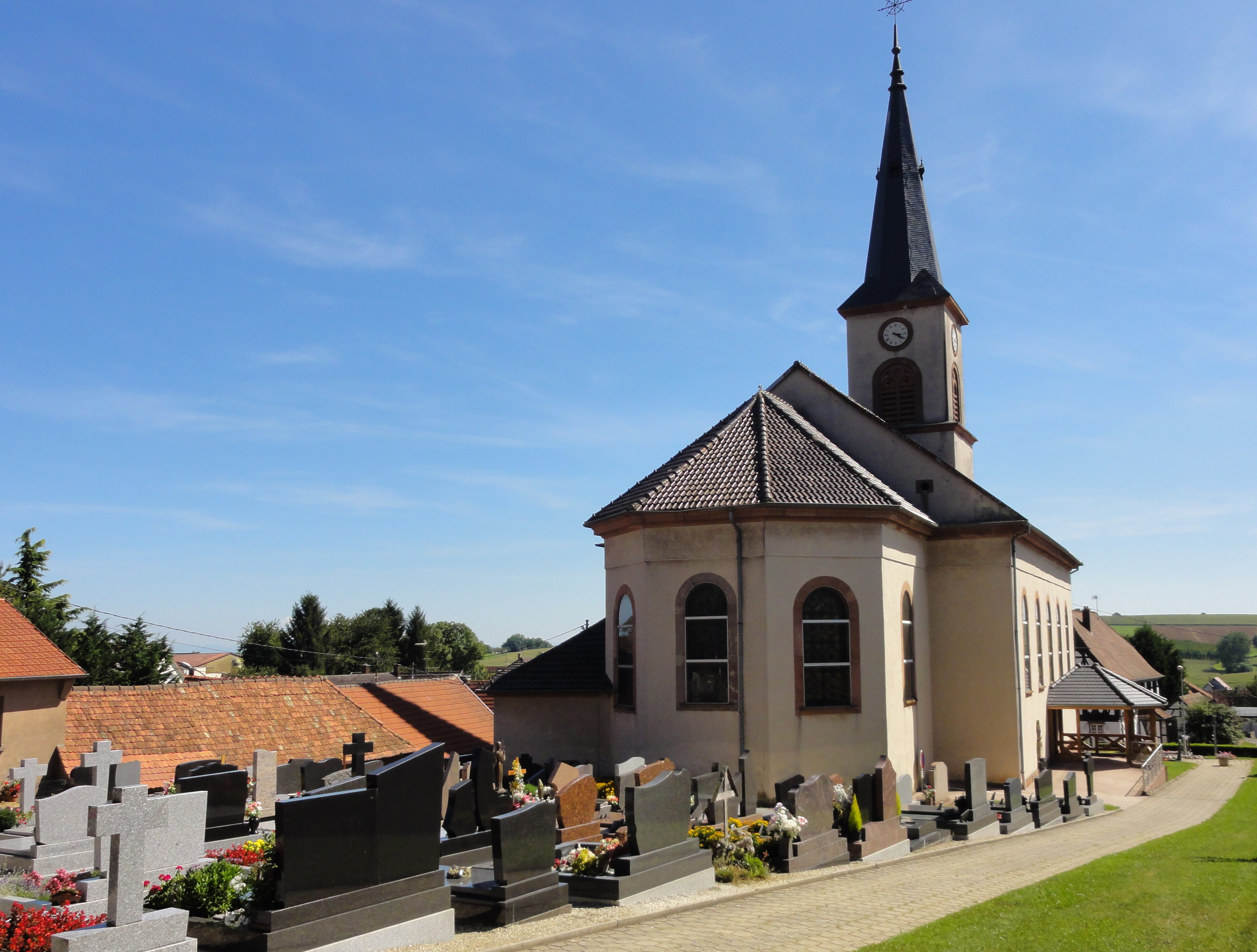
- The church in Morschwiller

- Coat of arms
- Location of Morschwiller
- Location within France Location within Grand Est
- Coordinates: 48°49′16″N 7°37′36″E
- Country: France
- Region: Grand Est
- Department: Bas-Rhin
- Arrondissement: Haguenau-Wissembourg
- Canton: Haguenau
- Intercommunality: CA Haguenau

Government
  - Mayor (2021–2026): Carine Steinmetz
- Area^{1}: 4.62 km^{2} (1.78 sq mi)
- Highest elevation: 302 m (991 ft)
- Lowest elevation: 194 m (636 ft)
- Population (2023): 611
  - Density: 132/km^{2} (343/sq mi)
- Time zone: UTC+01:00 (CET)
  - Summer (DST): UTC+02:00 (CEST)
- INSEE/Postal code: 67304 /67350
- ^{1} French Land Register data, which excludes lakes, ponds, glaciers > 1 km^{2} (0.386 sq mi or 247 acres) and river estuaries.

Morschwiller (French pronunciation: [mɔʁʃvilɛʁ]; German: Morschweiler) is a commune in the Bas-Rhin department in Grand Est in north-eastern France.

== Etymology and names ==
The first written reference to Morschwiller's name was in 771 A.D., when it was called Moraswilari. Other historical names for the village include: Moresheim (840), Morinsheim (870), Morswilre (1372), Morsweyler (1666), and Morschweiler/Morschwiller by the 18th and 19th centuries.

The willer/weiler (English: hamlet) suffix of Morschwiller comes from Middle High German wīler, from Old High German wīlāri, from Latin villa (“estate”).

== See also ==
- Communes of the Bas-Rhin department
