= Hochstett =

Hochstett Heestett
- Commune
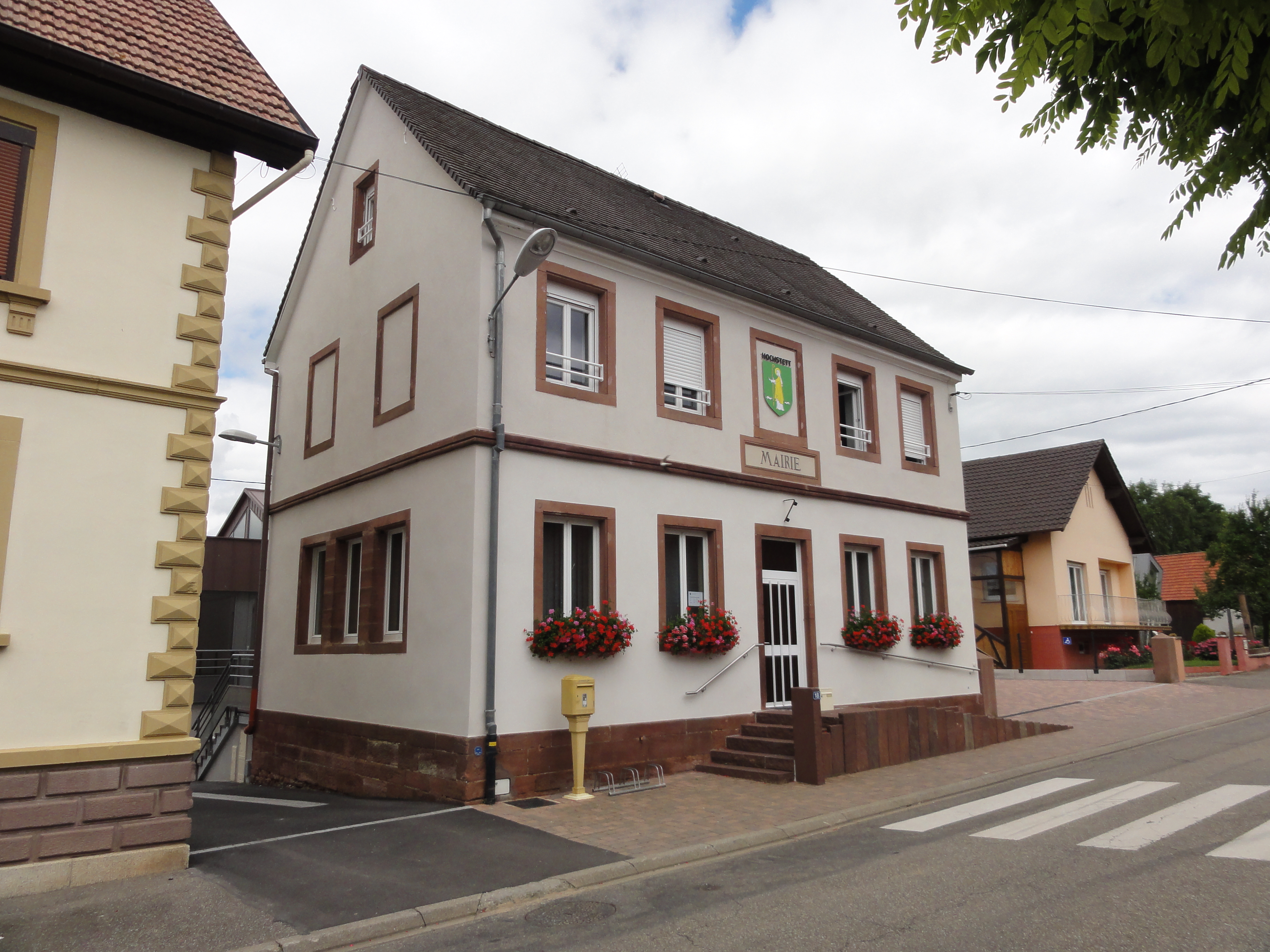
- The town hall in Hochstett
- Location of Hochstett
- Location within France Location within Grand Est
- Coordinates: 48°46′44″N 7°40′38″E
- Country: France
- Region: Grand Est
- Department: Bas-Rhin
- Arrondissement: Haguenau-Wissembourg
- Canton: Haguenau
- Intercommunality: CA Haguenau

Government
  - Mayor (2020–2026): Clément Jung
- Area^{1}: 2.13 km^{2} (0.82 sq mi)
- Highest elevation: 217 m (712 ft)
- Lowest elevation: 172 m (564 ft)
- Population (2023): 422
  - Density: 198/km^{2} (513/sq mi)
- Time zone: UTC+01:00 (CET)
  - Summer (DST): UTC+02:00 (CEST)
- INSEE/Postal code: 67203 /67170
- ^{1} French Land Register data, which excludes lakes, ponds, glaciers > 1 km^{2} (0.386 sq mi or 247 acres) and river estuaries.

Hochstett is a commune in the Bas-Rhin department in Grand Est in north-eastern France.

== Geography ==
Hochstett is positioned near to the autoroute that connects Strasbourg with Metz and, eventually, Paris. It is adjacent to the autoroute exit 47 which is the exit for Haguenau, although the limited access nature of the autoroute junctions in the area makes access from the autoroute to the village unexpectedly indirect.

The village is at the crossing of various minor roads, the least minor being the departmental road RD 419.

A principal element in the local economy is agriculture.

== See also ==
- Communes of the Bas-Rhin department
