= Huttendorf =

Huttendorf Hüttendorf
- Commune
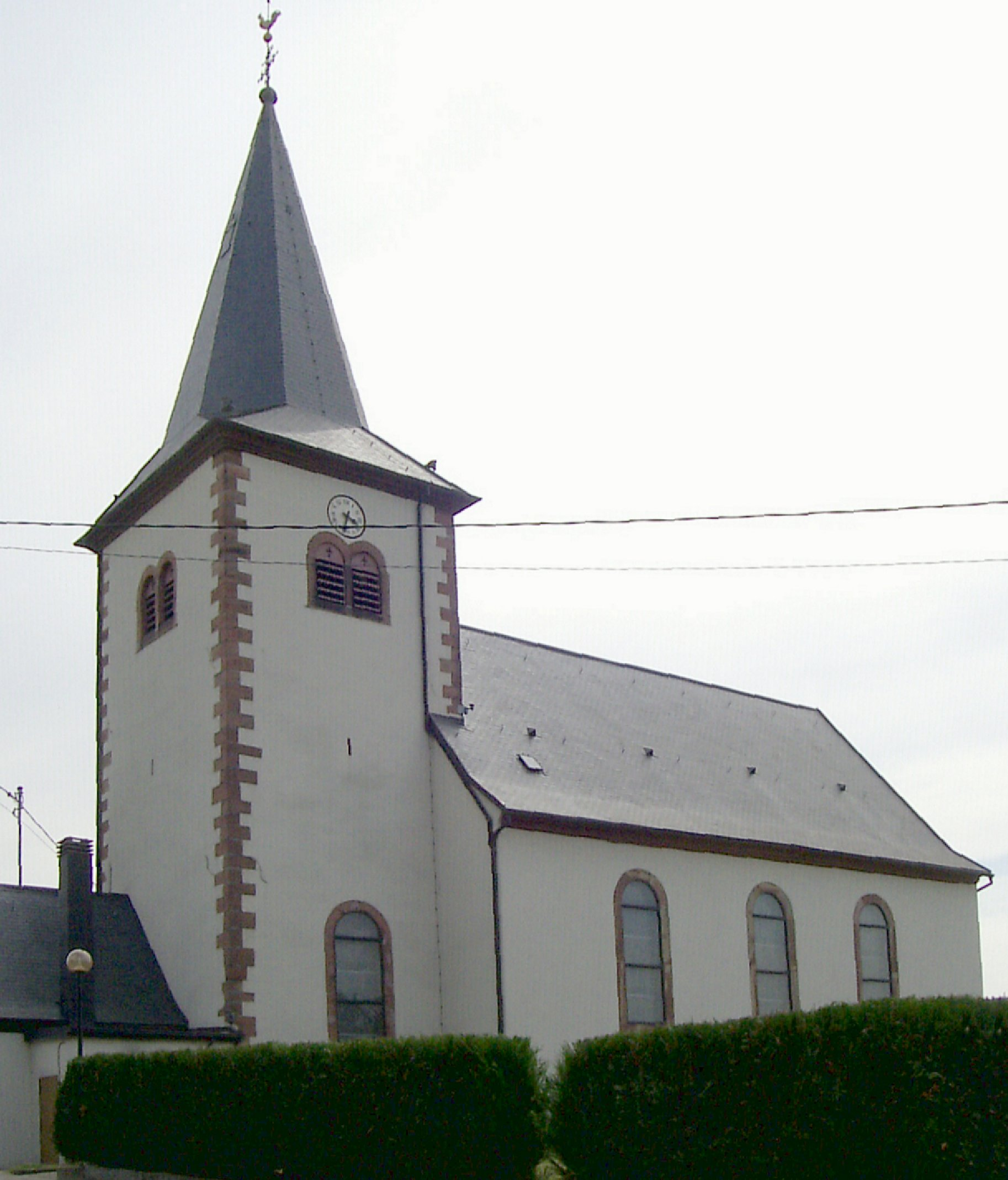
- The church in Huttendorf

- Coat of arms
- Location of Huttendorf
- Location within France Location within Grand Est
- Coordinates: 48°48′06″N 7°38′27″E
- Country: France
- Region: Grand Est
- Department: Bas-Rhin
- Arrondissement: Haguenau-Wissembourg
- Canton: Haguenau
- Intercommunality: CA Haguenau

Government
  - Mayor (2020–2026): Francis Klein
- Area^{1}: 4.4 km^{2} (1.7 sq mi)
- Highest elevation: 268 m (879 ft)
- Lowest elevation: 190 m (620 ft)
- Population (2023): 502
  - Density: 110/km^{2} (300/sq mi)
- Time zone: UTC+01:00 (CET)
  - Summer (DST): UTC+02:00 (CEST)
- INSEE/Postal code: 67215 /67270
- ^{1} French Land Register data, which excludes lakes, ponds, glaciers > 1 km^{2} (0.386 sq mi or 247 acres) and river estuaries.

Huttendorf (French pronunciation: [ytəndɔʁf]; German: Hüttendorf) is a commune in the Bas-Rhin department and Grand Est region of north-eastern France.

== Geography ==
Agriculture, including the rearing of livestock, plays an important part in the village's economy.

== History ==
The first surviving record of the village appears under the name of Hittendorphe and dates from 797. At that time the settlement was part of the lands of the Abbey of Wissembourg.

The church of Saint Vincent dates from 1746, although the tower is older. The organ, dating from 1853, was built by Pierre Rivenach.

== See also ==
- Communes of the Bas-Rhin department
