= Uhrwiller =

- Commune
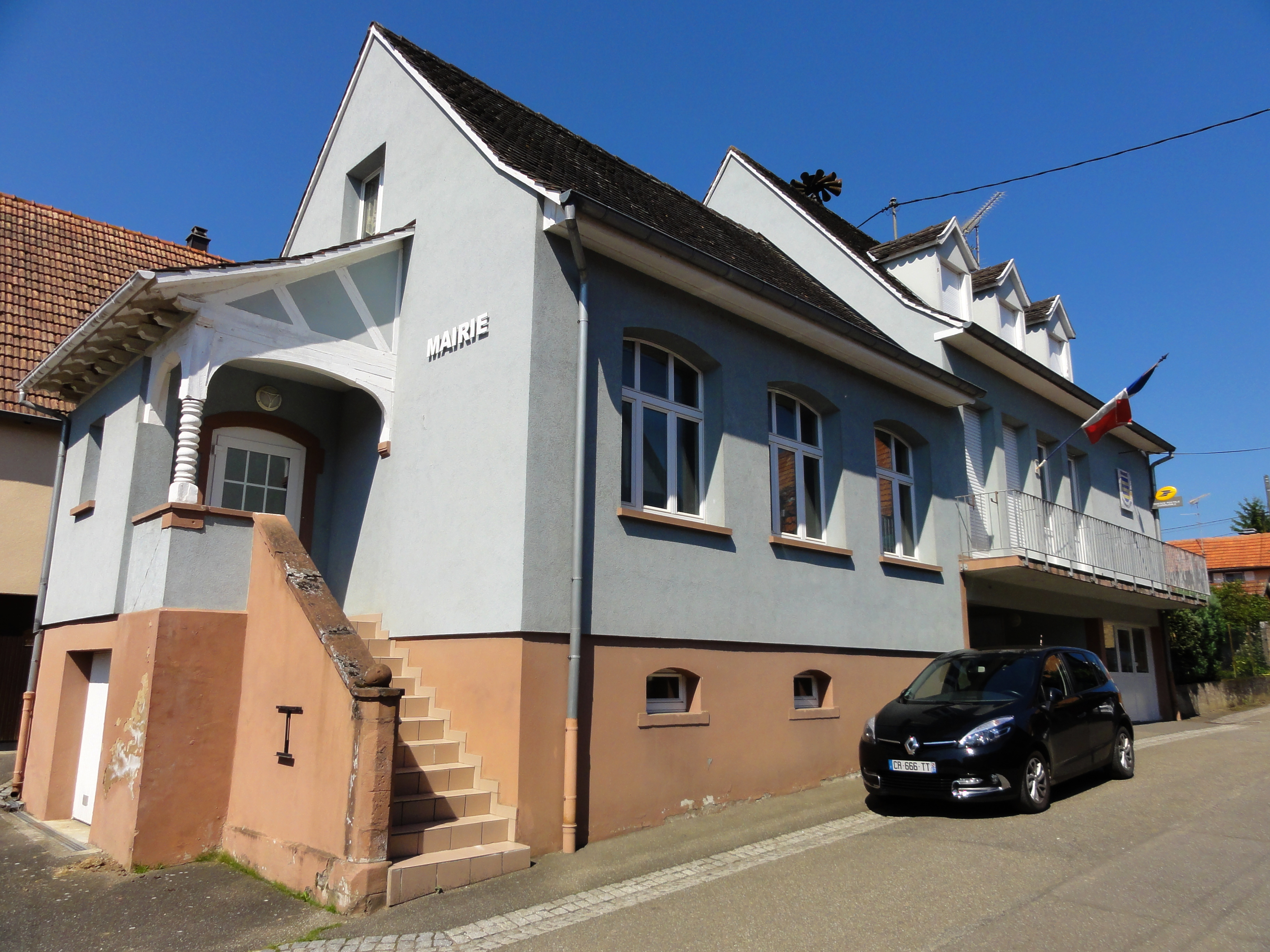
- The town hall in Uhrwiller

- Coat of arms
- Location of Uhrwiller
- Location within France Location within Grand Est
- Coordinates: 48°52′42″N 7°34′45″E
- Country: France
- Region: Grand Est
- Department: Bas-Rhin
- Arrondissement: Haguenau-Wissembourg
- Canton: Reichshoffen
- Intercommunality: CA Haguenau

Government
  - Mayor (2020–2026): Michel Fichter
- Area^{1}: 11.02 km^{2} (4.25 sq mi)
- Highest elevation: 266 m (873 ft)
- Lowest elevation: 172 m (564 ft)
- Population (2023): 709
  - Density: 64.3/km^{2} (167/sq mi)
- Time zone: UTC+01:00 (CET)
  - Summer (DST): UTC+02:00 (CEST)
- INSEE/Postal code: 67498 /67350
- ^{1} French Land Register data, which excludes lakes, ponds, glaciers > 1 km^{2} (0.386 sq mi or 247 acres) and river estuaries.

Uhrwiller (German: Uhrweiler) is a commune in the Bas-Rhin department in Grand Est in north-eastern France. The archaeologist Ernest Will (1913–1997) was born in Uhrwiller.

It is about 45 km (28 mi) north and slightly west of Strasbourg.

== Population ==
Historical population
Year	Pop.	±% p.a.
1968	704	—
1975	681	−0.47%
1982	704	+0.48%
1990	715	+0.19%
1999	697	−0.28%
2007	687	−0.18%
2012	702	+0.43%
2017	706	+0.11%
2023	709	+0.07%
Source: INSEE

== See also ==
- Communes of the Bas-Rhin department
