= Wittersheim =

- Commune
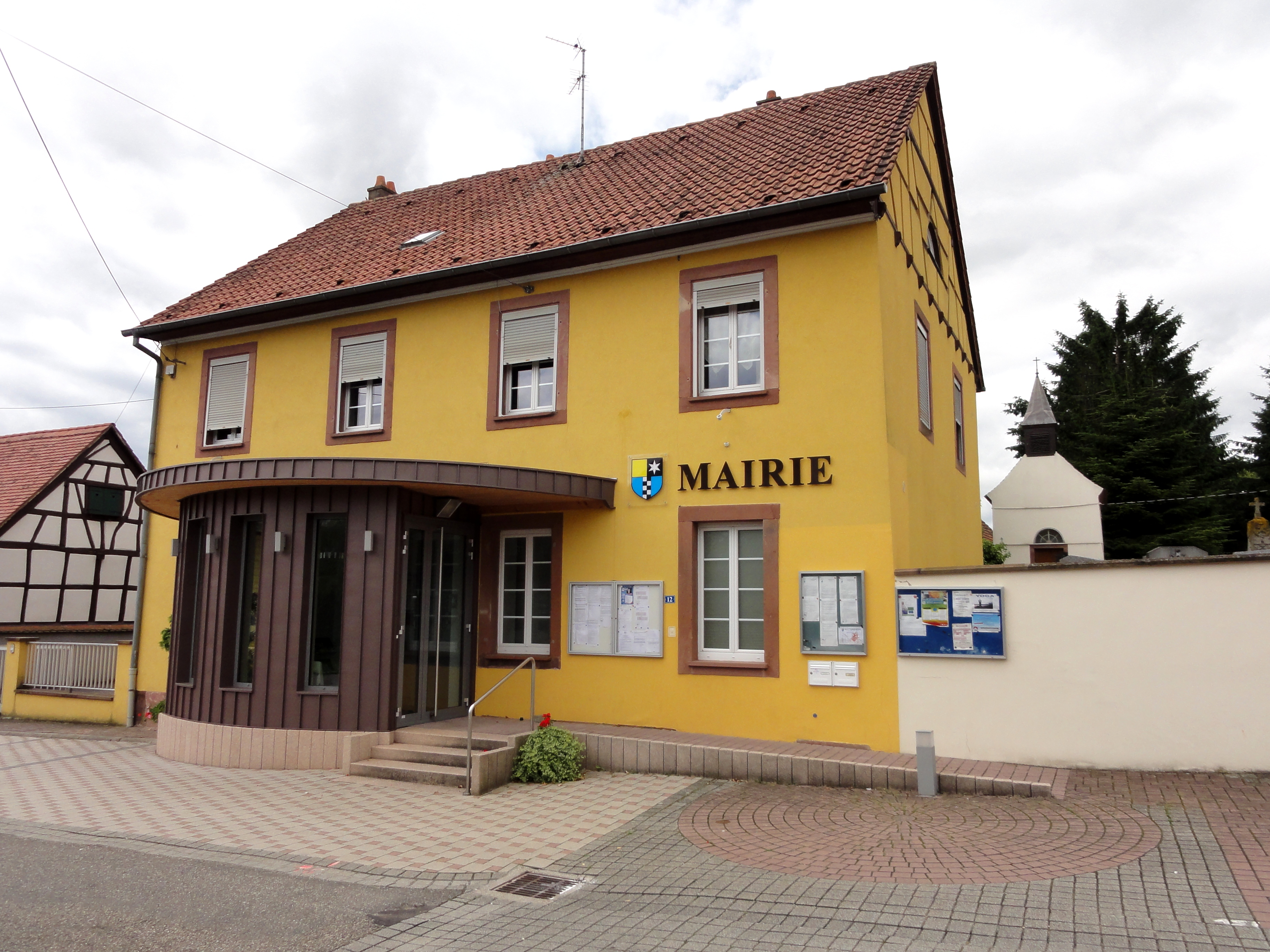
- The town hall in Wittersheim

- Coat of arms
- Location of Wittersheim
- Location within France Location within Grand Est
- Coordinates: 48°46′54″N 7°39′33″E
- Country: France
- Region: Grand Est
- Department: Bas-Rhin
- Arrondissement: Haguenau-Wissembourg
- Canton: Haguenau
- Intercommunality: CA Haguenau

Government
  - Mayor (2020–2026): Jean-Marc Steinmetz
- Area^{1}: 7.05 km^{2} (2.72 sq mi)
- Elevation: 195 m (640 ft)
- Highest elevation: 230 m (750 ft)
- Lowest elevation: 158 m (518 ft)
- Population (2023): 747
  - Density: 106/km^{2} (274/sq mi)
- Time zone: UTC+01:00 (CET)
  - Summer (DST): UTC+02:00 (CEST)
- INSEE/Postal code: 67546 /67670
- ^{1} French Land Register data, which excludes lakes, ponds, glaciers > 1 km^{2} (0.386 sq mi or 247 acres) and river estuaries.

Wittersheim is a commune in the Bas-Rhin department in Grand Est in north-eastern France. It has an area of 7.05 km^{2}.

== Population ==
Historical population
Year	Pop.	±% p.a.
1968	418	—
1975	414	−0.14%
1982	444	+1.00%
1990	443	−0.03%
1999	503	+1.42%
2007	582	+1.84%
2012	597	+0.51%
2017	661	+2.06%
2023	747	+2.06%
Source: INSEE

== See also ==
- Communes of the Bas-Rhin department
