= Kindwiller =

- Commune
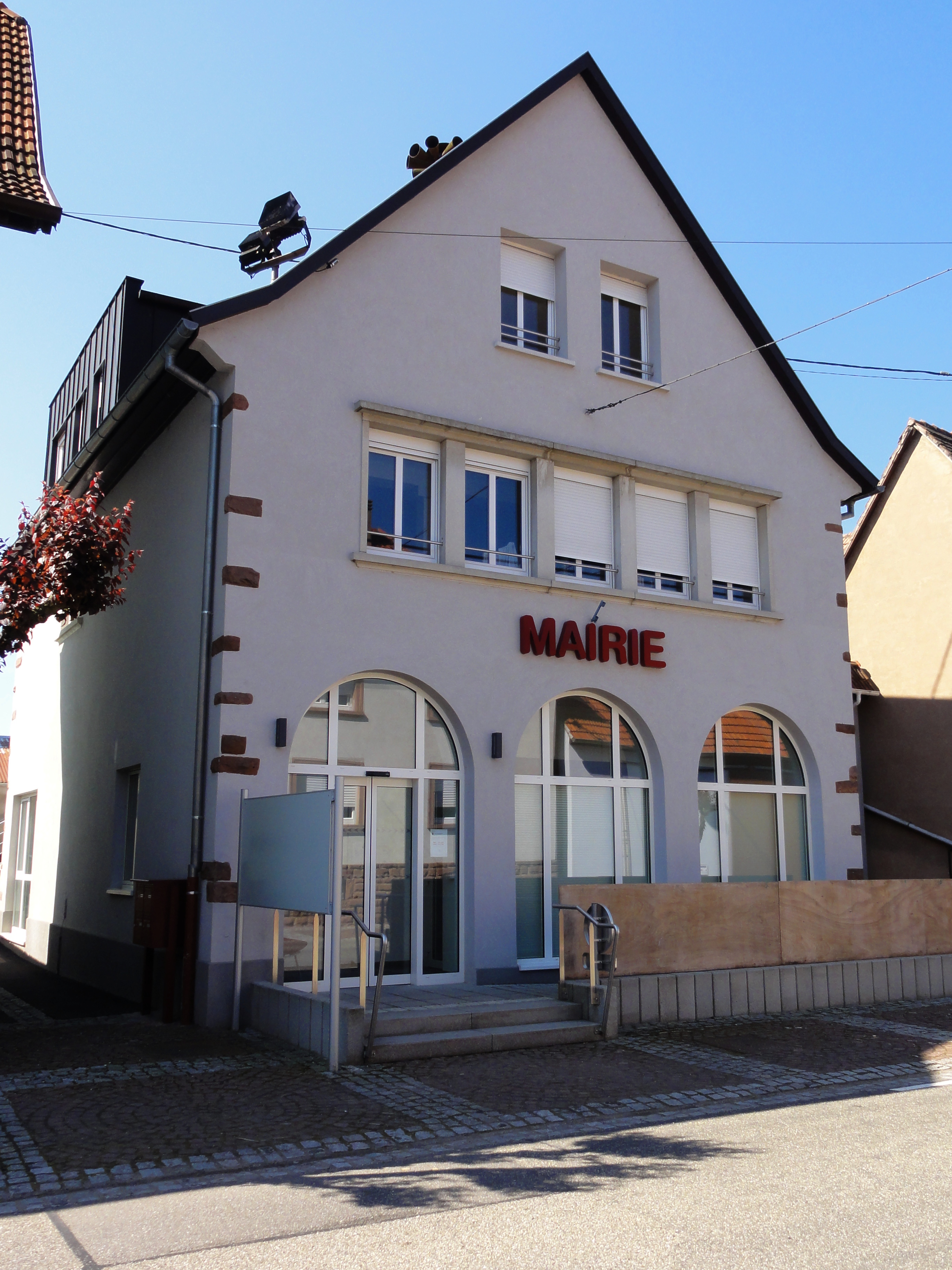
- The town hall in Kindwiller

- Coat of arms
- Location of Kindwiller
- Location within France Location within Grand Est
- Coordinates: 48°51′48″N 7°35′55″E
- Country: France
- Region: Grand Est
- Department: Bas-Rhin
- Arrondissement: Haguenau-Wissembourg
- Canton: Reichshoffen
- Intercommunality: CA Haguenau

Government
  - Mayor (2020–2026): Gérard Voltz
- Area^{1}: 5.97 km^{2} (2.31 sq mi)
- Highest elevation: 226 m (741 ft)
- Lowest elevation: 168 m (551 ft)
- Population (2023): 653
  - Density: 109/km^{2} (283/sq mi)
- Time zone: UTC+01:00 (CET)
  - Summer (DST): UTC+02:00 (CEST)
- INSEE/Postal code: 67238 /67350
- ^{1} French Land Register data, which excludes lakes, ponds, glaciers > 1 km^{2} (0.386 sq mi or 247 acres) and river estuaries.

Kindwiller (French pronunciation: [kindvilɛʁ]; German: Kindweiler; Alsatian: Kendwéler) is a commune in the Bas-Rhin department in Grand Est, France.

== Geography ==
The village is positioned some fifteen kilometres (nine miles) to the west-north-west of Haguenau.

Most of the houses are on the single main street. Outside the village the land is mostly used for farming.

== History ==
The first surviving record of the village dates from 1317 when it was named as Kintwilre, the residence of a family of that same name. The area was at that time owned by Haguenau. The High German name "Kindweiler" emerges later.

During the wars of religion that spilled into Alsace in the sixteenth century, the village became protestant in 1545 but reverted to Catholicism in 1561.

Kindwiller also enjoyed the privileges of an imperial village.

== See also ==
- Communes of the Bas-Rhin department
