= Niederschaeffolsheim =

- Commune
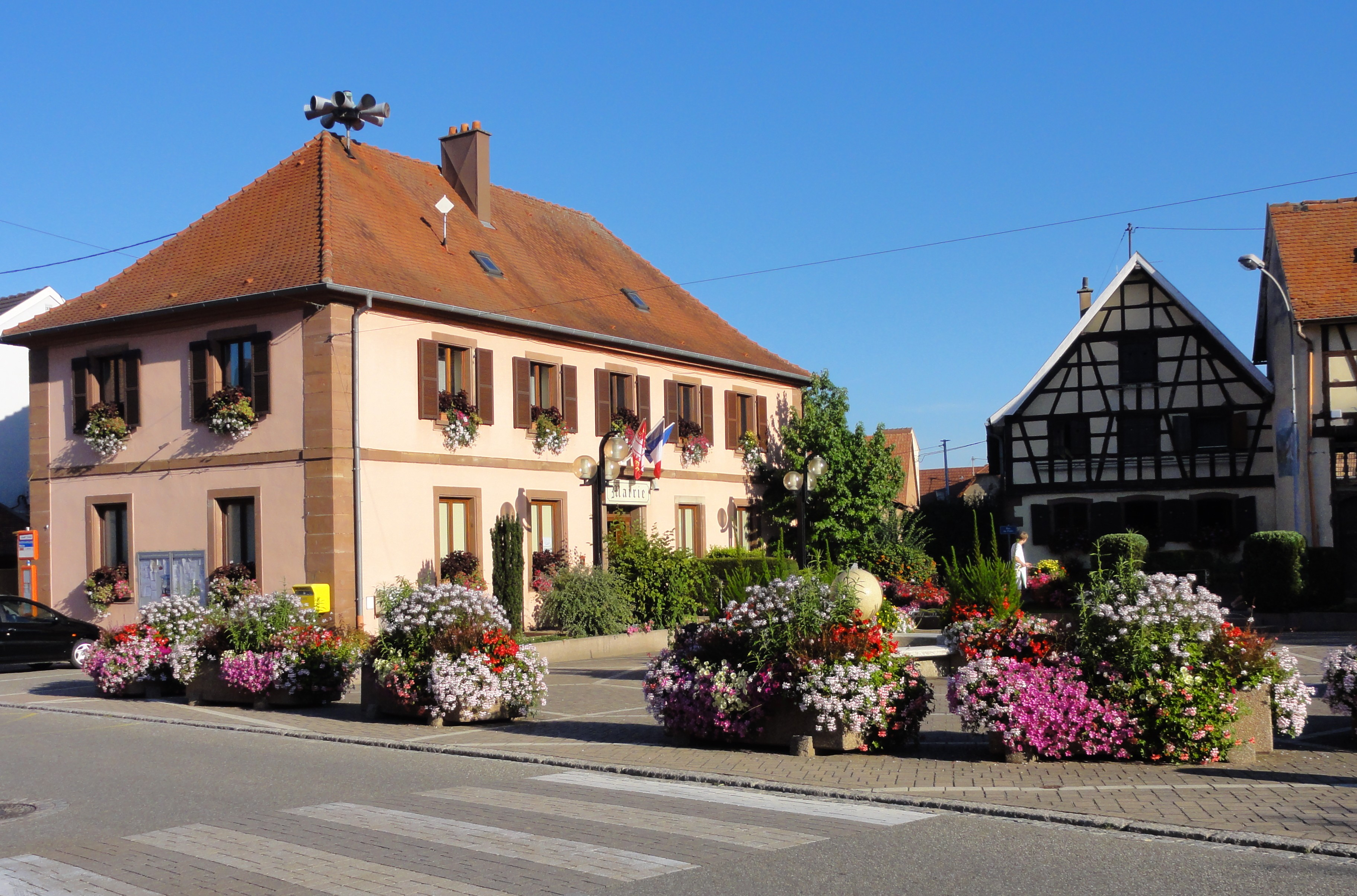
- The town hall in Niederschaeffolsheim

- Coat of arms
- Location of Niederschaeffolsheim
- Location within France Location within Grand Est
- Coordinates: 48°46′23″N 7°44′21″E
- Country: France
- Region: Grand Est
- Department: Bas-Rhin
- Arrondissement: Haguenau-Wissembourg
- Canton: Haguenau
- Intercommunality: CA Haguenau

Government
  - Mayor (2026–32): Tom Paulus
- Area^{1}: 6.24 km^{2} (2.41 sq mi)
- Highest elevation: 197 m (646 ft)
- Lowest elevation: 158 m (518 ft)
- Population (2023): 1,325
  - Density: 212/km^{2} (550/sq mi)
- Time zone: UTC+01:00 (CET)
  - Summer (DST): UTC+02:00 (CEST)
- INSEE/Postal code: 67331 /67500
- ^{1} French Land Register data, which excludes lakes, ponds, glaciers > 1 km^{2} (0.386 sq mi or 247 acres) and river estuaries.

Niederschaeffolsheim (German: Niederschäffolsheim) is a commune in the Bas-Rhin department and Grand Est region of north-eastern France.

== See also ==
- Communes of the Bas-Rhin department
