= Schirrhein =

- Commune
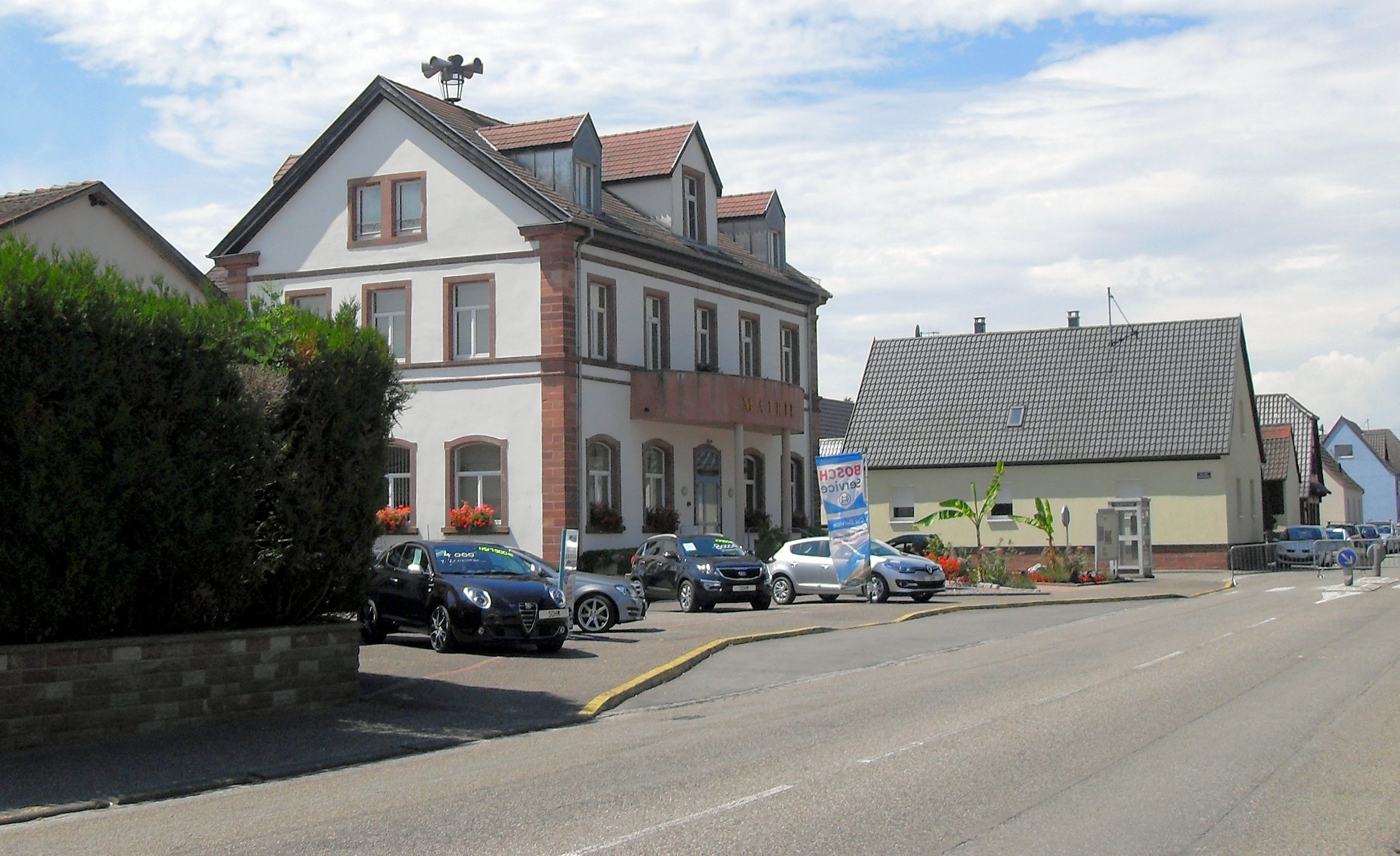
- The town hall in Schirrhein

- Coat of arms
- Location of Schirrhein
- Location within France Location within Grand Est
- Coordinates: 48°48′08″N 7°54′25″E
- Country: France
- Region: Grand Est
- Department: Bas-Rhin
- Arrondissement: Haguenau-Wissembourg
- Canton: Bischwiller
- Intercommunality: CA Haguenau

Government
  - Mayor (2020–2026): Patrick Schott
- Area^{1}: 6.49 km^{2} (2.51 sq mi)
- Highest elevation: 141 m (463 ft)
- Lowest elevation: 118 m (387 ft)
- Population (2023): 2,251
  - Density: 347/km^{2} (898/sq mi)
- Time zone: UTC+01:00 (CET)
  - Summer (DST): UTC+02:00 (CEST)
- INSEE/Postal code: 67449 /67240
- ^{1} French Land Register data, which excludes lakes, ponds, glaciers > 1 km^{2} (0.386 sq mi or 247 acres) and river estuaries.

Schirrhein (French pronunciation: [ʃiʁain]) is a commune in the Bas-Rhin department in Grand Est in northeastern France.

== Population ==
Historical population
Year	Pop.	±% p.a.
1968	1,882	—
1975	1,987	+0.78%
1982	1,921	−0.48%
1990	1,850	−0.47%
1999	2,027	+1.02%
2007	2,145	+0.71%
2012	2,205	+0.55%
2017	2,227	+0.20%
2023	2,251	+0.18%
Source: INSEE

== See also ==
- Communes of the Bas-Rhin department
