= Wintershouse =

- Commune
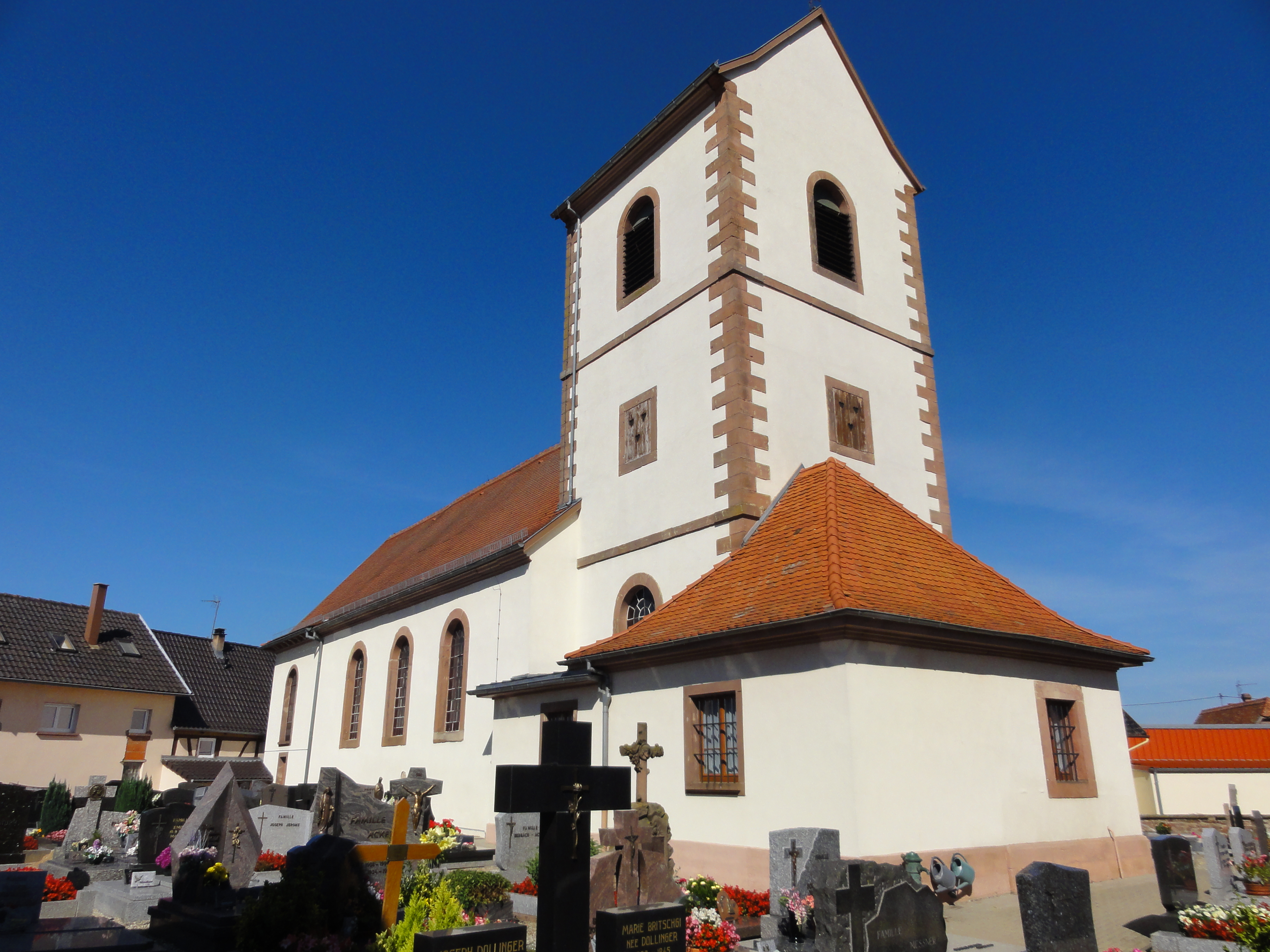
- The church in Wintershouse

- Coat of arms
- Location of Wintershouse
- Location within France Location within Grand Est
- Coordinates: 48°47′36″N 7°42′06″E
- Country: France
- Region: Grand Est
- Department: Bas-Rhin
- Arrondissement: Haguenau-Wissembourg
- Canton: Haguenau
- Intercommunality: Haguenau

Government
  - Mayor (2020–2026): Christine Ott-Dollinger
- Area^{1}: 3.66 km^{2} (1.41 sq mi)
- Elevation: 220 m (720 ft)
- Highest elevation: 217 m (712 ft)
- Lowest elevation: 162 m (531 ft)
- Population (2023): 869
  - Density: 237/km^{2} (615/sq mi)
- Time zone: UTC+01:00 (CET)
  - Summer (DST): UTC+02:00 (CEST)
- INSEE/Postal code: 67540 /67590
- ^{1} French Land Register data, which excludes lakes, ponds, glaciers > 1 km^{2} (0.386 sq mi or 247 acres) and river estuaries.

Wintershouse (German: Wintershausen) is a commune in the Bas-Rhin department in Grand Est in north-eastern France.

== Population ==
Historical population
Year	Pop.	±% p.a.
1968	366	—
1975	415	+1.81%
1982	421	+0.21%
1990	517	+2.60%
1999	613	+1.91%
2007	787	+3.17%
2012	895	+2.61%
2017	894	−0.02%
2023	869	−0.47%
Source: INSEE

== See also ==
- Communes of the Bas-Rhin department
