= Ohlungen =

Ohlungen Ohlunge
- Commune
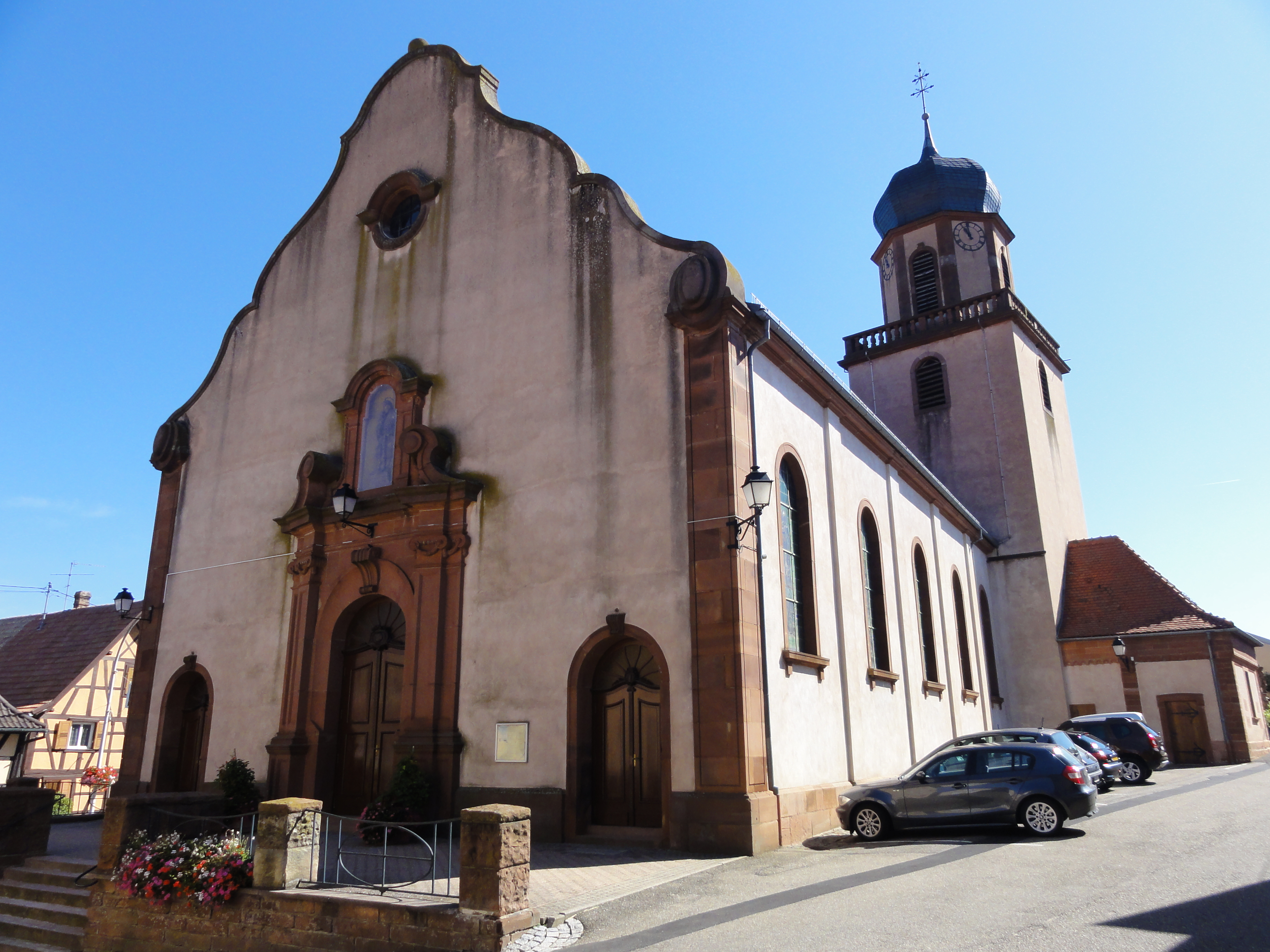
- The church in Ohlungen

- Coat of arms
- Location of Ohlungen
- Location within France Location within Grand Est
- Coordinates: 48°48′43″N 7°42′06″E
- Country: France
- Region: Grand Est
- Department: Bas-Rhin
- Arrondissement: Haguenau-Wissembourg
- Canton: Haguenau
- Intercommunality: CA Haguenau

Government
  - Mayor (2026–32): Daniel Klieber
- Area^{1}: 8.39 km^{2} (3.24 sq mi)
- Highest elevation: 236 m (774 ft)
- Lowest elevation: 152 m (499 ft)
- Population (2023): 1,418
  - Density: 169/km^{2} (438/sq mi)
- Time zone: UTC+01:00 (CET)
  - Summer (DST): UTC+02:00 (CEST)
- INSEE/Postal code: 67359 /67590
- ^{1} French Land Register data, which excludes lakes, ponds, glaciers > 1 km^{2} (0.386 sq mi or 247 acres) and river estuaries.

Ohlungen (French pronunciation: [oluŋ(ɡ)ən]) is a commune in the Bas-Rhin department in Grand Est in north-eastern France.

== History ==
Ohlungen was an Imperial Village (Reichsdorf) of the Holy Roman Empire. Within its jurisdiction was a former Imperial Hamlet (Reichsweiler) called Keffendorf. Both passed to France in the Peace of Westphalia in 1648. In November 1944, German occupiers expelled around 10% of the village population in anticipation of severe fighting in the area.

== See also ==
- Communes of the Bas-Rhin department
