= Hegeney =

Hegeney Hajenai
- Commune
- Coat of arms
- Location of Hegeney
- Location within France Location within Grand Est
- Coordinates: 48°53′28″N 7°44′30″E
- Country: France
- Region: Grand Est
- Department: Bas-Rhin
- Arrondissement: Haguenau-Wissembourg
- Canton: Reichshoffen

Government
  - Mayor (2020–2026): Roger Isel
- Area^{1}: 1.76 km^{2} (0.68 sq mi)
- Highest elevation: 209 m (686 ft)
- Lowest elevation: 165 m (541 ft)
- Population (2023): 437
  - Density: 248/km^{2} (643/sq mi)
- Time zone: UTC+01:00 (CET)
  - Summer (DST): UTC+02:00 (CEST)
- INSEE/Postal code: 67186 /67360
- ^{1} French Land Register data, which excludes lakes, ponds, glaciers > 1 km^{2} (0.386 sq mi or 247 acres) and river estuaries.

Hegeney (also spelled Hégeney) is a commune in the Bas-Rhin department in Grand Est in north-eastern France.

== Geography ==
Hégeney is positioned to the north of Haguenau approximately halfway to Wœrth along the departmental road RD27. The landscape is of gently rolling hills, with the topography becoming more uneven towards the Vosges Mountains some twenty kilometres (twelve miles) to the west, and the land becoming eventually a little flatter towards the River Rhine some twenty kilometres (twelve miles) to the east. To the south and south-west Hégeney is bordered by the little River Eberbach, a tributary of the Sauer.

== History ==
The earliest archaeological find here is a large Bronze Age axe, weighing half a kilogramme (one pound). Found at the edge of the commune, it is now on display at a museum in Haguenau. Coins and other artefacts from the second and third centuries have also been found at the adjacent hamlet known as Wasserrut, beside the known route of a Roman age road that connected Morsbronn with Laubach.

The Abbey of Wissembourg, founded around 660, enjoyed the support of the Merovingian kings and received grants of land from a number of districts. In 742 it is recorded that Duke Liutfrid of Alsace donated to the abbey four farms at Heconheim (modern Hégeney). In 786 the site appears under the patronage of Aginoni Villa (the farm of Aginon)

In 1280, with the establishment of the Imperial Bailiwick of Haguenau, the settlement of Heckenheim, which found itself within the Imperial Bailiwick, gained the rights and privileges of an imperially dependent village, together with the neighbouring village of Eschbach in the provostship of Forstheim.

There is a record of the town of Haguenau having confiscated the villagers' horses and cattle on Friday, 11 August 1368.

During the Thirty Years' War, the village was torched by Swedish troops. After the end of the war, the French state progressively tightened its control over the Imperial Bailiwick. In due course the lands were granted in fief to the Duke of Mazarin (not to be confused with Cardinal Mazarin whose niece the duke had married). The royal village of Hégeney thereafter belonged to the duke's heirs right up till the end of the ancien regime.

== Landmarks ==
- The church of Saint Margaret dates from 1769. The organ casing is the work of Messrs Moeller, organ builders of Oberbronn. The windows date from 1949 and were among the first works of master craftsman Tristan Ruhlmann.
- The public fountain in the village square was originally sourced using a 350 m channel of hollowed out tree trunks running beside the street.
- the 'Lion Head' sculpture found at the edge of the Roman period road, thought originally to have come from the old Villa Aginoni, has been incorporated into the wall of a stone barn at Rue du Verger No. 8.

== See also ==
- Communes of the Bas-Rhin department
