= Oberdorf =

Oberdorf or Oberdorff may refer to:

== People ==
- Lena Oberdorf (born 2001), German footballer
- Tim Oberdorf (born 1996), German footballer

== Places ==
=== Austria ===
- Oberdorf am Hochegg, a municipality in the district of Feldbach in Styria
- Oberdorf im Burgenland, a town in the district of Oberwart in Burgenland

=== France ===
- Oberdorf, Haut-Rhin, a commune in the Haut-Rhin department in Alsace
- Oberdorf-Spachbach, a community in the Bas-Rhin department in Alsace
- Oberdorff, a commune in the Moselle department in Lorraine

=== Germany ===
- Oberdorf, the historic name for the town of Marktoberdorf, Bavaria
- Oberdorf am Ipf, a suburb of the city of Bopfingen in Baden-Württemberg

=== Switzerland ===
- Oberdorf, Basel-Landschaft, a municipality in the Basel-Landschaft canton
- Oberdorf, Nidwalden, a municipality in the Nidwalden canton
- Oberdorf, Solothurn, a municipality in the Solothurn canton
- Oberdorf (Zürich), part of the old town in the city of Zürich

=== Russia ===
- Oberdorf, a historic Volga German colony in modern-day Kuptsovo

== See also ==
- Oberndorf (disambiguation)
- Oberstdorf
