= Battle of Wörth =

Part of the Franco-Prussian War

Coordinates: 48°56′20″N 7°44′00″E

Battle of Wœrth/Frœschwiller
- Part of the Franco-Prussian War
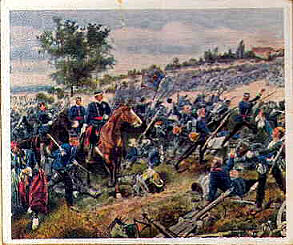
Date	6 August 1870
Location	Frœschwiller, Wœrth (Wörth), France
Result	German victory

Belligerents
(German Empire) North German Confederation: Prussia; Baden; Bavaria (Kingdom of Württemberg) Württemberg	Second French Empire

Commanders and leaders
(Kingdom of Prussia) Frederick William	(Second French Empire) Patrice de Mac-Mahon

Units involved
Third Army	I Corps

Strength
125,000; 342 guns	46,500; 167 guns

Casualties and losses
10,549 men: 1,586 killed (Note: 103 officers and 1,483 soldiers); 7,590 wounded; 1,373 missing; 341 horses	15,096 men: 5,884 dead or wounded; 9,212 missing or captured; 28 guns
- Grand Est Region

The Battle of Wörth, also known as the Battle of Reichshoffen or as the Battle of Frœschwiller, refers to the second battle of Wörth, which took place on 6 August 1870 in the opening stages of the Franco-Prussian War (the first Battle of Wörth occurred on 23 December 1793 during the French Revolutionary Wars). In the second battle, troops from Germany commanded by Crown Prince Frederick William and directed by his chief of staff, General Leonhard Graf von Blumenthal, defeated the French under Marshal MacMahon near the village of Wœrth in Alsace, on the Sauer River, 10 kilometres (6.2 mi) north of Haguenau.

== Prelude ==
During 5 August 1870, the French were concentrated in a selected position running nearly north and south along the western banks of the Sauer on the left front of the German Third Army, which was moving south in an attempt to find them. The French position was marked from right to left by Morsbronn, the Niederwald, the heights west of Wœrth and the woods northeast of Frœschwiller.

East of the Sauer the German Third Army was moving south towards Haguenau, when their cavalry found the French position about noon. Thereafter the German vedettes held the French under close observation, while the latter moved about within their lines and as far as the village of Wœrth as if in peace, notwithstanding the defeat of a portion of the French army at the Battle of Wissembourg on the previous day. The remnant of the force which had been engaged there, with many of its wounded still in the ranks, marched in about noon with so soldierly a bearing that, so far from their depressing the morale of the rest, their appearance actually raised it.

About 17:00 the French watered some horses at the Sauer as if in peace, without escort, though hostile scouts were in sight. A sudden swoop of German hussars drove the party back to camp. The alarm sounded, tents were struck and the troops fell in all along the line and remained under arms until the confusion died down when orders were sent to fall out, but not to pitch tents. The army therefore bivouacked; but for this incident, the battle of the next day would probably not have been fought. A sudden and violent storm broke over the bivouacs, and when it was over, the men, wet and restless, began to move about, light fires, etc. Many of them broke camp and went into Wœrth, which was unoccupied, though Prussians were only 300 meters from the sentries. These fired, and the officer commanding the Prussian outposts, hearing the confused murmur of voices, ordered up a battery which, as soon as there was enough light, fired several shells into Wœrth. The stragglers rushed back, the French lines were again alarmed, and several batteries on the French side took up the challenge.

== Battle ==
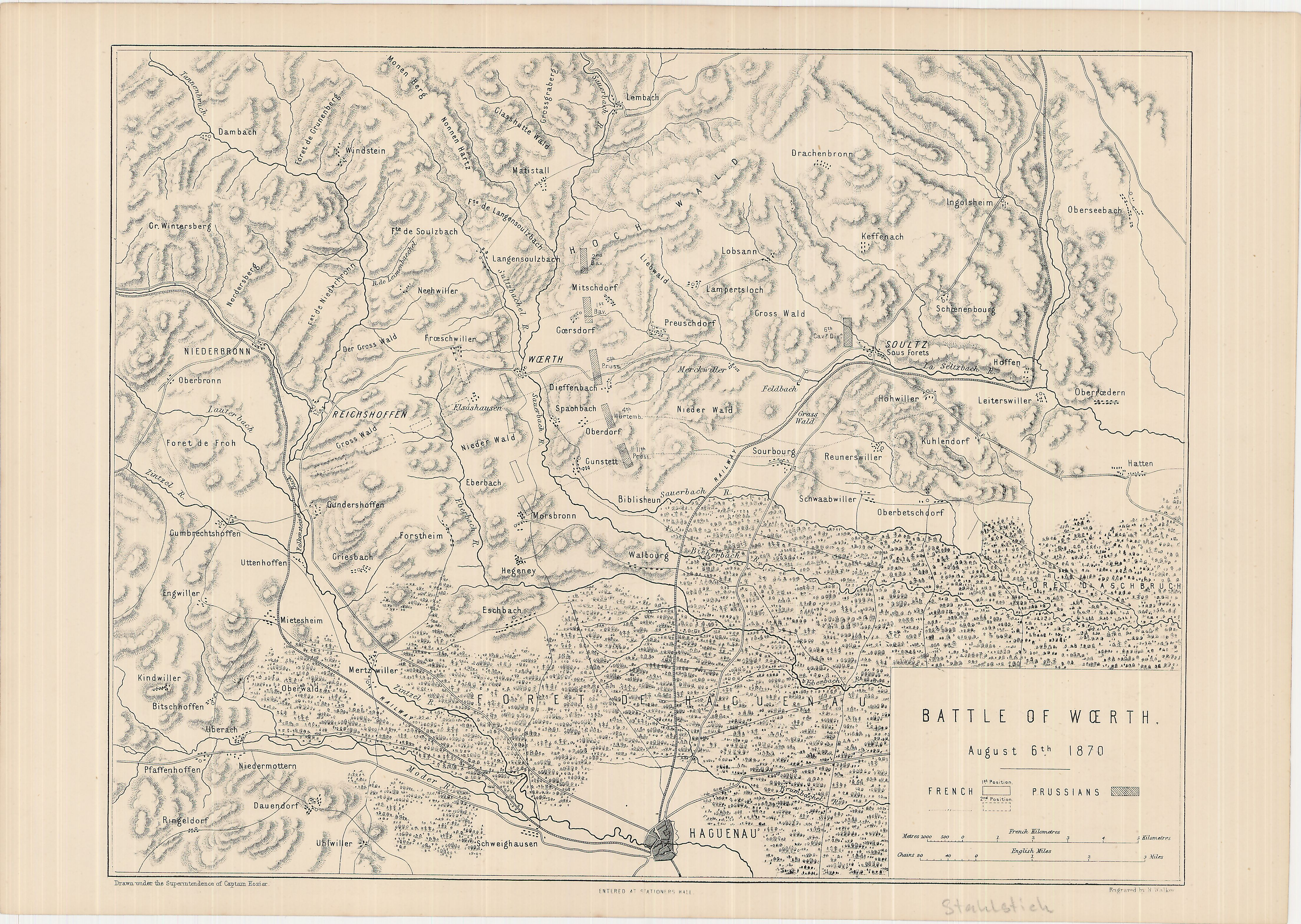
Battle of Wörth, 1870 (general overview)

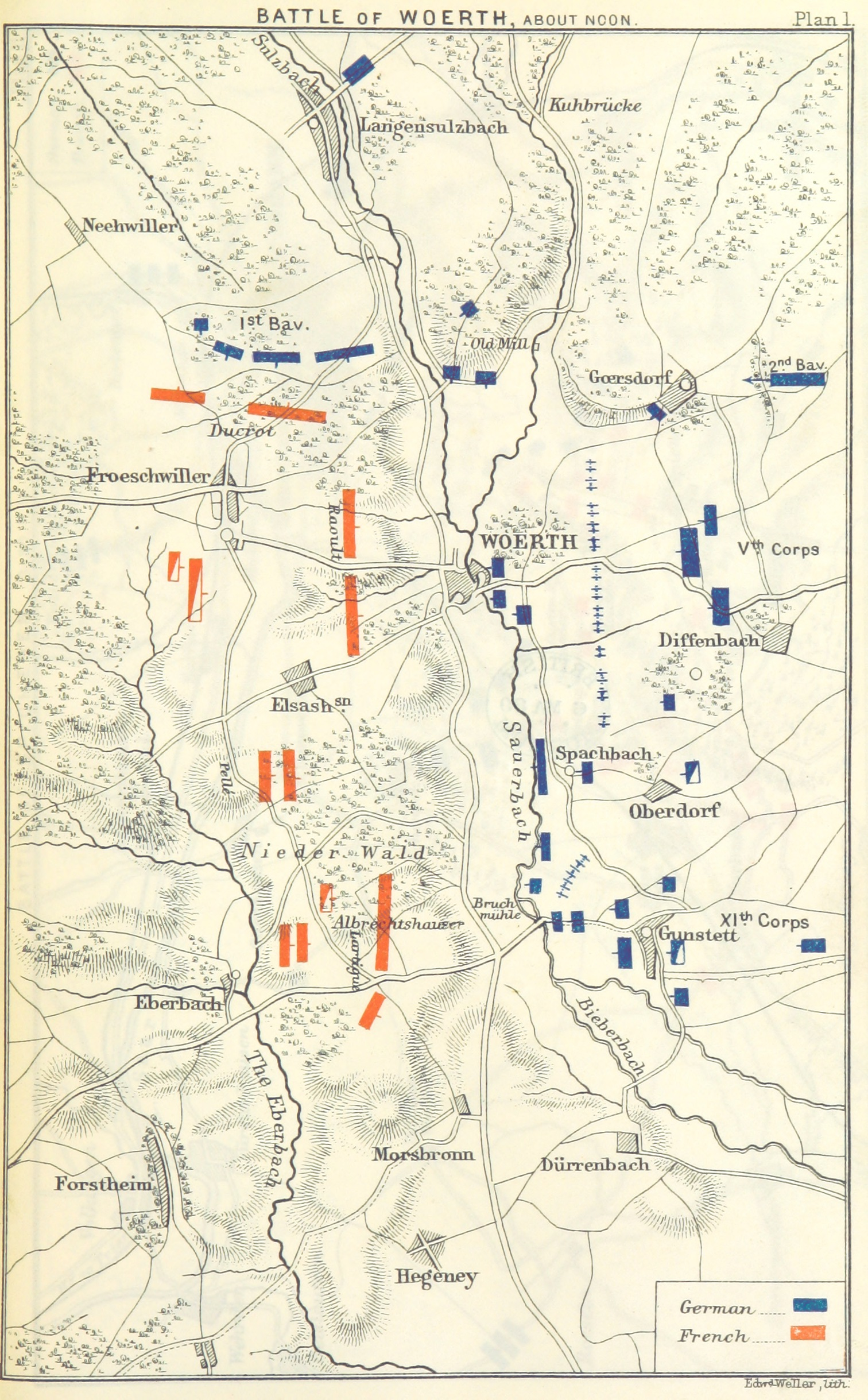
Situation at noon.

=== Bavarian II Corps ===
The Prussian guns, strict orders having been given to avoid all engagement that day, soon withdrew and were about to return to camp, when renewed artillery fire was heard from the south, and presently also from the north. In the latter direction, the II Bavarian Corps, led by Jakob von Hartmann, had bivouacked along the Mattstall–Langen–Sulzbach road with orders to continue the march if artillery were heard to the south. This order was contrary to the spirit of the Third Army orders; moreover, the V Prussian Corps to the south was in ignorance of its having been given.

The outpost battery near Wörth was heard and the Bavarians at once moved forward. Soon the leading troops were on the crest of the ridge between the Sauer and the Sulzbach, and the Bavarian divisional commander, anxious to prove his loyalty to his new allies—his enemies in 1866–ordered his troops to attack, giving the spire of Frœschwiller, which was visible over the woods, as the point of direction.

=== Prussian V Corps ===
The French, however, were quite ready and a furious fusillade broke out, the sound being multiplied out of proportion to the numbers engaged by the echoes of the forest-clad hills. The Prussian officers of the V Corps near Dieffenbach, knowing nothing of the orders the Bavarians had received, were amazed; but at length, at about 10:30 h, when their comrades were seen retiring, in some cases in great disorder, the corps commander, General Hugo von Kirchbach, decided that an effort must at once be made to relieve the Bavarians. His chief of staff had already ordered up the divisional and corps artillery (84 guns in all), and he himself communicated his intention of attacking to the XI Corps (General Julius von Bose) on his left and asked for all available assistance. A report was also dispatched to the crown prince at Sulz, 8 kilometres (5.0 mi) away.

Meanwhile, the Prussian XI Corps had become involved in an engagement. The left of the V Corps' outposts had overnight occupied Gunstett and the bank of the Sauer, and the French, shortly after daylight on 6 August 1870, sent down an unarmed party to fetch water. As this appeared through the mist, the Prussians naturally fired upon it, and the French General Lartigue (to whose division the party belonged), puzzled to account for the firing, brought up some batteries in readiness to repel an attack. These fired a few rounds only, but remained in position as a precaution.

=== Prussian XI Corps ===
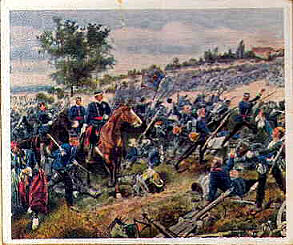
Württemberg troops attack at Wœrth.

Hearing the firing, the XI Corps advanced guard, which had marched up behind in accordance with the general movement of the corps in changing front to the west, and had halted on reaching the Kreuzhecke Wood, promptly came up to Spachbach and Gunstett. In this movement across the country to Spachbach some bodies appear to have exposed themselves, for French artillery at Elsasshausen suddenly opened fire, and the shrapnel bursting high sent showers of bullets on the house roofs of Spachbach, in which village a French battalion had just halted. As the falling tiles made the position undesirable, the major in command ordered the march to be resumed, and as he gave the order, his horse ran away with him towards the Sauer. The leading company, seeing the battalion commander gallop, moved off at the double, and the others of course followed. Coming within sight of the enemy, they drew heavy shellfire, and, still under the impression that they were intended to attack, deployed into a line of columns and doubled down to the river, which they crossed. One or two companies in the neighborhood had already begun to do so, and the stream is too wide for the mounted officers to jump, presently eight or ten companies were across the river and out of superior control. By this time the French outposts (some 1500 rifles), lining the edge of the Niederwald, were firing heavily. The line of smoke was naturally accepted by all as the objective, and the German companies with a wild rush reached the edge of the wood.

The same thing had happened at Gunstett. A most obstinate struggle ensued and both sides brought up reinforcements. The Prussians, with all their attention, concentrated on the wood in their front, and having as yet no superior commanders, soon exhibited signs of confusion, and thereupon General Lartigue ordered a counterattack towards the heights of Gunstett, before which all the Prussians between the Niederwald and the Sauer gave way. The French followed with a rush, and, fording the Sauer opposite Gunstett, for a moment put the long line of German guns upon the heights in considerable danger. At this crisis, a fresh battalion of the Prussian XI corps arrived by the road from Surbourg to Gunstett and attacked the French on one flank whilst the guns swept the other. The momentum of the charge died out, and the French drifted backward. The French effort compelled the admiration of both sides.

=== Prussian V Corps ===
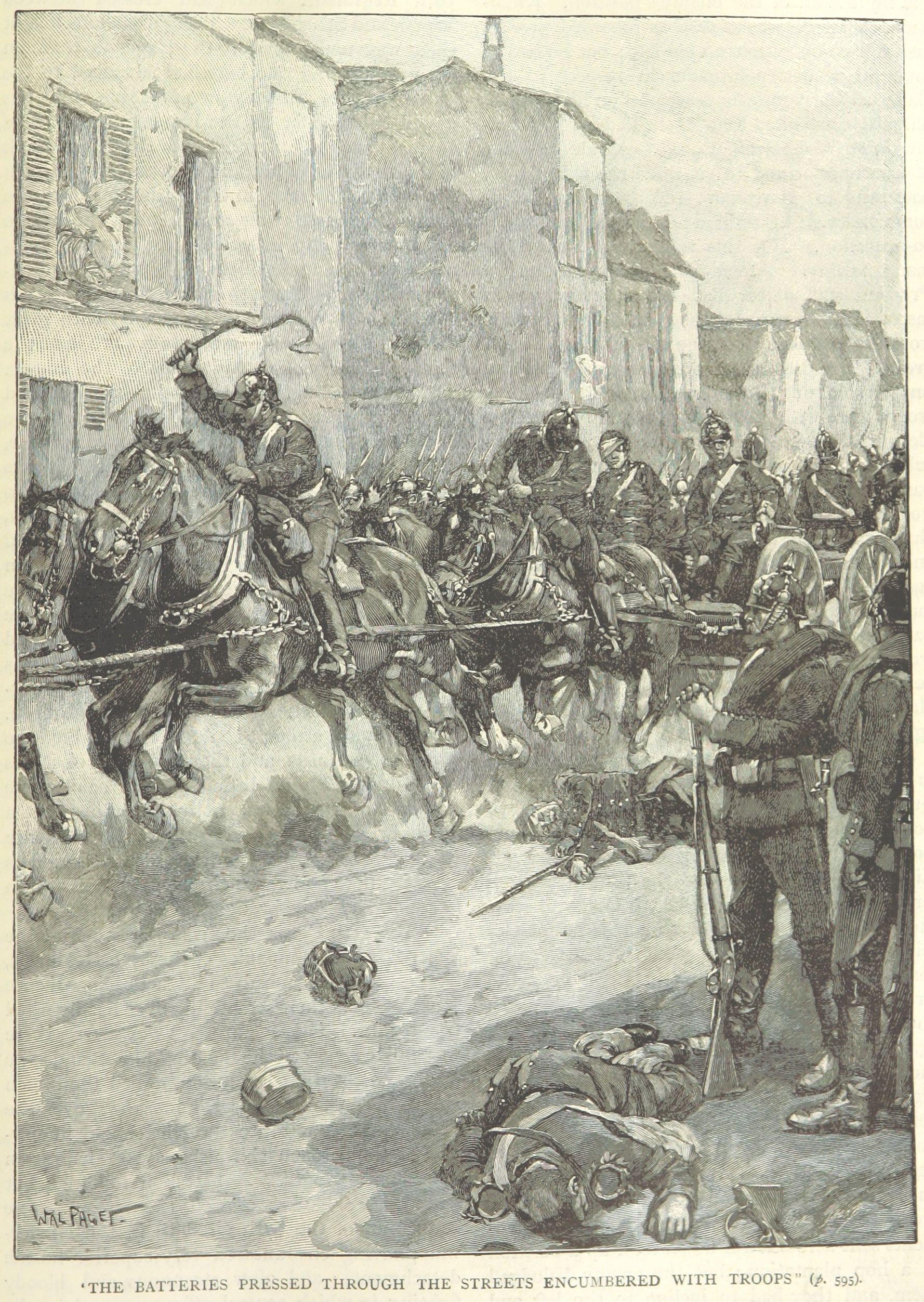
Prussian V Corp artillery advances through the streets of Wörth

In the center, the fight had been going badly for the V corps. As soon as the 84 guns between Dieffenbach and Spachbach opened fire, the French disappeared from sight. There was no longer a target, and, perhaps to compel his adversary to show himself, von Kirchbach ordered four battalions to cross the river. These battalions, however, were widely separated and came under fire as soon as they appeared. They attacked in two groups, one from Wœrth towards Frœschwiller, the other from near Spachbach towards the Calvary spur, east of Elsasshausen. Both were overpowered by French infantry fire. A fraction of the southern party maintained itself all day in the elbow of the Hagenau Chaussee, which formed a starting point for subsequent attacks. But the rest were driven back in great confusion. Once more the dashing counter-attack of the French was thrown into confusion by Prussian shell fire, and as the French fell back, the Prussian infantry, now reinforced, followed them up (about 13:00 h). The commander in chief of the German Third Army (Crown Prince Frederick William) now appeared on the field and ordered Kirchbach to stand fast until the pressure of the XI corps and of the Württemberg division could take effect against the French right-wing. The majority of these troops had not yet reached the field. Von Bose, however, seeing the retreat of the troops of the V Corps, had independently determined to renew the attack against the Niederwald with much of his forces as had arrived, and had ordered General von Schkopp's brigade, which was then approaching, to join the troops collecting to the east of Gunstett. Schkopp, however, seeing that his present line of advance led him directly onto the French right about Morsbronn and kept him clear of the confusion to be seen around Gunstett, disregarded the order and continued to advance on Morsbronn. This deliberate acceptance of responsibility really decided the battle, for Schkopp's brigade quietly deployed as a unit and compelled the French right-wing to fall back.

=== French cavalry ===
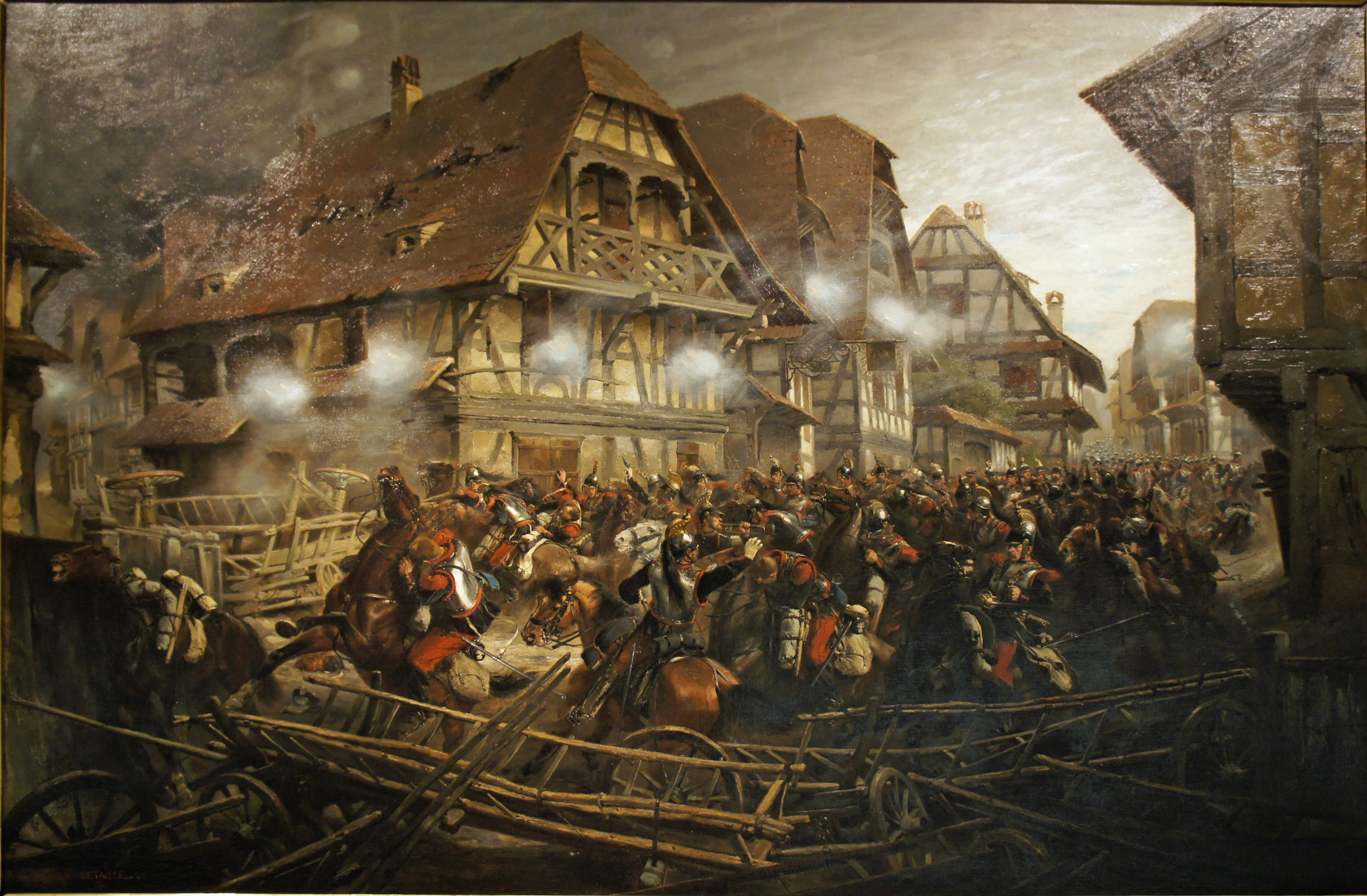
French 9th Cuirassiers trapped in Morsbronn-les-Bains.

To cover the French retreat General Michel's brigade of cavalry was ordered to charge. The order was somewhat vague, and in his position under cover near Eberbach-Seltz, General Michel had no knowledge of the actual situation. Thus it came about that, without reconnoitering or manoeuvering for position, the French cavalry rode straight at the first objective which offered itself, and struck the victorious Prussians as they were crossing the hills between the Albrechtshäuserhof and Morsbronn. Hence the charge was costly and only partly successful. However, the Prussians were ridden down here and there, and their attention was sufficiently absorbed while the French infantry rallied for a fresh counterstrike. This was made about 13:20 h. The Prussians were driven off the hillsides between the Albrechtshäuserhof and Morsbronn which they had already won. But the counter-attack turned into disaster when 700 French cuirassiers were trapped inside Morsbronn and massacred within a few minutes by rapid close-range fire. The rest of the French cavalry eventually came under fire from the great artillery mass above Gunstett; von Bose having at length concentrated the main body of the XI corps in the meadows between the Niederwald and the Sauer, the French had to withdraw. Their withdrawal involved the retreat of the troops who had fought all day in defence of the Niederwald.

=== French counter-attack ===
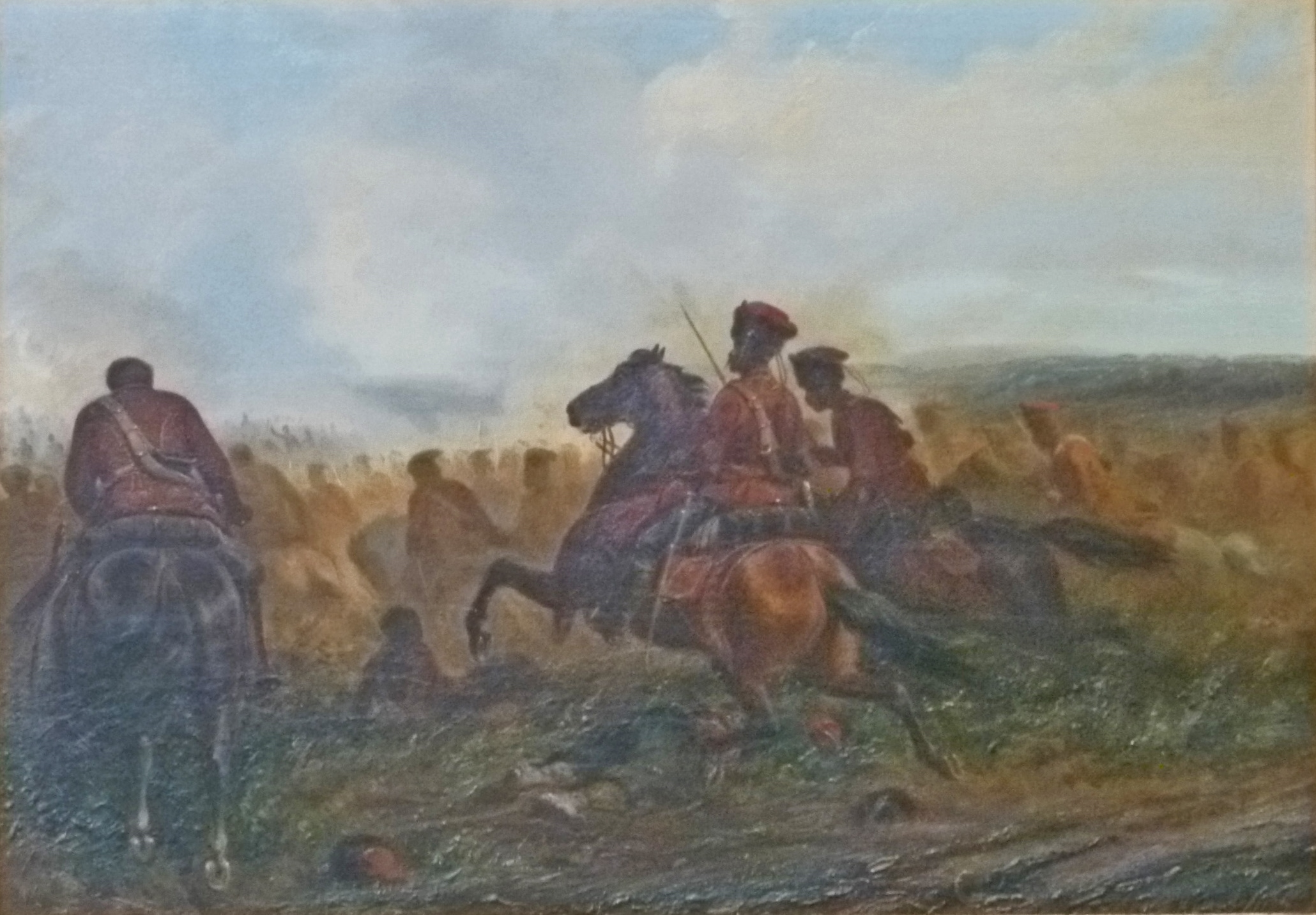
Charge of the Hussards of the Prussian Guard, painting by Jules van Imschoot

By 15:00 h the Prussians were masters of the Niederwald and the ground south of it on which the French right-wing had originally stood, but they were in indescribable confusion after the prolonged fighting in the dense undergrowth. Before order could be restored the French launched another fierce counterstroke. As the Prussians emerged from the north edge of the wood, the French reserves suddenly emerged from behind the Elsasshausen heights and striking due south drove the Prussians back. It was a grave crisis, but at this moment von Schkopp, who throughout all this had kept two of his battalions intact, came around the northwest corner of the Wald, and these fresh battalions again brought the French to a standstill. Meanwhile, von Kirchbach, seeing the progress of the XI Corps, had ordered the whole of his command forward to assault the French center; away to the right the two Bavarian corps moved against the French left, which still maintained its original position in the woods northeast of Frœschwiller.

MacMahon, however, was not beaten yet. Ordering Bonnemains's cavalry division to charge by squadrons to gain time, he brought up his reserve artillery, and sent it forward to case-shot range to cover a final counter-stroke by his last intact battalions. But from his position near Frœschwiller he could not see into the hollow between Elsasshausen and the Niederwald. The order came too late, and the artillery unlimbered just as the aforementioned counter-attack on the Niederwald gave way before von Schkopp's reserve. The guns were submerged in a flood of fugitives and pursuers. Elsasshausen passed into the hands of the Germans. To rescue the guns, the nearest French infantry attacked in a succession of groups, charging at bayonet-point with the utmost determination. The Prussians immediately in front gave way to each attack, but those on the flanks swung inwards and under this converging fire each French attempt died out, the Prussians following up the French retreat. In this manner, step by step, in confusion which almost defies analysis, the Prussians conquered the whole of the ground to the south of the Frœschwiller-Wœrth road, but the French still held on in the village of Frœschwiller itself and in the woods to the north of the road, where throughout the day they had held the two Bavarian corps in check with little difficulty. To break down this last stronghold, the guns of the Prussian V and XI Corps, which had now come forward to the captured ridge of Elsasshausen, took the village as their target; the great mass of infantry, now flushed with victory but in the direst confusion, encouraged by the example of two horse artillery batteries which galloped boldly forward to case-shot range, delivered one final rush which swept all resistance before it.

=== French retreat ===
The battle was won, and cavalry only were needed to reap its consequences, but the Prussian cavalry division had been left behind without orders and did not reach the battlefield until late at night. The divisional cavalry squadrons did their best, but each pursued on its own account, and the results in prisoners and guns taken fell far short of what the opportunity offered. The French, under cover of darkness, escaped, and on the following day the Prussian cavalry division was quite unable to discover the direction of the retreat.

== Aftermath ==
=== Analysis ===
MacMahon received no support from the neighbouring French troops. The battle was won by overpowering weight of numbers: the Prussian general staff were able to field no fewer than 75,000 infantry, 6000 cavalry, and 300 guns, of which 71,000 rifles, 4250 sabers, and 234 guns came into action, against 32,000 rifles, 4850 sabers and 101 guns on the French side. The superiority of the French chassepot over the Prussian needle guns was canceled by the higher number of rifles on the German side; although the Prussians could generally use their numerical superiority to bring a converging fire upon the French, the latter made nearly twice the number of hits for about the same weight of ammunition fired. The French, however, had no answer to the superior German artillery, and in almost every instance it was the terrible shellfire that broke up French counterattacks. All of these attacks were in the highest degree honorable to the French army, and many came closer to foiling the ultimate success of the Germans than was supposed.

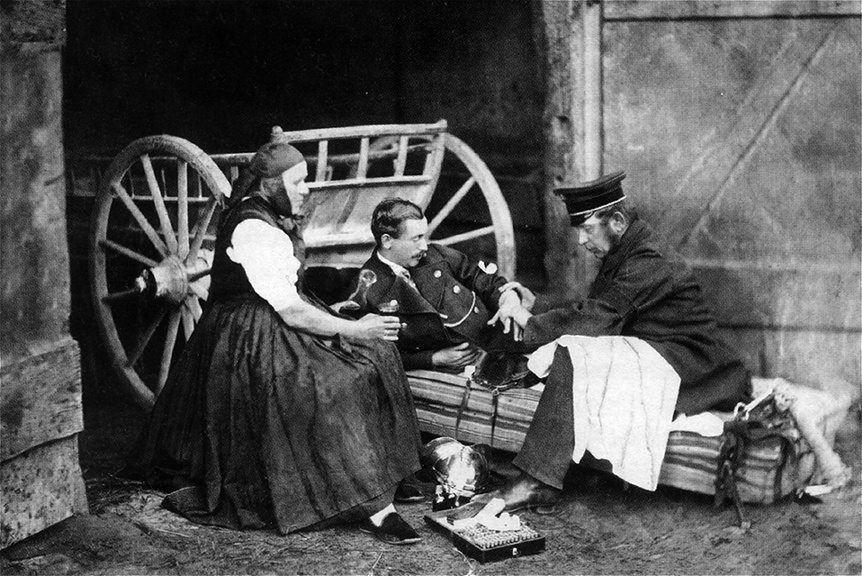
Medic and German officer after the battle of Wörth

=== Casualties ===
The Germans lost 103 officers and 1,483 men killed, 383 officers and 7,207 men wounded and 1,373 men missing. Horse casualties amounted to 341. The French lost 5,884 men killed and wounded, and perhaps 9,212 captured, representing a total loss of about 32%. Some French regiments retained a semblance of discipline after suffering enormous losses. The 2nd Turcos lost 93%, 13th Hussars 87%, 3rd Zouaves 80%, and thirteen regiments in all lost over 50% of their strength. Frederick William's army captured 200 officers, 9,000 enlisted men, 1 eagle, 4 Turco standards, 28 guns, 5 mitrailleuses, 91 limbers, 23 wagons of rifles and side arms, 158 other carriages and 1,193 horses.

== See also ==
- Pascal Olivier Count de Negroni

== Sources ==
- German General Staff (1881). The Franco-German War 1870–71: Part 1; Volume 1 (2nd ed.). London: Clowes & Sons.
- Clodfelter, M. (2008). Warfare and armed conflicts : a statistical encyclopedia of casualty and other figures, 1494–2007. Jefferson, North Carolina: McFarland. ISBN 978-0786433193.
- Grant, R. G. (2017). 1001 Battles That Changed the Course of History. Chartwell Books. ISBN 978-0785835530.

Attribution:

- Endnotes:
  - See the French and German official histories of the war;
  - Bonnal, H. (1899). Froschwiller.
  - Kunz, H. (1891). Schlacht von Wörth.
  - Kunz, H. Kriegsgesch. Beispiele.
  - Tournès, R. De Gunstett au Niederwald and Le Calvaire.
  - Commandant Grange (1908–1910). "Les Réalités du champ de bataille". Revue d'infanterie.
