= Gunstett =

Gunstett Gunschtett
- Commune
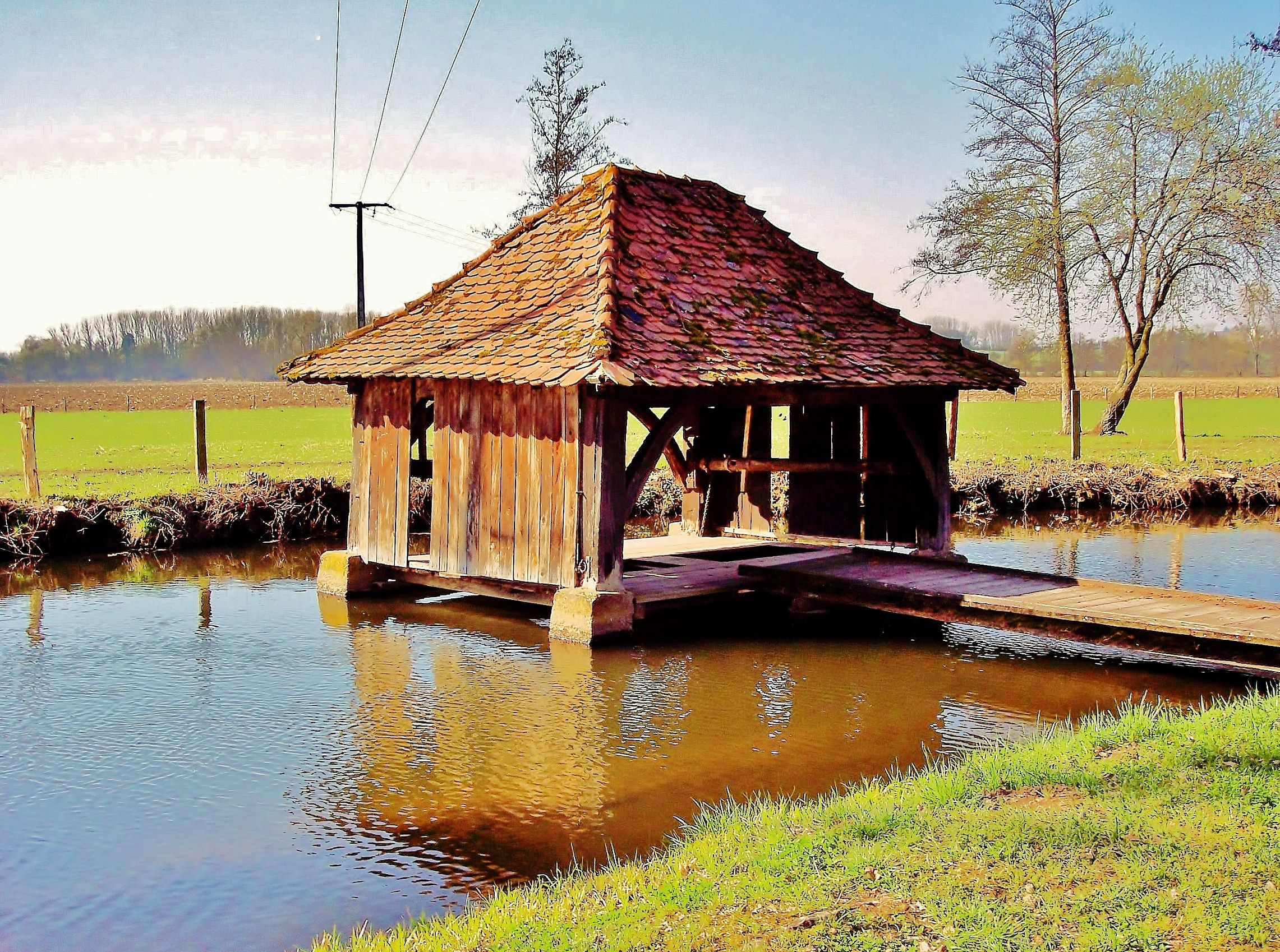
- The wash house in the Sauer river in Gunstett

- Coat of arms
- Location of Gunstett
- Location within France Location within Grand Est
- Coordinates: 48°54′56″N 7°45′53″E
- Country: France
- Region: Grand Est
- Department: Bas-Rhin
- Arrondissement: Haguenau-Wissembourg
- Canton: Reichshoffen

Government
  - Mayor (2020–2026): Monique Meyer
- Area^{1}: 6.3 km^{2} (2.4 sq mi)
- Highest elevation: 222 m (728 ft)
- Lowest elevation: 152 m (499 ft)
- Population (2023): 633
  - Density: 100/km^{2} (260/sq mi)
- Time zone: UTC+01:00 (CET)
  - Summer (DST): UTC+02:00 (CEST)
- INSEE/Postal code: 67177 /67360
- ^{1} French Land Register data, which excludes lakes, ponds, glaciers > 1 km^{2} (0.386 sq mi or 247 acres) and river estuaries.

Gunstett is a commune in the Bas-Rhin department in Grand Est in north-eastern France.

== Geography ==
The village is positioned slightly to the east of the Departmental Road RD27, a short distance north of Haguenau. The surrounding countryside is dominated by arable agriculture: the soil type is alluvial, reflecting the proximity of the river Rhine to the east.

Neighbouring villages are Oberdorf to the north, Biblisheim to the south-east, Durrenbach to the south, Morsbronn-les-Bains to the south-south-west and the formerly independent commune of Eberbach-Woerth to the West.

== Points of interest ==
- The Pear Conservation Orchard comprises 300 trees of 250 different varieties.
- St Michael's Church contains an organ built in 1857 by Seltz organ builder Joseph Stiehr.
- Public wash house.

== See also ==
- Communes of the Bas-Rhin department
