= Oberndorff =

Oberndorff may refer to

Oberndorff

- Adolph von Asch zu Asch auf Oberndorff (1839–1906), Bavarian soldier
- Alfred von Oberndorff (1870–1963)

== See also ==
- Oberndorf (disambiguation)
