= Langensoultzbach =

Langensoultzbach Làngesulzbàch
- Commune
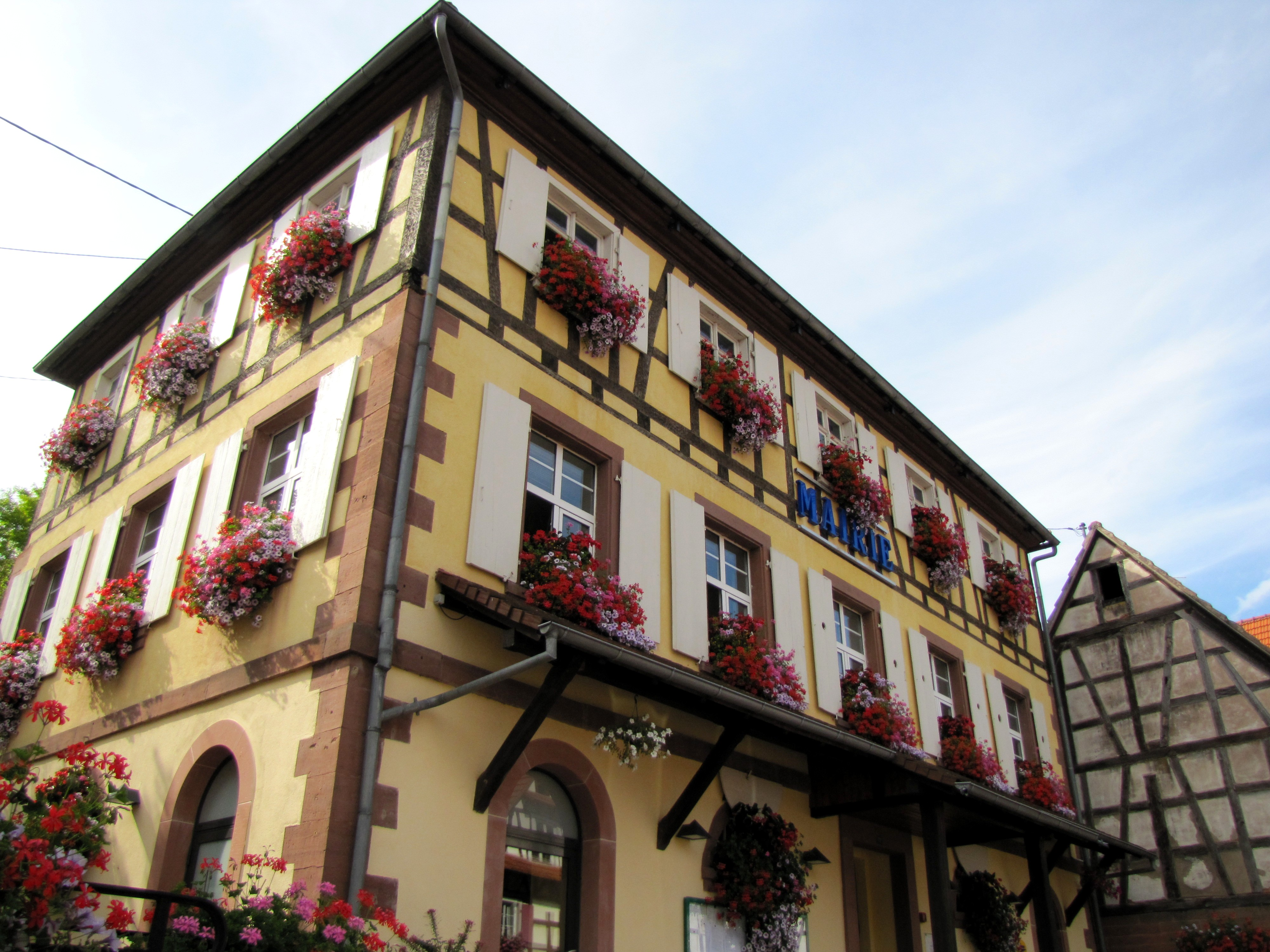
- The town hall in Langensoultzbach

- Coat of arms
- Location of Langensoultzbach
- Location within France Location within Grand Est
- Coordinates: 48°58′05″N 7°44′08″E
- Country: France
- Region: Grand Est
- Department: Bas-Rhin
- Arrondissement: Haguenau-Wissembourg
- Canton: Reichshoffen

Government
  - Mayor (2020–2026): Evelyne Ledig
- Area^{1}: 13.09 km^{2} (5.05 sq mi)
- Highest elevation: 411 m (1,348 ft)
- Lowest elevation: 177 m (581 ft)
- Population (2023): 904
  - Density: 69.1/km^{2} (179/sq mi)
- Time zone: UTC+01:00 (CET)
  - Summer (DST): UTC+02:00 (CEST)
- INSEE/Postal code: 67259 /67360
- ^{1} French Land Register data, which excludes lakes, ponds, glaciers > 1 km^{2} (0.386 sq mi or 247 acres) and river estuaries.

Langensoultzbach (German: Langensulzbach) is a commune in the Bas-Rhin department in Grand Est in north-eastern France.

The commune is part of the Palatinate Forest-North Vosges Biosphere Reserve.

== Geography ==
The village is some twenty kilometres (twelve miles) to the south-west of Wissembourg and the closest crossings of the Franco-German frontier reachable on a classified road. Slightly more direct and shorter routes to Germany may be available to hikers.

The village is a couple of kilometres from departmental road RD 27, which runs between the villages of Lembach and Wœrth, beyond which it continues to Haguenau. The heart of the village is set in farmland, although most of the surrounding countryside is still made up of woodland.

== See also ==
- Communes of the Bas-Rhin department
