= Zinswiller =

- Commune
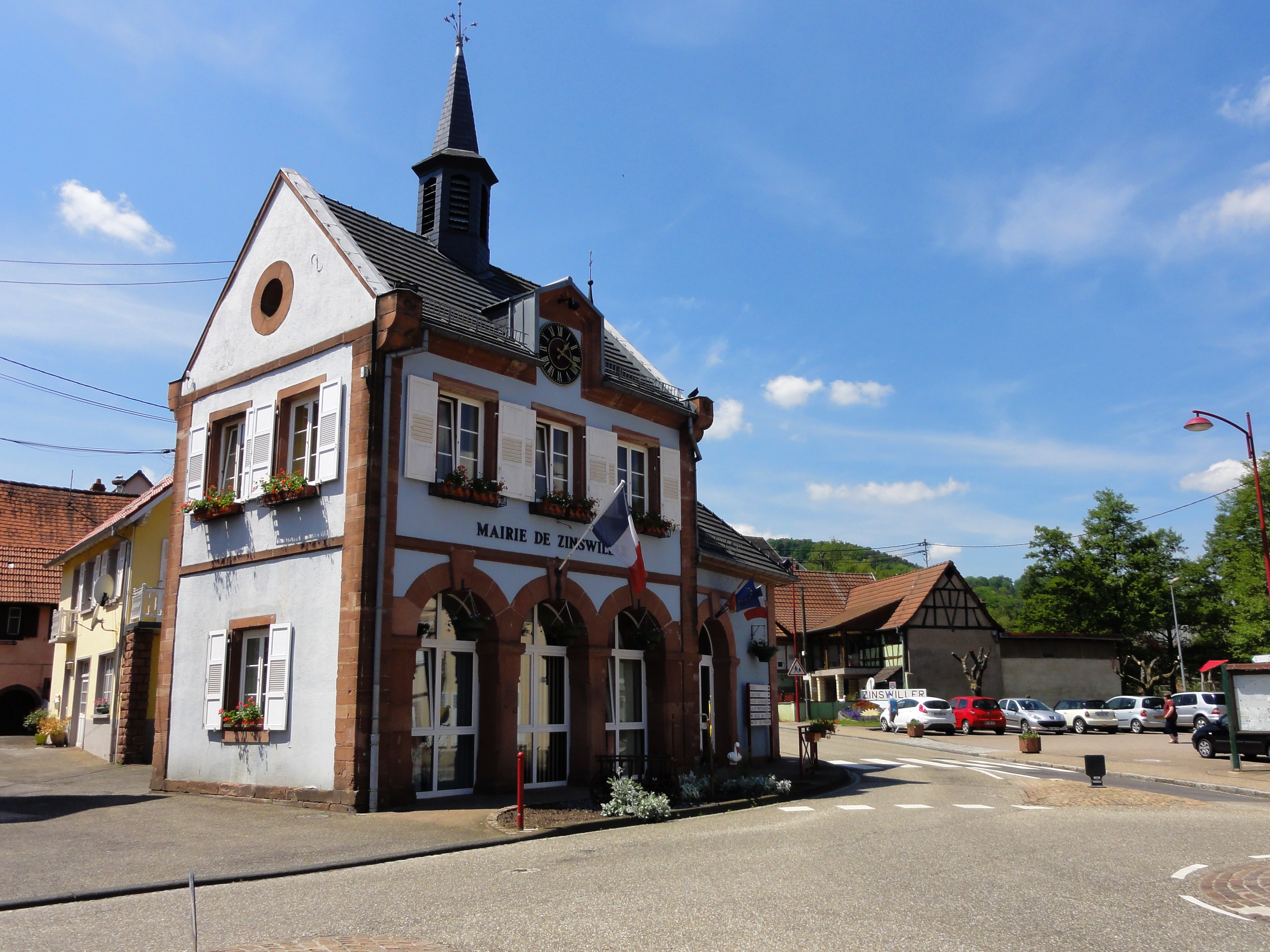
- The town hall in Zinswiller

- Coat of arms
- Location of Zinswiller
- Location within France Location within Grand Est
- Coordinates: 48°55′14″N 7°35′30″E
- Country: France
- Region: Grand Est
- Department: Bas-Rhin
- Arrondissement: Haguenau-Wissembourg
- Canton: Reichshoffen
- Intercommunality: Pays de Niederbronn-les-Bains

Government
  - Mayor (2020–2026): Christophe Wernert
- Area^{1}: 7.14 km^{2} (2.76 sq mi)
- Elevation: 260 m (850 ft)
- Highest elevation: 405 m (1,329 ft)
- Lowest elevation: 176 m (577 ft)
- Population (2023): 712
  - Density: 99.7/km^{2} (258/sq mi)
- Demonym(s): Zinswillerois, Zinswilleroises
- Time zone: UTC+01:00 (CET)
  - Summer (DST): UTC+02:00 (CEST)
- INSEE/Postal code: 67558 /67110
- ^{1} French Land Register data, which excludes lakes, ponds, glaciers > 1 km^{2} (0.386 sq mi or 247 acres) and river estuaries.

Zinswiller (German: Zinsweiler) is a commune in the Bas-Rhin department in Grand Est in north-eastern France. Zinswiller is 40 km from Strasbourg, the department capital, and 384 km from Paris.

== Population ==
Historical population

Year	Pop.	±% p.a.
1793	609	—
1800	507	−2.58%
1806	767	+7.14%
1821	878	+0.91%
1831	966	+0.96%
1836	918	−1.01%
1841	886	−0.71%
1846	935	+1.08%
1851	992	+1.19%
1856	905	−1.82%
1861	938	+0.72%
1866	942	+0.09%
1871	933	−0.19%
1875	891	−1.14%
1880	970	+1.71%
1885	961	−0.19%
1890	997	+0.74%

Year	Pop.	±% p.a.
1895	1,019	+0.44%
1900	1,034	+0.29%
1905	1,045	+0.21%
1910	1,050	+0.10%
1921	940	−1.00%
1926	920	−0.43%
1931	871	−1.09%
1936	866	−0.12%
1946	715	−1.90%
1954	755	+0.68%
1962	820	+1.04%
1968	927	+2.07%
1999	754	−0.66%
2007	820	+1.05%
2012	788	−0.79%
2017	769	−0.49%
2023	712	−1.28%

Source: EHESS and INSEE

== See also ==
- Communes of the Bas-Rhin department
