= Rothbach =

- Commune
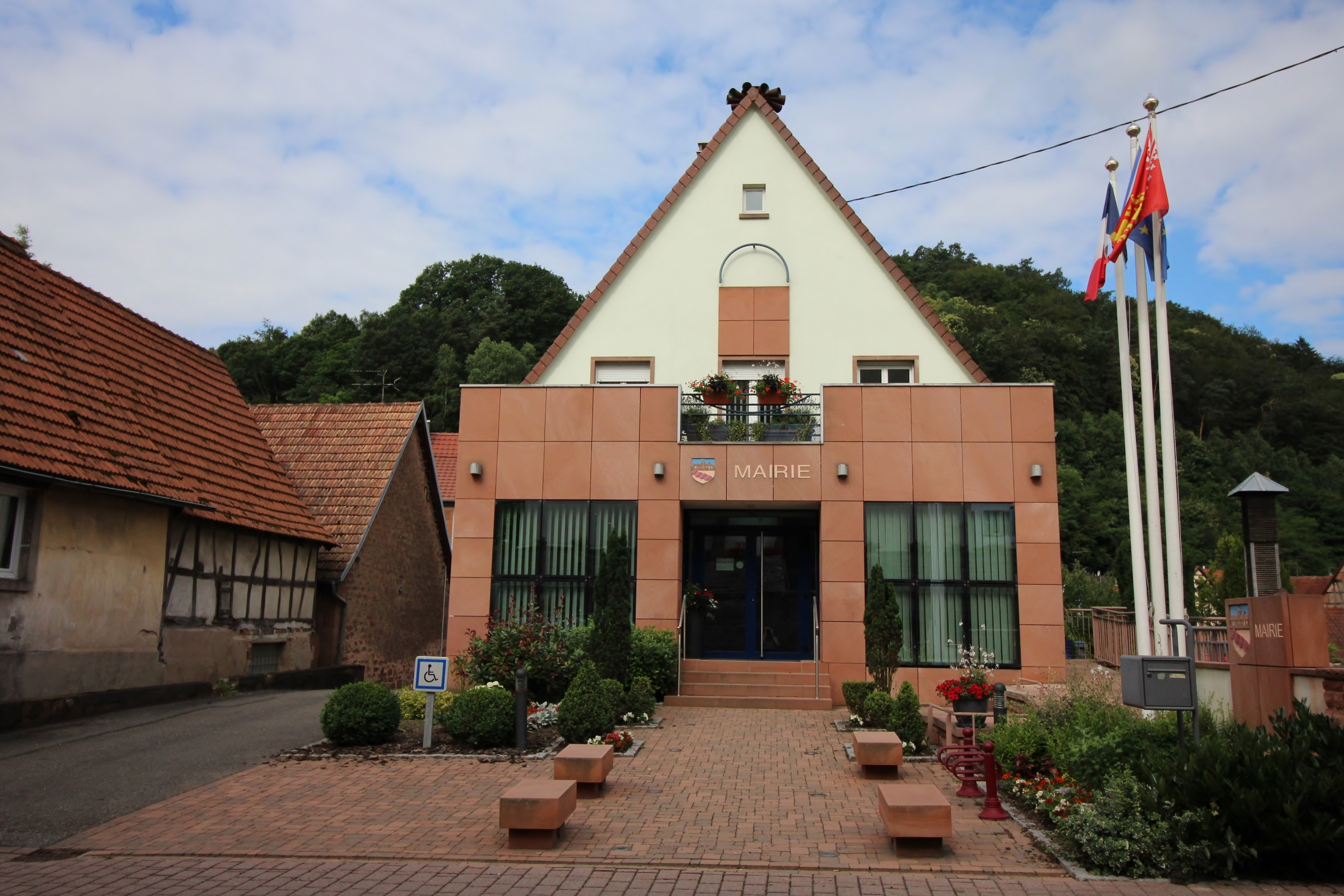
- The town hall in Rothbach

- Coat of arms
- Location of Rothbach
- Location within France Location within Grand Est
- Coordinates: 48°54′27″N 7°31′46″E
- Country: France
- Region: Grand Est
- Department: Bas-Rhin
- Arrondissement: Haguenau-Wissembourg
- Canton: Reichshoffen

Government
  - Mayor (2020–2026): Pascal Klein
- Area^{1}: 7.99 km^{2} (3.08 sq mi)
- Highest elevation: 375 m (1,230 ft)
- Lowest elevation: 185 m (607 ft)
- Population (2023): 466
  - Density: 58.3/km^{2} (151/sq mi)
- Time zone: UTC+01:00 (CET)
  - Summer (DST): UTC+02:00 (CEST)
- INSEE/Postal code: 67415 /67340
- ^{1} French Land Register data, which excludes lakes, ponds, glaciers > 1 km^{2} (0.386 sq mi or 247 acres) and river estuaries.

Rothbach is a commune in the Bas-Rhin department in Grand Est in north-eastern France.

== See also ==
- Communes of the Bas-Rhin department
