= Grentzingen =

Part of Illtal in Grand Est, France

- Part of Illtal
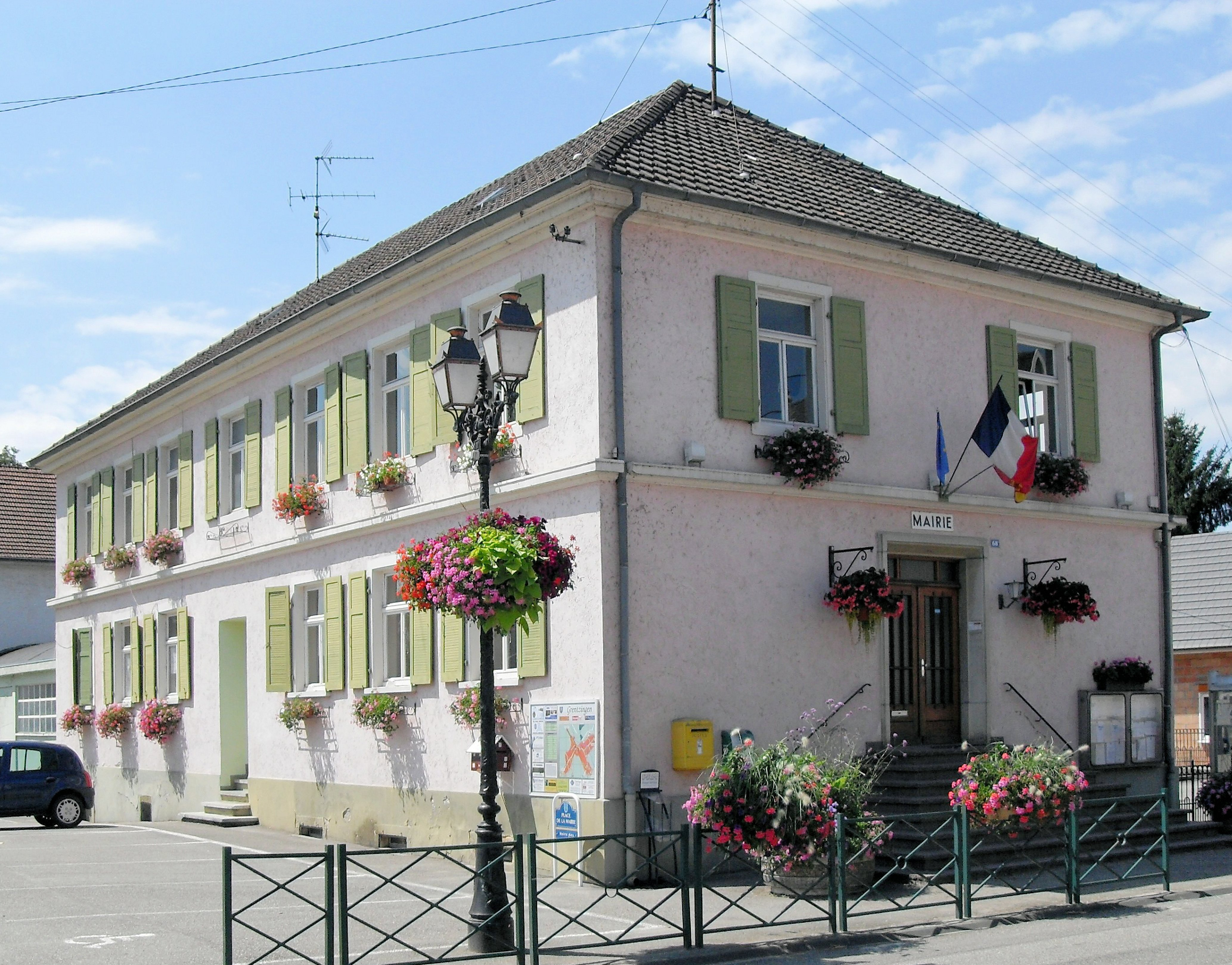
- Town hall

- Coat of arms
- Location of Grentzingen
- Location within France Location within Grand Est
- Coordinates: 47°33′58″N 7°17′58″E
- Country: France
- Region: Grand Est
- Department: Haut-Rhin
- Arrondissement: Altkirch
- Canton: Altkirch
- Commune: Illtal
- Area^{1}: 5.18 km^{2} (2.00 sq mi)
- Elevation: 339 m (1,112 ft)
- Highest elevation: 426 m (1,398 ft)
- Lowest elevation: 334 m (1,096 ft)
- Population (2019): 550
  - Density: 110/km^{2} (270/sq mi)
- Time zone: UTC+01:00 (CET)
  - Summer (DST): UTC+02:00 (CEST)
- Postal code: 68960
- ^{1} French Land Register data, which excludes lakes, ponds, glaciers > 1 km^{2} (0.386 sq mi or 247 acres) and river estuaries.

Grentzingen (German: Grenzingen, Alsatian: Granzìnge) is a former commune in the Haut-Rhin department in north-eastern France. On 1 January 2016, it was merged into the new commune Illtal.

== See also ==
- Communes of the Haut-Rhin département
