= Preuschdorf =

- Commune
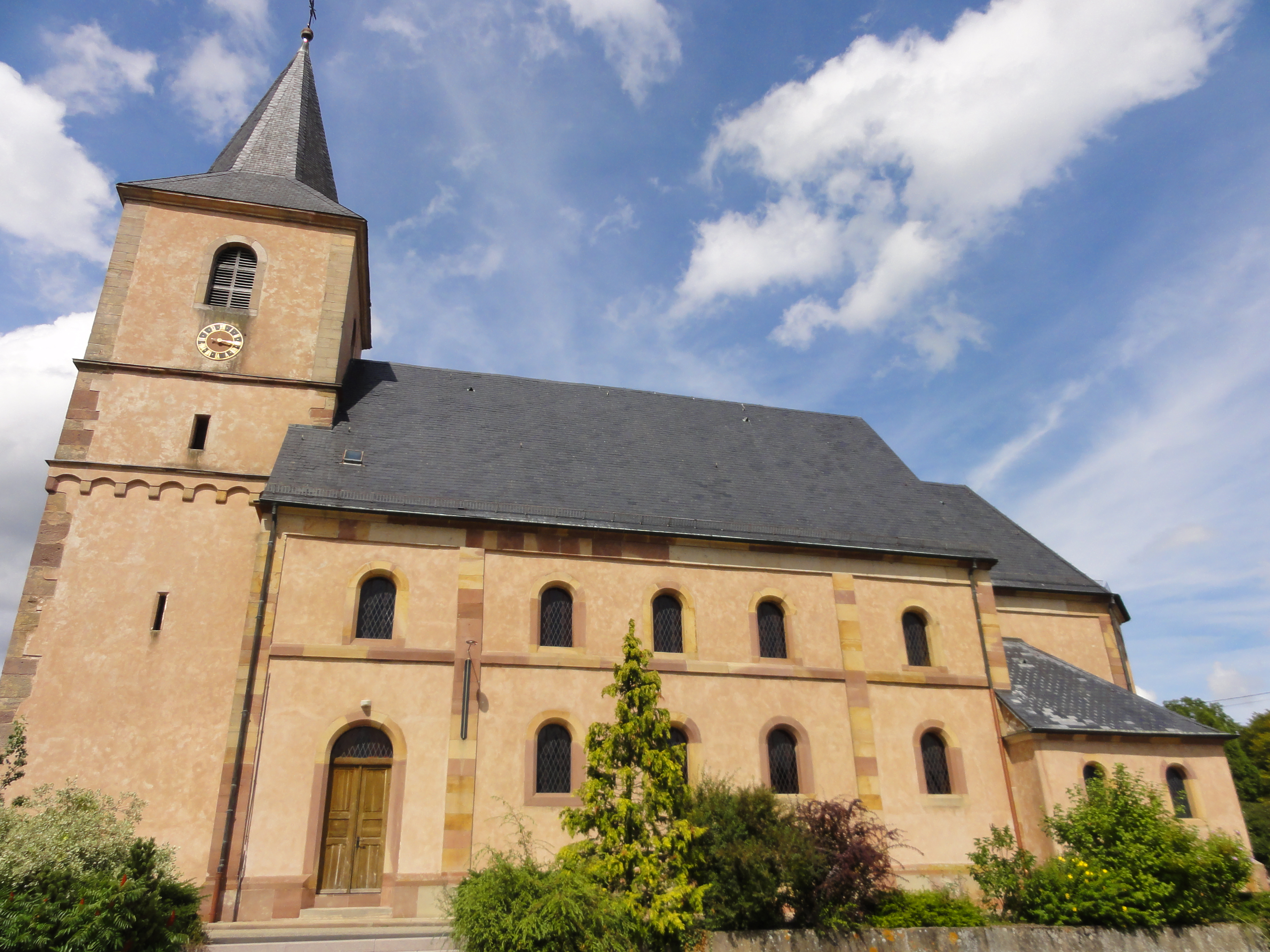
- The church in Preuschdorf

- Coat of arms
- Location of Preuschdorf
- Location within France Location within Grand Est
- Coordinates: 48°56′46″N 7°47′56″E
- Country: France
- Region: Grand Est
- Department: Bas-Rhin
- Arrondissement: Haguenau-Wissembourg
- Canton: Reichshoffen

Government
  - Mayor (2020–2026): Dominique Pfeiffer-Rinie
- Area^{1}: 7.57 km^{2} (2.92 sq mi)
- Highest elevation: 446 m (1,463 ft)
- Lowest elevation: 157 m (515 ft)
- Population (2023): 886
  - Density: 117/km^{2} (303/sq mi)
- Time zone: UTC+01:00 (CET)
  - Summer (DST): UTC+02:00 (CEST)
- INSEE/Postal code: 67379 /67250
- ^{1} French Land Register data, which excludes lakes, ponds, glaciers > 1 km^{2} (0.386 sq mi or 247 acres) and river estuaries.

Preuschdorf is a commune in the Bas-Rhin department in Grand Est in north-eastern France.

== See also ==
- Communes of the Bas-Rhin department
