= Wingen, Bas-Rhin =

Wingen
- Commune
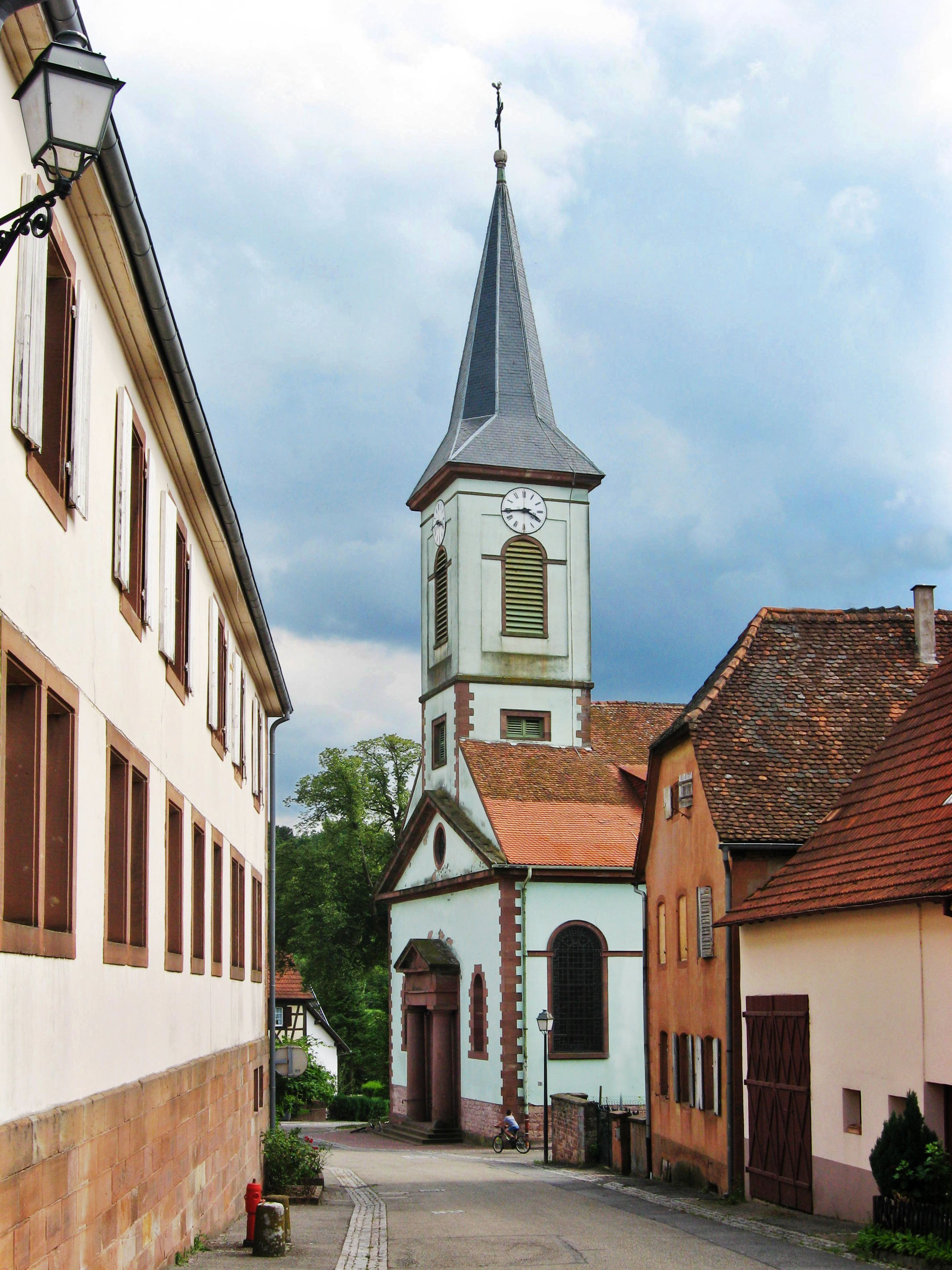
- The church in Wingen

- Coat of arms
- Location of Wingen
- Location within France Location within Grand Est
- Coordinates: 49°01′37″N 7°48′56″E
- Country: France
- Region: Grand Est
- Department: Bas-Rhin
- Arrondissement: Haguenau-Wissembourg
- Canton: Reichshoffen
- Intercommunality: Sauer-Pechelbronn

Government
  - Mayor (2020–2026): André Schmitt
- Area^{1}: 16.79 km^{2} (6.48 sq mi)
- Highest elevation: 553 m (1,814 ft)
- Lowest elevation: 220 m (720 ft)
- Population (2023): 445
  - Density: 26.5/km^{2} (68.6/sq mi)
- Time zone: UTC+01:00 (CET)
  - Summer (DST): UTC+02:00 (CEST)
- INSEE/Postal code: 67537 /67510
- ^{1} French Land Register data, which excludes lakes, ponds, glaciers > 1 km^{2} (0.386 sq mi or 247 acres) and river estuaries.

Wingen (French pronunciation: [viŋ(g)ən], Alsacian : Wìnge) is a commune in the Bas-Rhin department in Grand Est in north-eastern France.

== Population ==
Historical population
Year	Pop.	±% p.a.
1968	496	—
1975	485	−0.32%
1982	451	−1.03%
1990	456	+0.14%
1999	470	+0.34%
2007	455	−0.40%
2012	451	−0.18%
2017	453	+0.09%
2023	445	−0.30%
Source: INSEE

== See also ==
- Communes of the Bas-Rhin department
