= Offwiller =

- Commune
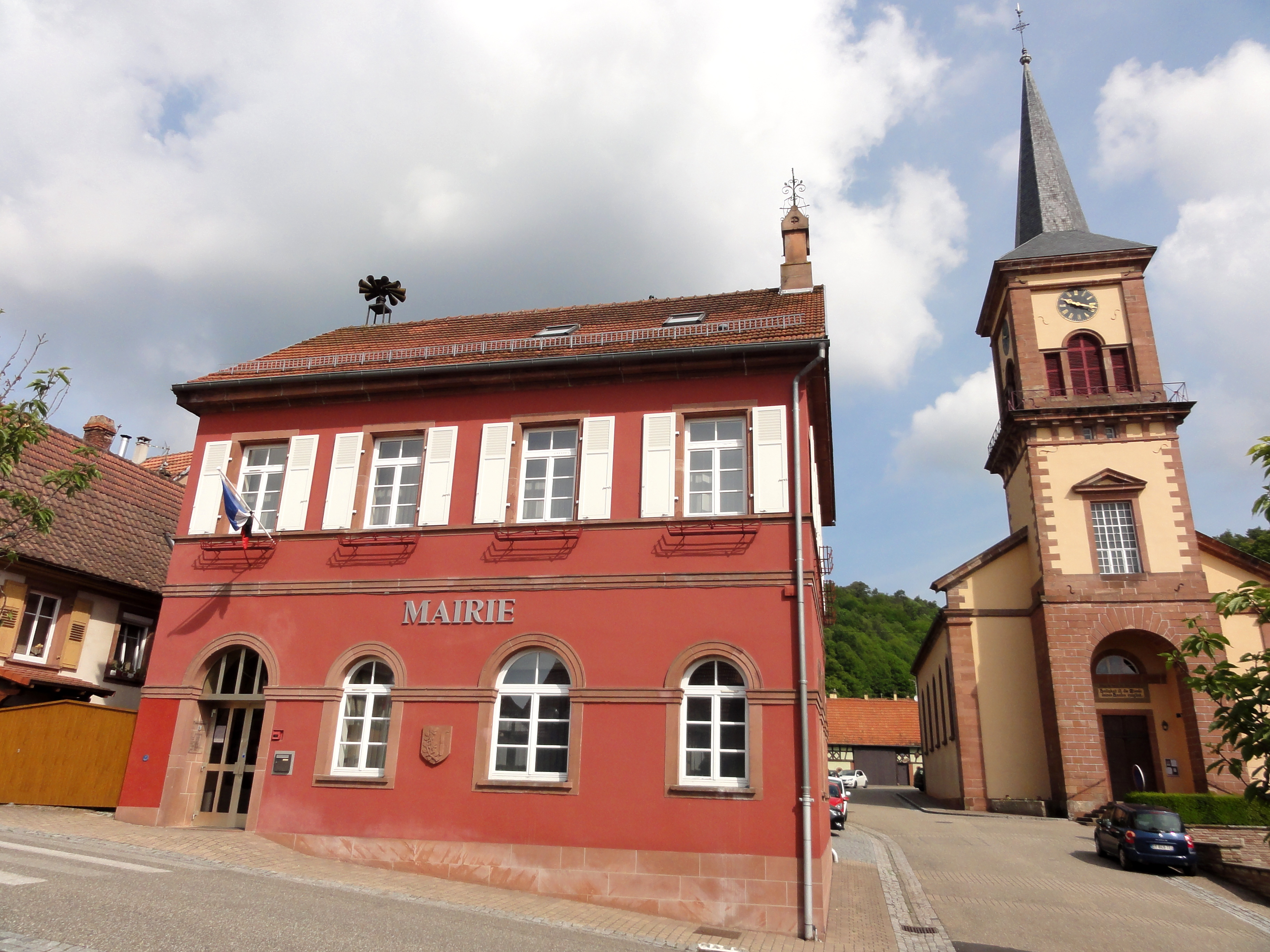
- The town hall in Offwiller

- Coat of arms
- Location of Offwiller
- Location within France Location within Grand Est
- Coordinates: 48°54′39″N 7°32′38″E
- Country: France
- Region: Grand Est
- Department: Bas-Rhin
- Arrondissement: Haguenau-Wissembourg
- Canton: Reichshoffen

Government
  - Mayor (2020–2026): Patrice Hilt
- Area^{1}: 15.92 km^{2} (6.15 sq mi)
- Highest elevation: 421 m (1,381 ft)
- Lowest elevation: 182 m (597 ft)
- Population (2023): 807
  - Density: 50.7/km^{2} (131/sq mi)
- Time zone: UTC+01:00 (CET)
  - Summer (DST): UTC+02:00 (CEST)
- INSEE/Postal code: 67358 /67340
- ^{1} French Land Register data, which excludes lakes, ponds, glaciers > 1 km^{2} (0.386 sq mi or 247 acres) and river estuaries.

Offwiller (German: Offweiler) is a commune in the Bas-Rhin department in Grand Est in north-eastern France.

== See also ==
- Communes of the Bas-Rhin department
