= Illtal =

Commune in Grand Est, France

- Commune
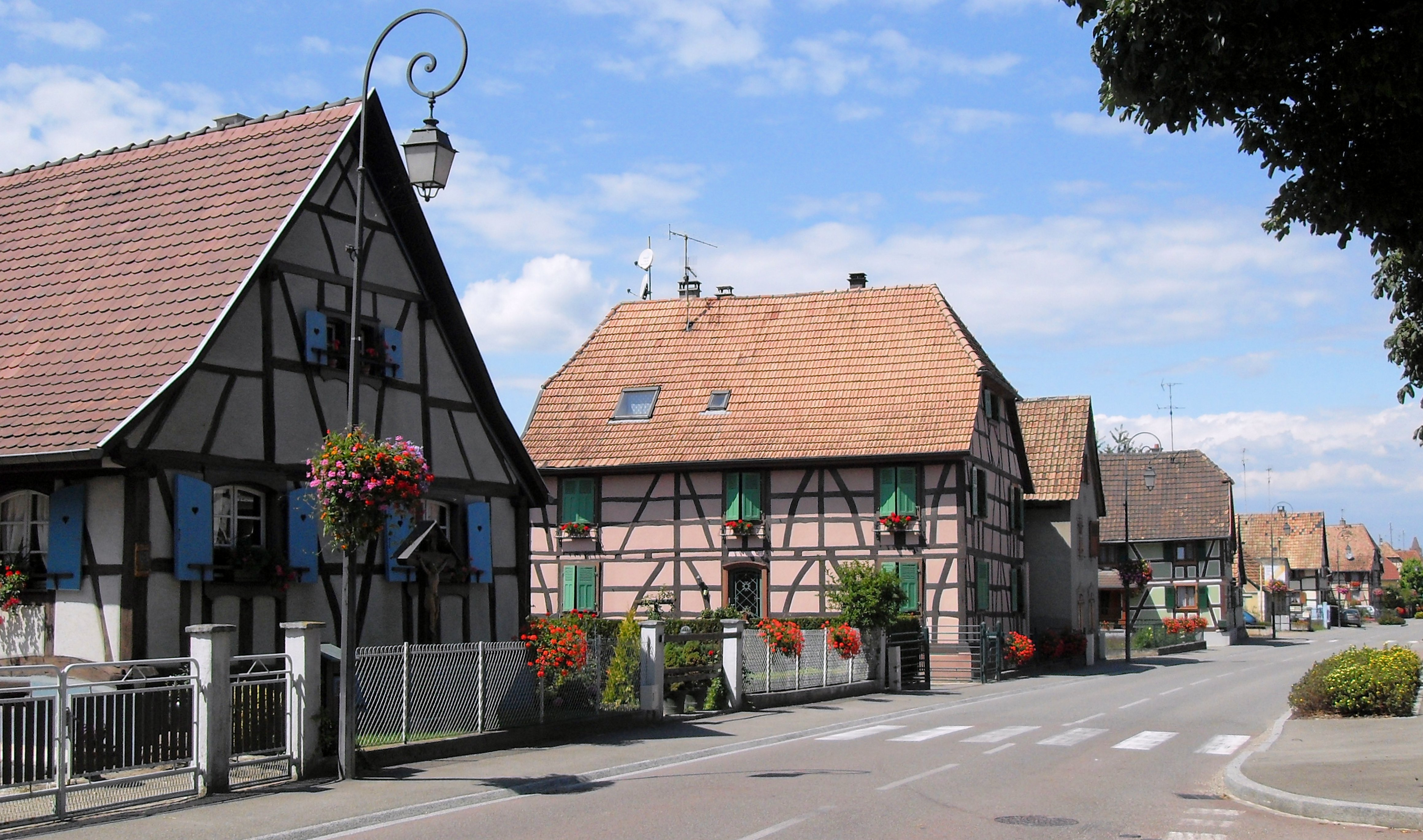
- The main road in Oberdorf
- Location of Illtal
- Location within France Location within Grand Est
- Coordinates: 47°33′32″N 7°18′22″E
- Country: France
- Region: Grand Est
- Department: Haut-Rhin
- Arrondissement: Altkirch
- Canton: Altkirch

Government
  - Mayor (2020–2026): Christian Lerdung
- Area^{1}: 11.96 km^{2} (4.62 sq mi)
- Population (2023): 1,203
  - Density: 100.6/km^{2} (260.5/sq mi)
- Time zone: UTC+01:00 (CET)
  - Summer (DST): UTC+02:00 (CEST)
- INSEE/Postal code: 68240 /68960
- ^{1} French Land Register data, which excludes lakes, ponds, glaciers > 1 km^{2} (0.386 sq mi or 247 acres) and river estuaries.

Illtal is a commune in the Haut-Rhin department of northeastern France. The municipality was established on 1 January 2016 and consists of the former communes of Oberdorf, Grentzingen and Henflingen. It takes its name from the valley of the river Ill.

== See also ==
- Communes of the Haut-Rhin department
