= Mietesheim =

Mietesheim Mietsem
- Commune
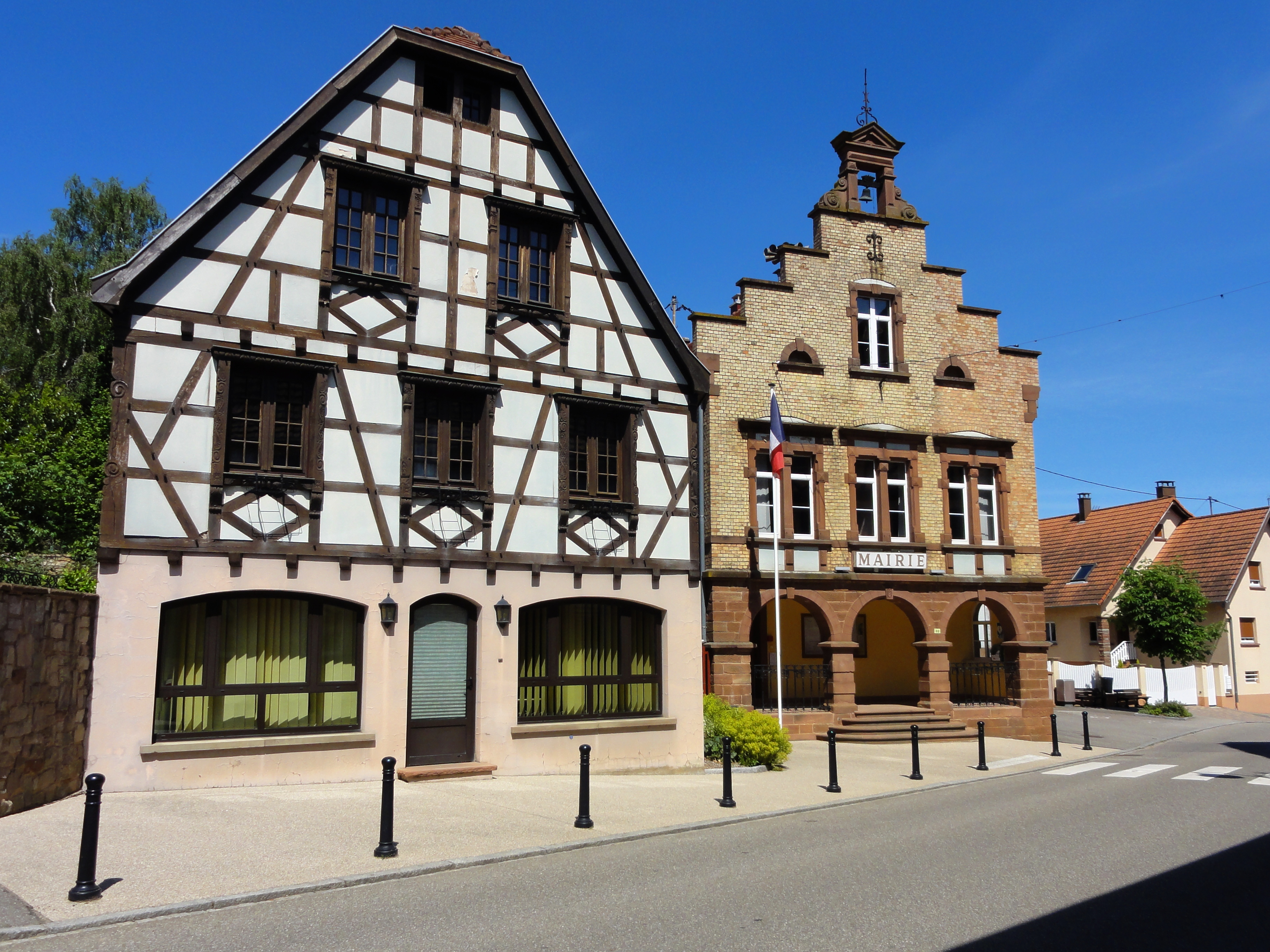
- The town hall in Mietesheim

- Coat of arms
- Location of Mietesheim
- Location within France Location within Grand Est
- Coordinates: 48°52′44″N 7°38′32″E
- Country: France
- Region: Grand Est
- Department: Bas-Rhin
- Arrondissement: Haguenau-Wissembourg
- Canton: Reichshoffen

Government
  - Mayor (2020–2026): Jean-Marie Ott
- Area^{1}: 8.49 km^{2} (3.28 sq mi)
- Highest elevation: 260 m (850 ft)
- Lowest elevation: 159 m (522 ft)
- Population (2023): 661
  - Density: 77.9/km^{2} (202/sq mi)
- Time zone: UTC+01:00 (CET)
  - Summer (DST): UTC+02:00 (CEST)
- INSEE/Postal code: 67292 /67580
- ^{1} French Land Register data, which excludes lakes, ponds, glaciers > 1 km^{2} (0.386 sq mi or 247 acres) and river estuaries.

Mietesheim (French pronunciation: [mitəsaim]; Alsatian: Mietsem) is a commune in the Bas-Rhin department in Grand Est in north-eastern France.

== See also ==
- Communes of the Bas-Rhin department
