= Gundershoffen =

Gundershoffen Gunderschoffe
- Commune
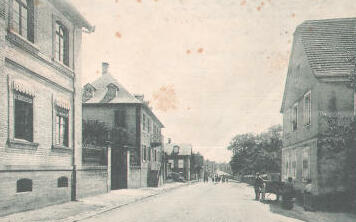
- Gundershoffen in or shortly before 1898

- Coat of arms
- Location of Gundershoffen
- Location within France Location within Grand Est
- Coordinates: 48°55′N 7°40′E
- Country: France
- Region: Grand Est
- Department: Bas-Rhin
- Arrondissement: Haguenau-Wissembourg
- Canton: Reichshoffen

Government
  - Mayor (2020–2026): Victor Vogt
- Area^{1}: 17.55 km^{2} (6.78 sq mi)
- Highest elevation: 261 m (856 ft)
- Lowest elevation: 163 m (535 ft)
- Population (2023): 3,834
  - Density: 218.5/km^{2} (565.8/sq mi)
- Time zone: UTC+01:00 (CET)
  - Summer (DST): UTC+02:00 (CEST)
- INSEE/Postal code: 67176 /67110
- ^{1} French Land Register data, which excludes lakes, ponds, glaciers > 1 km^{2} (0.386 sq mi or 247 acres) and river estuaries.

Gundershoffen (German: Gundershofen) is a commune in the Bas-Rhin department in Grand Est in north-eastern France.

== History ==
Archaeological finds such as coins, pottery, and statues from the third century testify to the presence of a settlement here in the Gallo-Roman period.

The earliest surviving written record of the place dates from 1232, where the name used for the settlement is Guntershoven, a name which endured at least until the seventeenth century.

The village was at one stage owned by the Dukes of Lorraine. Like many villages in Alsace, Gundershoffen was ravaged by the Thirty Years War with savage depopulation resulting: it was subsequently repopulated by families from Switzerland.

In 1940, the Germans recovered Alsace and the little town suffered badly from the fighting of the Second World War. Liberation appeared in the form of the US Army on December 3, 1944, but the area was recaptured by German troops. Only in March 1945 were the German fighters finally expelled.

== Population ==
Historical population
| Year | Pop. | ±% p.a. |
|---|---|---|
| 1968 | 2,502 | — |
| 1975 | 2,738 | +1.30% |
| 1982 | 3,261 | +2.53% |
| 1990 | 3,377 | +0.44% |
| 1999 | 3,490 | +0.37% |
| 2007 | 3,458 | −0.12% |
| 2012 | 3,586 | +0.73% |
| 2017 | 3,679 | +0.51% |
| 2023 | 3,834 | +0.69% |
Source: INSEE

== Landmarks ==
Gundershoffen possesses an eighteenth-century Protestant church and a modern Catholic one.

The Jewish cemetery dates from the late eighteenth or early nineteenth century, and continues to be used by Gundershoffen and by the neighbouring commune of Reichshoffen.

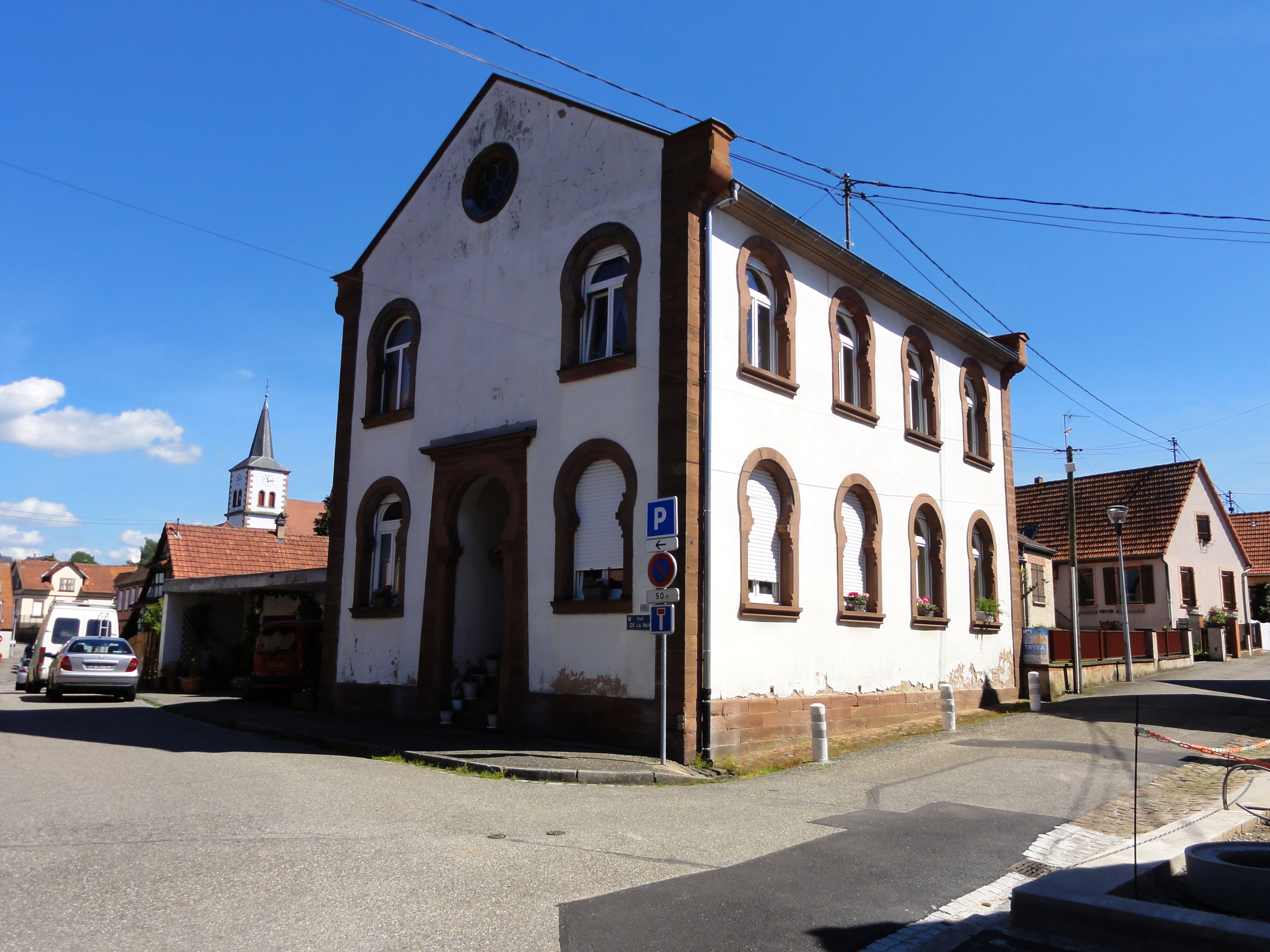

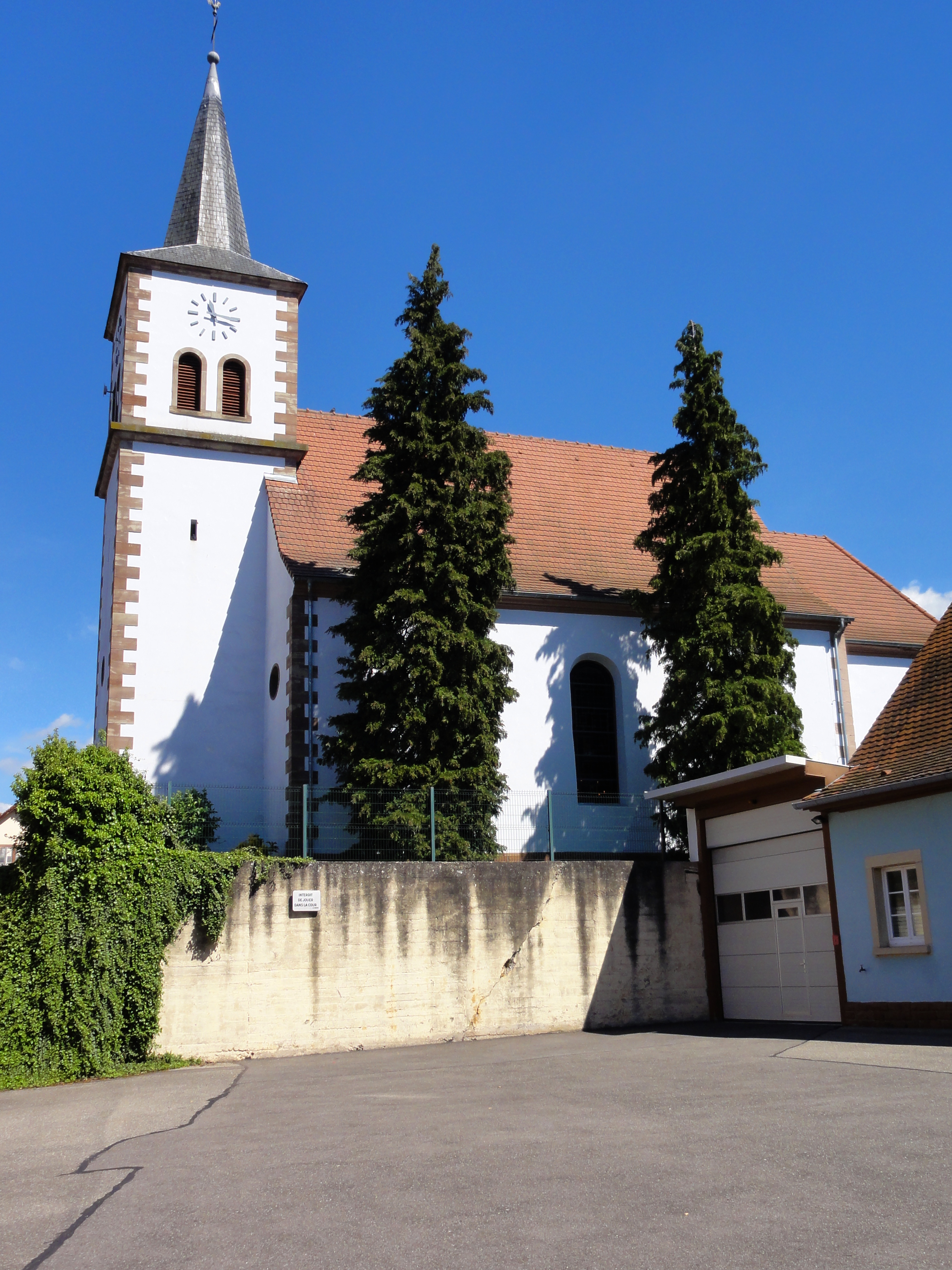

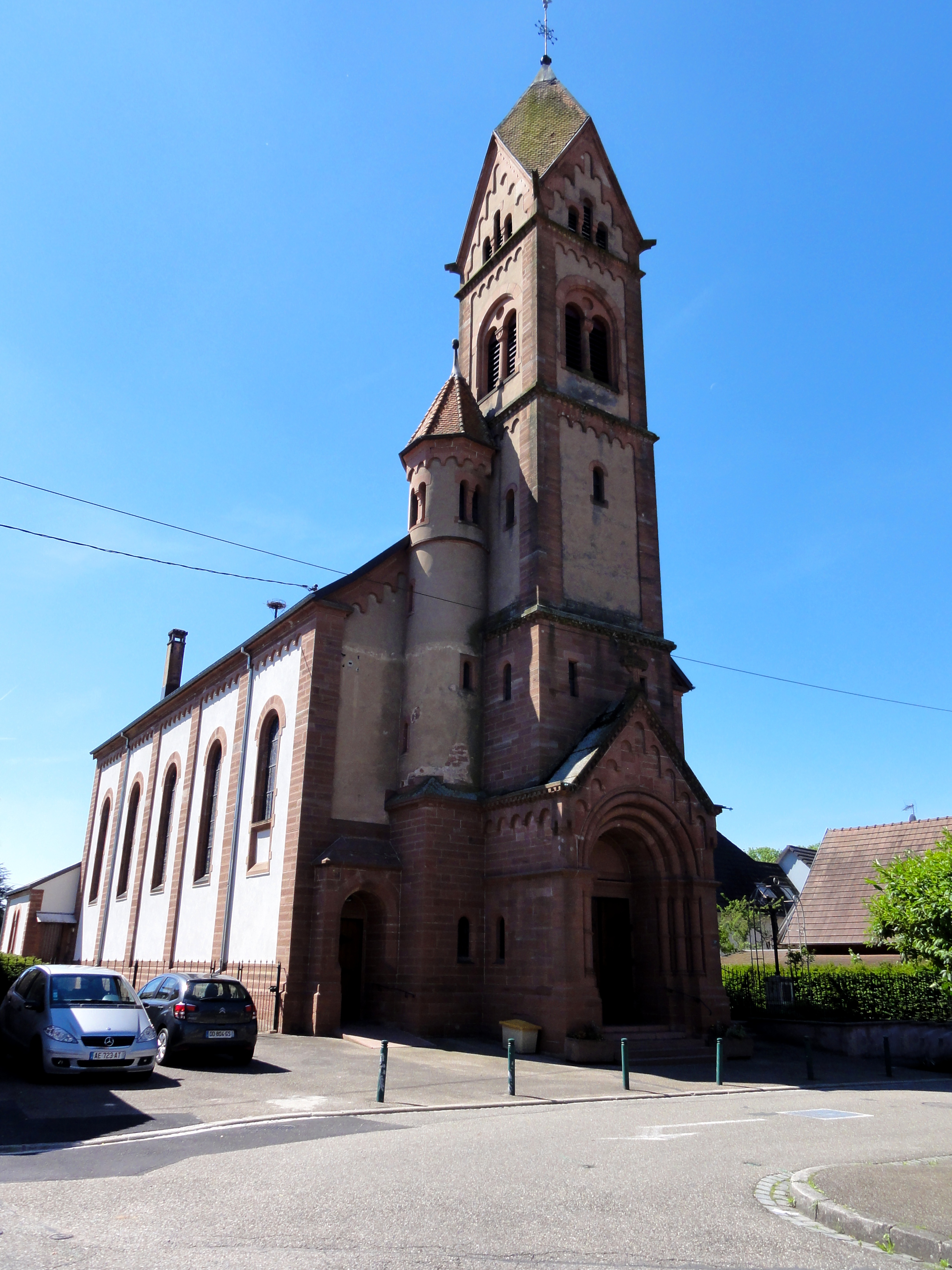

== See also ==
- Communes of the Bas-Rhin department
