= Canton of Reichshoffen =

Coordinates: 48.93°N 7.66°E

- Canton
- Situation of the canton of Reichshoffen in the department of Bas-Rhin
- Country: France
- Region: Grand Est
- Department: Bas-Rhin
- No. of communes: {{{nbcomm}}}
- Population (2023): 48,643
- INSEE code: 6713

The canton of Reichshoffen is an administrative division of the Bas-Rhin department, northeastern France. It was created at the French canton reorganisation which came into effect in March 2015. Its seat is in Reichshoffen.

It consists of the following communes:

1. Biblisheim
2. Bitschhoffen
3. Dambach
4. Dieffenbach-lès-Wœrth
5. Durrenbach
6. Engwiller
7. Eschbach
8. Forstheim
9. Frœschwiller
10. Gœrsdorf
11. Gumbrechtshoffen
12. Gundershoffen
13. Gunstett
14. Hegeney
15. Kindwiller
16. Kutzenhausen
17. Lampertsloch
18. Langensoultzbach
19. Laubach
20. Lembach
21. Lobsann
22. Merkwiller-Pechelbronn
23. Mertzwiller
24. Mietesheim
25. Morsbronn-les-Bains
26. Niederbronn-les-Bains
27. Niedermodern
28. Niedersteinbach
29. Oberbronn
30. Oberdorf-Spachbach
31. Obersteinbach
32. Offwiller
33. Preuschdorf
34. Reichshoffen
35. Rothbach
36. Uhrwiller
37. Uttenhoffen
38. Val-de-Moder (partly)
39. Walbourg
40. Windstein
41. Wingen
42. Wœrth
43. Zinswiller
