= Henflingen =

Part of Illtal in Grand Est, France

- Part of Illtal
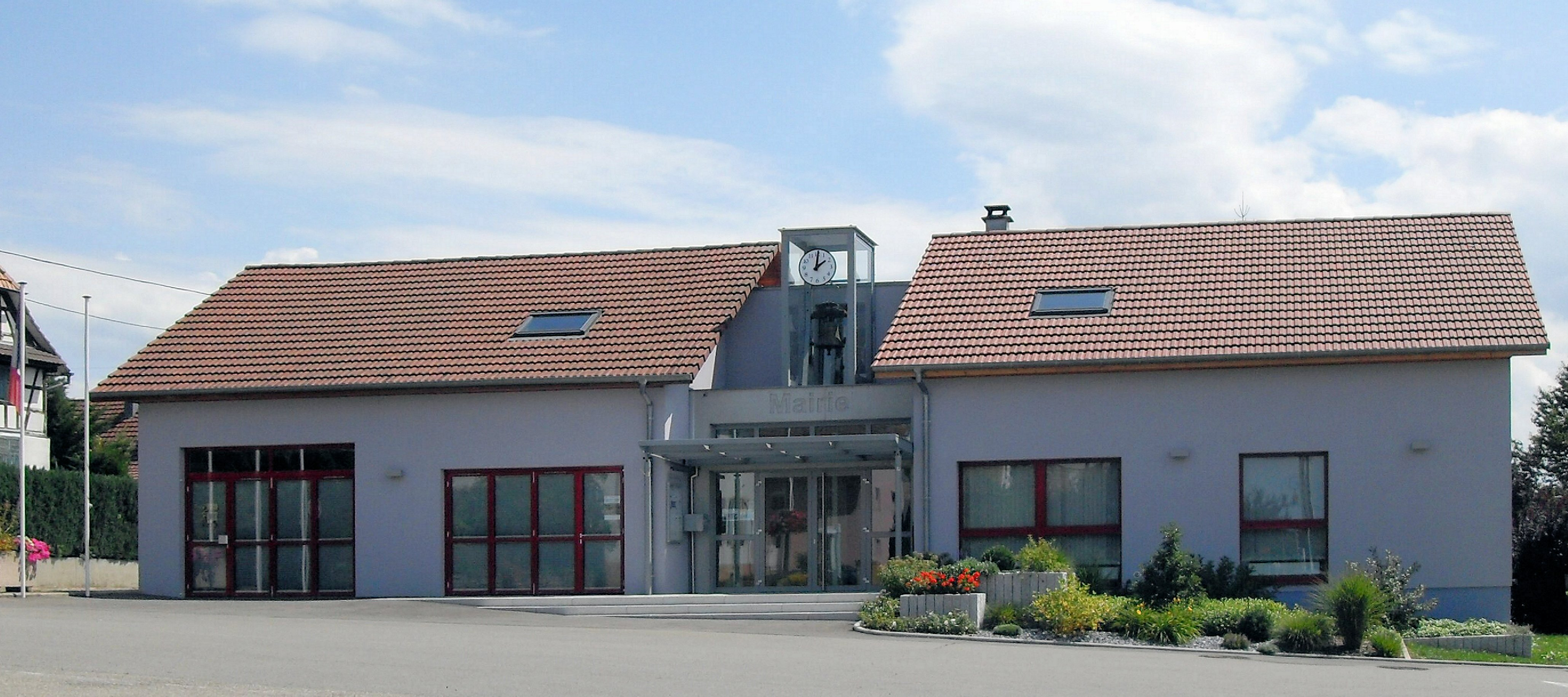
- Town hall

- Coat of arms
- Location of Henflingen
- Location within France Location within Grand Est
- Coordinates: 47°34′30″N 7°17′21″E
- Country: France
- Region: Grand Est
- Department: Haut-Rhin
- Arrondissement: Altkirch
- Canton: Altkirch
- Commune: Illtal
- Area^{1}: 2.65 km^{2} (1.02 sq mi)
- Elevation: 338 m (1,109 ft)
- Highest elevation: 419 m (1,375 ft)
- Lowest elevation: 329 m (1,079 ft)
- Population (2019): 199
  - Density: 75.1/km^{2} (194/sq mi)
- Time zone: UTC+01:00 (CET)
  - Summer (DST): UTC+02:00 (CEST)
- Postal code: 68960
- ^{1} French Land Register data, which excludes lakes, ponds, glaciers > 1 km^{2} (0.386 sq mi or 247 acres) and river estuaries.

Henflingen (Alsatian: Haiflìnge) is a former commune in the Haut-Rhin department in north-eastern France. On 1 January 2016, it was merged into the new commune Illtal.

== See also ==
- Communes of the Haut-Rhin département
