= Biblisheim =

Biblisheim Bíwelse
- Commune
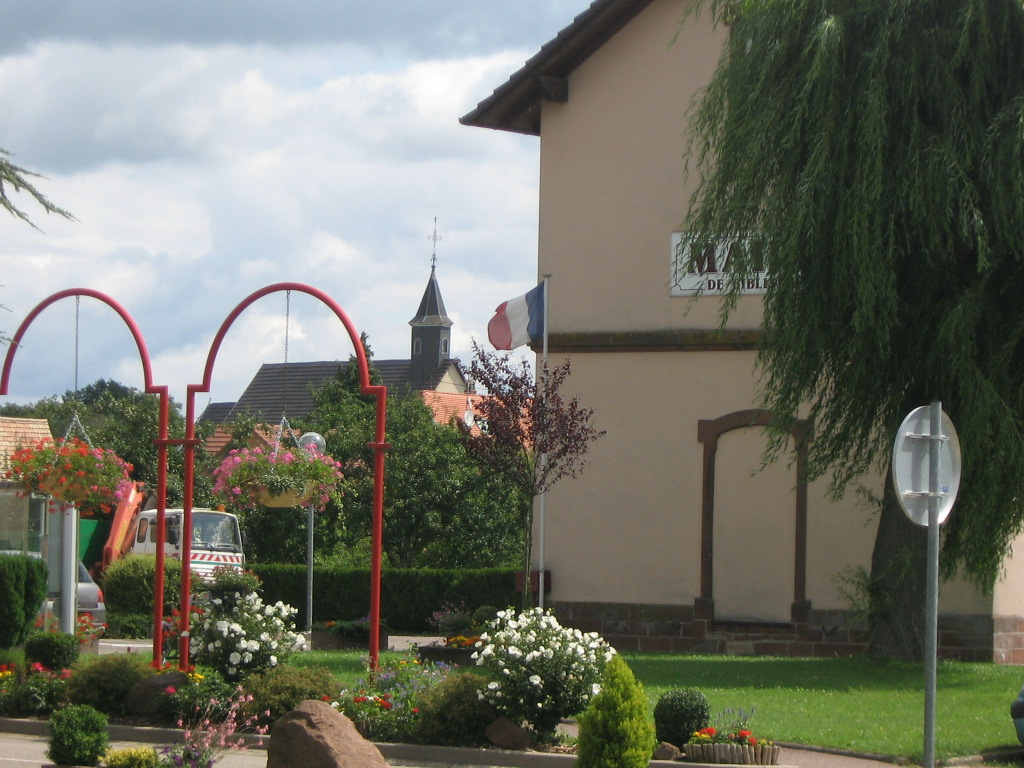
- The church and town hall in Biblisheim

- Coat of arms
- Location of Biblisheim
- Location within France Location within Grand Est
- Coordinates: 48°53′59″N 7°47′45″E
- Country: France
- Region: Grand Est
- Department: Bas-Rhin
- Arrondissement: Haguenau-Wissembourg
- Canton: Reichshoffen

Government
  - Mayor (2020–2026): Mireille Cabirol de Saint Georges
- Area^{1}: 2.24 km^{2} (0.86 sq mi)
- Highest elevation: 159 m (522 ft)
- Lowest elevation: 152 m (499 ft)
- Population (2023): 349
  - Density: 156/km^{2} (404/sq mi)
- Time zone: UTC+01:00 (CET)
  - Summer (DST): UTC+02:00 (CEST)
- INSEE/Postal code: 67037 /67360
- ^{1} French Land Register data, which excludes lakes, ponds, glaciers > 1 km^{2} (0.386 sq mi or 247 acres) and river estuaries.

Biblisheim (French pronunciation: [biblisaim]; Alsatian: Bíwelse) is a commune in the Bas-Rhin department in Grand Est in northeastern France.

== Population ==
Historical population
Year	Pop.	±% p.a.
1968	242	—
1975	252	+0.58%
1982	244	−0.46%
1990	339	+4.20%
1999	372	+1.04%
2007	367	−0.17%
2012	336	−1.75%
2017	358	+1.28%
2023	349	−0.42%
Source: INSEE

== See also ==
- Communes of the Bas-Rhin department
