= Eschbach, Bas-Rhin =

Eschbach Eschbàch
- Commune
- Coat of arms
- Location of Eschbach
- Location within France Location within Grand Est
- Coordinates: 48°52′30″N 7°44′14″E
- Country: France
- Region: Grand Est
- Department: Bas-Rhin
- Arrondissement: Haguenau-Wissembourg
- Canton: Reichshoffen

Government
  - Mayor (2020–2026): Hervé Tritschberger
- Area^{1}: 3.97 km^{2} (1.53 sq mi)
- Highest elevation: 208 m (682 ft)
- Lowest elevation: 165 m (541 ft)
- Population (2023): 955
  - Density: 241/km^{2} (623/sq mi)
- Time zone: UTC+01:00 (CET)
  - Summer (DST): UTC+02:00 (CEST)
- INSEE/Postal code: 67132 /67360
- ^{1} French Land Register data, which excludes lakes, ponds, glaciers > 1 km^{2} (0.386 sq mi or 247 acres) and river estuaries.

Eschbach is a commune in the Bas-Rhin department in Grand Est in north-eastern France.

== See also ==
- Communes of the Bas-Rhin department
