= Battle of Wœrth (1793) =

Coordinates: 48.3833°N 7.63333°E

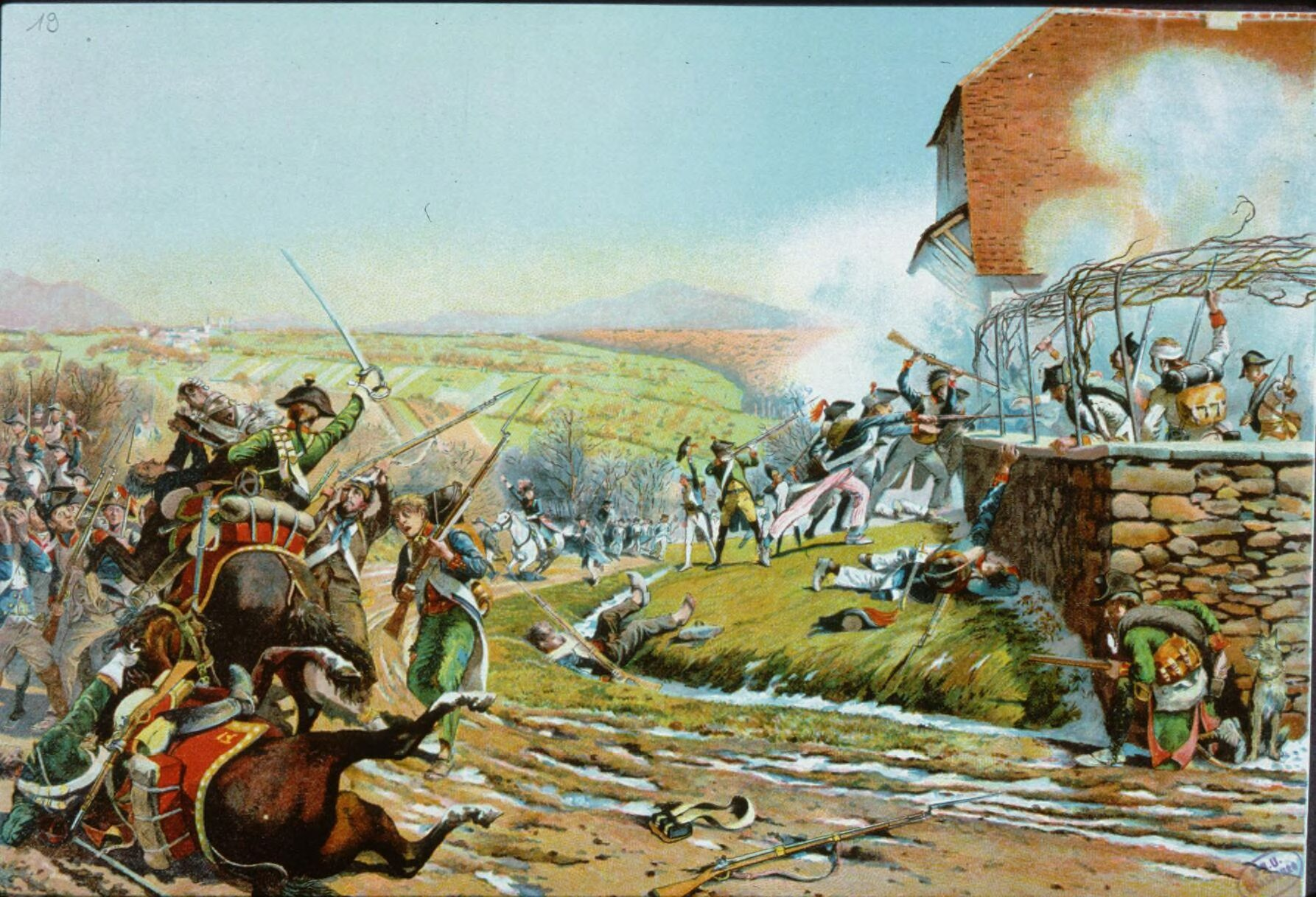

The Battle of Woerth was fought on December 23, 1793, and resulted the victory of the French under General Louis Hoche against the Prussians under General Friedrich Freiherr von Hotze. The Prussians' redoubts were taken at bayonet by the French soldiers.
