= Dieffenbach-lès-Wœrth =

Dieffenbach-lès-Wœrth Diefebàch
- Commune
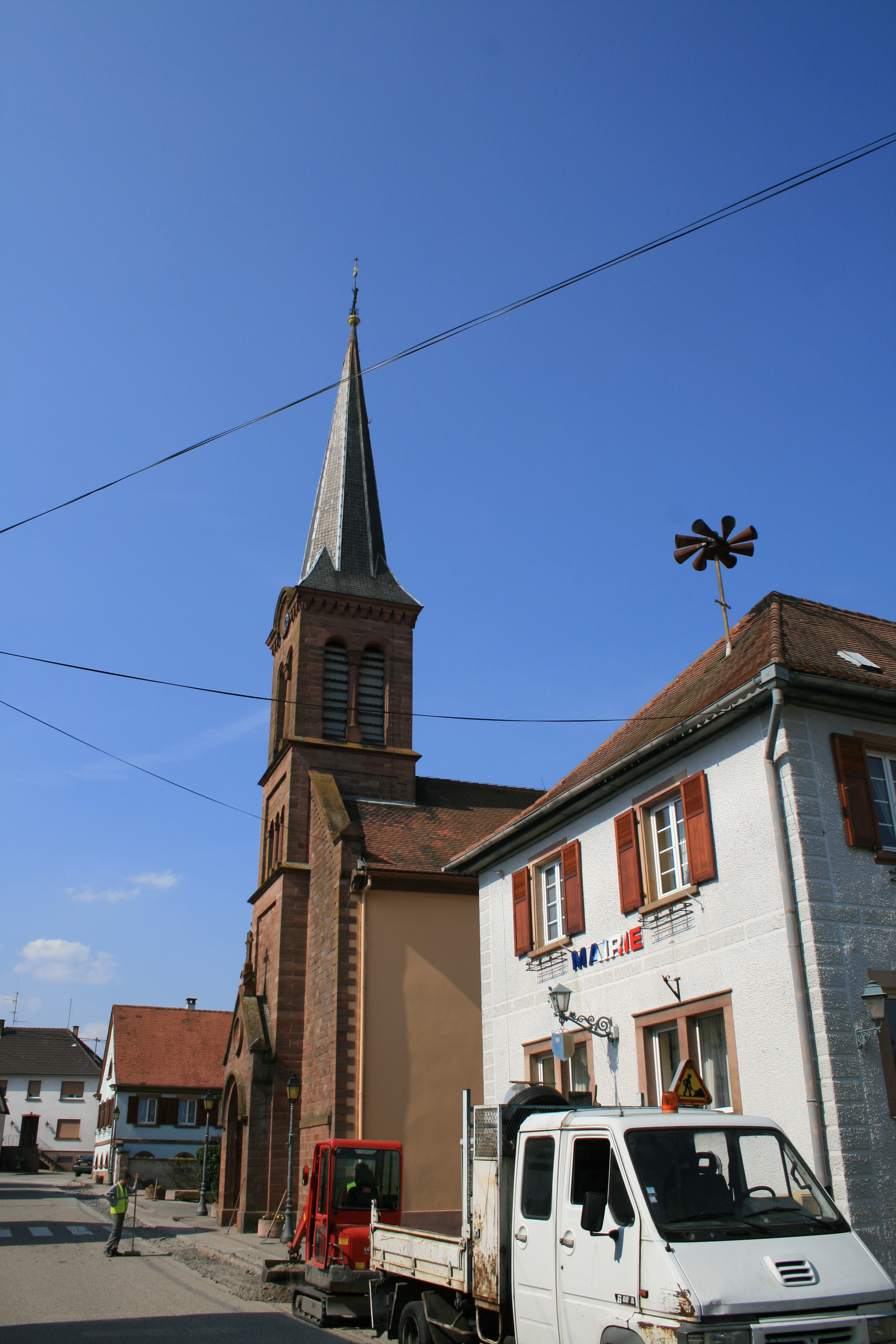
- The church and town hall in Dieffenbach-lès-Wœrth

- Coat of arms
- Location of Dieffenbach-lès-Wœrth
- Location within France Location within Grand Est
- Coordinates: 48°56′00″N 7°46′46″E
- Country: France
- Region: Grand Est
- Department: Bas-Rhin
- Arrondissement: Haguenau-Wissembourg
- Canton: Reichshoffen

Government
  - Mayor (2020–2026): Patrick Jean-Louis Wacker
- Area^{1}: 3.61 km^{2} (1.39 sq mi)
- Highest elevation: 242 m (794 ft)
- Lowest elevation: 162 m (531 ft)
- Population (2023): 322
  - Density: 89.2/km^{2} (231/sq mi)
- Time zone: UTC+01:00 (CET)
  - Summer (DST): UTC+02:00 (CEST)
- INSEE/Postal code: 67093 /67360
- ^{1} French Land Register data, which excludes lakes, ponds, glaciers > 1 km^{2} (0.386 sq mi or 247 acres) and river estuaries.

Dieffenbach-lès-Wœrth (French pronunciation: [difənbax lɛ vœʁt]; German: Diefenbach bei Wörth) is a commune in the Bas-Rhin department in Grand Est in north-eastern France.

== See also ==
- Communes of the Bas-Rhin department
