= Forstheim =

Forstheim Forschem
- Commune
- Coat of arms
- Location of Forstheim
- Location within France Location within Grand Est
- Coordinates: 48°53′52″N 7°42′54″E
- Country: France
- Region: Grand Est
- Department: Bas-Rhin
- Arrondissement: Haguenau-Wissembourg
- Canton: Reichshoffen

Government
  - Mayor (2020–2026): Guillaume Peter
- Area^{1}: 5.05 km^{2} (1.95 sq mi)
- Highest elevation: 246 m (807 ft)
- Lowest elevation: 174 m (571 ft)
- Population (2023): 599
  - Density: 119/km^{2} (307/sq mi)
- Time zone: UTC+01:00 (CET)
  - Summer (DST): UTC+02:00 (CEST)
- INSEE/Postal code: 67141 /67580
- ^{1} French Land Register data, which excludes lakes, ponds, glaciers > 1 km^{2} (0.386 sq mi or 247 acres) and river estuaries.

Forstheim is a commune in the Bas-Rhin department in Grand Est in north-eastern France.

To the south and southwest the village is flanked by a wood. Otherwise, Forstheim is surrounded by arable farmland.

Between 1962 and 2006 the registered population rose from 487 to 539.

== See also ==
- Communes of the Bas-Rhin department
