= Kuptsovo =

Kuptsovo Купцово
- Selo
- Location within Volgograd Oblast Location within Russia
- Coordinates: 50°19′N 45°00′E
- Country: Russia
- Region: Volgograd Oblast
- District: Kotovsky District
- Time zone: UTC+4:00

Kuptsovo (Russian: Купцово) is a rural locality (a selo) and the administrative center of Kuptsovskoye Rural Settlement, Kotovsky District, Volgograd Oblast, Russia. The population was 1,075 as of 2010. There are 6 streets.

== Geography ==
Kuptsovo is located in forest steppe, on Volga Upland, on the Mokraya Olkhovka River, 19 km east of Kotovo (the district's administrative centre) by road. Lapshinskaya is the nearest rural locality.

== History ==
Kuptsovo was first settled as a khutor sometime before 1828, by a Russian man named Kuptsov.

=== Oberdorf ===
In 1828, a German named Becker established his own khutor on the land, which was initially called "Becker's Chutor" as more Volga German colonists came to settle in the area. It was officially established as a Lutheran colony under the name "Oberdorf" in 1852. Its final recorded population in 1939 was 2,294; most of these colonists were likely forcibly removed from the area following the dissolution of the Volga German ASSR.
