= Laubach, Bas-Rhin =

Laubach Laubàch
- Commune
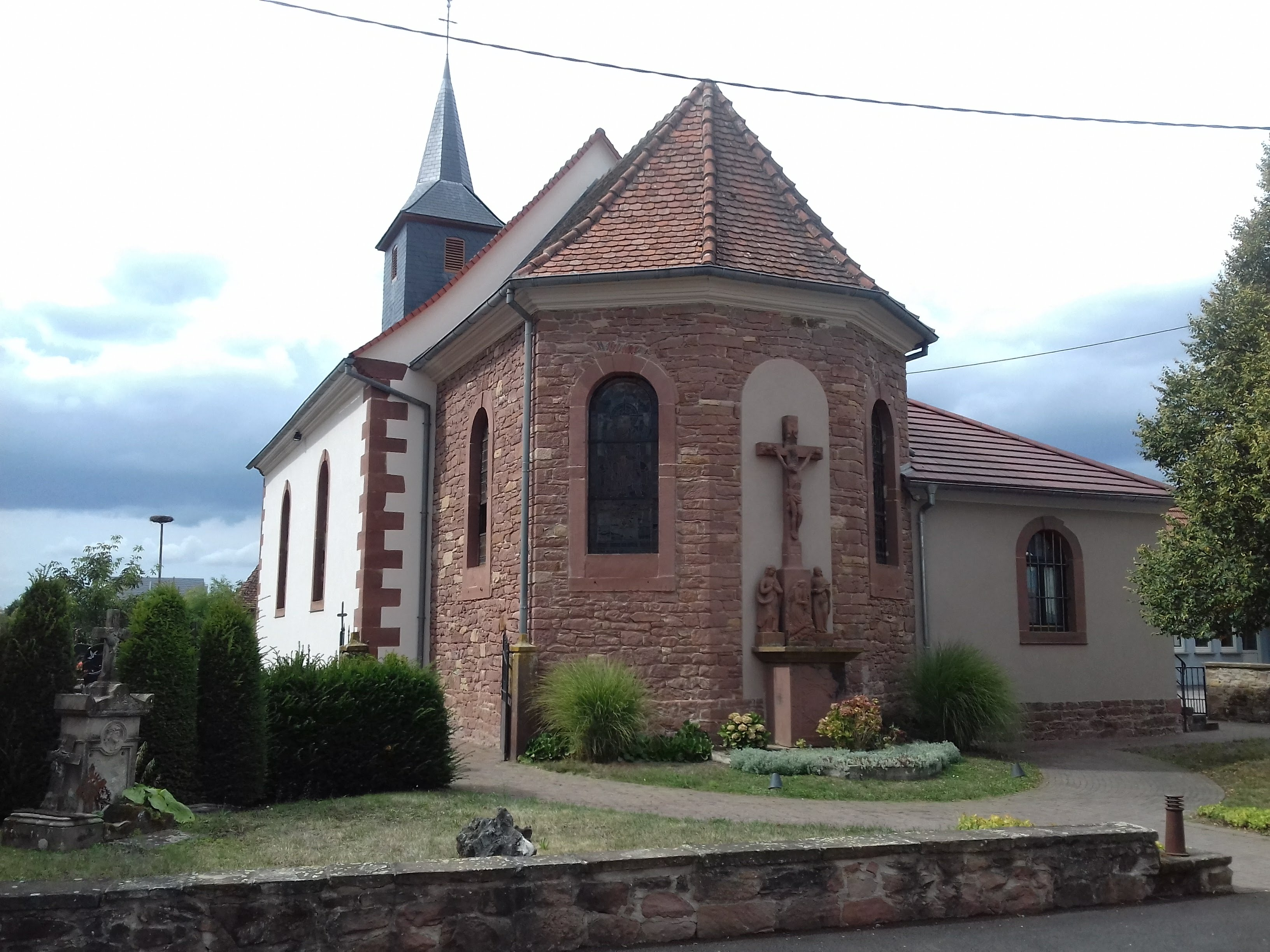
- Saint Joseph Church

- Coat of arms
- Location of Laubach
- Location within France Location within Grand Est
- Coordinates: 48°52′57″N 7°43′16″E
- Country: France
- Region: Grand Est
- Department: Bas-Rhin
- Arrondissement: Haguenau-Wissembourg
- Canton: Reichshoffen

Government
  - Mayor (2020–2026): Jean-Louis Klipfel
- Area^{1}: 1.69 km^{2} (0.65 sq mi)
- Highest elevation: 218 m (715 ft)
- Lowest elevation: 176 m (577 ft)
- Population (2023): 311
  - Density: 184/km^{2} (477/sq mi)
- Time zone: UTC+01:00 (CET)
  - Summer (DST): UTC+02:00 (CEST)
- INSEE/Postal code: 67260 /67580
- ^{1} French Land Register data, which excludes lakes, ponds, glaciers > 1 km^{2} (0.386 sq mi or 247 acres) and river estuaries.

Laubach is a commune in the Bas-Rhin department in Grand Est in north-eastern France. It lies 10 kilometres (6 miles) northwest of Haguenau.

== See also ==
- Communes of the Bas-Rhin department
