= Durrenbach =

Durrenbach Dìrrebàch
- Commune
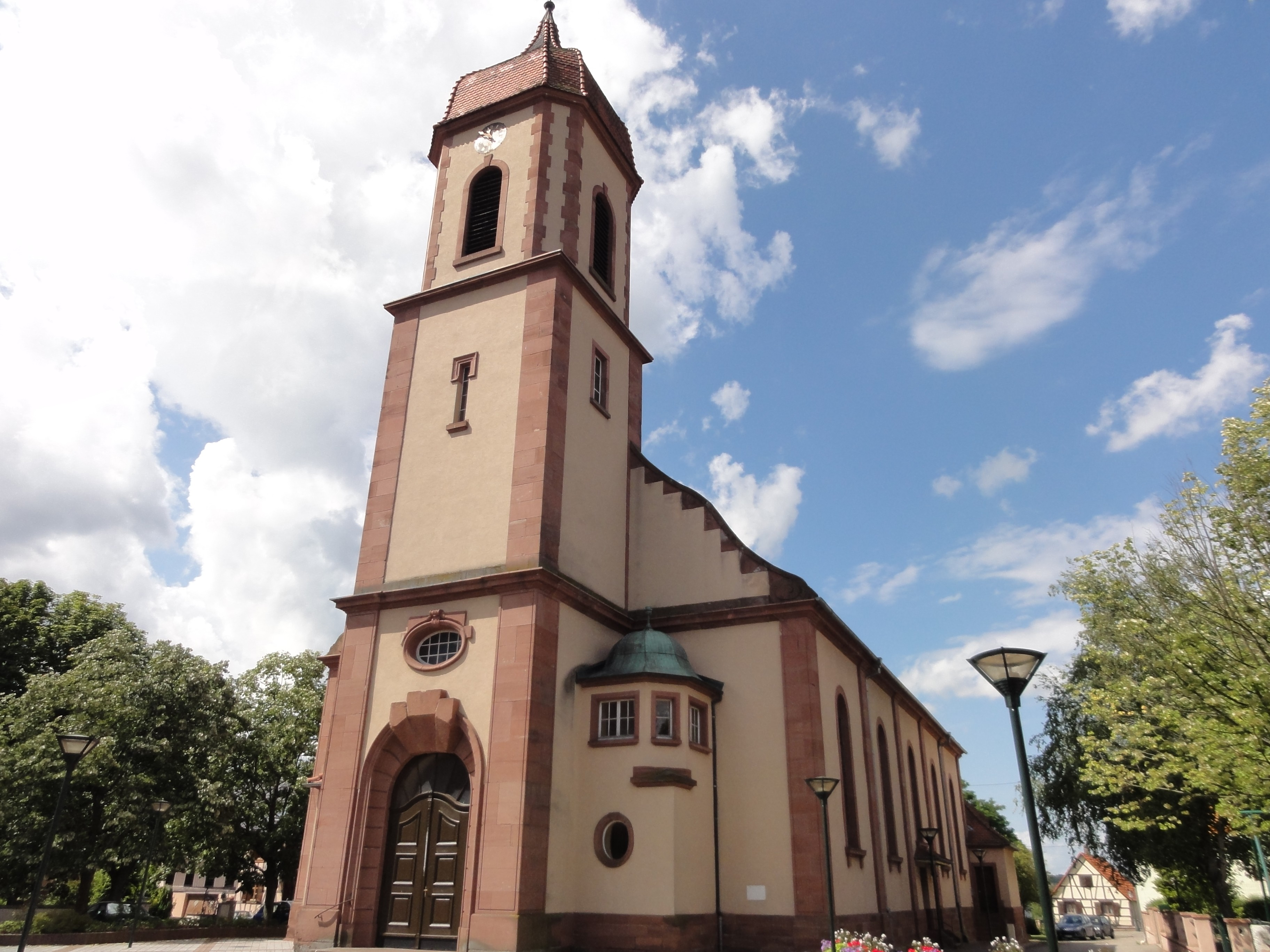
- The church in Durrenbach

- Coat of arms
- Location of Durrenbach
- Location within France Location within Grand Est
- Coordinates: 48°53′49″N 7°46′09″E
- Country: France
- Region: Grand Est
- Department: Bas-Rhin
- Arrondissement: Haguenau-Wissembourg
- Canton: Reichshoffen

Government
  - Mayor (2023–2026): Dominique Siedel
- Area^{1}: 5.3 km^{2} (2.0 sq mi)
- Highest elevation: 181 m (594 ft)
- Lowest elevation: 152 m (499 ft)
- Population (2023): 1,101
  - Density: 210/km^{2} (540/sq mi)
- Time zone: UTC+01:00 (CET)
  - Summer (DST): UTC+02:00 (CEST)
- INSEE/Postal code: 67110 /67360
- ^{1} French Land Register data, which excludes lakes, ponds, glaciers > 1 km^{2} (0.386 sq mi or 247 acres) and river estuaries.

Durrenbach (German: Dürrenbach) is a commune in the Bas-Rhin department in Grand Est in north-eastern France.

== See also ==
- Communes of the Bas-Rhin department
