= Oberdorf-Spachbach =

Oberdorf-Spachbach Owerdorf-Spàchbàch
- Commune
- Coat of arms
- Location of Oberdorf-Spachbach
- Location within France Location within Grand Est
- Coordinates: 48°55′31″N 7°45′30″E
- Country: France
- Region: Grand Est
- Department: Bas-Rhin
- Arrondissement: Haguenau-Wissembourg
- Canton: Reichshoffen
- Intercommunality: Sauer-Pechelbronn

Government
  - Mayor (2020–2026): Dominique Ferbach
- Area^{1}: 2.36 km^{2} (0.91 sq mi)
- Highest elevation: 241 m (791 ft)
- Lowest elevation: 163 m (535 ft)
- Population (2023): 430
  - Density: 180/km^{2} (470/sq mi)
- Time zone: UTC+01:00 (CET)
  - Summer (DST): UTC+02:00 (CEST)
- INSEE/Postal code: 67341 /67360
- ^{1} French Land Register data, which excludes lakes, ponds, glaciers > 1 km^{2} (0.386 sq mi or 247 acres) and river estuaries.

Oberdorf-Spachbach is a commune in the Bas-Rhin department in Grand Est in north-eastern France.

== Population ==
Historical population
Year	Pop.	±% p.a.
1968	230	—
1975	240	+0.61%
1982	285	+2.49%
1990	349	+2.56%
1999	333	−0.52%
2007	342	+0.33%
2012	363	+1.20%
2017	363	+0.00%
2023	430	+2.86%
Source: INSEE

== See also ==
- Communes of the Bas-Rhin department
