= Oberdorf, Haut-Rhin =

Part of Illtal in Grand Est, France

Oberdorf
- Part of Illtal
- Coat of arms
- Location of Oberdorf
- Location within France Location within Grand Est
- Coordinates: 47°33′34″N 7°18′29″E
- Country: France
- Region: Grand Est
- Department: Haut-Rhin
- Arrondissement: Altkirch
- Canton: Altkirch
- Commune: Illtal
- Area^{1}: 4.13 km^{2} (1.59 sq mi)
- Elevation: 347 m (1,138 ft)
- Highest elevation: 436 m (1,430 ft)
- Lowest elevation: 339 m (1,112 ft)
- Population (2019): 570
  - Density: 140/km^{2} (360/sq mi)
- Time zone: UTC+01:00 (CET)
  - Summer (DST): UTC+02:00 (CEST)
- Postal code: 68960
- ^{1} French Land Register data, which excludes lakes, ponds, glaciers > 1 km^{2} (0.386 sq mi or 247 acres) and river estuaries.

Oberdorf is a former commune in the Haut-Rhin department in north-eastern France. On 1 January 2016, it was merged into the new commune Illtal.

== See also ==
- Communes of the Haut-Rhin department
