= Morsbronn-les-Bains =

Morsbronn-les-Bains Morschbrunn
- Commune
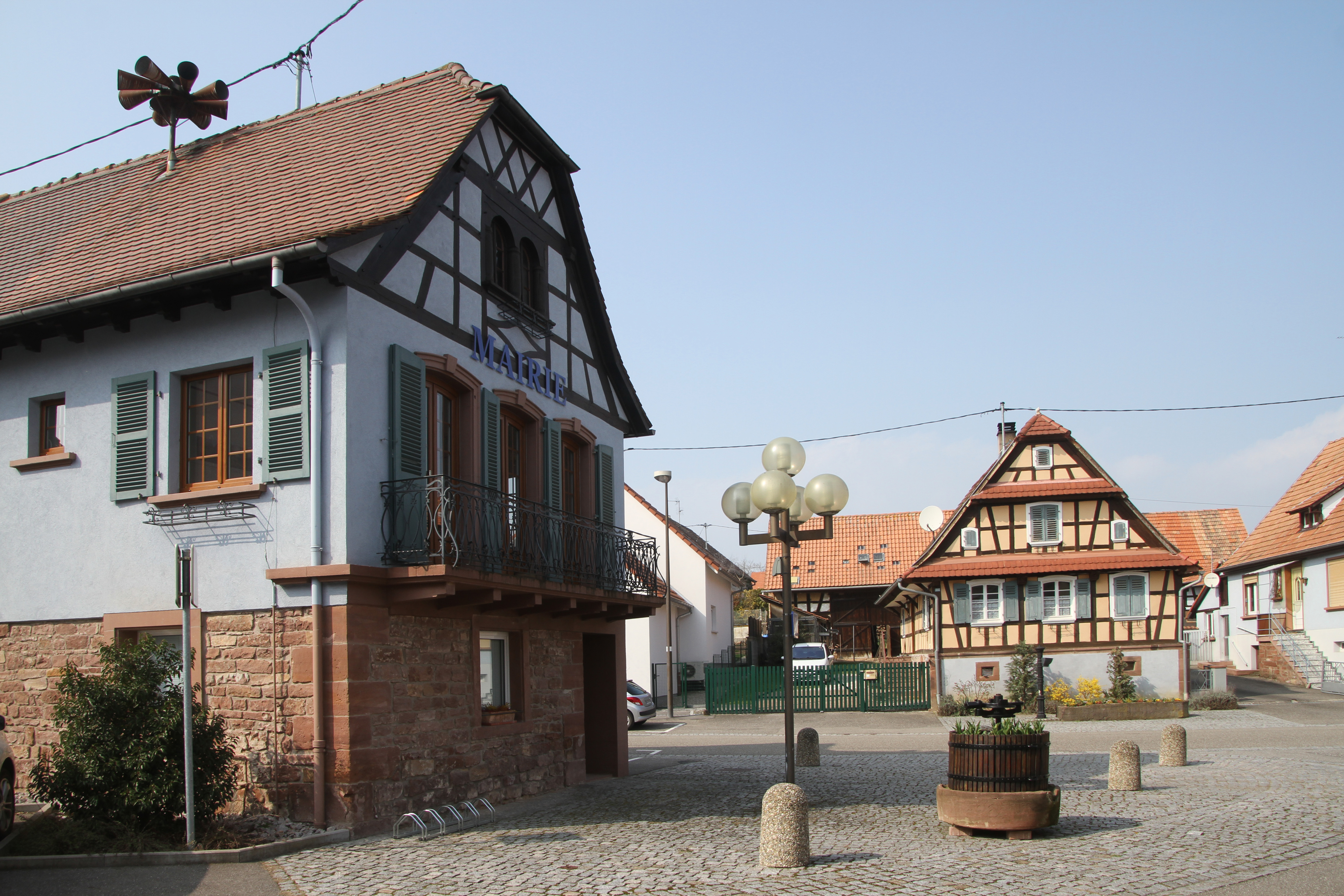
- The town hall in Morsbronn-les-Bains

- Coat of arms
- Location of Morsbronn-les-Bains
- Location within France Location within Grand Est
- Coordinates: 48°54′03″N 7°44′34″E
- Country: France
- Region: Grand Est
- Department: Bas-Rhin
- Arrondissement: Haguenau-Wissembourg
- Canton: Reichshoffen

Government
  - Mayor (2020–2026): Lysianne Dudt
- Area^{1}: 6.87 km^{2} (2.65 sq mi)
- Highest elevation: 237 m (778 ft)
- Lowest elevation: 160 m (520 ft)
- Population (2023): 686
  - Density: 99.9/km^{2} (259/sq mi)
- Time zone: UTC+01:00 (CET)
  - Summer (DST): UTC+02:00 (CEST)
- INSEE/Postal code: 67303 /67360
- ^{1} French Land Register data, which excludes lakes, ponds, glaciers > 1 km^{2} (0.386 sq mi or 247 acres) and river estuaries.

Morsbronn-les-Bains (French pronunciation: [mɔʁsbʁɔn le bɛ̃]; German: Morsbronn; Alsatian: Morschbrunn) is a commune in the Bas-Rhin department in Grand Est in north-eastern France.

== See also ==
- Communes of the Bas-Rhin department
- Battle of Wörth
