= Oberndorf =

Oberndorf (German: upper village) may refer to the following places:

== Germany ==
- Oberndorf am Neckar, in the district of Rottweil, Baden-Württemberg
- Oberndorf (Rottenburg), a suburb of Rottenburg am Neckar in the district of Tübingen, Baden-Württemberg
- Oberndorf (Schweinfurt), a district of Schweinfurt
- Oberndorf am Lech, in the district of Donau-Ries, Bavaria
- Oberndorf, Lower Saxony, in the district of Cuxhaven, Lower Saxony
- Oberndorf, Rhineland-Palatinate, in the Donnersbergkreis, Rhineland-Palatinate

== Austria ==
- Oberndorf an der Melk, in the district of Scheibbs, Lower Austria
- Oberndorf bei Schwanenstadt, in the district of Vöcklabruck, Upper Austria
- Oberndorf bei Salzburg, in the district of Salzburg-Umgebung, Salzburg
- Oberndorf in Tirol, in the district of Kitzbühel, Tyrol
