= Kriegsheim =

Kriegsheim Kriejse
- Commune
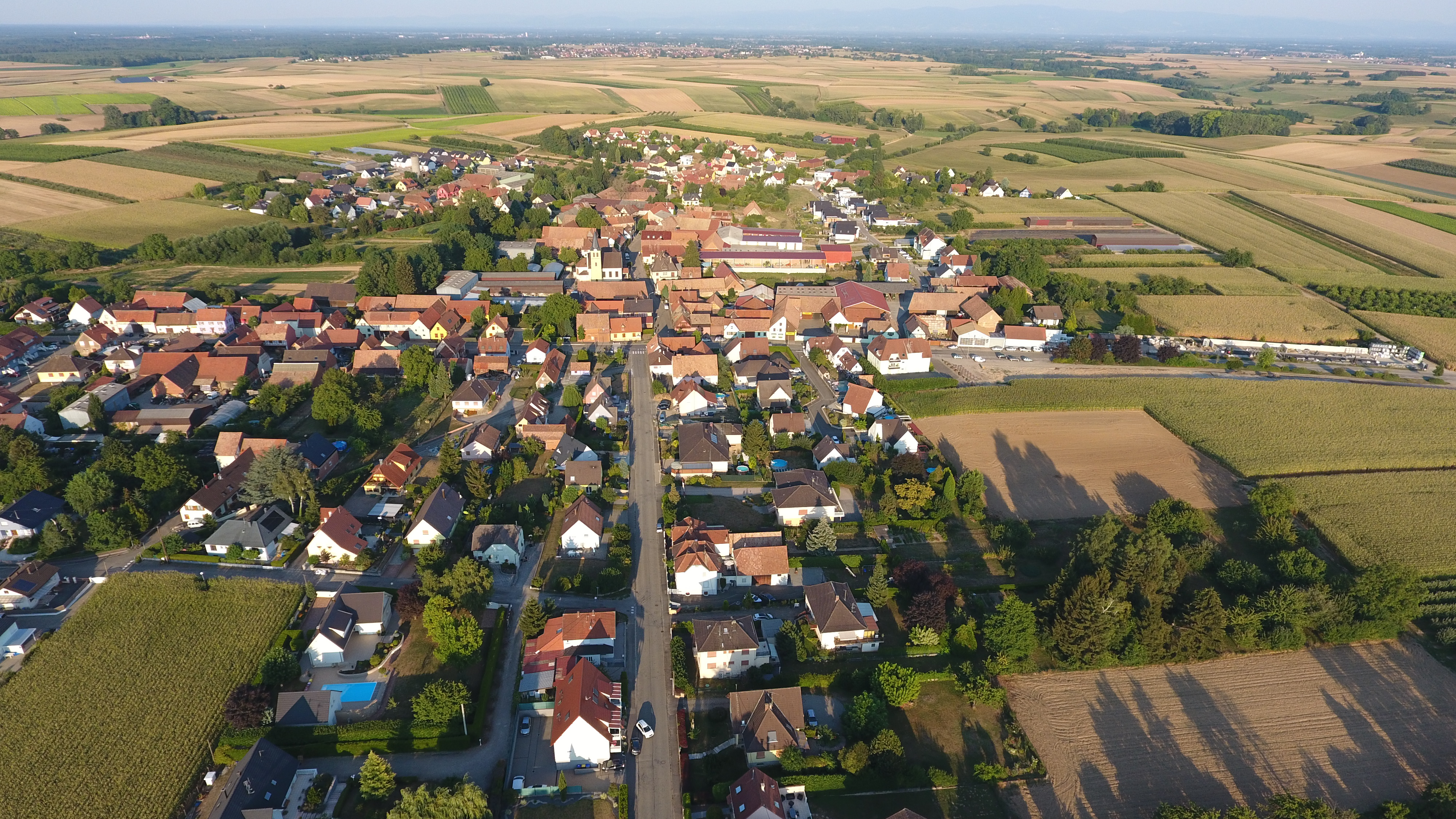
- An aerial view of Kriegsheim

- Coat of arms
- Location of Kriegsheim
- Location within France Location within Grand Est
- Coordinates: 48°45′33″N 7°43′48″E
- Country: France
- Region: Grand Est
- Department: Bas-Rhin
- Arrondissement: Haguenau-Wissembourg
- Canton: Brumath
- Intercommunality: CA Haguenau

Government
  - Mayor (2020–2026): André Burg
- Area^{1}: 3.93 km^{2} (1.52 sq mi)
- Highest elevation: 196 m (643 ft)
- Lowest elevation: 159 m (522 ft)
- Population (2023): 765
  - Density: 195/km^{2} (504/sq mi)
- Time zone: UTC+01:00 (CET)
  - Summer (DST): UTC+02:00 (CEST)
- INSEE/Postal code: 67250 /67170
- ^{1} French Land Register data, which excludes lakes, ponds, glaciers > 1 km^{2} (0.386 sq mi or 247 acres) and river estuaries.

Kriegsheim is a commune in the Bas-Rhin département in Grand Est in north-eastern France.

== Geography ==
Kriegsheim lies 20 kilometres (12 mi) to the north of Strasbourg and 5 kilometres (3 mi) to the southwest of Haguenau, in the Brumath hills on the western edge of the Upper Rhine valley. The Lohgraben, an 11-kilometre long stream that flows into the Moder, has its source in the Kriegsheim commune. (It should not be confused with Kriegsheim in Germany, a village that is now part of the town of Monsheim, Germany.)

Surrounding communes are Niederschaeffolsheim in the north, Weitbruch to the east, Brumath to the south and Rottelsheim in the west.

The departmental road RD263 crosses the village, connecting to Haguenau in the north and the cantonal capital of Brumath five kilometres to the south. Brumath is the access point for the Autoroute A4 linking Paris with Strasbourg, and which here doubles as the European Highway E25.

== History ==
The discovery of Merovingian period graves demonstrates that the area was already settled before the eighth century.

The first surviving written record of the village dates from 823 and occurs in an exchange of documents between Prince Erchanger and Bernold, Bishop of Strasbourg. In 953 the Monastery at Lorsch received a grant of assets in Kriegsheim by imperial decree.

In 1236 Kriegsheim is listed as one of 28 villages in the region subject to shared ownership of the Bishopric of Strasbourg and The Empire.

Following the Habsburgs ascent to the throne, Kriegsheim achieved the privileges of an imperial village, falling within the bailiwick of Haguenau. In terms of civil administration, the village adhereded to the Batzendorf Schultheiß right up until 1789.

In 1460 half of the village was granted to St. Thomas, Strasbourg. At the height of the Thirty Years War, in 1625, Georg Dietrich von Wangen received the other half, which he and his heirs held until the French Revolution.

== Landmarks ==
The church of Saint Ulrich contains a modern organ, installed in 1977/1978 but the original frontage of the 1861 Martin Wetzel organ has been retained.

== See also ==
- Communes of the Bas-Rhin department
