= Gries, Bas-Rhin =

Gries
- Commune
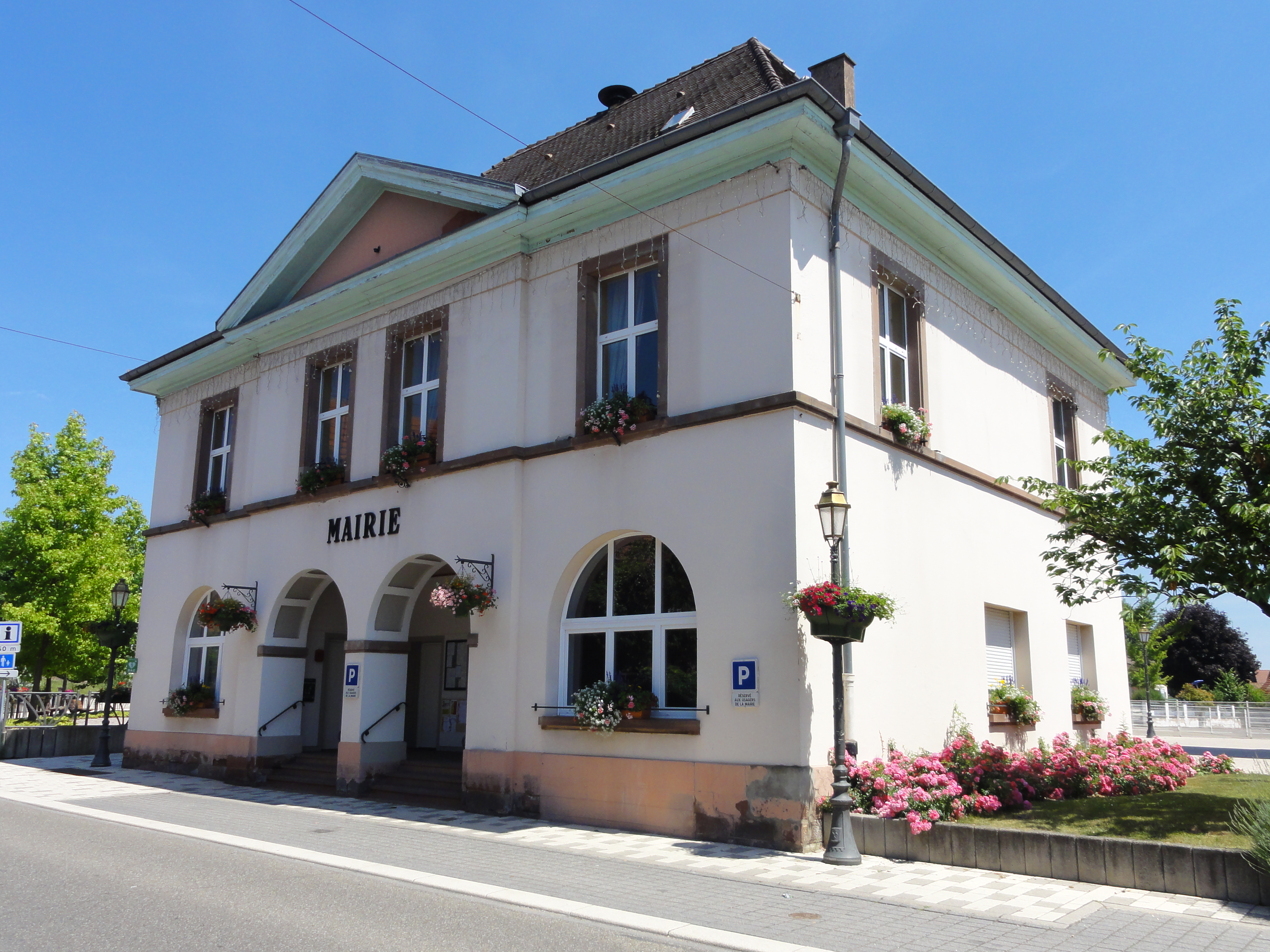
- The town hall in Gries

- Coat of arms
- Location of Gries
- Location within France Location within Grand Est
- Coordinates: 48°45′20″N 7°49′02″E
- Country: France
- Region: Grand Est
- Department: Bas-Rhin
- Arrondissement: Haguenau-Wissembourg
- Canton: Brumath

Government
  - Mayor (2020–2026): Éric Hoffstetter
- Area^{1}: 12.23 km^{2} (4.72 sq mi)
- Highest elevation: 169 m (554 ft)
- Lowest elevation: 125 m (410 ft)
- Population (2023): 2,868
  - Density: 234.5/km^{2} (607.4/sq mi)
- Time zone: UTC+01:00 (CET)
  - Summer (DST): UTC+02:00 (CEST)
- INSEE/Postal code: 67169 /67240
- ^{1} French Land Register data, which excludes lakes, ponds, glaciers > 1 km^{2} (0.386 sq mi or 247 acres) and river estuaries.

Gries (French pronunciation: [ɡʁis]) is a commune in the Bas-Rhin département in Grand Est in north-eastern France. It lies 7 km to the south-southeast of Haguenau.

== Etymology ==
The first document mentioning the name of the village is dated 13 March 826. Gries is mentioned for the first time under the name Gerareshusa. By 830, it is called Gerireshusa.

According to the pastor Guggenbühl the name comes from the given name Gerhard. The name of the village would therefore be in modern standard High German Gerhardshausen, which suggests that it was owned by a certain "Gerhard", whose identity so far has not been discovered.

A document from 974 uses the name Grioz which more closely resembles the current name of the village. Guggenbühl explains that name change as follows: very fast the suffix -hausen of Gerireshausen has been abandoned, the resulting Gerires being transformed over the years first to Grioz, then to Grieze and finally to current Gries.

== History ==
Belonging to the landgraves of Lower Alsace until 1332, the town passed subsequently to Lichtenberg and then to Zweibrücken-Bitsch, before belonging to the count of Hanau-Lichtenberg who introduced the Reformation. Thus its population became Protestant by virtue of the principle cujus regio, ejus religio. In 1622 – during the Thirty Years War – Gries was completely destroyed by the troops of Mansfeld upon which its inhabitants fled to Strasbourg.

To repopulate the region, settlers from Switzerland (Swiss German) came to the town. The landgraves of Hesse-Darmstadt were the last masters of the village from 1736 until the French Revolution, when it was annexed by France. The landgraves contributed significantly to its development.

== Sights ==
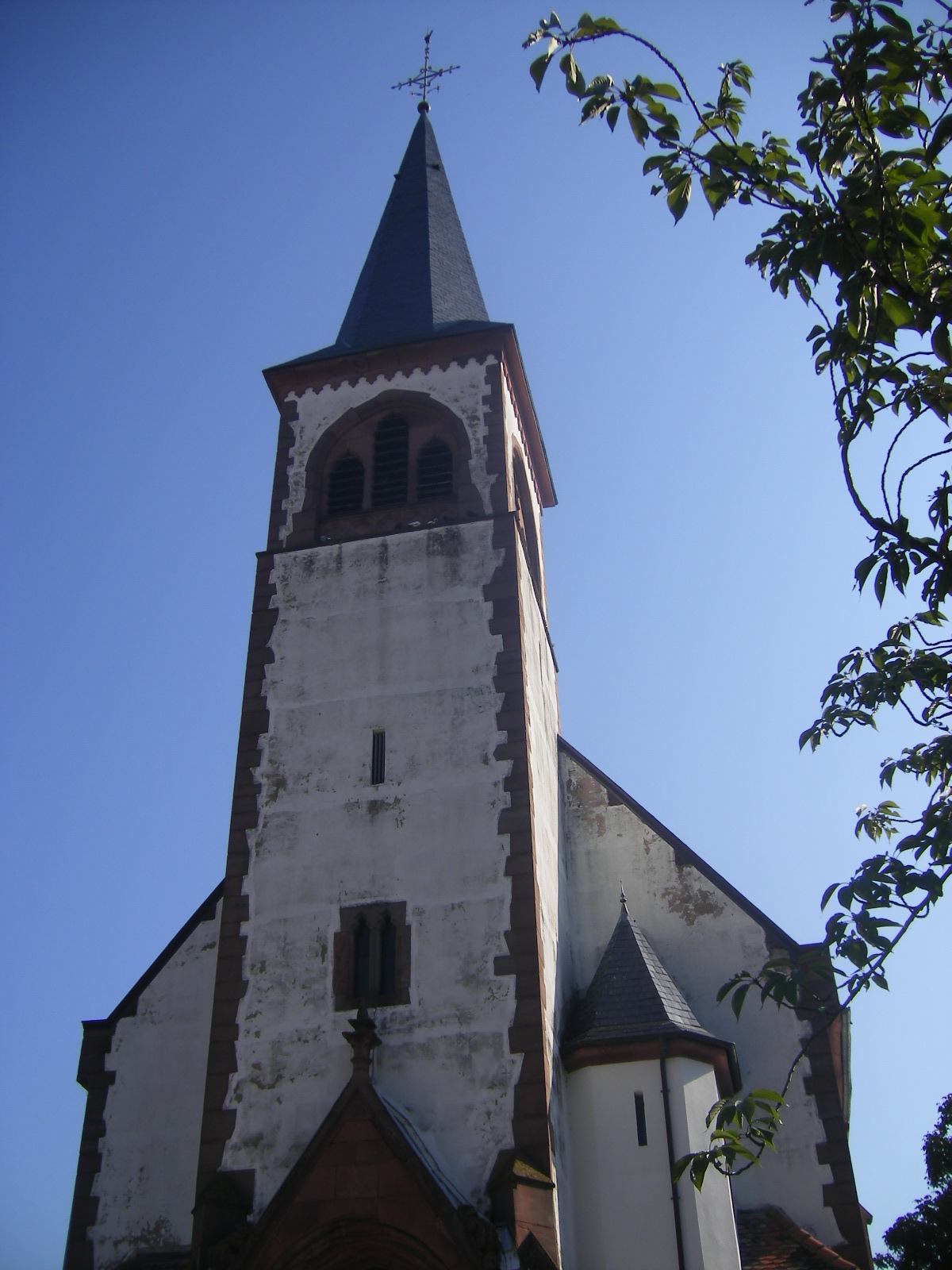

Southeast of the village is a mound, the only remains of an ancient castle, the residence of the bishop of Strasbourg, which remained occupied until the late fifteenth century, when it was destroyed.

=== Organ ===
The Protestant church contains an organ built by Johann Andreas Silbermann in 1781.

== Administration ==
The present mayor is Éric Hoffstetter, elected in 2020. He succeeded Claude Kern, who was in office from 2001 until 2020.

== Demographics ==
Historical population
| Year | Pop. | ±% p.a. |
|---|---|---|
| 1968 | 2,093 | — |
| 1975 | 2,281 | +1.24% |
| 1982 | 2,319 | +0.24% |
| 1990 | 2,464 | +0.76% |
| 1999 | 2,688 | +0.97% |
| 2007 | 2,743 | +0.25% |
| 2012 | 2,791 | +0.35% |
| 2017 | 2,864 | +0.52% |
| 2023 | 2,868 | +0.02% |
Source: INSEE

== Sports ==
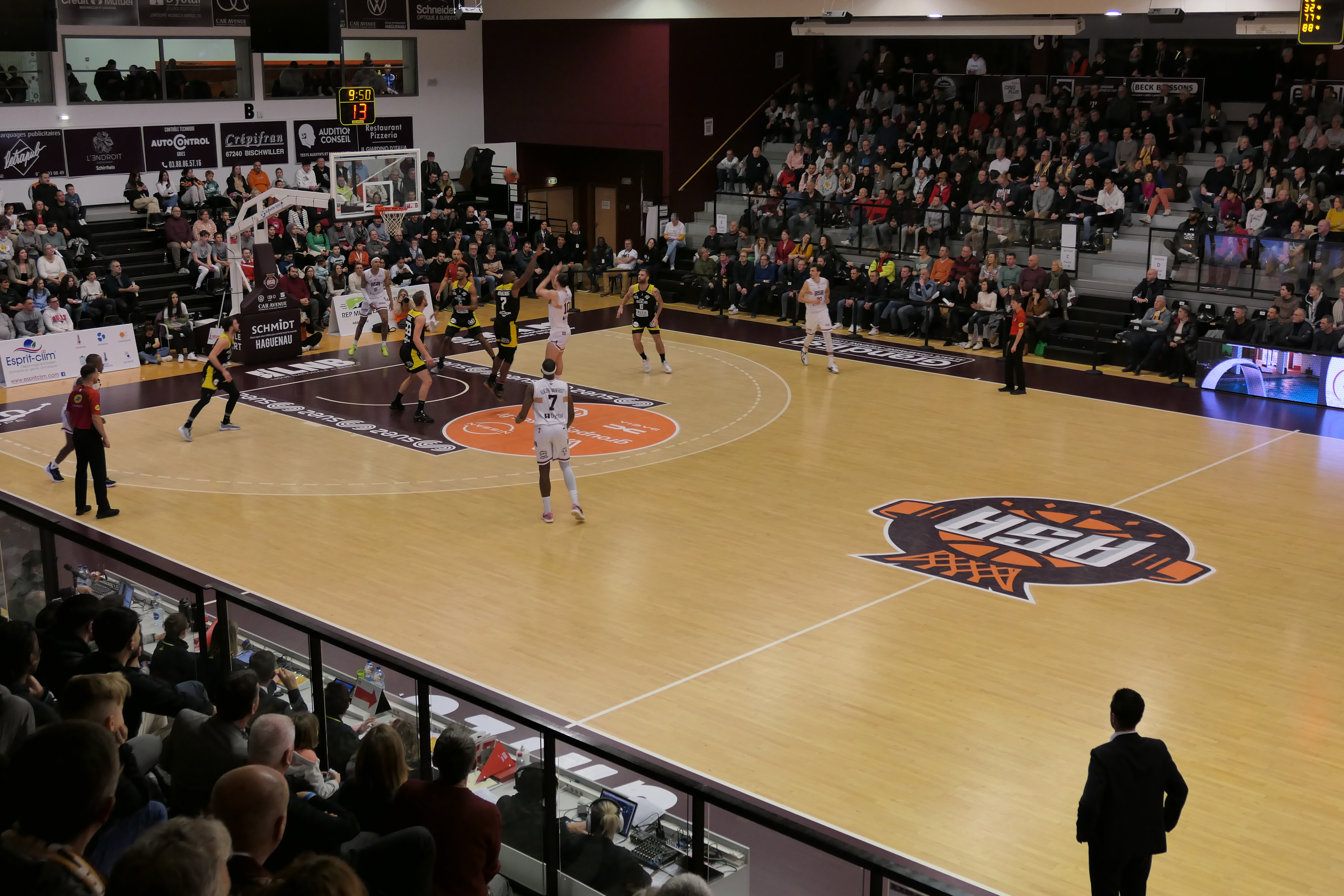
ASA home game in January 2023.

The Espace Sport La Foret is one of the home arenas for the basketball team Alliance Sport Alsace (ASA) of the LNB Pro B.

== Notable people ==
- Andreas Thurman (born 1591 in Gartz, Pomerania, died 6 February 1672 in Gries) was pastor in Gries, Kurtzenhausen, Weitbruch and Geudertheim in 1628–1672. He was also deacon and schoolmaster in Westhoffen in 1622–27, and a preacher of the ducal court in Bischwiller from 1633. He married Maria Pfau, daughter of a brewer, on 28 April 1623 in the Saint-Pierre-le-Jeune Church in Strasbourg. Widowed, he married Anna Barbara Dannhauer on 14 March 1642 at Schiltigheim, becoming the brother-in-law of the theologian Johann Conrad Dannhauer.

== Twin towns – sister cities ==
Gries is twinned with:

- Gries, Rhineland-Palatinate, Germany since 20 May 1979

This other Gries lies in the west of the Palatinate about 20 km west of Kaiserslautern. Since the 1979 establishment of the partnership, it has been well developed. The relatively short distance between Gries (France) and Gries (Germany) – only about 110 km – has made private contacts easy. Even a Palatine-Alsatian marriage, complete with children, has sprung from this partnership. There are regular visits back and forth by each municipality's councils.

== See also ==
- Communes of the Bas-Rhin department
