= Geudertheim =

Geudertheim Gaiderte
- Commune
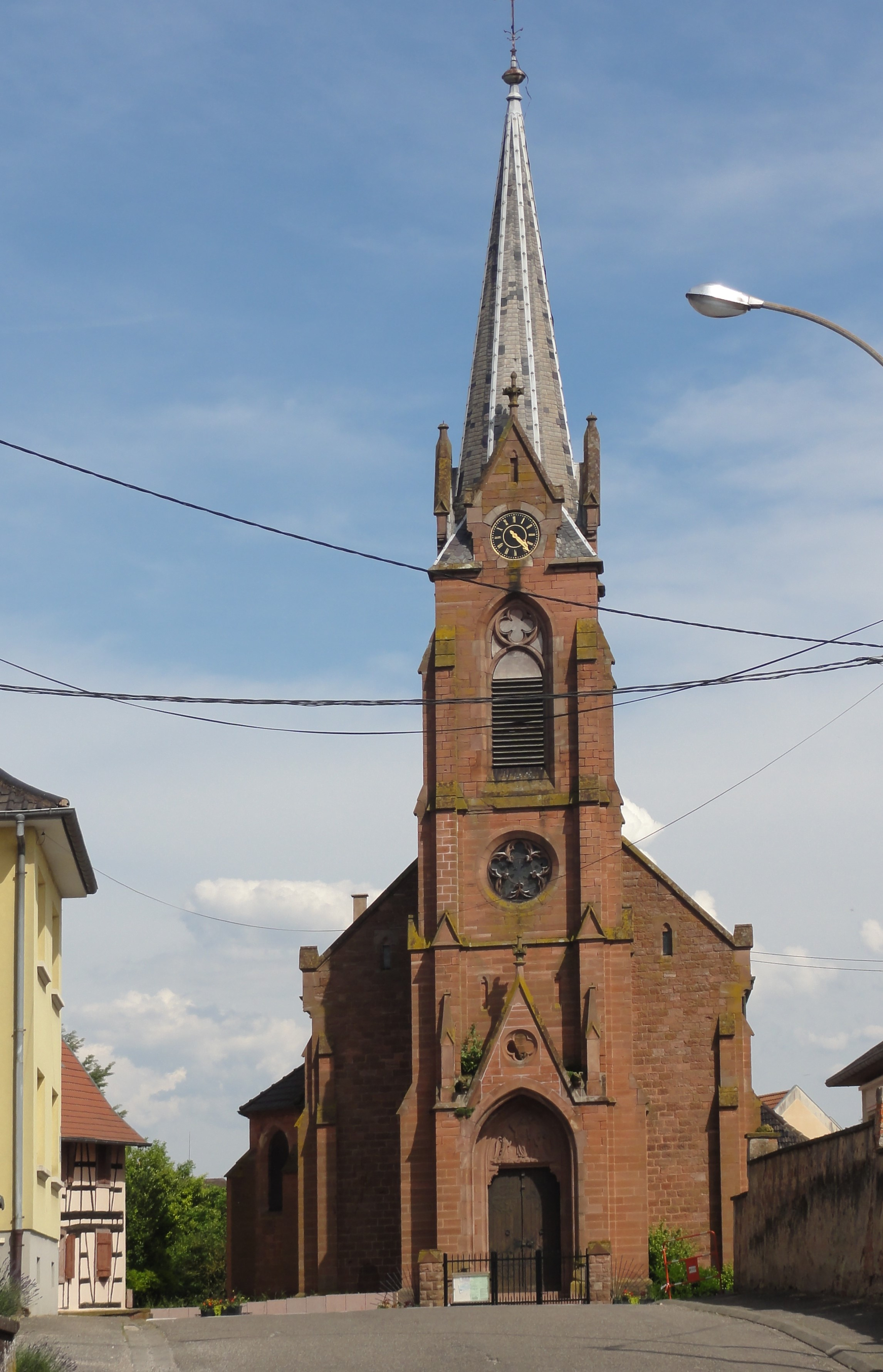
- The church in Geudertheim

- Coat of arms
- Location of Geudertheim
- Location within France Location within Grand Est
- Coordinates: 48°43′26″N 7°45′19″E
- Country: France
- Region: Grand Est
- Department: Bas-Rhin
- Arrondissement: Haguenau-Wissembourg
- Canton: Brumath

Government
  - Mayor (2020–2026): Pierre Gross
- Area^{1}: 11.27 km^{2} (4.35 sq mi)
- Highest elevation: 188 m (617 ft)
- Lowest elevation: 133 m (436 ft)
- Population (2023): 2,727
  - Density: 242.0/km^{2} (626.7/sq mi)
- Time zone: UTC+01:00 (CET)
  - Summer (DST): UTC+02:00 (CEST)
- INSEE/Postal code: 67156 /67170
- ^{1} French Land Register data, which excludes lakes, ponds, glaciers > 1 km^{2} (0.386 sq mi or 247 acres) and river estuaries.

Geudertheim is a commune in the Bas-Rhin department in Grand Est in north-eastern France.

== Geography ==
Geudertheim is a village in the Basse Zorn district, in the heart of the Alsace Asparagus Country, positioned halfway between Haguenau and Strasbourg. The Rhine and the German frontier are 15 kilometres (9 mi) to the east. Neighbouring villages are Hœrdt to the south, Bietlenheim to the east, Brumath to the west and Weitbruch to the north.

== Population ==
Historical population
Year	Pop.	±% p.a.
1968	1,450	—
1975	1,600	+1.42%
1982	1,755	+1.33%
1990	2,010	+1.71%
1999	2,243	+1.23%
2007	2,287	+0.24%
2012	2,310	+0.20%
2017	2,530	+1.84%
2023	2,727	+1.26%
Source: INSEE

== Notable people ==
- General Georges Picquart, who played a key role in the Dreyfus Affair, spent his early childhood in Geudertheim. On 13 July 2006, almost a century after the exoneration of Dreyfus, the Place de la Mairie was renamed Place General Picquart in his honour.
- Balthazar Alexis Henri Schauenburg, (also spelled Schauenbourg), (born in Hellimer on 31 July 1748) died in Geudertheim on 1 September 1831) was a French general who served in the wars of the French Revolution and the Empire.

== Landmarks ==
- The Protestant church dates from 1842: the church tower is from the twelfth century, however.
- The Roman Catholic Church dates from 1900. Attached to it is the fifteenth-century funerary chapel of the Schauenbourg family along with a fifteenth-century tabernacle considered one of the most beautiful in Alsace.
- Castle Schauenbourg.
- A mill on the river Zorn.

== See also ==
- Communes of the Bas-Rhin department
