= Krautwiller =

Krautwiller Krütwiller
- Commune
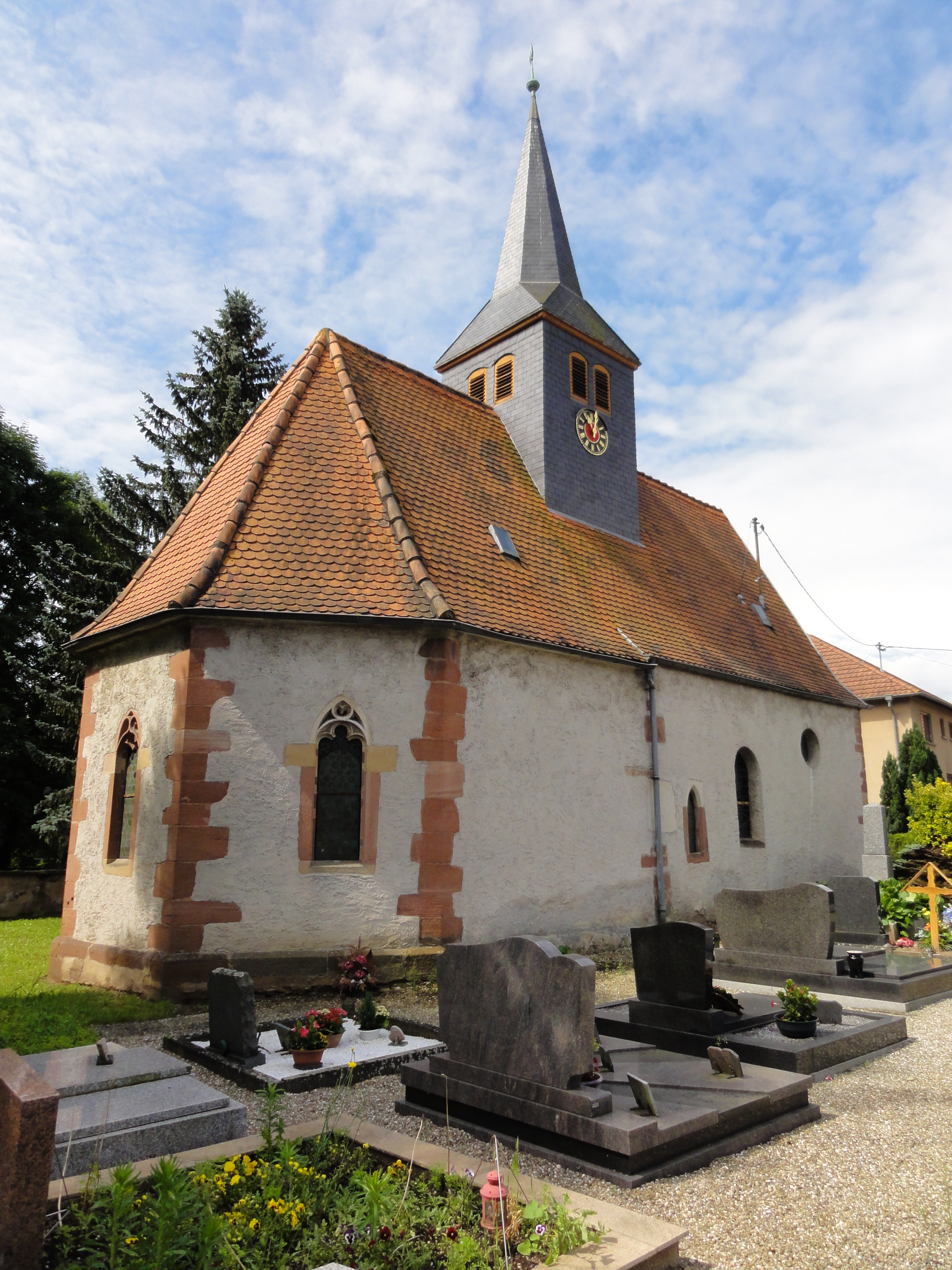
- The Protestant church in Krautwiller

- Coat of arms
- Location of Krautwiller
- Location within France Location within Grand Est
- Coordinates: 48°40′36″N 7°14′55″E
- Country: France
- Region: Grand Est
- Department: Bas-Rhin
- Arrondissement: Haguenau-Wissembourg
- Canton: Brumath
- Intercommunality: CA Haguenau

Government
  - Mayor (2020–2026): Paul Nolte
- Area^{1}: 1.48 km^{2} (0.57 sq mi)
- Highest elevation: 150 m (490 ft)
- Lowest elevation: 143 m (469 ft)
- Population (2023): 220
  - Density: 150/km^{2} (380/sq mi)
- Time zone: UTC+01:00 (CET)
  - Summer (DST): UTC+02:00 (CEST)
- INSEE/Postal code: 67249 /67170
- ^{1} French Land Register data, which excludes lakes, ponds, glaciers > 1 km^{2} (0.386 sq mi or 247 acres) and river estuaries.

Krautwiller (German: Krautweiler) is a commune in the Bas-Rhin department in Grand Est in north-eastern France.

== Geography ==
Krautwiller is positioned close northwest to Brumath.

== History ==
In a transaction document dating from 742, the settlement is named as "Chrodoltesvillare".

In the medieval period, until 1504, the parish was administratively dependent on Wingersheim.

== Landmarks ==
The chapel has a nave dating back to the eleventh century. A Romanesque doorway (today walled up) was originally the entrance to this ancient chapel dedicated to Saint Ulrich.

== See also ==
- Communes of the Bas-Rhin department
