= Musée archéologique =

Musée archéologique may refer to:

- Musée archéologique (Brumath)
- Musée archéologique de Lattes, a museum in Hérault, France
- Musée archéologique (Strasbourg)
