= Hoerdt =

Hoerdt may refer to:

- Hördt, a municipality in the district of Germersheim, in Rhineland-Palatinate, Germany
- Hœrdt, a commune in the Bas-Rhin department in France
