= Friedrich Heinrich von Gottesheim =

- Born: January 1749; Geudertheim, France
- Died: 5 April 1808 (aged 59); Prague, Austrian Empire
- Military career
- Allegiance: Kingdom of France, Habsburg monarchy, Austrian Empire
- Service years: 1793 (Note: Entered in Habsburg service.)-1808
- Rank: Feldmarschallleutnant
- Conflicts: French Revolutionary Wars, War of the Third Coalition
- Awards: Military Order of Maria Theresa (Knight's Cross); Inhaber of the Cuirassier Regiment N°6

Friedrich Heinrich Freiherr von Gottesheim (1749 in Geudertheim – 5 April 1808 in Prague) was a French soldier and Austrian commander in the time of the French Revolutionary Wars and the War of the Third Coalition.
