= Mommenheim, Bas-Rhin =

Mommenheim Mummle
- Commune
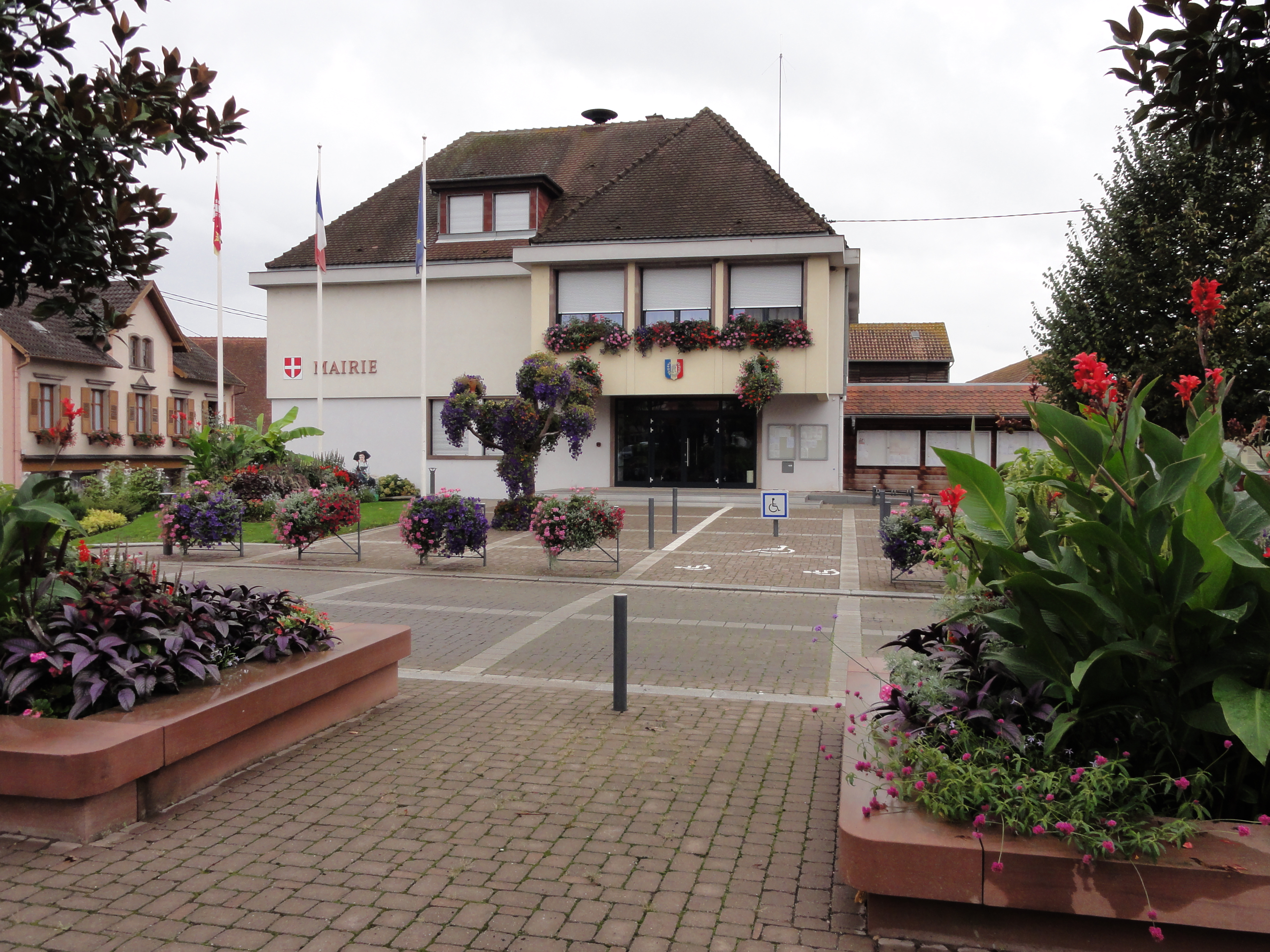
- The town hall in Mommenheim

- Coat of arms
- Location of Mommenheim
- Location within France Location within Grand Est
- Coordinates: 48°45′30″N 7°38′42″E
- Country: France
- Region: Grand Est
- Department: Bas-Rhin
- Arrondissement: Haguenau-Wissembourg
- Canton: Brumath
- Intercommunality: CA Haguenau

Government
  - Mayor (2020–2026): Francis Wolf
- Area^{1}: 8.16 km^{2} (3.15 sq mi)
- Highest elevation: 192 m (630 ft)
- Lowest elevation: 146 m (479 ft)
- Population (2023): 2,340
  - Density: 287/km^{2} (743/sq mi)
- Time zone: UTC+01:00 (CET)
  - Summer (DST): UTC+02:00 (CEST)
- INSEE/Postal code: 67301 /67670
- ^{1} French Land Register data, which excludes lakes, ponds, glaciers > 1 km^{2} (0.386 sq mi or 247 acres) and river estuaries.

Mommenheim (French pronunciation: [mɔmənaim]; Alsatian: Mummle) is a commune in the Bas-Rhin department. The department is in the historic Alsace region of France, and is itself within the Grand Est administrative region of north-eastern France.

== History ==
The first written mention of Mommenheim dates back to the mid 10th century, under the name of Mumlen. In 953, Emperor Otto I. gave his property to the Lorsch Abbey. Mommenheim was a village under the reign of the Holy Roman Empire.

The town was spared the Swedish occupation during the Thirty Years' War.

In 1733, the village was largely destroyed by a large fire, fed among other things by multiple hay barns in the commune.

In 1850, the station of Mommenheim is built, it is on the way of the line Strasbourg-Sarrebourg, inaugurated the following year.

The line linking Mommenheim and Sarreguemines was inaugurated in 1895.

In 1898, the first fire brigade of the commune was created.

In 1871, Mommenheim was attached to Germany at the same time as Alsace and Moselle.

During the First World War, 1917, village bells were used in the manufacture of ammunition.

After the Second World War, the number of inhabitants from the Jewish community, which accounted for up to a third of the village's population in 1898, declined sharply.

== Population ==
Historical population
Year	Pop.	±% p.a.
1968	1,410	—
1975	1,602	+1.84%
1982	1,621	+0.17%
1990	1,702	+0.61%
1999	1,751	+0.32%
2007	1,825	+0.52%
2012	1,765	−0.67%
2017	1,897	+1.45%
2023	2,340	+3.56%
Source: INSEE

== Landmarks ==
The nineteenth century synagogue survived the war and can be seen while crossing the Rue des Juifs.

== Twin towns and sister cities ==
Mommenheim is twinned with:

- Bühl (formerly Vimbuch), Germany

== See also ==
- Communes of the Bas-Rhin department
- List of Imperial Villages
