= Bernolsheim =

Bernolsheim Banze
- Commune
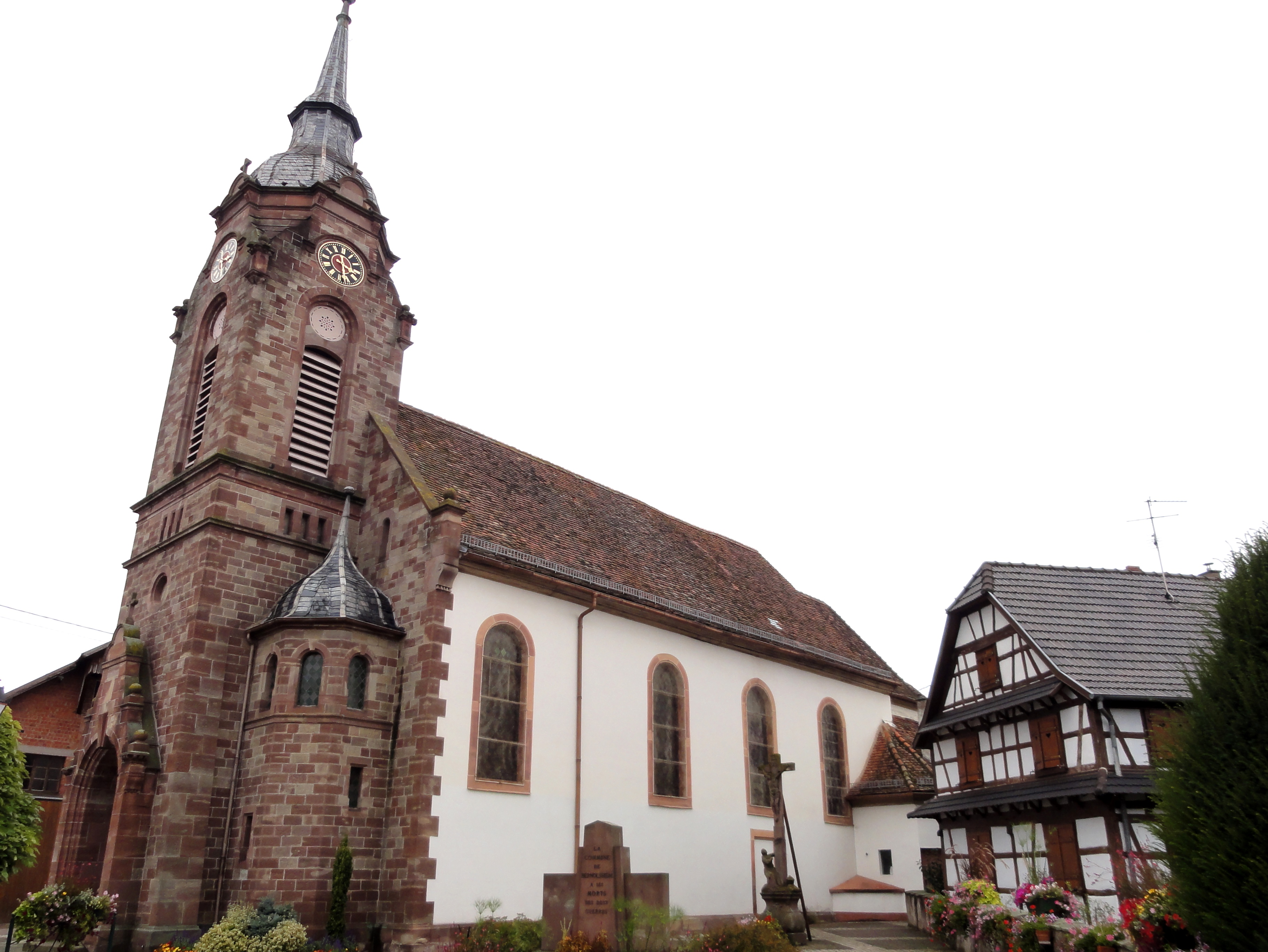
- The church in Bernolsheim

- Coat of arms
- Location of Bernolsheim
- Location within France Location within Grand Est
- Coordinates: 48°45′24″N 7°41′26″E
- Country: France
- Region: Grand Est
- Department: Bas-Rhin
- Arrondissement: Haguenau-Wissembourg
- Canton: Brumath
- Intercommunality: CA Haguenau

Government
  - Mayor (2020–2026): Jean-Marc Diersé
- Area^{1}: 3.39 km^{2} (1.31 sq mi)
- Highest elevation: 191 m (627 ft)
- Lowest elevation: 147 m (482 ft)
- Population (2023): 656
  - Density: 194/km^{2} (501/sq mi)
- Time zone: UTC+01:00 (CET)
  - Summer (DST): UTC+02:00 (CEST)
- INSEE/Postal code: 67033 /67170
- ^{1} French Land Register data, which excludes lakes, ponds, glaciers > 1 km^{2} (0.386 sq mi or 247 acres) and river estuaries.

Bernolsheim is a commune in the Bas-Rhin department in Grand Est in northeastern France.

== Population ==
Historical population
Year	Pop.	±% p.a.
1968	272	—
1975	298	+1.31%
1982	338	+1.82%
1990	436	+3.23%
1999	510	+1.76%
2007	548	+0.90%
2012	615	+2.33%
2017	602	−0.43%
2023	656	+1.44%
Source: INSEE

== See also ==
- Communes of the Bas-Rhin department
