= Donnenheim =

Donnenheim Dunnene
- Commune
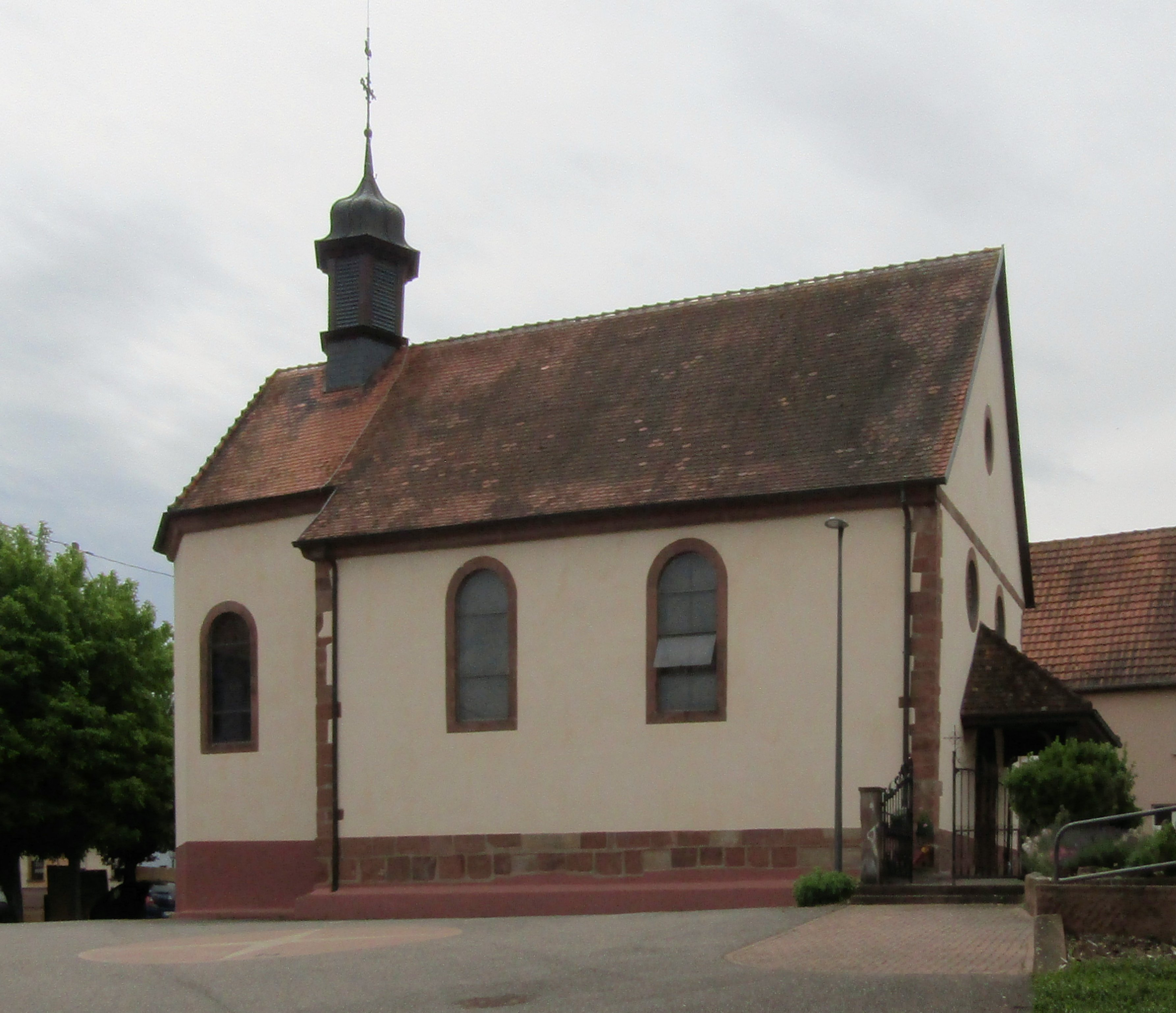
- The church in Donnenheim

- Coat of arms
- Location of Donnenheim
- Location within France Location within Grand Est
- Coordinates: 48°43′07″N 7°39′09″E
- Country: France
- Region: Grand Est
- Department: Bas-Rhin
- Arrondissement: Haguenau-Wissembourg
- Canton: Brumath
- Intercommunality: CA Haguenau

Government
  - Mayor (2020–2026): Stéphan Schissele
- Area^{1}: 3.76 km^{2} (1.45 sq mi)
- Highest elevation: 189 m (620 ft)
- Lowest elevation: 143 m (469 ft)
- Population (2023): 367
  - Density: 97.6/km^{2} (253/sq mi)
- Time zone: UTC+01:00 (CET)
  - Summer (DST): UTC+02:00 (CEST)
- INSEE/Postal code: 67100 /67170
- ^{1} French Land Register data, which excludes lakes, ponds, glaciers > 1 km^{2} (0.386 sq mi or 247 acres) and river estuaries.

Donnenheim (French pronunciation: [dɔnənaim]) is a commune in the Bas-Rhin department in Grand Est in north-eastern France. As with other parts of Alsace and Bas-Rhin, Donnenheim has had periods under German rule, and its name is Germanic. Donnenheim has been part of France since 1790, with an interlude of German rule 1871-1919.

The village has a church, a town hall with library, and a multi-purpose community hall.

== See also ==
- Communes of the Bas-Rhin department
