= Canton of Brumath =

Coordinates: 48.73°N 7.71°E

- Canton
- Situation of the canton of Brumath in the department of Bas-Rhin
- Country: France
- Region: Grand Est
- Department: Bas-Rhin
- No. of communes: {{{nbcomm}}}
- Population (2023): 55,861
- INSEE code: 6703

The canton of Brumath is an administrative division of the Bas-Rhin department, northeastern France. Its borders were modified at the French canton reorganisation which came into effect in March 2015. Its seat is in Brumath.

It consists of the following communes:

1. Bernolsheim
2. Bietlenheim
3. Bilwisheim
4. Brumath
5. Donnenheim
6. Eckwersheim
7. Gambsheim
8. Geudertheim
9. Gries
10. Hœrdt
11. Kilstett
12. Krautwiller
13. Kriegsheim
14. Kurtzenhouse
15. Mittelschaeffolsheim
16. Mommenheim
17. Olwisheim
18. Rottelsheim
19. Vendenheim
20. La Wantzenau
21. Weitbruch
22. Weyersheim
