= Alliance Sport Alsace =

ASA
- League: LNB Pro B
- Founded: 2021
- History: Alliance Sport Alsace; 2021–present
- Arena: Espace Sport La Foret; Salle des Sept Arpents
- Location: Souffelweyersheim and Gries, France
- President: Romuald Roeckel; Éric Mittelhaeuser
- Head coach: Julien Espinosa
Home	Away

The Alliance Sport Alsace, simply known as ASA, is a French professional basketball club based in Souffelweyersheim and Gries. Founded in 2021, the team plays in the LNB Pro B.

== History ==
The club was formed in 2021 by the merger of five clubs: BC Gries-Oberhoffen, BC Souffelweyersheim, BC Nord Alsace, Weyersheim BB and Walbourg-Eschbach Basket.

== Players ==
=== Roster ===
Note: Flags indicate national team eligibility at FIBA-sanctioned events. Players may hold other non-FIBA nationalities not displayed.

Alliance Sport Alsace roster
Players
Coaches

Pos.	No.	Nat.	Name
PG	3	(France)	Nathan De Sousa
SF	7	(France)	Cyrille Eliezer-Vanerot
PF	9	(France)	Leopold Ca
F/C	10	(Serbia)	Strahinja Gavrilovic
G	11	(Spain)	Tom Digbeu
PF	12	(Senegal)	Hassane Gueye
F/C	13	(France)	Jerome Cazenobe
G	20	(France)	Sofiane Briki
PG	29	(Lithuania)	Dovydas Redikas
F	32	(United States)	Christian Nwogbo
SG	77	(France)	Anthony Racine
PG	88	(United States)	Jamar Diggs

Head coach

(France) Julien Espinosa

Assistant coach(es)

(France) Old Lo

Legend

- (C) Team captain
- Injured

- Roster
Updated: 14 January 2023

== Notable players ==
To appear in this section a player must have either:

- Set a club record or won an individual award as a professional player.
- Played at least one official international match for his senior national team at any time.

- (Central African Republic) Jimmy Djimrabaye
- (United States) Kyan Anderson
