= Bilwisheim =

Bilwisheim Bílse
- Commune
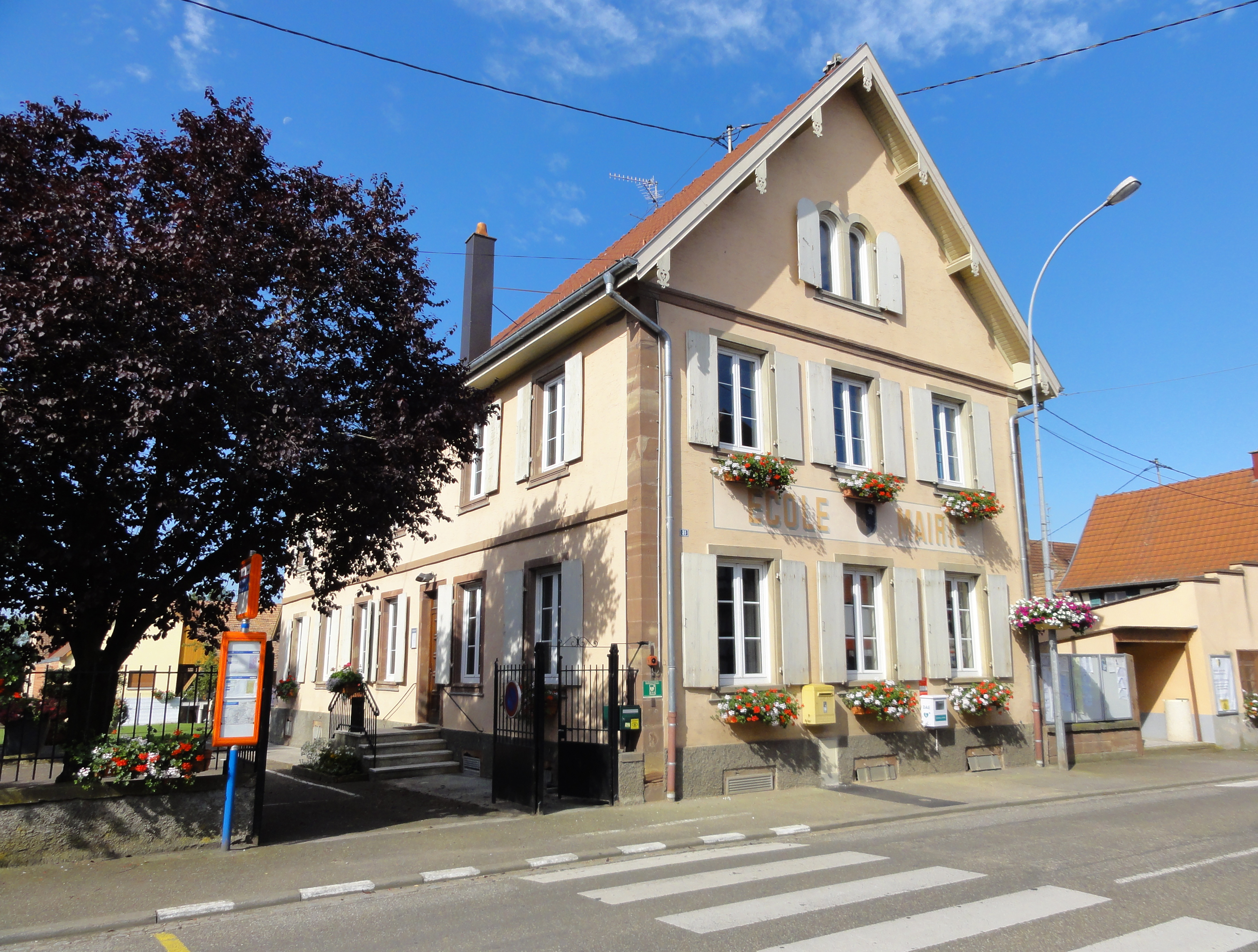
- The town hall in Bilwisheim

- Coat of arms
- Location of Bilwisheim
- Location within France Location within Grand Est
- Coordinates: 48°42′38″N 7°39′34″E
- Country: France
- Region: Grand Est
- Department: Bas-Rhin
- Arrondissement: Haguenau-Wissembourg
- Canton: Brumath
- Intercommunality: CA Haguenau

Government
  - Mayor (2020–2026): Patrick Denni
- Area^{1}: 2.56 km^{2} (0.99 sq mi)
- Highest elevation: 189 m (620 ft)
- Lowest elevation: 149 m (489 ft)
- Population (2023): 535
  - Density: 209/km^{2} (541/sq mi)
- Time zone: UTC+01:00 (CET)
  - Summer (DST): UTC+02:00 (CEST)
- INSEE/Postal code: 67039 /67170
- ^{1} French Land Register data, which excludes lakes, ponds, glaciers > 1 km^{2} (0.386 sq mi or 247 acres) and river estuaries.

Bilwisheim (French pronunciation: [bilvisaim]; Alsatian: Bílse) is a commune in the Bas-Rhin department in Grand Est in northeastern France.

== Population ==
Historical population
Year	Pop.	±% p.a.
1968	216	—
1975	250	+2.11%
1982	284	+1.84%
1990	332	+1.97%
1999	387	+1.72%
2007	424	+1.15%
2012	390	−1.66%
2017	467	+3.67%
2023	535	+2.29%
Source: INSEE

== See also ==
- Communes of the Bas-Rhin department
