= Weyersheim =

- Commune
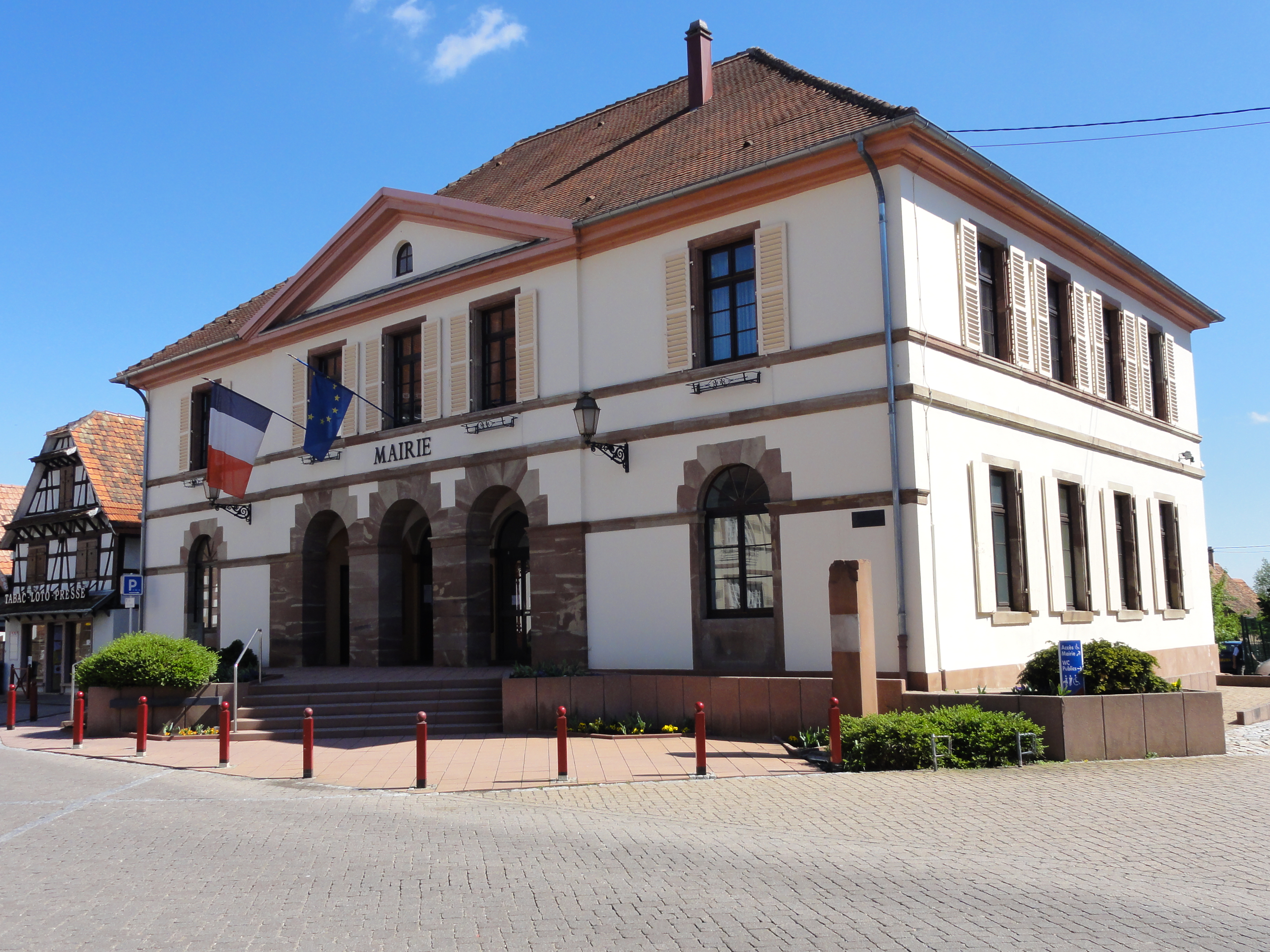
- The town hall in Weyersheim

- Coat of arms
- Location of Weyersheim
- Location within France Location within Grand Est
- Coordinates: 48°43′02″N 7°48′17″E
- Country: France
- Region: Grand Est
- Department: Bas-Rhin
- Arrondissement: Haguenau-Wissembourg
- Canton: Brumath
- Intercommunality: Basse-Zorn

Government
  - Mayor (2020–2026): Sylvie Roehlly
- Area^{1}: 18.89 km^{2} (7.29 sq mi)
- Elevation: 140 m (460 ft)
- Highest elevation: 158 m (518 ft)
- Lowest elevation: 124 m (407 ft)
- Population (2023): 3,512
  - Density: 185.9/km^{2} (481.5/sq mi)
- Time zone: UTC+01:00 (CET)
  - Summer (DST): UTC+02:00 (CEST)
- INSEE/Postal code: 67529 /67720
- ^{1} French Land Register data, which excludes lakes, ponds, glaciers > 1 km^{2} (0.386 sq mi or 247 acres) and river estuaries.

Weyersheim is a commune in the Bas-Rhin department in Grand Est in north-eastern France.

== Population ==
Historical population
Year	Pop.	±% p.a.
1968	2,456	—
1975	2,612	+0.88%
1982	2,758	+0.78%
1990	2,817	+0.26%
1999	2,993	+0.68%
2007	3,182	+0.77%
2012	3,353	+1.05%
2017	3,356	+0.02%
2023	3,512	+0.76%
Source: INSEE

== Twin towns ==
Weyersheim is twinned with:

- Rot am See, Germany, since 2000

== See also ==
- Communes of the Bas-Rhin department
