= Chatte =

- Commune
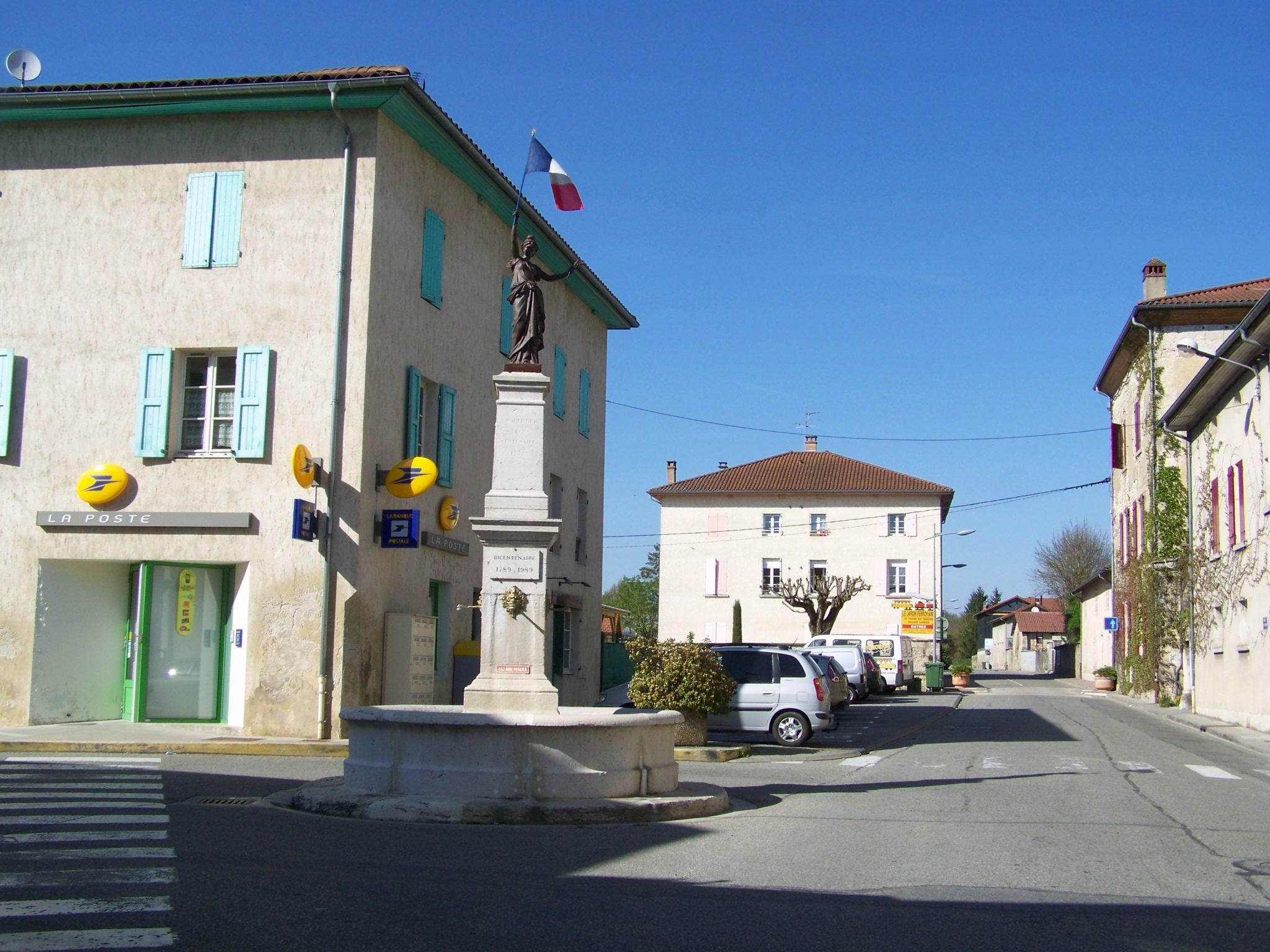
- The village centre of Chatte
- Location of Chatte
- Location within France Location within Auvergne-Rhône-Alpes
- Coordinates: 45°08′40″N 5°17′02″E
- Country: France
- Region: Auvergne-Rhône-Alpes
- Department: Isère
- Arrondissement: Grenoble
- Canton: Le Sud Grésivaudan

Government
  - Mayor (2020–2026): André Roux
- Area^{1}: 22.81 km^{2} (8.81 sq mi)
- Elevation: 280 m (920 ft)
- Highest elevation: 443 m (1,453 ft)
- Lowest elevation: 164 m (538 ft)
- Population (2023): 2,518
  - Density: 110.4/km^{2} (285.9/sq mi)
- Time zone: UTC+01:00 (CET)
  - Summer (DST): UTC+02:00 (CEST)
- INSEE/Postal code: 38095 /38160
- ^{1} French Land Register data, which excludes lakes, ponds, glaciers > 1 km^{2} (0.386 sq mi or 247 acres) and river estuaries.

Chatte (French pronunciation: [ʃat]) is a commune in the Isère department in southeastern France. Its natural environment is essentially made up of hills and hillsides which dominate the Isère valley.

== Population ==
Historical population

Year	Pop.	±% p.a.
1793	1,773	—
1800	1,776	+0.02%
1806	2,105	+2.87%
1821	1,910	−0.65%
1831	2,071	+0.81%
1836	2,192	+1.14%
1841	2,256	+0.58%
1846	2,299	+0.38%
1851	2,443	+1.22%
1856	2,333	−0.92%
1861	2,347	+0.12%
1866	2,116	−2.05%
1872	2,118	+0.02%
1876	2,039	−0.95%
1881	1,898	−1.42%
1886	1,911	+0.14%
1891	1,905	−0.06%
1896	1,885	−0.21%
1901	1,852	−0.35%

Year	Pop.	±% p.a.
1906	1,750	−1.13%
1911	1,768	+0.20%
1921	1,532	−1.42%
1926	1,562	+0.39%
1931	1,602	+0.51%
1936	1,542	−0.76%
1946	1,533	−0.06%
1954	1,605	+0.58%
1962	1,705	+0.76%
1968	1,737	+0.31%
1975	1,892	+1.23%
1982	2,040	+1.08%
1990	2,347	+1.77%
1999	2,442	+0.44%
2007	2,489	+0.24%
2012	2,436	−0.43%
2017	2,512	+0.62%
2023	2,518	+0.04%

Source: EHESS and INSEE (1968-2023)

== Twin towns ==
Chatte is twinned with:

- Roncone, Italy, since 1998
- Rot am See, Germany, since 2002

== See also ==
- Communes of the Isère department
