= Kilstett =

- Commune
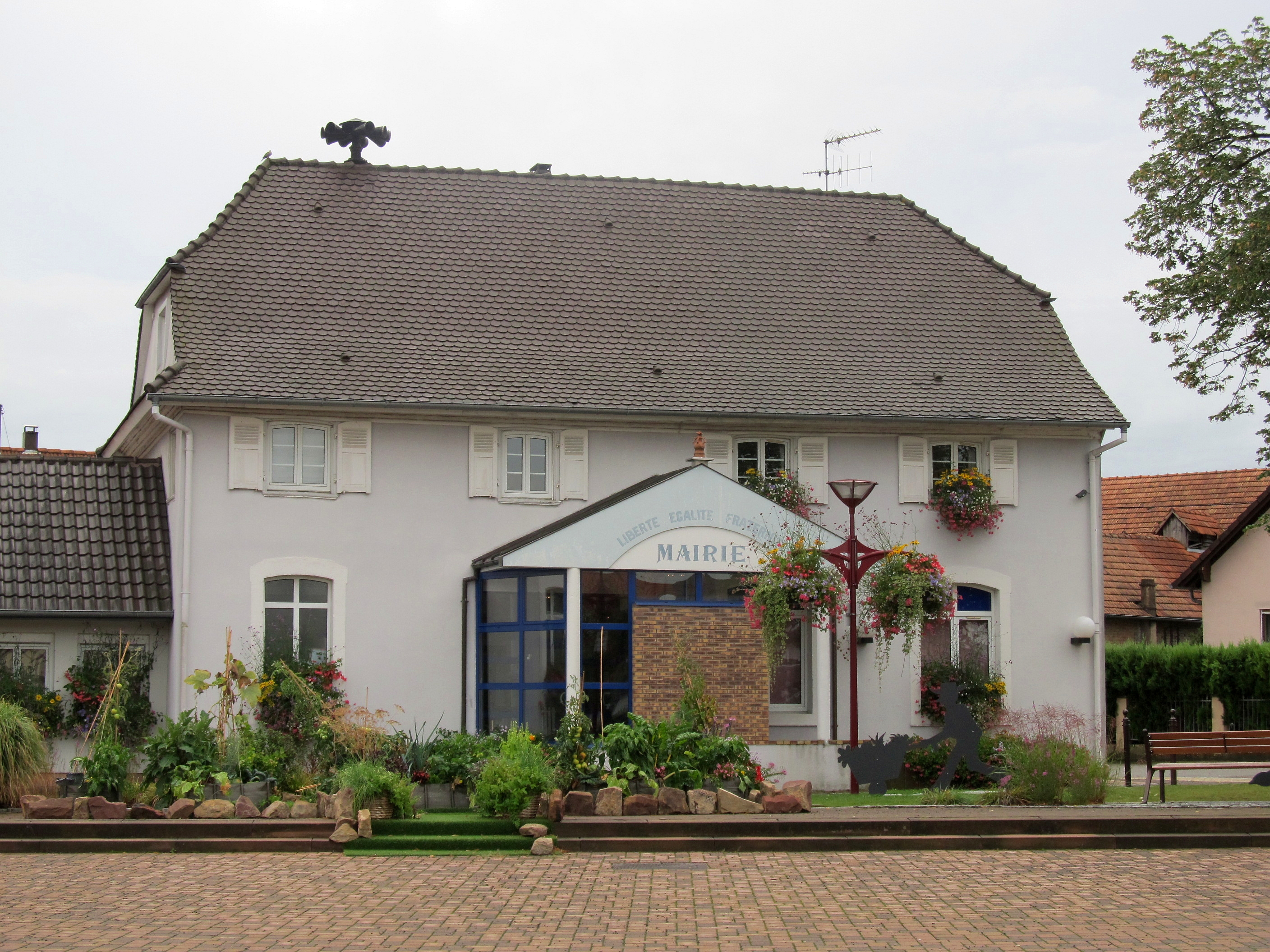
- The town hall in Kilstett

- Coat of arms
- Location of Kilstett
- Location within France Location within Grand Est
- Coordinates: 48°40′35″N 7°51′24″E
- Country: France
- Region: Grand Est
- Department: Bas-Rhin
- Arrondissement: Haguenau-Wissembourg
- Canton: Brumath

Government
  - Mayor (2020–2026): Francis Laas
- Area^{1}: 6.90 km^{2} (2.66 sq mi)
- Highest elevation: 131 m (430 ft)
- Lowest elevation: 126 m (413 ft)
- Population (2023): 2,607
  - Density: 378/km^{2} (979/sq mi)
- Time zone: UTC+01:00 (CET)
  - Summer (DST): UTC+02:00 (CEST)
- INSEE/Postal code: 67237 /67840
- ^{1} French Land Register data, which excludes lakes, ponds, glaciers > 1 km^{2} (0.386 sq mi or 247 acres) and river estuaries.

Kilstett is a commune in the Bas-Rhin department in Grand Est in north-eastern France.

== Geography ==
Kilstett is positioned about fifteen kilometres (nine miles) to the north of Strasbourg.

It has its own stop on the little railway line that connects Strasbourg with the German frontier town of Lauterbourg, and is approximately three kilometres (two miles) to the east of Junction 50 on the Autoroute A35, which is the principal north-south highway in Alsace.

== Population ==
Historical population
| Year | Pop. | ±% p.a. |
|---|---|---|
| 1968 | 1,257 | — |
| 1975 | 1,548 | +3.02% |
| 1982 | 1,510 | −0.35% |
| 1990 | 1,406 | −0.89% |
| 1999 | 1,923 | +3.54% |
| 2007 | 2,320 | +2.37% |
| 2012 | 2,489 | +1.42% |
| 2017 | 2,510 | +0.17% |
| 2023 | 2,607 | +0.63% |
Source: INSEE

Its inhabitants are known as Kilstettois in French.

== Infrastructures and shops ==
Kilstett has a match shop, bakeries, a Crédit Mutuel bank and a pub called A l'Arbre Vert.

== History ==
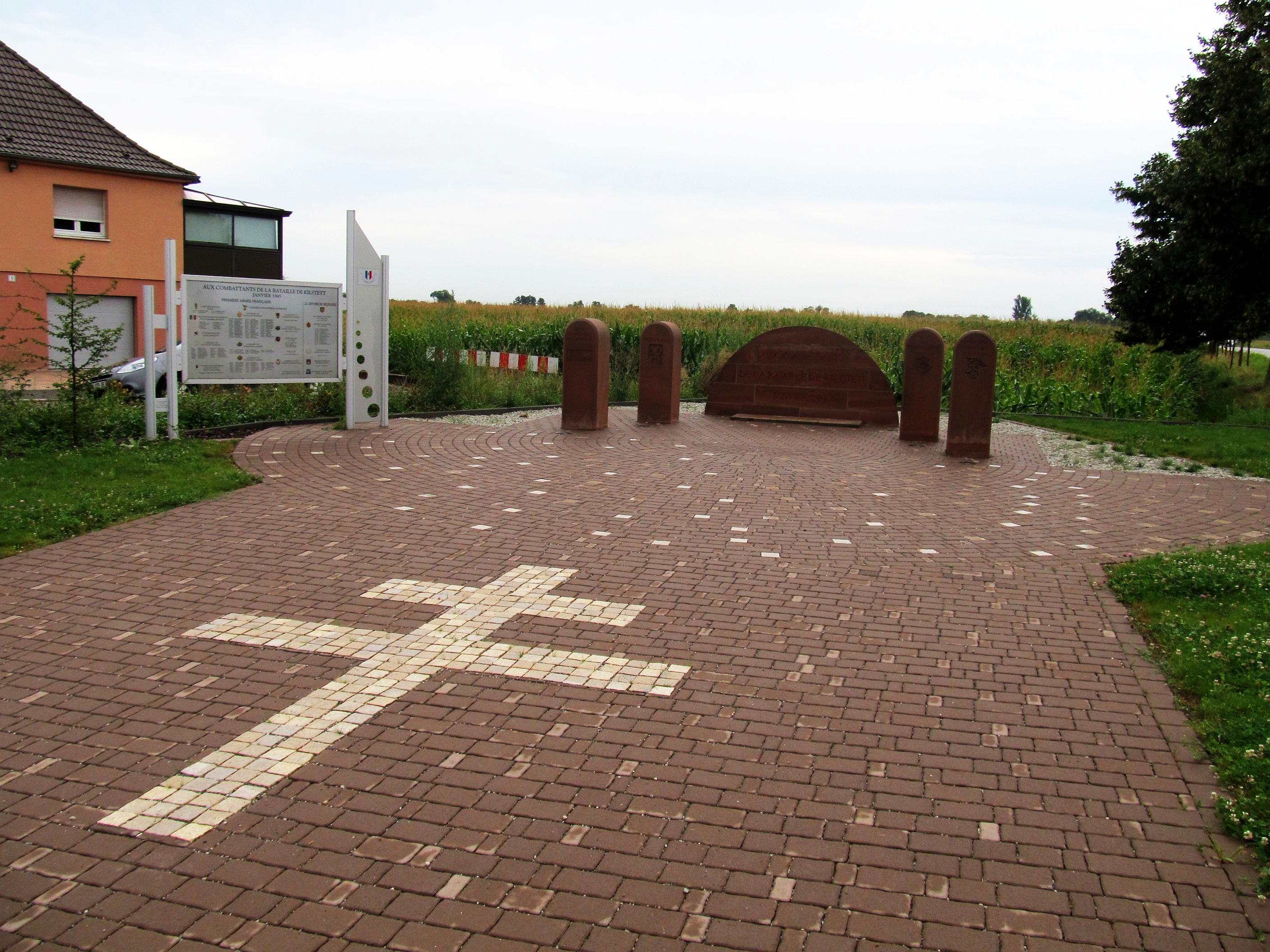
Battle of Kilstett memorial

In January 1945, a German counter-offensive intended to reconquer Strasbourg was stopped at the Battle of Kilstett.

== See also ==
- Communes of the Bas-Rhin department
