= Hœrdt =

Hœrdt Herdt
- Commune
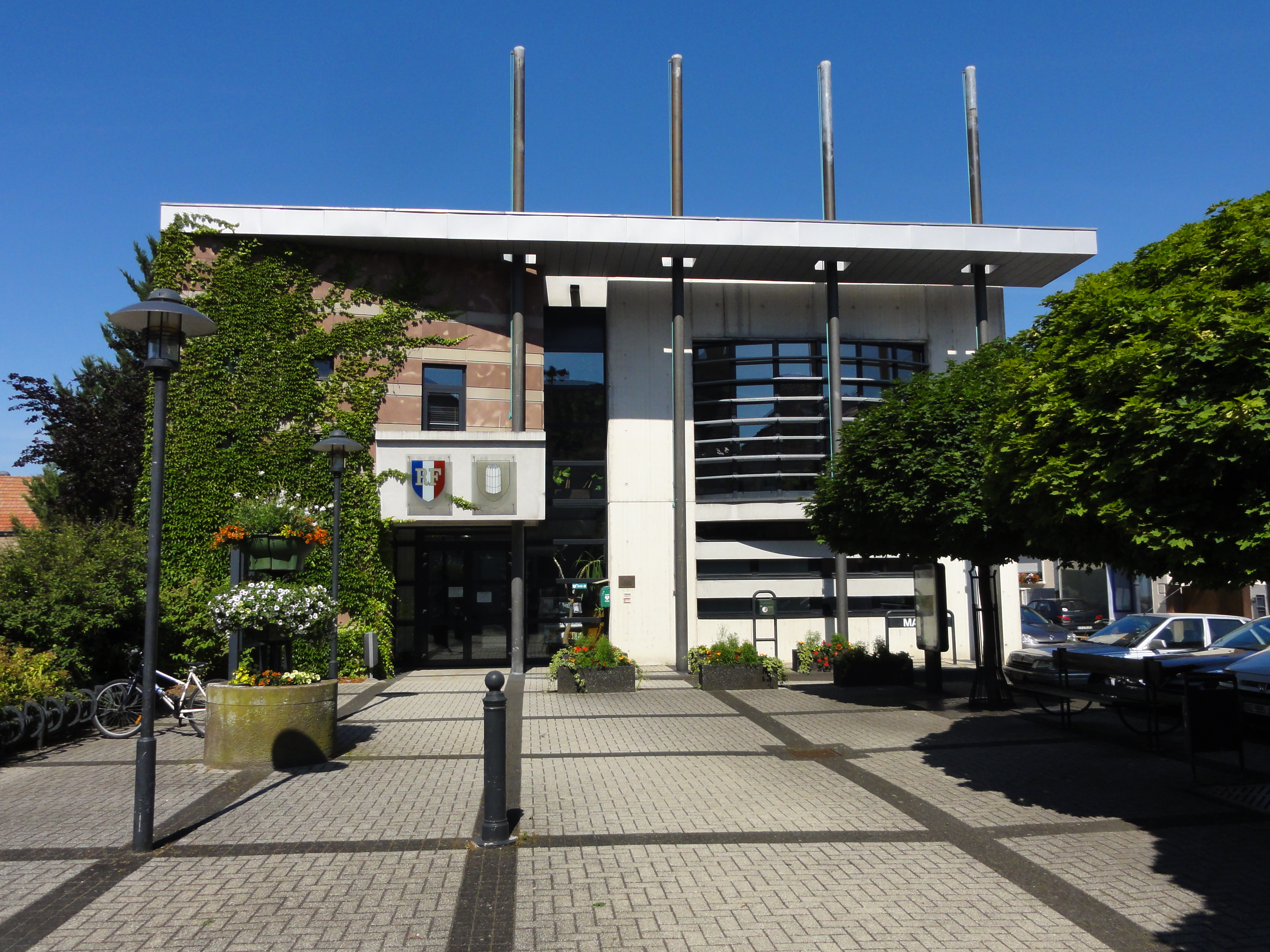
- The town hall in Hœrdt

- Coat of arms
- Location of Hœrdt
- Location within France Location within Grand Est
- Coordinates: 48°41′50″N 7°47′04″E
- Country: France
- Region: Grand Est
- Department: Bas-Rhin
- Arrondissement: Haguenau-Wissembourg
- Canton: Brumath

Government
  - Mayor (2020–2026): Denis Riedinger
- Area^{1}: 16.56 km^{2} (6.39 sq mi)
- Highest elevation: 139 m (456 ft)
- Lowest elevation: 128 m (420 ft)
- Population (2023): 4,570
  - Density: 276/km^{2} (715/sq mi)
- Time zone: UTC+01:00 (CET)
  - Summer (DST): UTC+02:00 (CEST)
- INSEE/Postal code: 67205 /67720
- ^{1} French Land Register data, which excludes lakes, ponds, glaciers > 1 km^{2} (0.386 sq mi or 247 acres) and river estuaries.

Hœrdt (French pronunciation: [œʁt]; German: Hördt) is a commune in the Bas-Rhin department in Grand Est in north-eastern France.

== Geography ==
Hœrdt is positioned between Strasbourg and Haguenau, a short distance to the south-east of Brumath. The commune is traversed by departmental road RD 37 which leads to Bischwiller some ten kilometres (six miles) to the north and from where it is possible to access the Autoroute A35 north-south autoroute connecting Strasbourg with Ludwigshafen (subject to a ten-minute stretch on single carriageway road to the north of the frontier). Hœrdt is also served by a local rail service.

== Population ==
Historical population
Year	Pop.	±% p.a.
1968	3,819	—
1975	3,792	−0.10%
1982	3,699	−0.35%
1990	3,836	+0.46%
1999	4,123	+0.80%
2007	4,429	+0.90%
2012	4,408	−0.10%
2017	4,370	−0.17%
2023	4,570	+0.75%
Source: INSEE

== Economy ==
Agriculture is important to the local economy: the main crop is, famously, asparagus.

== Sport ==
Sports lovers are served by various facilities:

- Strasbourg-Hoerdt Horse racing circuit
- Municipal football stadium and culture centre
- Table tennis: The Hœrdt Table Tennis association, enjoys enthusiastic support locally. It is affiliated to the FFTT (French Table Tennis federation).

== See also ==
- Communes of the Bas-Rhin department
