= Musée archéologique (Brumath) =

Archaeological museum in France

The Musée archéologique is an archaeological museum in Brumath in the Bas-Rhin department of France. It displays findings of prehistoric, Celtic and Roman origin made in and around this very old city.

The museum's opening hours, only a few hours a year since at least the early 1970s, have drawn criticism in the regional archeology press.
