= Rottelsheim =

Rottelsheim Rottelse
- Commune
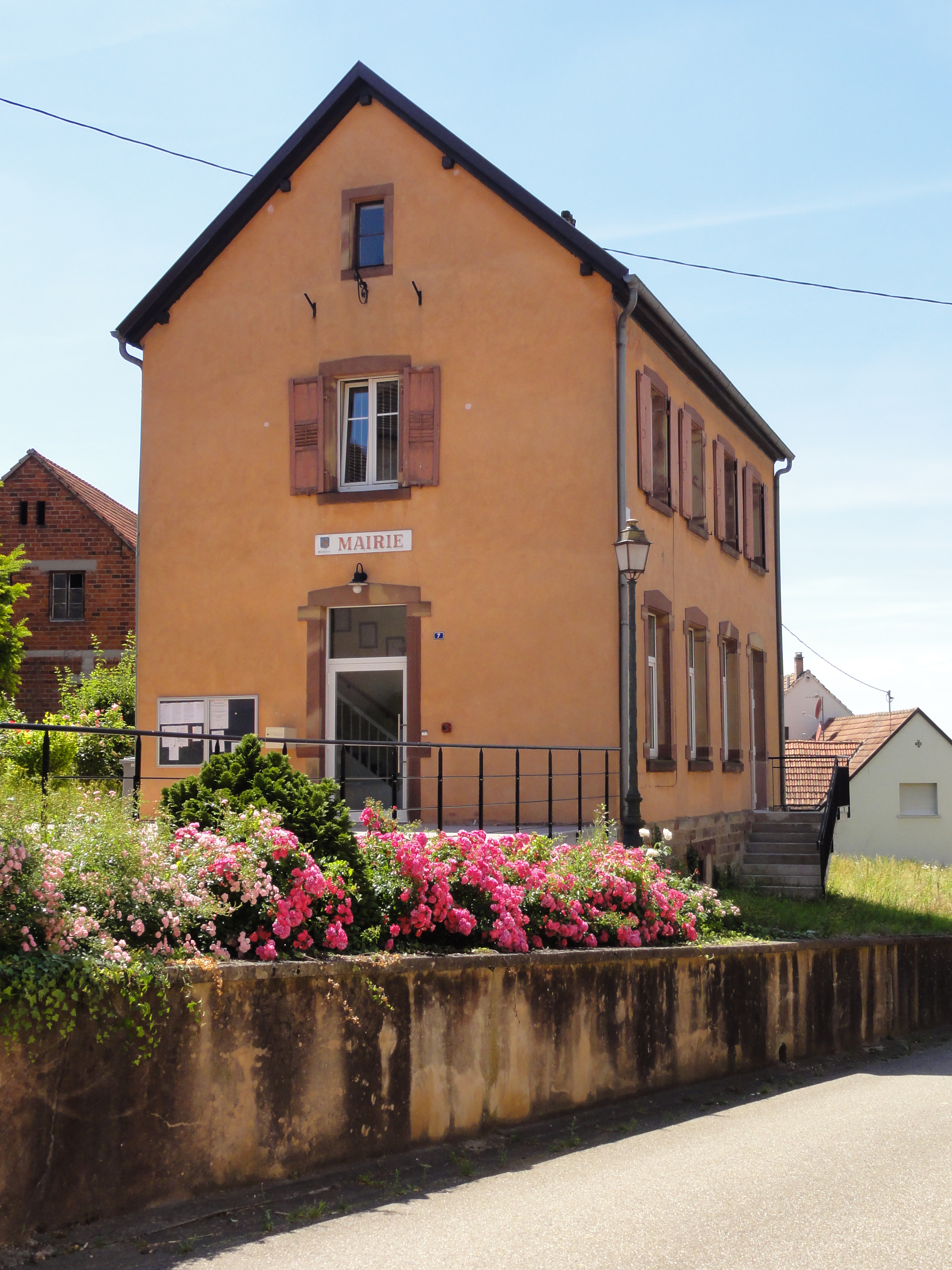
- The town hall in Rottelsheim

- Coat of arms
- Location of Rottelsheim
- Location within France Location within Grand Est
- Coordinates: 48°45′25″N 7°42′55″E
- Country: France
- Region: Grand Est
- Department: Bas-Rhin
- Arrondissement: Haguenau-Wissembourg
- Canton: Brumath
- Intercommunality: CA Haguenau

Government
  - Mayor (2020–2026): Clément Metz
- Area^{1}: 2.39 km^{2} (0.92 sq mi)
- Highest elevation: 196 m (643 ft)
- Lowest elevation: 161 m (528 ft)
- Population (2023): 301
  - Density: 126/km^{2} (326/sq mi)
- Time zone: UTC+01:00 (CET)
  - Summer (DST): UTC+02:00 (CEST)
- INSEE/Postal code: 67417 /67170
- ^{1} French Land Register data, which excludes lakes, ponds, glaciers > 1 km^{2} (0.386 sq mi or 247 acres) and river estuaries.

Rottelsheim is a commune in the Bas-Rhin department and Grand Est region of north-eastern France.

== See also ==
- Communes of the Bas-Rhin department
