= Kurtzenhouse =

Kurtzenhouse Kurzehüse
- Commune
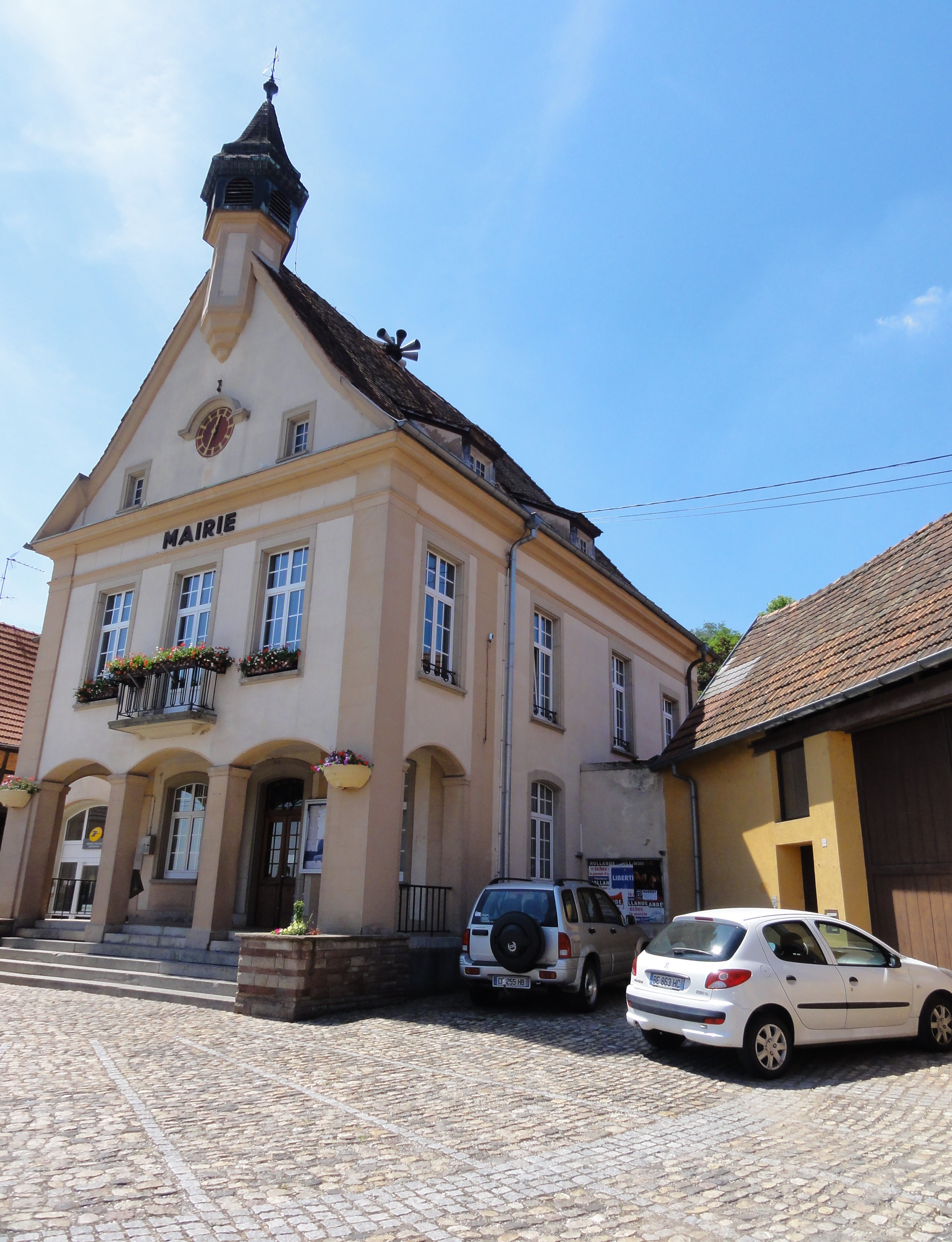
- The town hall in Kurtzenhouse

- Coat of arms
- Location of Kurtzenhouse
- Location within France Location within Grand Est
- Coordinates: 48°44′27″N 7°48′28″E
- Country: France
- Region: Grand Est
- Department: Bas-Rhin
- Arrondissement: Haguenau-Wissembourg
- Canton: Brumath

Government
  - Mayor (2020–2026): Marc Moser
- Area^{1}: 3.58 km^{2} (1.38 sq mi)
- Highest elevation: 179 m (587 ft)
- Lowest elevation: 126 m (413 ft)
- Population (2023): 1,093
  - Density: 305/km^{2} (791/sq mi)
- Time zone: UTC+01:00 (CET)
  - Summer (DST): UTC+02:00 (CEST)
- INSEE/Postal code: 67252 /67240
- ^{1} French Land Register data, which excludes lakes, ponds, glaciers > 1 km^{2} (0.386 sq mi or 247 acres) and river estuaries.

Kurtzenhouse (German: Kurzenhausen) is a commune in the Bas-Rhin department in Grand Est in north-eastern France.

The name of the commune was officially changed from Kurtzenhausen to Kurtzenhouse in January 1955.

== Geography ==
The village is positioned about ten kilometres (six miles) south of Haguenau: the surrounding countryside is largely taken up with agriculture. Through the south-eastern side of the commune runs the departmental road RD 37, and beside that the rather indirect railway line that connects Haguenau with Strasbourg to the south.

== See also ==
- Communes of the Bas-Rhin department
