= Bietlenheim =

Bietlenheim Bietle
- Commune
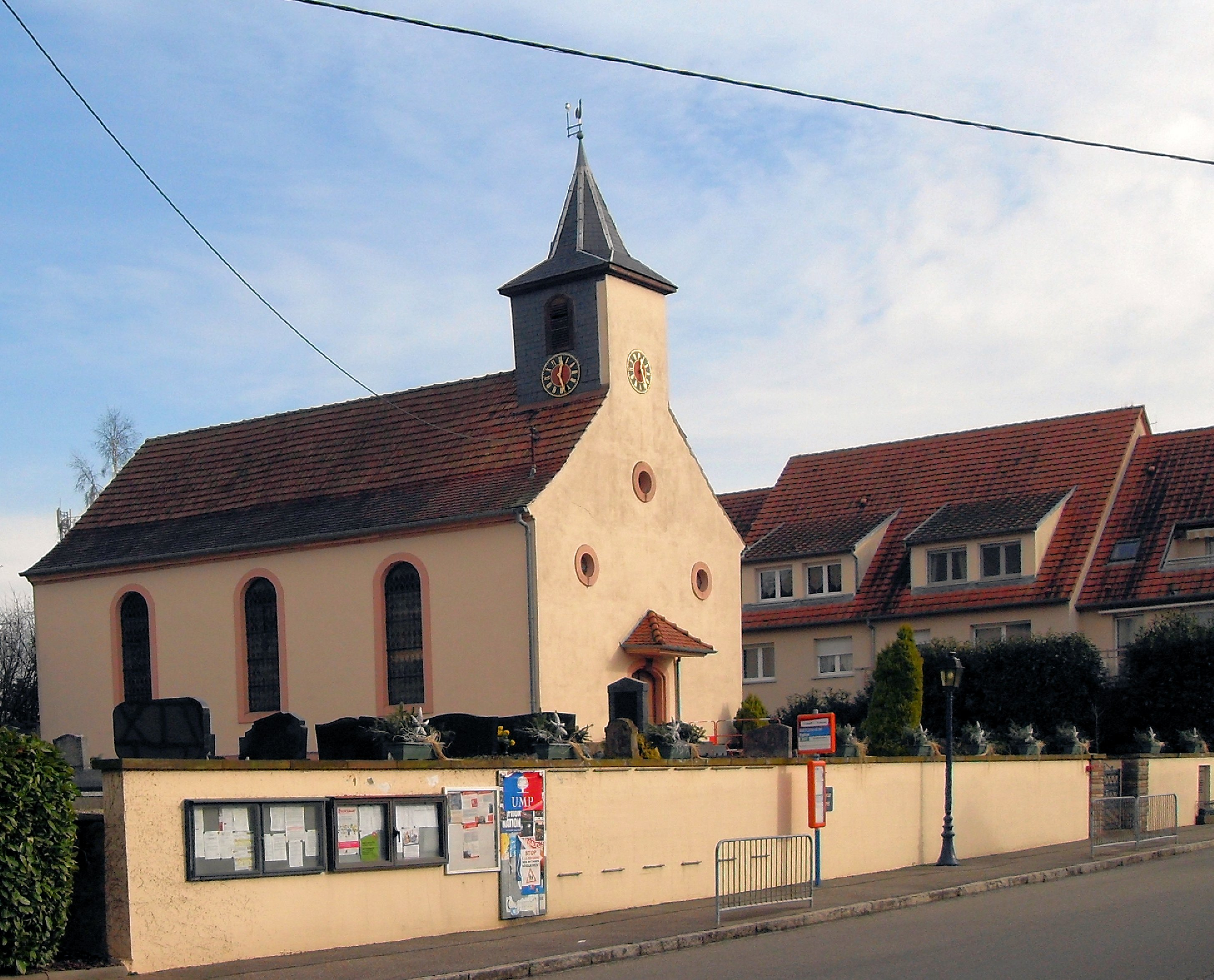
- The Protestant church in Bietlenheim

- Coat of arms
- Location of Bietlenheim
- Location within France Location within Grand Est
- Coordinates: 48°43′11″N 7°46′56″E
- Country: France
- Region: Grand Est
- Department: Bas-Rhin
- Arrondissement: Haguenau-Wissembourg
- Canton: Brumath

Government
  - Mayor (2020–2026): Patrick Kieffer
- Area^{1}: 2.13 km^{2} (0.82 sq mi)
- Highest elevation: 168 m (551 ft)
- Lowest elevation: 133 m (436 ft)
- Population (2023): 314
  - Density: 147/km^{2} (382/sq mi)
- Time zone: UTC+01:00 (CET)
  - Summer (DST): UTC+02:00 (CEST)
- INSEE/Postal code: 67038 /67720
- ^{1} French Land Register data, which excludes lakes, ponds, glaciers > 1 km^{2} (0.386 sq mi or 247 acres) and river estuaries.

Bietlenheim (French pronunciation: [bitlənaim]) is a commune in the Bas-Rhin department in Grand Est in northeastern France.

== Population ==
Historical population
Year	Pop.	±% p.a.
1968	155	—
1975	182	+2.32%
1982	208	+1.93%
1990	260	+2.83%
1999	279	+0.79%
2007	272	−0.32%
2012	285	+0.94%
2017	277	−0.57%
2023	314	+2.11%
Source: INSEE

== See also ==
- Communes of the Bas-Rhin department
