= Weitbruch =

- Commune
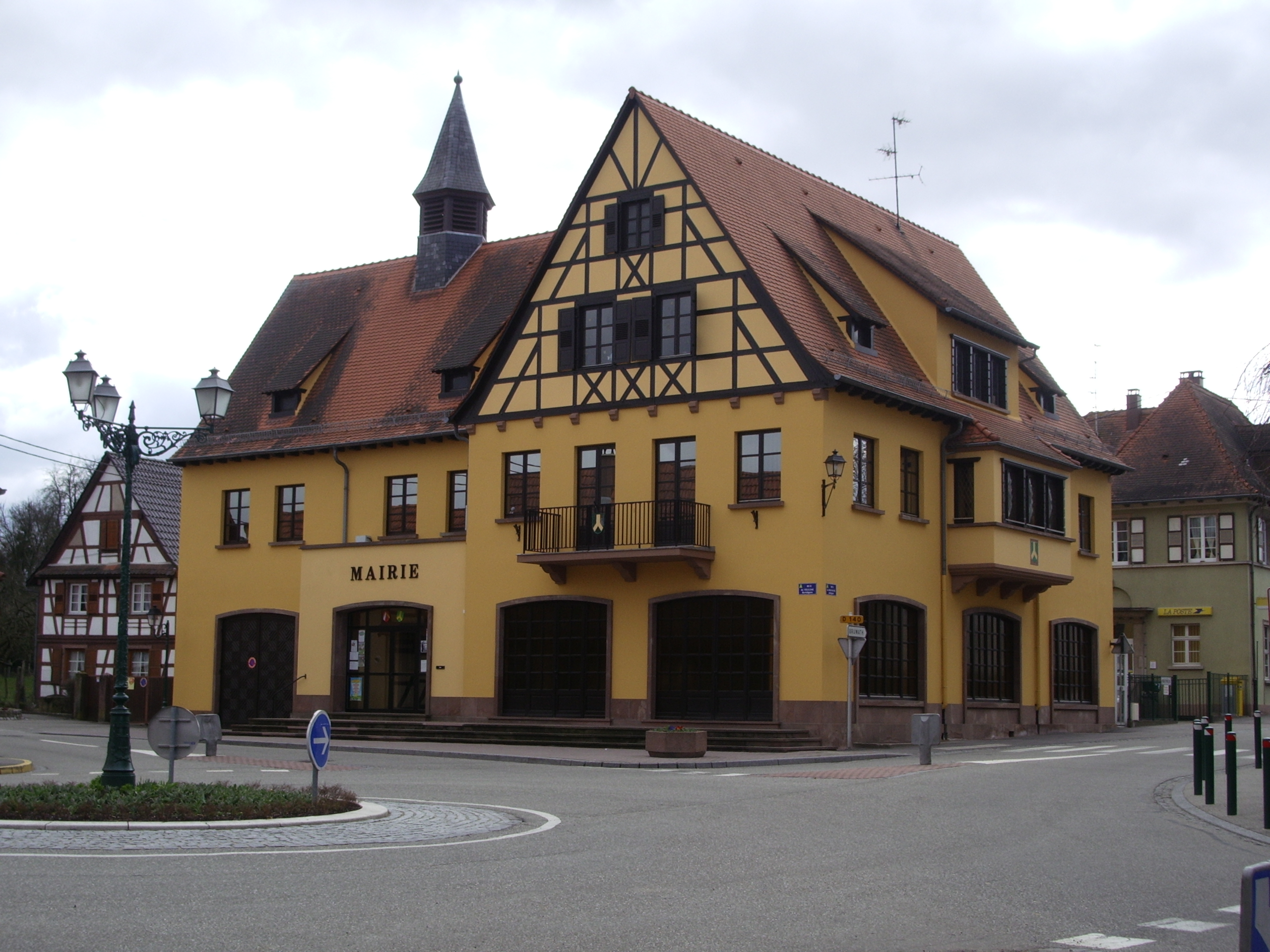
- The town hall in Weitbruch

- Coat of arms
- Location of Weitbruch
- Location within France Location within Grand Est
- Coordinates: 48°45′25″N 7°46′43″E
- Country: France
- Region: Grand Est
- Department: Bas-Rhin
- Arrondissement: Haguenau-Wissembourg
- Canton: Brumath
- Intercommunality: CC Basse-Zorn

Government
  - Mayor (2020–2026): Damien Henrion
- Area^{1}: 15.11 km^{2} (5.83 sq mi)
- Highest elevation: 187 m (614 ft)
- Lowest elevation: 143 m (469 ft)
- Population (2023): 2,711
  - Density: 179.4/km^{2} (464.7/sq mi)
- Time zone: UTC+01:00 (CET)
  - Summer (DST): UTC+02:00 (CEST)
- INSEE/Postal code: 67523 /67500
- ^{1} French Land Register data, which excludes lakes, ponds, glaciers > 1 km^{2} (0.386 sq mi or 247 acres) and river estuaries.

Weitbruch is a commune in the Bas-Rhin department and Grand Est region of north-eastern France.

== Population ==
Historical population

Year	Pop.	±% p.a.
1793	815	—
1821	1,113	+1.12%
1846	1,557	+1.35%
1871	1,744	+0.45%
1900	1,778	+0.07%
1926	1,704	−0.16%
1946	1,730	+0.08%
1962	1,725	−0.02%
1968	1,909	+1.70%

Year	Pop.	±% p.a.
1975	2,083	+1.25%
1982	2,264	+1.20%
1990	2,323	+0.32%
1999	2,473	+0.70%
2007	2,661	+0.92%
2012	2,730	+0.51%
2017	2,832	+0.74%
2023	2,711	−0.73%

Source: EHESS and INSEE (1968-2023)

== See also ==
- Communes of the Bas-Rhin department
