= Brumath =

- Commune
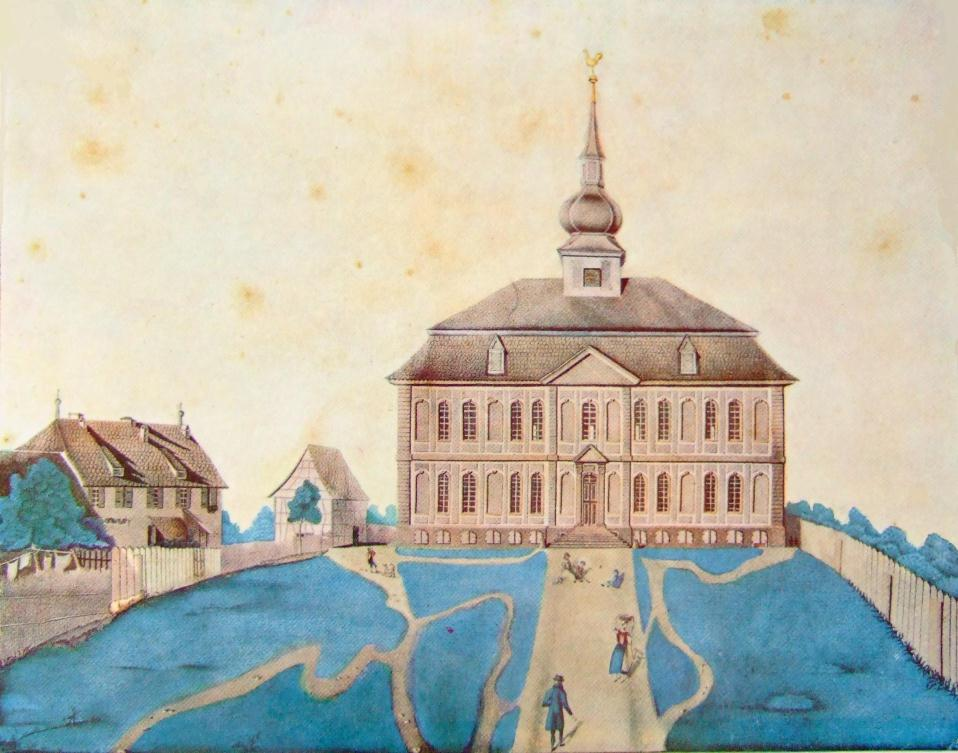
- Chateau de Brumath, 1818

- Coat of arms
- Location of Brumath
- Location within France Location within Grand Est
- Coordinates: 48°43′58″N 7°42′33″E
- Country: France
- Region: Grand Est
- Department: Bas-Rhin
- Arrondissement: Haguenau-Wissembourg
- Canton: Brumath
- Intercommunality: CA Haguenau

Government
  - Mayor (2020–2026): Etienne Wolf
- Area^{1}: 29.54 km^{2} (11.41 sq mi)
- Highest elevation: 189 m (620 ft)
- Lowest elevation: 136 m (446 ft)
- Population (2023): 10,499
  - Density: 355.4/km^{2} (920.5/sq mi)
- Time zone: UTC+01:00 (CET)
  - Summer (DST): UTC+02:00 (CEST)
- INSEE/Postal code: 67067 /67170
- ^{1} French Land Register data, which excludes lakes, ponds, glaciers > 1 km^{2} (0.386 sq mi or 247 acres) and river estuaries.

Brumath (French pronunciation: [bʁymat]; Alsatian: Bröömt) is a commune in the Bas-Rhin department in Grand Est in north-eastern France.

== History ==
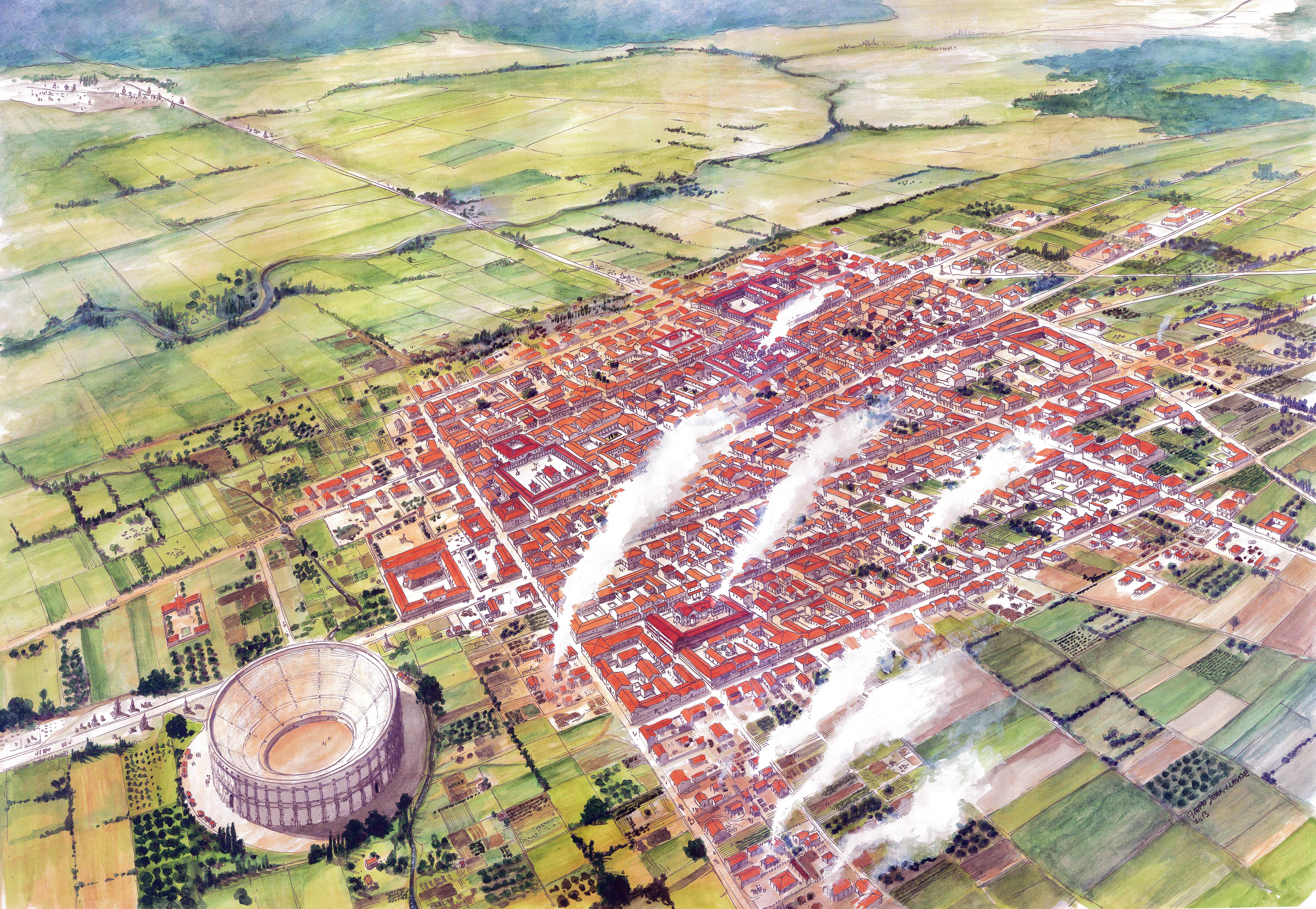
Brocomagus in the 2nd century

Brumath occupies the site of the Roman Brocomagus. Maria Christina of Saxony, aunt of Louis XVI, died in the château in the city. The building was partly demolished in the Revolution.

== Geography ==
Brumath is located on the Zorn river, and is 17 km (11 mi) north of Strasbourg and 13 km (8.1 mi) south of Haguenau.

== Population ==
Historical population
Year	Pop.	±% p.a.
1968	7,357	—
1975	6,888	−0.94%
1982	7,702	+1.61%
1990	8,182	+0.76%
1999	8,930	+0.98%
2007	9,825	+1.20%
2012	10,072	+0.50%
2017	9,986	−0.17%
2023	10,499	+0.84%
Source: INSEE

== Landmarks ==
Brumath has a Roman Catholic and a Protestant church. The Protestant church is housed in the former castle of the Hanau-Lichtenberg family since 1804. The vaulted basement of the castle also houses the Musée archéologique, displaying findings made in and around the ancient Roman town of Brocomagus.

== Transportation ==
Brumath is served by the Route nationale 63, linking Strasbourg to Haguenau, and by the A4 autoroute. It has a railway station on the line linking Strasbourg and Metz.

== Notable people ==
- George Brumder's ancestry is from Brumath as is the origin of his surname.
- Maria Christina of Saxony died in Brumath.
- The great-great-grandmother of J. K. Rowling, Salomé Schuch, lived in Brumath.

== See also ==
- Battle of Brumath
- Bernard Schreiner (1937-2020), French politician born in Brumath
- Communes of the Bas-Rhin department
