= Grendelbruch =

Grendelbruch Grandelbrüech
- Commune
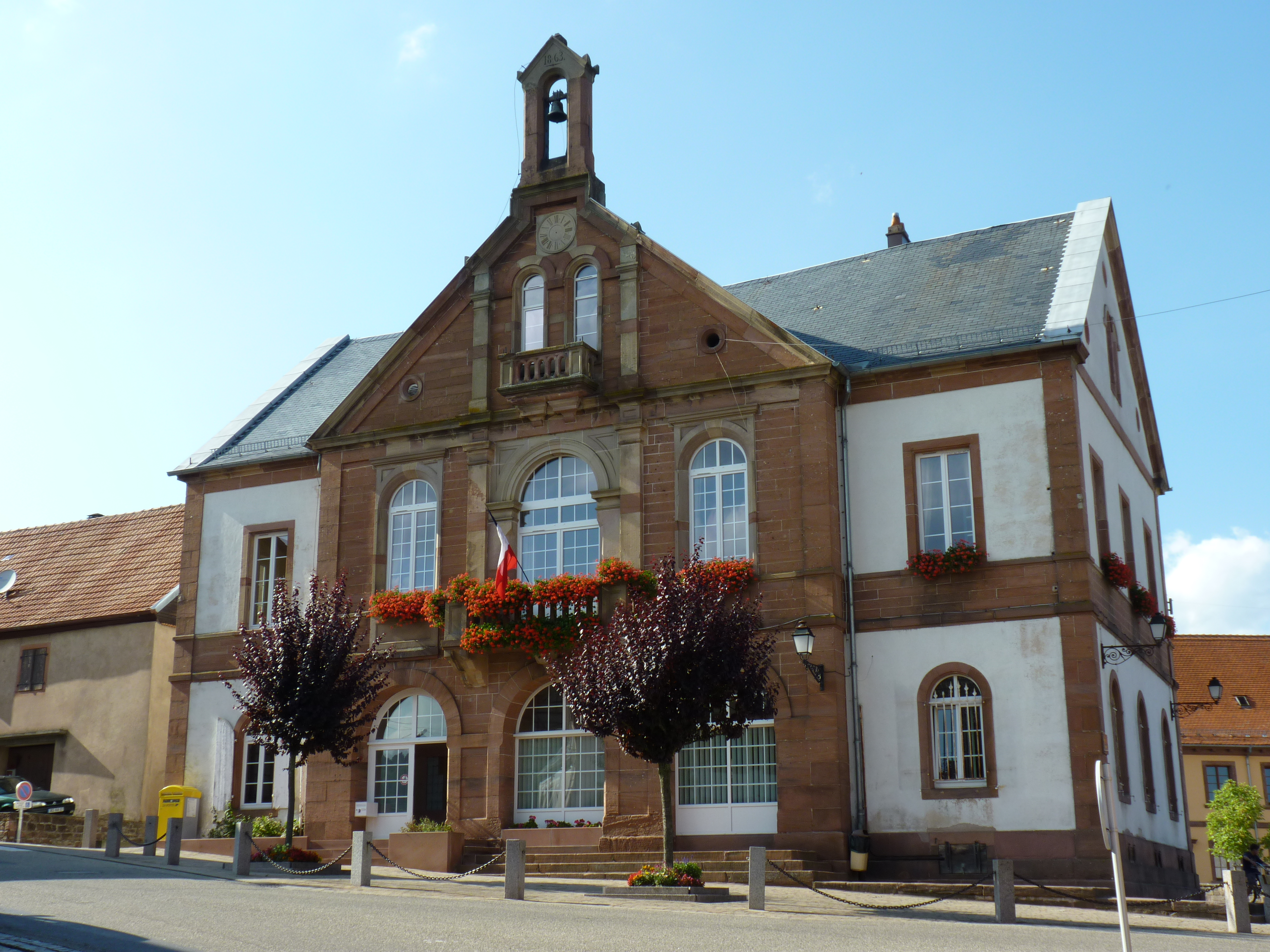
- The town hall in Grendelbruch

- Coat of arms
- Location of Grendelbruch
- Location within France Location within Grand Est
- Coordinates: 48°29′35″N 7°19′24″E
- Country: France
- Region: Grand Est
- Department: Bas-Rhin
- Arrondissement: Molsheim
- Canton: Molsheim

Government
  - Mayor (2020–2026): Jean-Philippe Kaes
- Area^{1}: 14.63 km^{2} (5.65 sq mi)
- Highest elevation: 1,031 m (3,383 ft)
- Lowest elevation: 399 m (1,309 ft)
- Population (2023): 1,195
  - Density: 81.68/km^{2} (211.6/sq mi)
- Time zone: UTC+01:00 (CET)
  - Summer (DST): UTC+02:00 (CEST)
- INSEE/Postal code: 67167 /67190
- ^{1} French Land Register data, which excludes lakes, ponds, glaciers > 1 km^{2} (0.386 sq mi or 247 acres) and river estuaries.

Grendelbruch (French pronunciation: [gʁɛndəlbʁyʃ] or [gʁɛndəlbʁux]) is a commune in the Bas-Rhin department in Grand Est in north-eastern France.

== Geography ==
Grendelbruch is a mountain village set in the forested region to the west of Obernai.

=== Surrounding communes ===
- Bœrsch, Mollkirch, Rosheim, Muhlbach-sur-Bruche, Barembach, Natzwiller and Russ.

== History ==
The first surviving written mention of Grendelbruch appears in a papal bull dated November 28, 1049, wherein the pope confirms that the Abbey of Altdorf may receive the tithes from "Grundelbac". Bac is an old Germanic word for a brook (Modern German: Bach), and Grendelbruch is one of a number of place names formed between the fifth and eighth centuries (when Germanic dialects predominated in the region) ending in a form of this word.

Grendelbruch was liberated from German occupation on November 26, 1944 by the Second Battalion of the Thirtieth Infantry Regiment of the US Army. Under the command of Lt Col Frederick R Armstrong the battalion engaged in fierce house to house fighting through the night. Significant further fighting took place in the forest surrounding the village.

== See also ==
- Communes of the Bas-Rhin department
