= Kirchheim, Bas-Rhin =

Kirchheim Keriche
- Commune
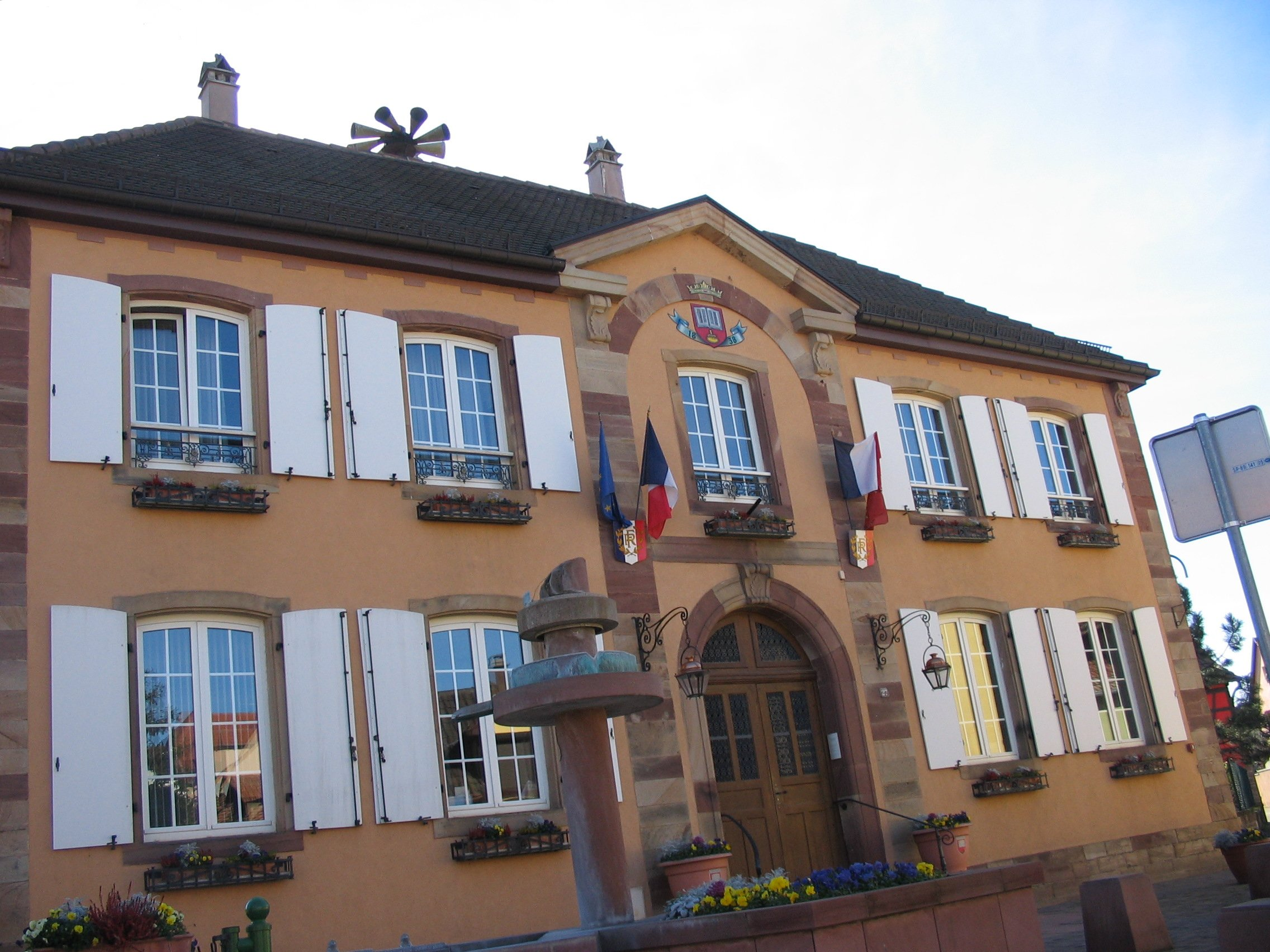
- The town hall in Kirchheim

- Coat of arms
- Location of Kirchheim
- Location within France Location within Grand Est
- Coordinates: 48°36′37″N 7°29′48″E
- Country: France
- Region: Grand Est
- Department: Bas-Rhin
- Arrondissement: Molsheim
- Canton: Molsheim
- Intercommunality: CC de la Mossig et du Vignoble

Government
  - Mayor (2020–2026): Patrick Deck
- Area^{1}: 2.30 km^{2} (0.89 sq mi)
- Highest elevation: 237 m (778 ft)
- Lowest elevation: 175 m (574 ft)
- Population (2023): 692
  - Density: 301/km^{2} (779/sq mi)
- Time zone: UTC+01:00 (CET)
  - Summer (DST): UTC+02:00 (CEST)
- INSEE/Postal code: 67240 /67520
- ^{1} French Land Register data, which excludes lakes, ponds, glaciers > 1 km^{2} (0.386 sq mi or 247 acres) and river estuaries.

Kirchheim (French pronunciation: [kiʁʃaim]; Alsatian: Keriche) is a commune in the Bas-Rhin department and Grand Est region of northeastern France.

== Geography ==
Kirchheim lies on the western edge of the Alsace plain where it meets the first foothills of the Vosges Mountains, 19 km west of Strasbourg, 18 km southeast of Saverne, and 8 km north of Molsheim. Adjacent communes are Marlenheim to the north, Odratzheim and Scharrachbergheim-Irmstett to the south, and Wangen to the northwest.

The village is within easy walking distance of the main road connecting Saverne to Strasbourg. The former railway line from Molsheim has been developed into a cycle path traversing the commune. Bus services link Kirchheim to Strasbourg (route 207) and Molsheim (route 212), both starting from Wasselonne, a short distance to the northwest.

The commune's eastern boundary is provided by the small River Mossig, a tributary of the Bruche, flowing from north to south. The ecosystem includes a riparian zone which provides a biological corridor for wildlife. Resident species include the endangered Great Hamster of Alsace.

Most of the surrounding land is either ploughland or laid to grass, although there are vineyards to the southeast and, to a limited extent, the northwest.

== Economy ==
A packaging company provides two-thirds of the jobs in the village. Several other firms provide a relatively small number of jobs. In the early twenty-first century, there were 80 employed positions in the commune.

The agricultural sector, currently dominated by maize cultivation, is also significant in the village economy. There are virtually no shops, but basic shopping is available from travelling van-based businesses.

== History ==
Local discoveries of Roman relics suggest the presence of a settlement in the Roman period. An early surviving reference from the seventh century gives the name of the village as Chirichheim. There is also evidence of a royal residence frequently used by Charles the Fat and the Empress Richarde in the later Merovingian period.

The village was part of the territory of the Empire, and was a dependency of nearby Wasselonne with which, according to records of the time, Kirchheim shared its history until it came under the control of Strasbourg. The Convent of Haslach held a cour domaniale (regional court) there and retained certain rights. There is evidence of some sort of religious monastery or convent in the eleventh century, which later, in 1274, was taken under the protection of Rudolf I of Germany.

The village's coat of arms features an open book and an ink pad—an indication, it is believed, of the presence of several printing firms in the fifteenth and sixteenth centuries.

Kirchheim came under the ecclesiastical administration of the chapter of Molsheim. Kirchheim Church was, in turn, the mother church of those at Marlenheim and Odratzheim, an arrangement that continued until the start of the nineteenth century.

== See also ==
- Communes of the Bas-Rhin department
