= Bischoffsheim =

Bischoffsheim Bìsche
- Commune
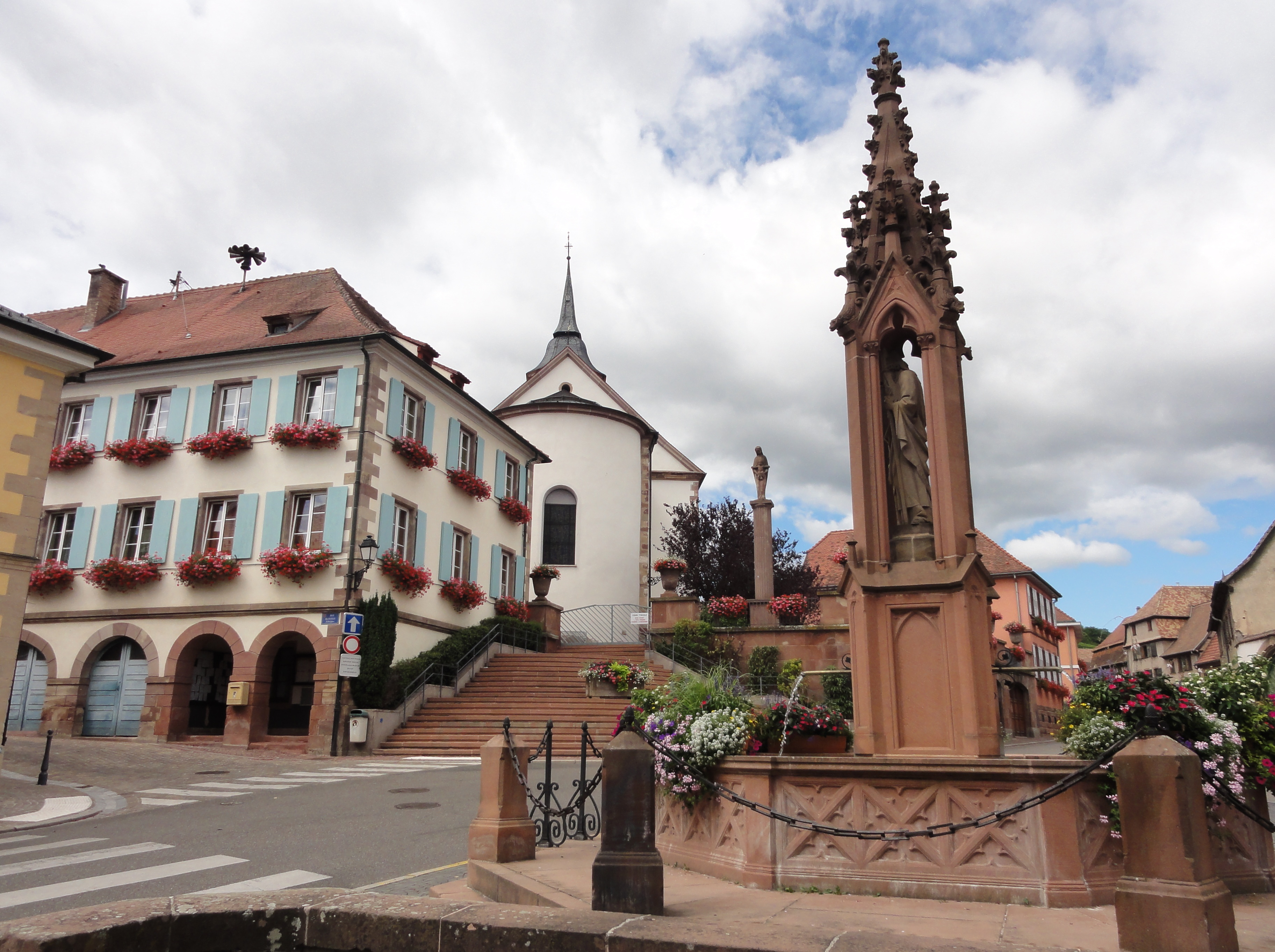
- The fountain and surroundings in Bischoffsheim

- Coat of arms
- Location of Bischoffsheim
- Location within France Location within Grand Est
- Coordinates: 48°29′16″N 7°29′25″E
- Country: France
- Region: Grand Est
- Department: Bas-Rhin
- Arrondissement: Molsheim
- Canton: Molsheim

Government
  - Mayor (2020–2026): Claude Lutz
- Area^{1}: 12.33 km^{2} (4.76 sq mi)
- Highest elevation: 362 m (1,188 ft)
- Lowest elevation: 149 m (489 ft)
- Population (2023): 3,342
  - Density: 271.0/km^{2} (702.0/sq mi)
- Time zone: UTC+01:00 (CET)
  - Summer (DST): UTC+02:00 (CEST)
- INSEE/Postal code: 67045 /67870
- ^{1} French Land Register data, which excludes lakes, ponds, glaciers > 1 km^{2} (0.386 sq mi or 247 acres) and river estuaries.

Bischoffsheim (French pronunciation: [biʃɔfsaim]; German: Bischofsheim im Elsass; Alsatian: Bìsche) is a commune in the Bas-Rhin department in Grand Est in northeastern France.

== Neighboring communes ==
- Bœrsch
- Griesheim-près-Molsheim
- Rosheim
- Krautergersheim
- Obernai
- Innenheim
- Blaesheim

== History ==
Archaeological discoveries attest to the presence of people in the site of Bischoffsheim since the Neolithic, five to six thousand years BCE. Various remains indicate that the site was already important before the Roman period.

== Population ==
Historical population
| Year | Pop. | ±% p.a. |
|---|---|---|
| 1968 | 1,495 | — |
| 1975 | 1,819 | +2.84% |
| 1982 | 2,075 | +1.90% |
| 1990 | 2,176 | +0.60% |
| 1999 | 2,768 | +2.71% |
| 2007 | 3,141 | +1.59% |
| 2012 | 3,322 | +1.13% |
| 2017 | 3,330 | +0.05% |
| 2023 | 3,342 | +0.06% |
Source: INSEE

== See also ==
- Communes of the Bas-Rhin department
