= Altorf =

Altorf Àldorf
- Commune
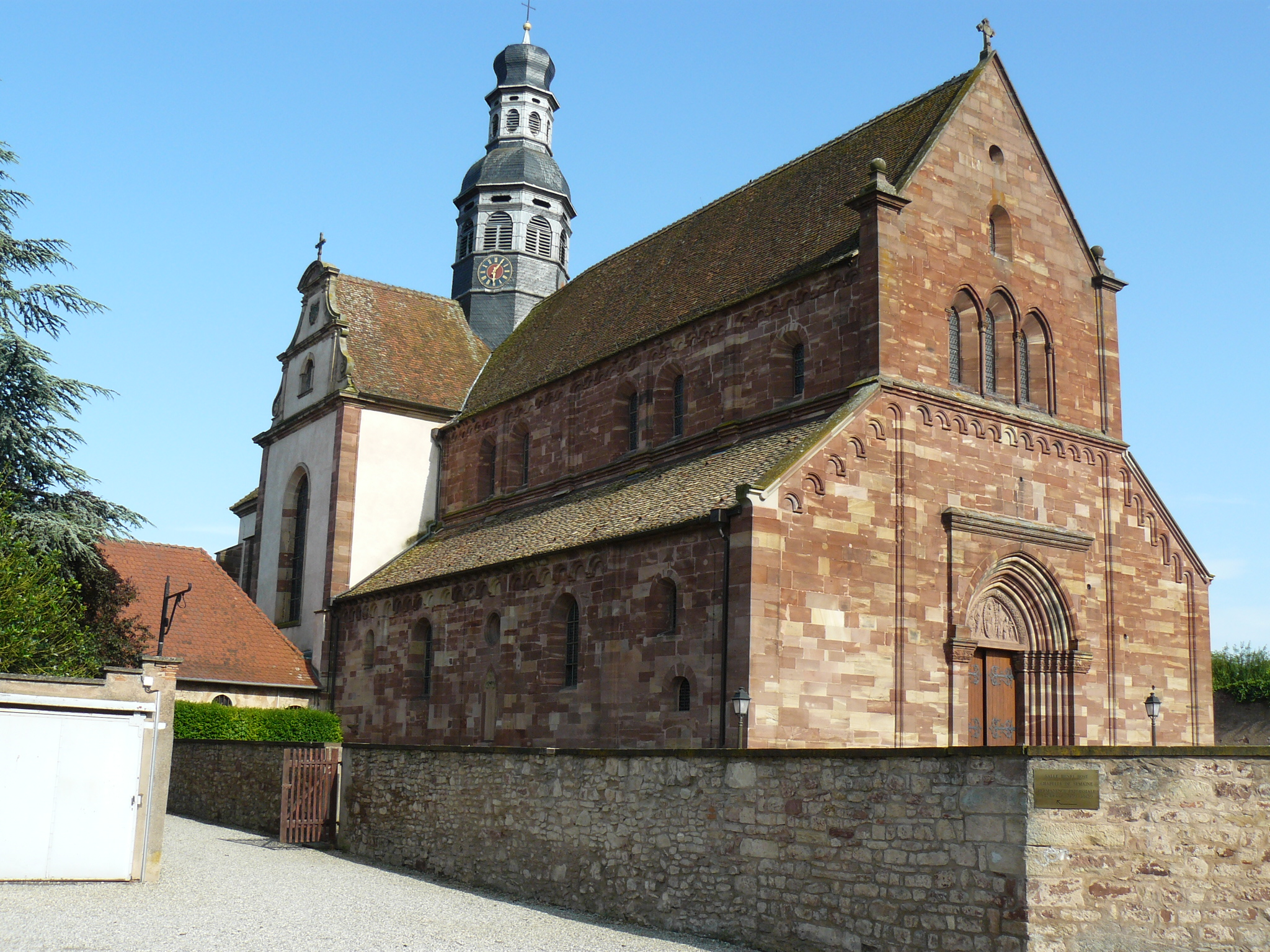
- The church in Altorf

- Coat of arms
- Location of Altorf
- Location within France Location within Grand Est
- Coordinates: 48°31′23″N 7°31′45″E
- Country: France
- Region: Grand Est
- Department: Bas-Rhin
- Arrondissement: Molsheim
- Canton: Molsheim

Government
  - Mayor (2020–2026): Bruno Eyder
- Area^{1}: 10.19 km^{2} (3.93 sq mi)
- Highest elevation: 186 m (610 ft)
- Lowest elevation: 162 m (531 ft)
- Population (2023): 1,447
  - Density: 142.0/km^{2} (367.8/sq mi)
- Time zone: UTC+01:00 (CET)
  - Summer (DST): UTC+02:00 (CEST)
- INSEE/Postal code: 67008 /67120
- ^{1} French Land Register data, which excludes lakes, ponds, glaciers > 1 km^{2} (0.386 sq mi or 247 acres) and river estuaries.

Altorf (French pronunciation: [altɔʁf]; German: Altdorf; Alsatian: Àldorf) is a commune in the Bas-Rhin department in the Grand Est region of northeastern France.

The commune has been awarded one flower by the National Council of Towns and Villages in Bloom in the Competition of cities and villages in Bloom.

== Geography ==
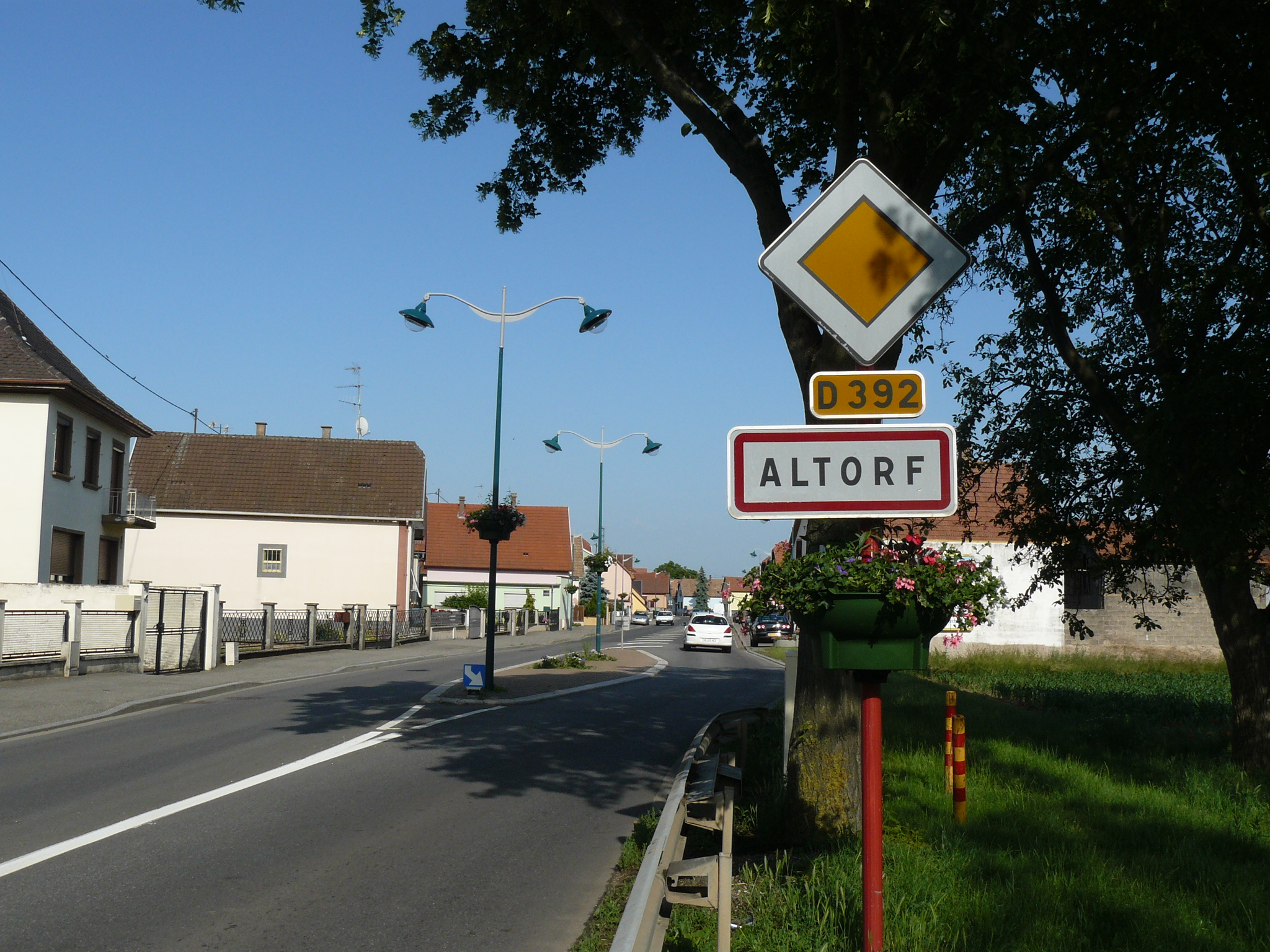
Entrance to the village of Altorf

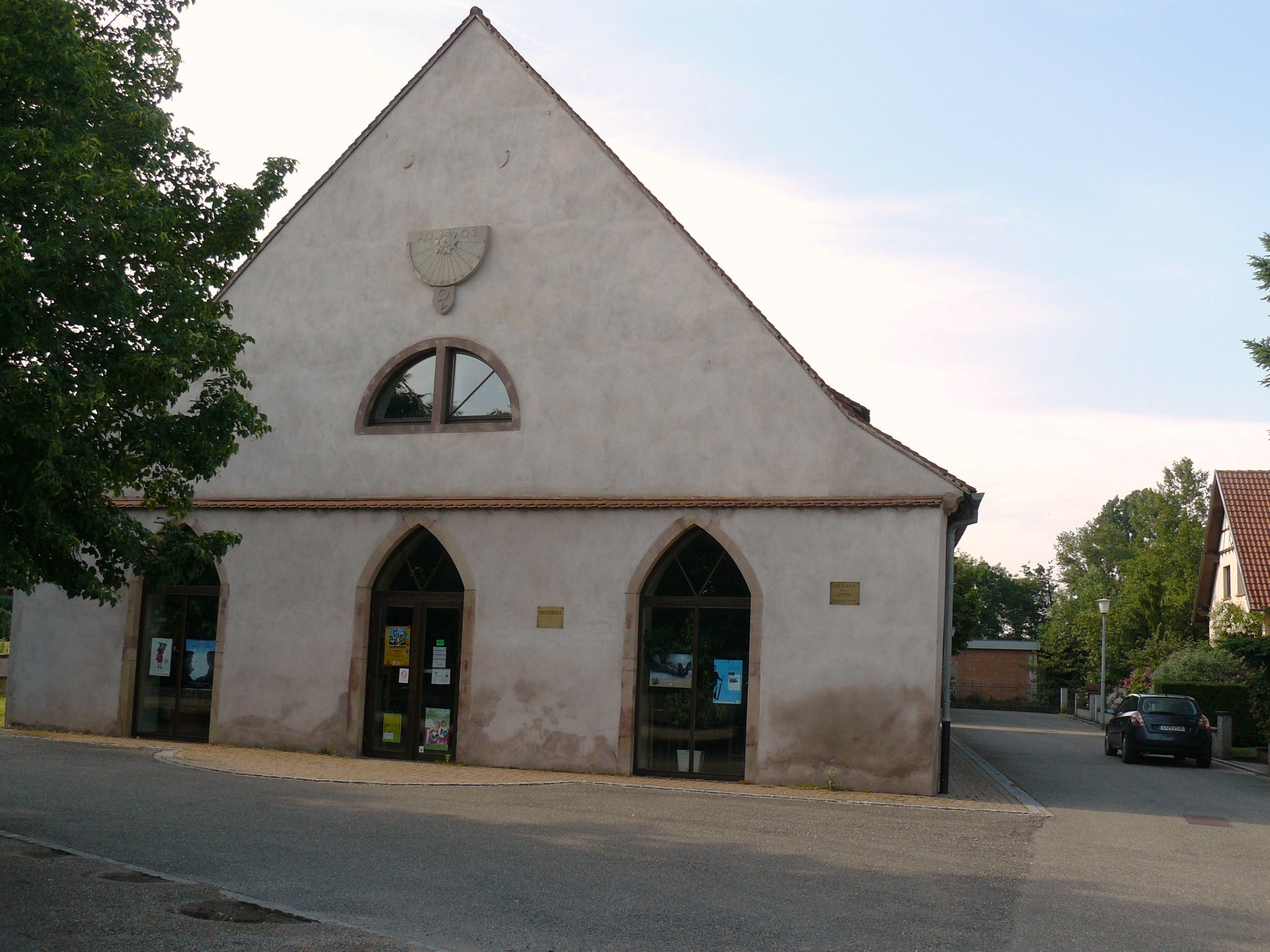
Former tithe barn converted into a library

A part of the Canton of Molsheim and also its arrondissement, Altorf is located about 15 kilometres west of Strasbourg. The A352 National Highway runs from east to west across the southern portion of the commune but has no exit. Access to the commune is by road D392 which runs parallel but north of the highway and connects with Highway exit 8 to the east of the commune and west to Dorlisheim. Another access road is the D127 which comes from Jaegerhof just over the northern border (and where there is a railway station) south to the village then continuing south to Griesheim-pres-Molsheim. There are also a number of small country roads covering the commune. Most of the commune is farmland with some forests in the north-eastern portion.

The Bras de la Bruches flows through the commune from west to east, through the village then east to join the Muelbach and flows east under the name Altorfer Arm until it joins the La Bruche river north of Eintzheim Airport. In the north-east another waterway forms the north-eastern border of the commune.

The only other hamlet in the commune is that of Forstoff north-east of Altorf village.

=== Toponymy ===
It was known as Altum Coenobium in 787.

The origin of the commune name Altorf is from the form Alt-dorf (old town). The old spelling was still visible before the Second World War.

However, the spelling Altorf through Altorfium / Atorfium (related to Altum Coenobium) it is more likely to come from the Latin root altum.

=== Climate ===
The climate in this area has mild differences between highs and lows, and there is adequate rainfall year-round. The Köppen Climate Classification subtype for this climate is "Cfb" (Marine West Coast Climate/Oceanic climate).

== History ==
=== The Benedictine Abbey of Altorf ===
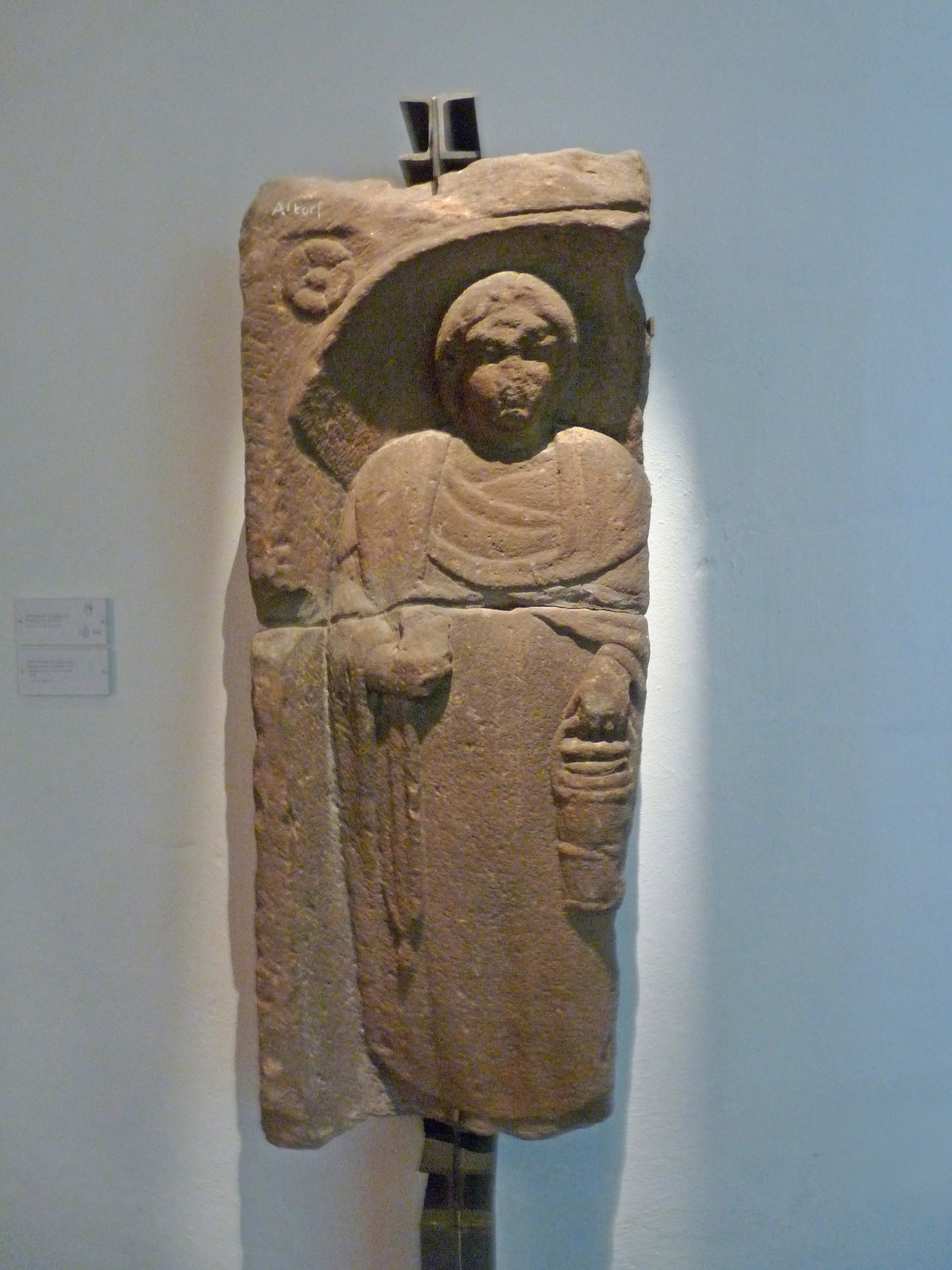
Funerary Stele from the 3rd century (Archeological Museum of Strasbourg)

Altorf is located on the ancient Roman via romana or Bergstrasse which connected Strasbourg to the strategic pass of Donon. The funerary steles of the 3rd century attest to a Roman presence.

Quickly the village's history became intertwined with that of its Benedictine abbey which was founded in 960 by Hugues III of Eguisheim called l'Enroue (Raucous), Count of Nordgau and his wife Countess Hewilde. His father, Count Eberhard IV was buried in the abbey in 972, sealing the connection between the family and Altorf.

The abbey had was built following a cenobite community of monks called the Altum Coenobium, which was reported in 787, where the name of the abbey and village came from.

Pope Leo IX, son of the powerful empire family of Eguisheim-Dabo came to Altorf in 1049 to honor his ancestors. He consecrated an altar to Saint Cyriac in 1079 and endowed it with relics (an arm of a saint, the remains of Santa Maria Via Lata from Rome). The reliquary in oriental style represents a bust in polychrome wood and with the words notitia altorfensis is one of the major parts of the abbey (second part of the 12th century).

Cyriac of Malaga, who had cured epilepsy of the daughter of the Emperor Diocletian in the 4th century, became the patron saint of the village and he is celebrated on 8 August. Altorf was a place of pilgrimage for epileptics and people possessed with demons with many healings reported in the abbey archives in the 13th century.

The chapel was consecrated in 974, under the leadership of Maïeul, Bishop of Cluny, and Erchembald, Bishop of Strasbourg. As with the abbeys of Steige and Marmoutier, the Altorf Abbey was very successful because of its many dependencies. The churches of Barembach and Grendelbruch, although relatively remote, were incorporated into the abbey by a papal bull of 1192 from Pope Celestin III which involved in particular the attachment of tithes. In particular its properties along the right bank of the Bruche extending from the course of the Rothaine into the plain of Alsace were attached to the bishopric of Strasbourg in 1226, extinguishing the line of Eguisheim.

In addition, the emperors gave the abbey the right to issue currency (currency of Saint Cyriac), from the Ottonian revival at the end of the 10th century. The Holy Roman Emperor Frederick Barbarossa explicitly recognized this right with a charter in 1153. In the 13th century, however, this privilege was transferred to Dachstein then Molsheim. The cultural influence of the abbey led to the establishment of a university (not to be confused with that of Altdorf near Nuremberg) which was subsequently transferred to Molsheim in the Carthusian heartland there to be moved aside to form the University of Strasbourg.

Economic and cultural power caused the shedding blood in Altorf in 1262 when the village and monastery were burned by the Strasbourgers who were in revolt against Bishop Walter de Geroldseck. In 1525 there was the peasant revolt which sacked the abbey (German Peasants' War). Finally a century later during the Thirty Years War which included Swedish and French forces.

In 1606, Altorf Abbey joined the Union of Bursfeld which included a hundred Benedictine monasteries and was in 1624 formally called the Benedictine Congregation of Strasbourg (covering the abbeys of Ebersmunster and Marmoutier in Alsace, as well as of Ettenheimmünster, Gengenbach, Schuttent, and Schwarzbach in Baden).

=== The Peasants' Headquarters ===
The Peasants' epic struggle (the Bundschuh or Deutscher Bauernkrieg), which had partly originated from the Holy Roman Empire in 1524, crystallized in Lower Alsace around Altorf, Dorlisheim, and Boersch. The leaders of the movement were Erasmus Gerber and Georg Ittel, respectively from Molsheim and Rosheim, established themselves with a group of 1500 men at their headquarters in Altorf, from where the contagion spread throughout the province in a week with their troops raiding monasteries and mistreating Jews.

Father Nartz reported these events in his monograph of 1887:

"From the first days of April, the Schultheiß of Rosheim: Ittel stood, with two townsfolk of Molsheim, at the head of the movement in the countryside. In a few days he had assembled a strong band of farmers of 1,500 men. From this number he chose messengers responsible to scour the area calling for men to convene on the plain of Altorf during the week of Easter. They then, armed with clubs, decided to finish with the nobility and clergy men. One group, consisting of countrymen from Epfig and Dambach, seized Ebersmunster and settled there; the second group was recruited closer to us: they gathered in the Val de Villé of Scherwiller at Saales and plundered the monastery of Honcourt and stole everything they could."

The revolt was put down a few weeks later, on 20 May 1525 near Saverne, by Duke Antoine de Lorraine with 18,000 of the insurgents dead.

=== The Thirty Years War ===
The Thirty Years War originated in Bohemia with the Defenestration of Prague (1618). It spread from 1620 through the entire Holy Roman Empire.

On this occasion, Swedish troops led by Marshal Gustaf Horn were stationed in the village in the autumn of 1632.

Engaged by the Swedish king Gustavus Adolphus in the European politico-religious conflict in support of the German Protestant princes, they practiced a policy of terror against Catholics in the region (the peasants fled at the cry of "Der Schwedt kommt" (the Swedes are coming), terrified by the "Swedish torture" or Schwedentrunk which consisted of ingesting manure to suffocation). The population of Altorf were almost exclusively Catholic at that time and so suffered from this presence as did Molsheim and Mutzig which was sacked in November 1632 with the help of Protestants in the neighbouring village of Dorlisheim who put ladders at the disposal of the Swedes to scale the ramparts.

In this regard, Altorf constituted an anchor point in the reconquest of the catholic Counter-Reformation, a reconquest which had been prepared by opening a college of Jesuits in Molsheim in 1580. The style and decoration of the church are particularly characteristic, very similar to those that can be seen in other Habsburg lands (Vienna and Prague in particular).

The epitaph of the Abbot Matern recounts success in 1686 in bringing the inhabitants of the commune of Duttlenheim to the Roman Church by making them leave the "Luther sect". This period of the war was difficult for the population judging by the fact that the wealthy abbey had to pledge the abbey cross in 1637 which it was able to recover only twenty years later.

The human toll of the Thirty Years War for Altorf—and more generally for Alsace—was very severe. This was compounded by the resilience of the plague and famine due to the harsh winters of the Little Ice Age. The demographic impact was probably comparable to that of other regions of the Holy Roman Empire, such as Württemberg who lost 80% of its population at the same time.

=== The French Revolution ===
In 1791, the abbey was dissolved by the revolutionaries and the thirteen Benedictine monks were forced to leave. Father Cyriakus Spitz became the last in a succession of abbots over 800 years.

The Romanesque tympanum over the main door was destroyed and was replaced in 1886 by the sculptor Eugène Dock.

All the buildings constituting the abbey with its outbuildings were razed in the 19th century except for the wing of the abbey who has recently been the presbytery office.

=== Current situation of the reconstruction of the abbey ===
The abbey and its outbuildings have been rebuilt several times including in 1180 with the construction of a new abbey which followed the first work commissioned in 1133 by Father Otton.

The most notable works are those of the convent buildings and transept from 1715 by the Austrian Baroque master Peter Thumb, the construction of the organ by André Silbermann in 1723, and, from 1985 to 1991, a complete restoration under the supervision of the Parson Henri Host.

The church was protected as a Historical Monument in 1932, registered in 1937, and gazetted in 1983.

In 2000 the lintel of the door of the village (Klostertor) which was damaged in 1965 was restored. In 2001 the Tithe Barn (Zehntelschir) was transformed into a library. In 2004 the Abbey Gardens (Hortus, herbarium, Pomarium) were restored, equipped, and opened to the public.

=== Heraldry ===
| Arms of Altorf | Blazon: Azure, a meat-hook of Or hooked to an annulet the same |

== Administration ==
List of Successive Mayors of Altorf

Mayors from 1815 to 1942

| From | To | Name |
|---|---|---|
| 1815 | 1832 | Thomas Klein |
| 1832 | 1848 | Amand Klein |
| 1848 | 1870 | Joseph Schaeffer |
| 1870 | 1877 | Alois Bürel |
| 1877 | 1886 | Charles Schaeffer |
| 1886 | 1890 | Nicolas Foesser |
| 1890 | 1909 | Charles Schaeffer |
| 1909 | 1919 | Aloise Heller |
| 1919 | 1927 | Aloise Voltz |
| 1927 | 1942 | Auguste Salomon |

Mayors from 1942

| From | To | Name |
|---|---|---|
| 1942 | 1944 | Lucien Vetter |
| 1945 | 1947 | Aloise Schaeffer |
| 1947 | 1965 | Charles Meppiel |
| 1965 | 1971 | Eugène Eyder |
| 1971 | 1977 | Antoine Klein |
| 1977 | 1983 | Marcel Schaeffer |
| 1983 | 2001 | Antoine Klein |
| 2001 | 2008 | Régine Kientzi |
| 2008 | 2020 | Gérard Adolph |
| 2020 | 2026 | Bruno Eyder |

== Demography ==
The inhabitants of the commune are known as Altorfois or Altorfoises in French.

Historical population

| Year | Pop. | ±% p.a. |
|---|---|---|
| 1793 | 625 | — |
| 1800 | 719 | +2.02% |
| 1806 | 772 | +1.19% |
| 1821 | 851 | +0.65% |
| 1831 | 895 | +0.51% |
| 1836 | 913 | +0.40% |
| 1841 | 937 | +0.52% |
| 1846 | 945 | +0.17% |
| 1851 | 976 | +0.65% |
| 1856 | 934 | −0.88% |
| 1861 | 920 | −0.30% |
| 1866 | 943 | +0.50% |
| 1872 | 913 | −0.54% |
| 1875 | 828 | −3.20% |
| 1880 | 858 | +0.71% |
| 1885 | 818 | −0.95% |
| 1890 | 806 | −0.30% |
| 1895 | 792 | −0.35% |
| 1900 | 757 | −0.90% |

| Year | Pop. | ±% p.a. |
|---|---|---|
| 1905 | 765 | +0.21% |
| 1910 | 790 | +0.65% |
| 1921 | 744 | −0.54% |
| 1926 | 777 | +0.87% |
| 1931 | 809 | +0.81% |
| 1936 | 824 | +0.37% |
| 1946 | 826 | +0.02% |
| 1954 | 813 | −0.20% |
| 1962 | 814 | +0.02% |
| 1968 | 796 | −0.37% |
| 1975 | 746 | −0.92% |
| 1982 | 883 | +2.44% |
| 1990 | 941 | +0.80% |
| 1999 | 1,100 | +1.75% |
| 2007 | 1,179 | +0.87% |
| 2012 | 1,280 | +1.66% |
| 2017 | 1,293 | +0.20% |
| 2023 | 1,447 | +1.89% |

Source: EHESS and INSEE

== Culture and heritage ==
=== Civil heritage ===
The commune has a number of buildings and structures that are registered as historical monuments:

- A Farmhouse at 4 Rue des Meuniers (1787)
- A Farmhouse at 7 Rue des Meuniers (19th century)
- The Town Hall / School at 12 Rue Principale (1869). The Town Hall contains a Boundary Stone (1764) which is registered as an historical object.
- A Farmhouse at 16 Rue Principale (18th century)
- A Farmhouse at 27 Rue Principale (1797)
- A Guardhouse at 29 Rue Principale (18th century) formerly the Wachstub.
- A Well at 41 Rue Principale (1617)
- A Tannery at 56 Rue Principale (1845)
- A Public Bench at RD 127 (1863)
- A Well at Place Saint-Cyriaque (1600)
- A Farmhouse at 3 Place Saint-Cyriaque (17th century)
- A Farmhouse at 5 Route de Strasbourg (1843). The farm contains a high-relief: Trinity and Virgin (1843) that is registered as an historical object.
- A Mansion at Jaegerhof (18th century)
- Houses and Farms (17th-20th century)

=== Religious heritage ===
The commune has several religious buildings and structures that are registered as historical monuments:

- The Chapel at Rue de la Chapelle (1846). The chapel contains two items that are registered as historical objects:
  - Movable items and monuments of secondary interest
  - A set of 2 Paintings (1869)
- The Benedictine Abbey Tithe Barn at 10 Cour de la Dime (1749) now converted into a library.
- The Benedictine Abbey Mill and Farm at Cour de la Dime (1749)
- An Abbey at Place Saint-Cyriaque (12th century)
- The Benedictine Abbey Well at Place Saint-Cyriaque (1739)
- The Church of Saint-Cyriaque (former abbey church) at Place Saint-Cyriaque (1725). The church contains a very large number of items that are registered as historical objects.
- The Benedictine Abbey at Place Saint-Cyriaque (10th century). The abbey contains two items that are registered as historical objects:
  - Movable items and monuments of secondary interest
  - A Bas-relief: Head of an Abbot (1568)
- The Benedictine Abbey Gatehouse at 5 Place Saint-Cyriaque (1663)
- The Benedictine Abbey Lodgings at 6 Place Saint-Cyriaque (1708). The Lodgings contain several items that are registered as historical objects:
  - A Cabinet (1) (18th century)
  - A Cabinet (2) (18th century)
  - A Corbel (17th century)
  - A Cabinet (3) (18th century)
- A Funeral Structure (Iron Age)

=== The Church of Saint Cyriac ===
This Benedictine church was founded in 960 by Hugh III of Eguisheim, was rebuilt in the 12th century, then again in the 17th century after a fire, and, more significantly, in the 18th century.

The church is unique and majestic through a combination of a Romanesque triple nave with sides in cut stone (17th century) in one part and baroque elements baroque in the other part with the choir and transept in masonry and stone from the first quarter of the 18th century.

The centre is topped by an octagonal bell tower made of wood and covered with slated wood-scale. It was destroyed in the Second World War and rebuilt afterwards.

The Baroque reconstruction commissioned by Abbot Amandus (Amand Zimmerman) was conducted by the Austrian master Peter Thumb in 1715 for the convent buildings and 1724 for the choir and transept. The wing of the abbey (the current presbytery) was made in 1707 by Albert Regitz d'Obernai.

These works were completed in 1727 with stuccoed decor: a marble altar with carved figures depicting a miraculous cure of Saint Cyriac, imposing oak stalls, and then an organ in 1730. The organ was originally commissioned by the Franciscans of Sarrebourg from the famous organ builder André Silbermann from Saxony but was finally acquired by the abbey of Altorf and harmoniously complements the baroque surroundings.

The porter's house guarding the entrance to the tithe barn is part of the church and the rectory of the few elements of the abbey that still exist today. The cloister, the house, and the outbuildings were destroyed during the French Revolution and in the 19th century.

The church formerly contained the tombs of the Dabo ancestors of Pope Leo IX and the House of Lorraine.

Many other objects (altar, chalice, etc.) are included in the Palissy database and protected as such.

=== Tombstone of Conrad de Gougenheim ===
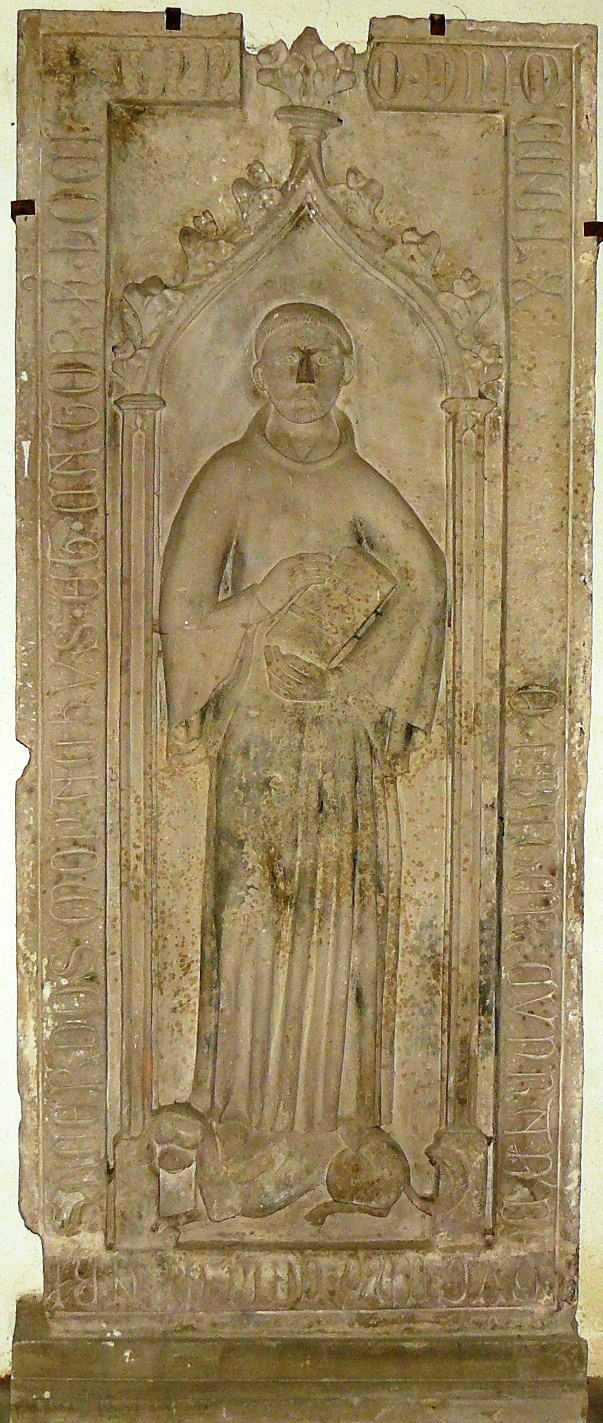
Tombstone of Conrad de Gougenheim

The Church has in its inventory a tombstone bearing the image of the monk Conrad de Gougenheim, steward of the abbey in the middle of the 14th century. He was in charge of the finances of the convent but also conducted religious affairs.

The tombstone depicts the deceased standing between two small columns surmounted with a flowered bracket. He holds in his hand a book while his feet stand on a dog.

=== The Renaissance well ===
Made of Vosges pink sandstone. After a few years outside the walls of the Saint Cyriaque abbey the well was returned to its original place in 1739 in the gardens of the abbey on the occasion of their opening to the public.

=== Standing stones ===
Situated in the locality of Gansweidt the Menhir, or standing stones, mark the boundary of the village from their 40-metre height. They probably date back to before Celtic settlement of the region.

The coat of arms of the village is visible halfway up (a late sculpture). Registered on 20 May 1930 as a historical monument.

=== The Cloister Gardens ===
The cloister's gardens were open to the public in 2004.

The journey through the Pomarium (garden cemetery), the Herbularius (herb garden), and the Hortus (vegetable garden) testifies to the high level of organization of Benedictine monastic life according to the Rule of Saint Benedict "Ora et Labora" ("prayer and work").

== Photo gallery ==
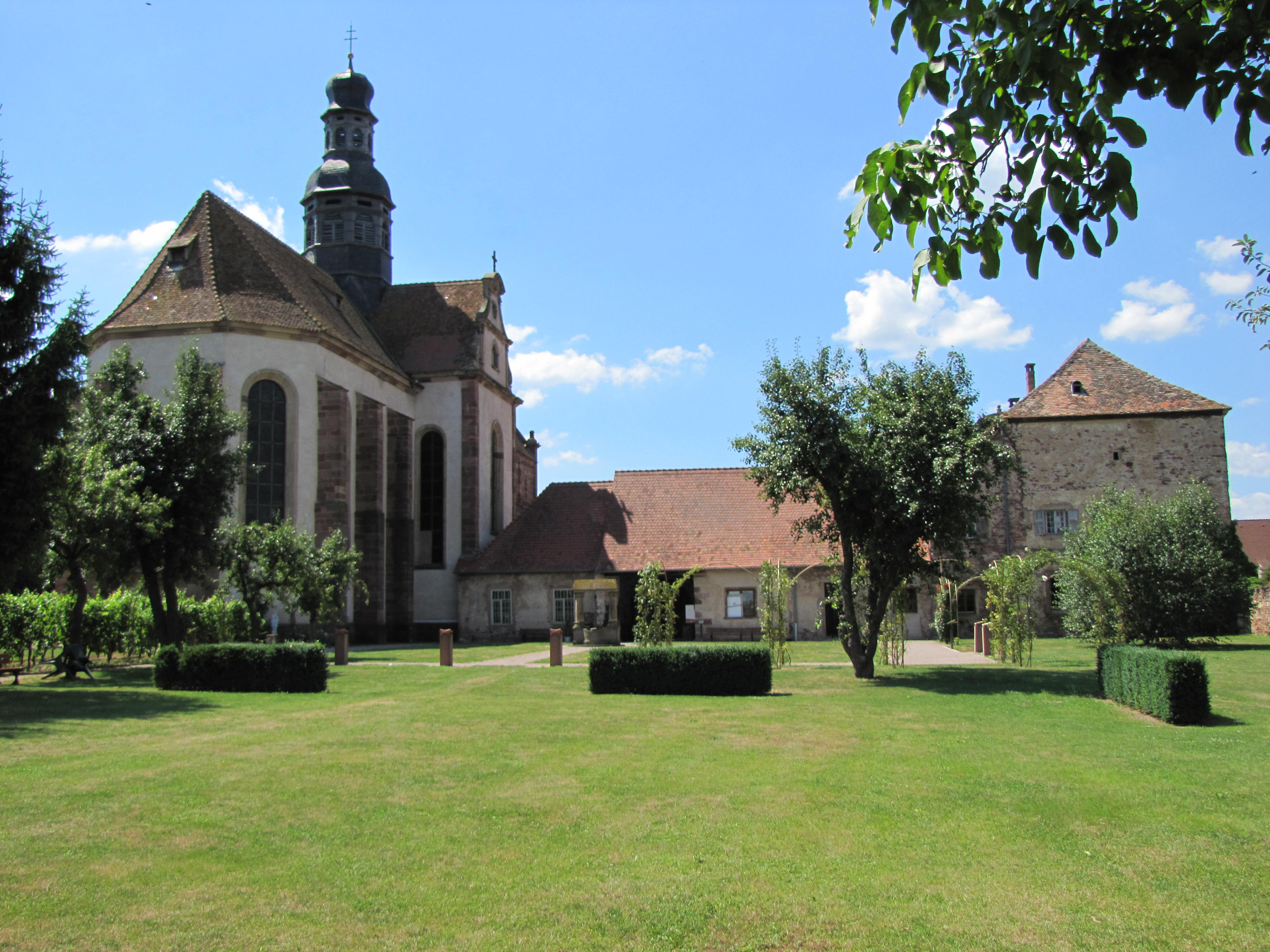
Altorf Abbey

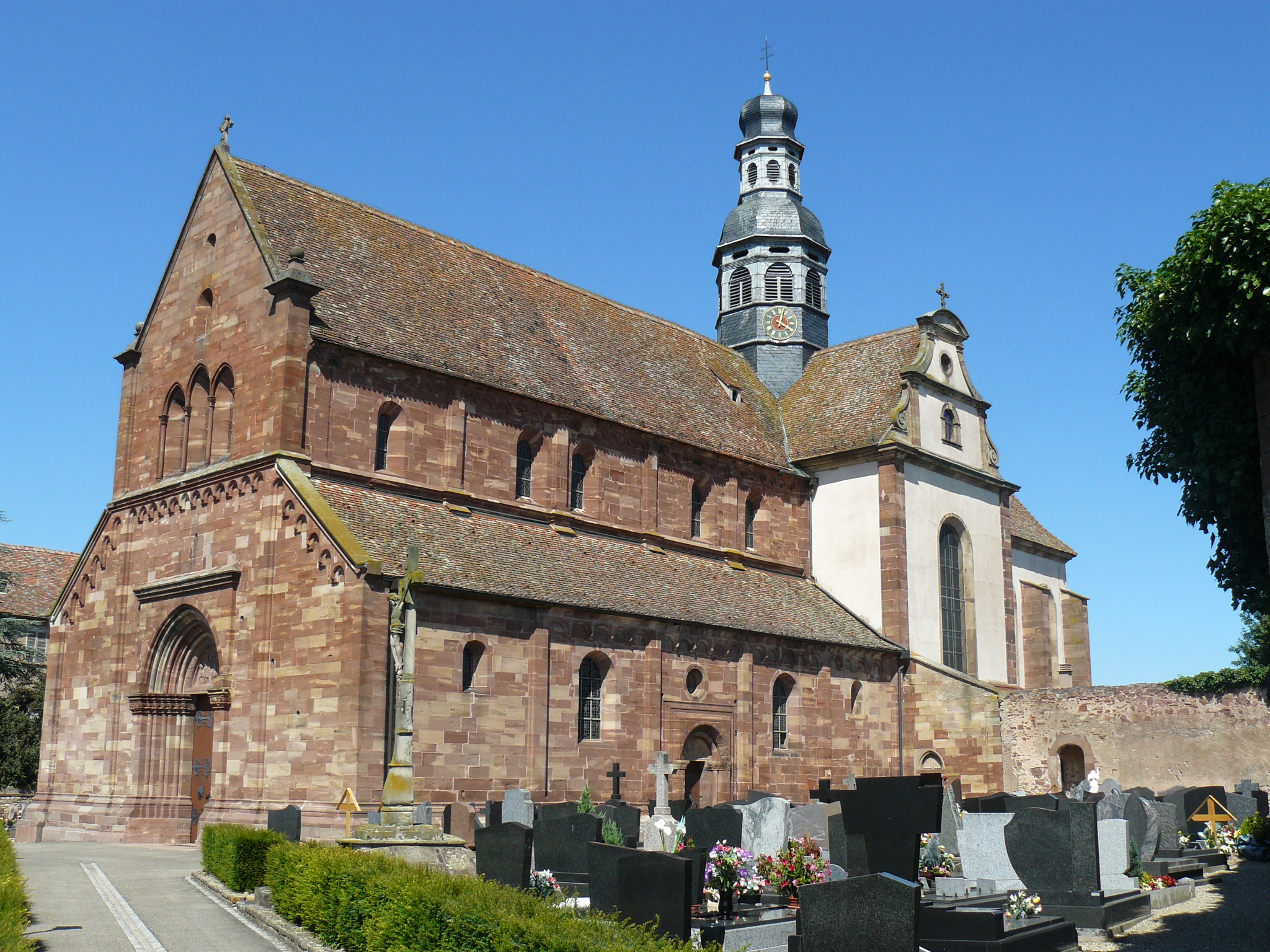
Abbey Church

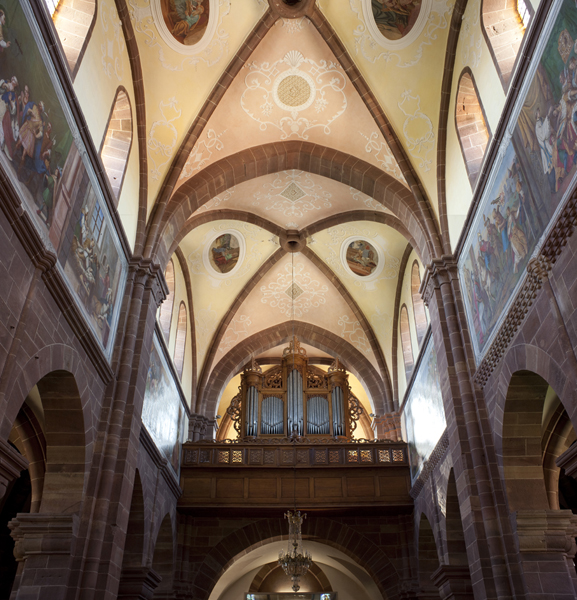
Abbey Church inside

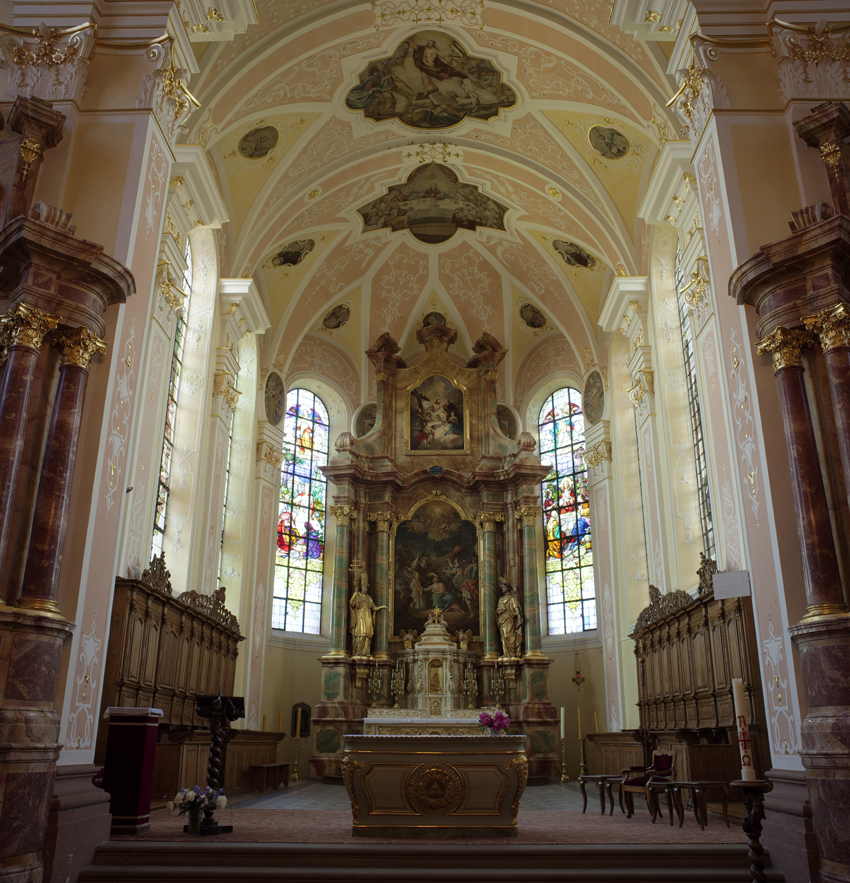
Abbey Church inside

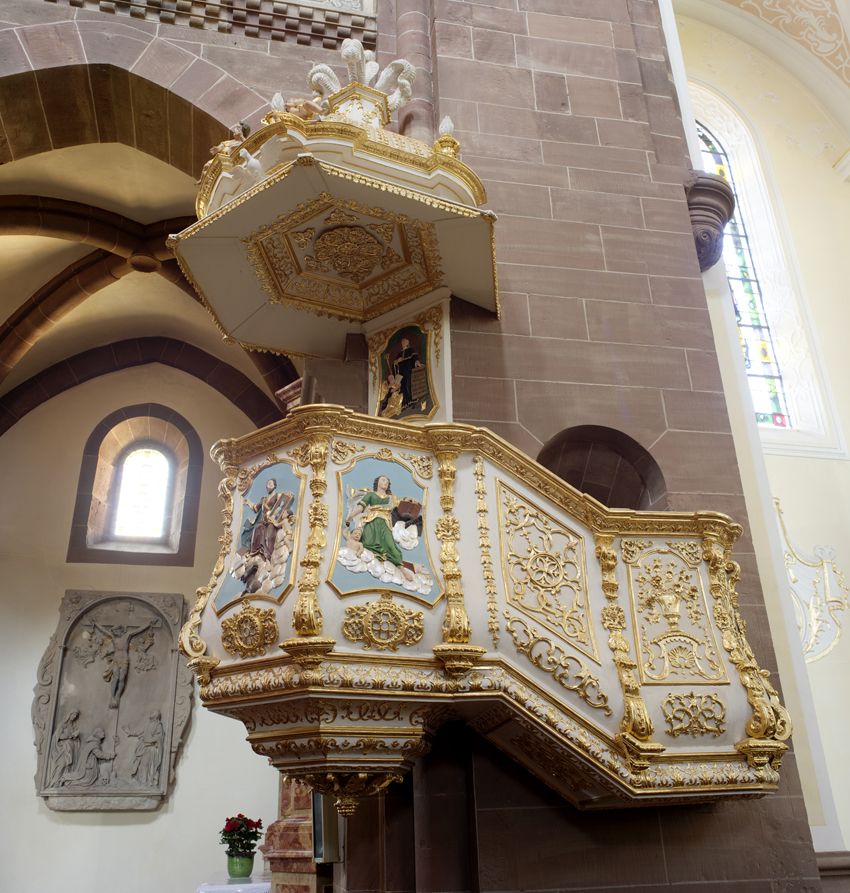
Pulpit

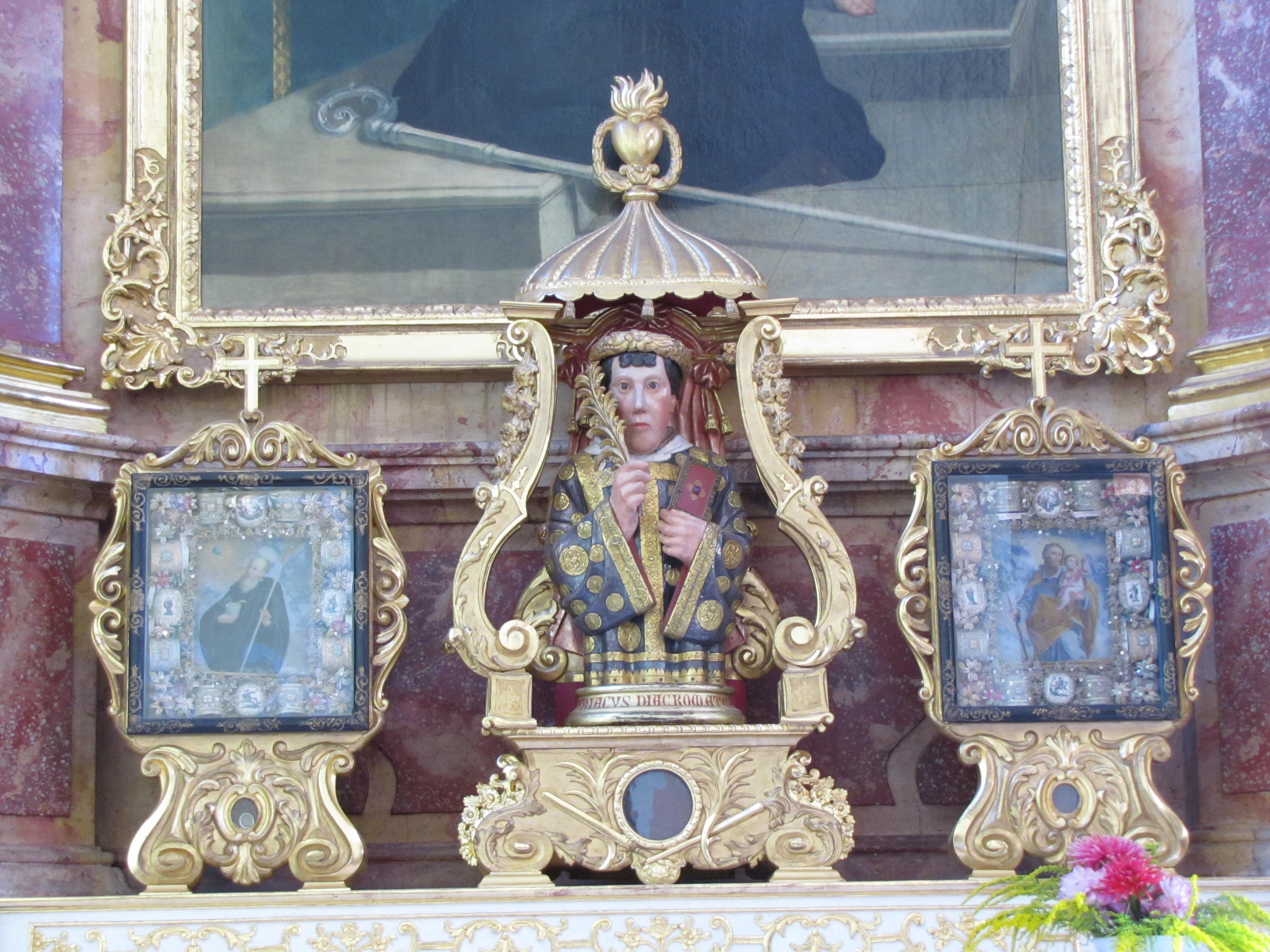
Reliquary of St Cyriacus (center)

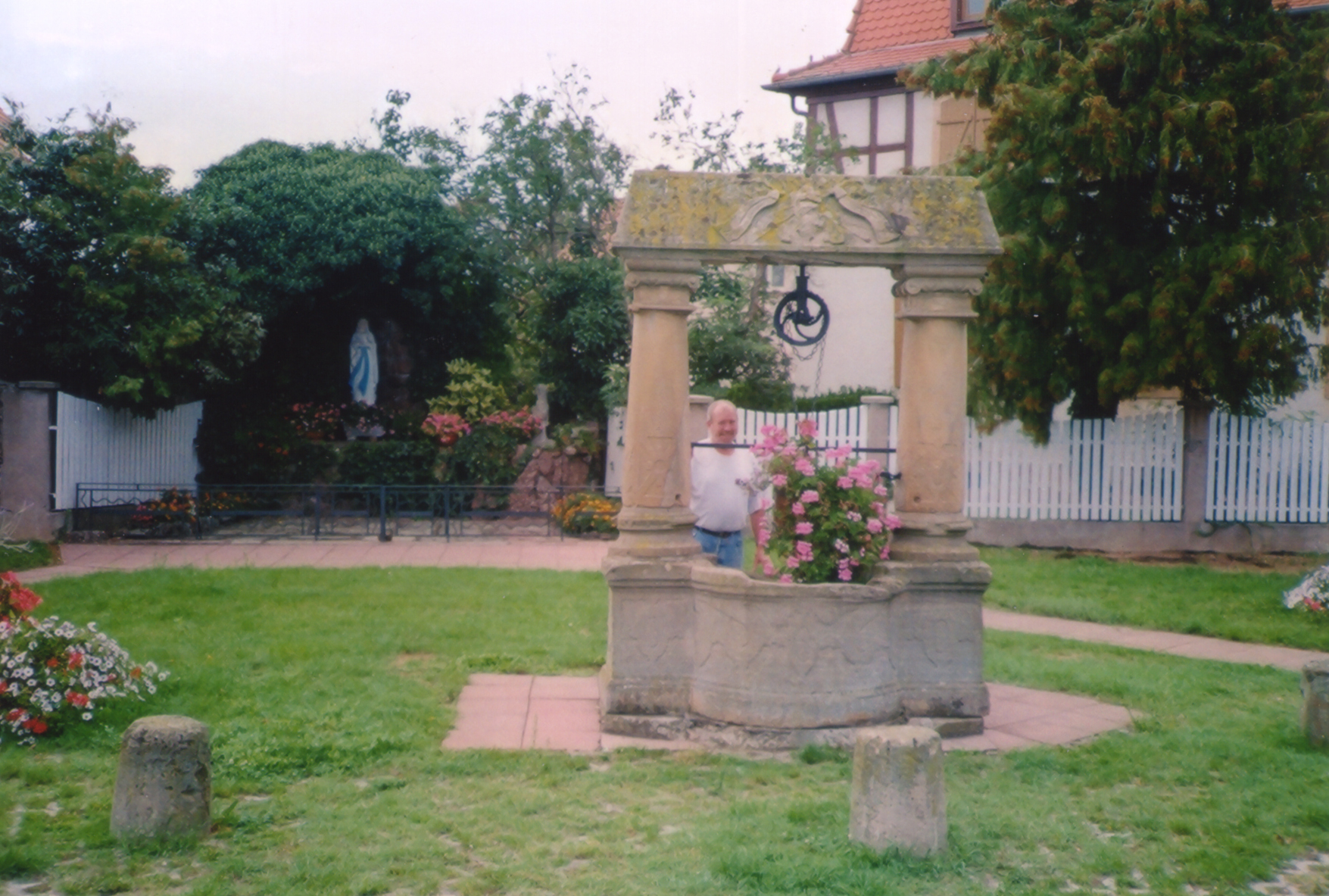
Renaissance Well

== See also ==
- Welf, count of Altorf d. 825.
- Communes of the Bas-Rhin department

=== Bibliography ===
- P. Magnus Sattler, Kurze Geschichte der Benedictiner-Abtei von Altdorf, Strassburg Bauer (1887) (in German)
- Abbé Nartz, Val de Villé, it sorigins in the 17th century, éditions Lorisse (1887) (in French)
- Archange Sieffert, Altdorf, Geschichte von Abtei und Dorf, Koenigshofen Saint Fidèle (1950) (in German)
- Günter Metken, Saint Cyriakus in Altdorf, éditions Schnell u. Steiner Verlag (1966)
- Henri Host, Catholic Parish Church, former Benedictine Abbey of Saint Cyriaque at Altorf, éditions Schnell und Steiner (1981) (in French)
- Philippe Dollinger, Raymond Oberle, History of Alsace, from Prehistory to today, éditions SAEP (1985) (in French)
- Jean Vogt, Property owners, Entrepreneurs, and heads of the village at Altorf at the beginning of the 19th century, (1986) (in French)
- E. Fritsch, Church of Saint-Cyriaque at Altorf, former benedictine abbey, Éditions du Signe (2004) (in French)
- Charles Walther, The Thirty Years War in Alsace, Société d'histoire et d'archéologie du Ried Nord (2006) (in French)
