= Arrondissement of Molsheim =

Coordinates: 48°33′N 7°29′E

Molsheim
- Arrondissement
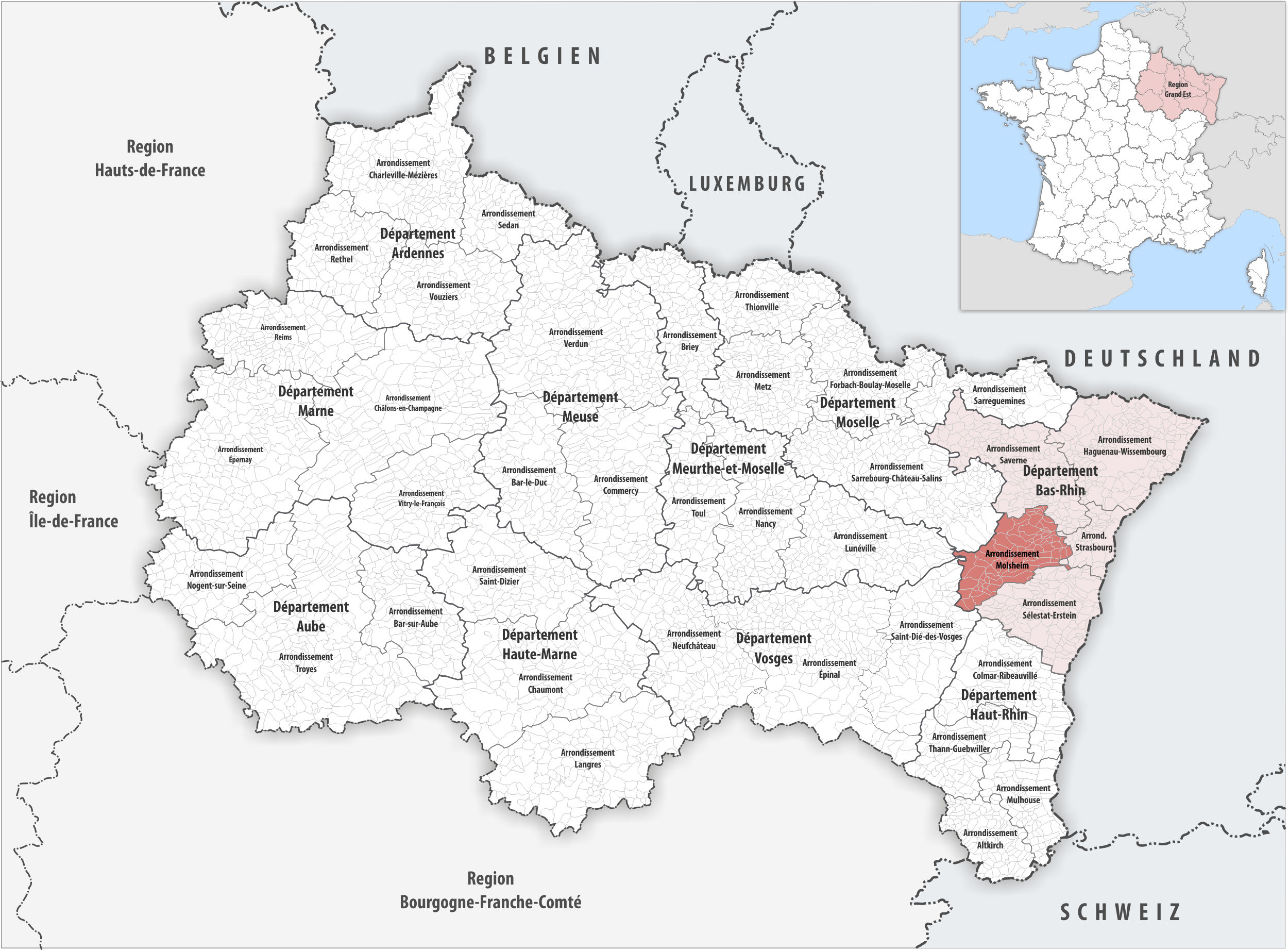
- Location within the region Grand Est
- Country: France
- Region: Grand Est
- Department: Bas-Rhin
- No. of communes: {{{nbcomm}}}
- Area: 771.2 km^{2} (297.8 sq mi)
- Population (2023): 104,850
  - Density: 136.0/km^{2} (352.1/sq mi)
- INSEE code: 673

The Arrondissement of Molsheim (French: Arrondissement de Molsheim; Alsatian: Arrondissement Molse) is an arrondissement of France in the Bas-Rhin department in the Grand Est region. It has 77 communes. Its population is 104,391 (2021), and its area is 771.2 km^{2} (297.8 sq mi).

== Composition ==
The communes of the arrondissement of Molsheim are:

1. Altorf
2. Avolsheim
3. Balbronn
4. Barembach
5. Bellefosse
6. Belmont
7. Bergbieten
8. Bischoffsheim
9. Blancherupt
10. Bœrsch
11. Bourg-Bruche
12. La Broque
13. Colroy-la-Roche
14. Cosswiller
15. Crastatt
16. Dachstein
17. Dahlenheim
18. Dangolsheim
19. Dinsheim-sur-Bruche
20. Dorlisheim
21. Duppigheim
22. Duttlenheim
23. Ergersheim
24. Ernolsheim-Bruche
25. Flexbourg
26. Fouday
27. Grandfontaine
28. Grendelbruch
29. Gresswiller
30. Griesheim-près-Molsheim
31. Heiligenberg
32. Hohengœft
33. Jetterswiller
34. Kirchheim
35. Knœrsheim
36. Lutzelhouse
37. Marlenheim
38. Mollkirch
39. Molsheim
40. Muhlbach-sur-Bruche
41. Mutzig
42. Natzwiller
43. Neuviller-la-Roche
44. Niederhaslach
45. Nordheim
46. Oberhaslach
47. Odratzheim
48. Ottrott
49. Plaine
50. Rangen
51. Ranrupt
52. Romanswiller
53. Rosenwiller
54. Rosheim
55. Rothau
56. Russ
57. Saales
58. Saint-Blaise-la-Roche
59. Saint-Nabor
60. Saulxures
61. Scharrachbergheim-Irmstett
62. Schirmeck
63. Solbach
64. Soultz-les-Bains
65. Still
66. Traenheim
67. Urmatt
68. Waldersbach
69. Wangen
70. Wangenbourg-Engenthal
71. Wasselonne
72. Westhoffen
73. Wildersbach
74. Wisches
75. Wolxheim
76. Zehnacker
77. Zeinheim

== History ==
The arrondissement of Molsheim was created in 1919. In January 2015 it gained seven communes from the arrondissement of Saverne and one commune from the former arrondissement of Strasbourg-Campagne.

As a result of the reorganisation of the cantons of France which came into effect in 2015, the borders of the cantons are no longer related to the borders of the arrondissements. The cantons of the arrondissement of Molsheim were, as of January 2015:

1. Molsheim
2. Rosheim
3. Saales
4. Schirmeck
5. Wasselonne
