= Kirchheim =

Kirchheim may refer to:

== Place name ==
Australia

- Kirchheim was the name of Haigslea, Queensland until the first World War

Austria

- Kirchheim im Innkreis, a town in Upper Austria
  - Ried-Kirchheim Airport, a private-use airport near Kirchheim im Innkreis

France

- Kirchheim, Bas-Rhin, a municipality in the Bas-Rhin department

Germany

- Euskirchen-Kirchheim, a borough of Euskirchen in North Rhine-Westphalia
- Heidelberg-Kirchheim, a district of the city of Heidelberg, Baden-Württemberg
  - Heidelberg-Kirchheim/Rohrbach station, a railway station
  - SG Heidelberg-Kirchheim, an association football club
- Kirchheim, Hesse, a municipality in Hesse
- Kirchheim, Lower Franconia, a municipality in the district of Würzburg, Bavaria
- Kirchheim, Thuringia, a municipality in Thuringia
- Kirchheim am Neckar, a municipality in Baden-Württemberg
- Kirchheim am Ries, a municipality in Baden-Württemberg
- Kirchheim an der Weinstraße, a municipality in Rhineland-Palatinate
- Kirchheim bei München, a municipality in Bavaria
- Kirchheim in Schwaben, a municipality in the district Unterallgäu in Bavaria
- Kirchheim unter Teck, a town in Baden-Württemberg
  - Schloss Kirchheim (Teck), a castle
  - VfL Kirchheim Knights, a professional basketball club based in Kirchheim unter Teck
  - VfL Kirchheim/Teck, an association football club based in Kirchheim unter Teck
- Kirchheimbolanden, a city in Rhineland-Palatinate
- Tittmoning-Kirchheim, a borough of Tittmoning in Bavaria

Slovenia

- Kirchheim was the German name of the city Cerkno

== Surname ==
- Heinrich Kirchheim (1882–1973), German soldier who served during both World Wars
- Raphael Kirchheim (1804–89), German Jewish scholar
