= Flexbourg =

- Commune
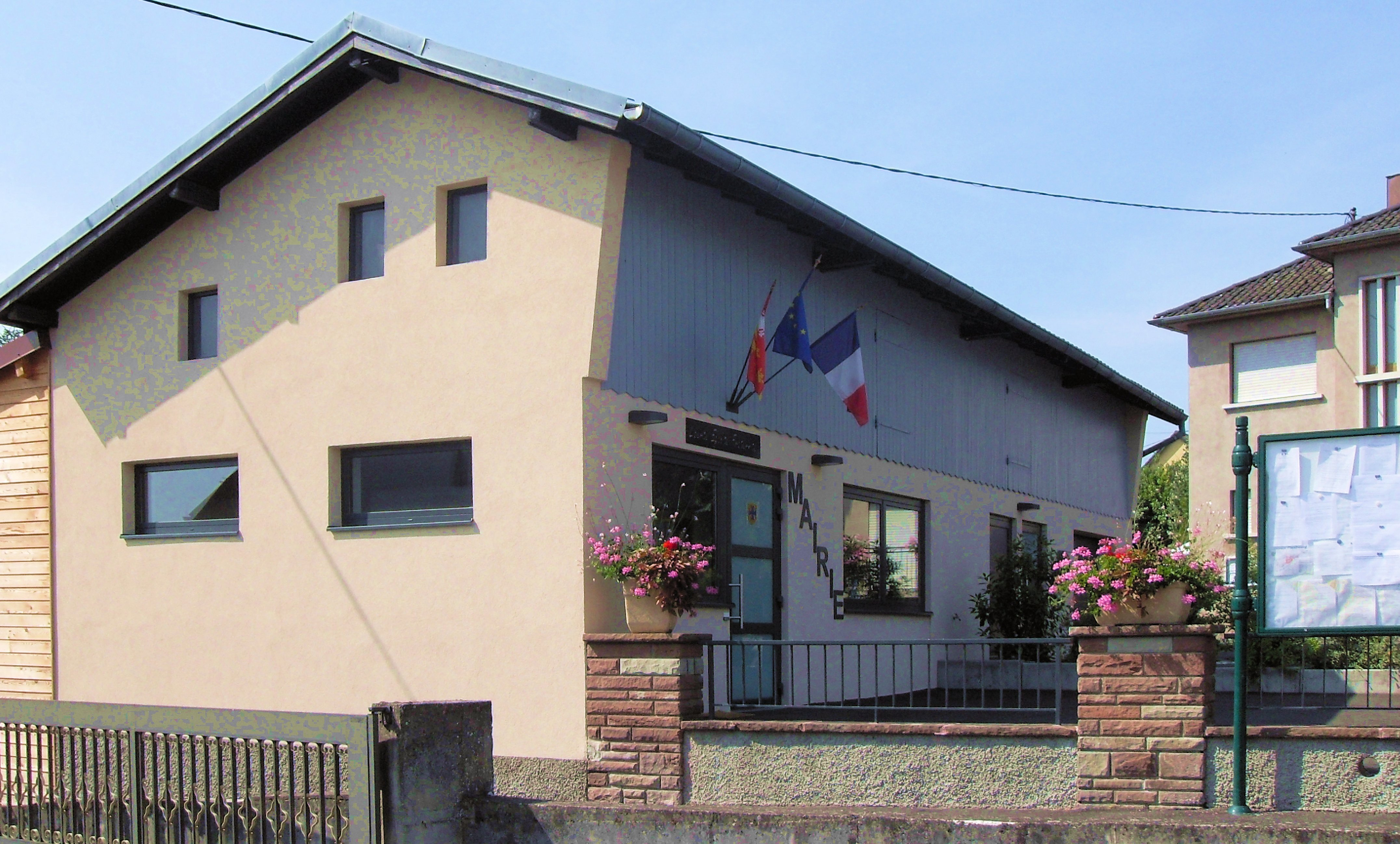
- The town hall in Flexbourg

- Coat of arms
- Location of Flexbourg
- Location within France Location within Grand Est
- Coordinates: 48°34′21″N 7°25′54″E
- Country: France
- Region: Grand Est
- Department: Bas-Rhin
- Arrondissement: Molsheim
- Canton: Molsheim

Government
  - Mayor (2020–2026): Denis Turin
- Area^{1}: 1.7 km^{2} (0.66 sq mi)
- Highest elevation: 273 m (896 ft)
- Lowest elevation: 209 m (686 ft)
- Population (2023): 485
  - Density: 290/km^{2} (740/sq mi)
- Time zone: UTC+01:00 (CET)
  - Summer (DST): UTC+02:00 (CEST)
- INSEE/Postal code: 67139 /67310
- ^{1} French Land Register data, which excludes lakes, ponds, glaciers > 1 km^{2} (0.386 sq mi or 247 acres) and river estuaries.

Flexbourg (French pronunciation: [flɛksbuʁ]; German: Flexburg) is a commune in the Bas-Rhin department in Grand Est in north-eastern France.

== Decline and revival ==
Between 1806 and 1836 the registered population increased from 524 to 622, before falling back to 265 by 1962. Since then it has picked up, to stand at 499 in 2012.

== See also ==
- Communes of the Bas-Rhin department
