= Saint-Nabor =

- Commune
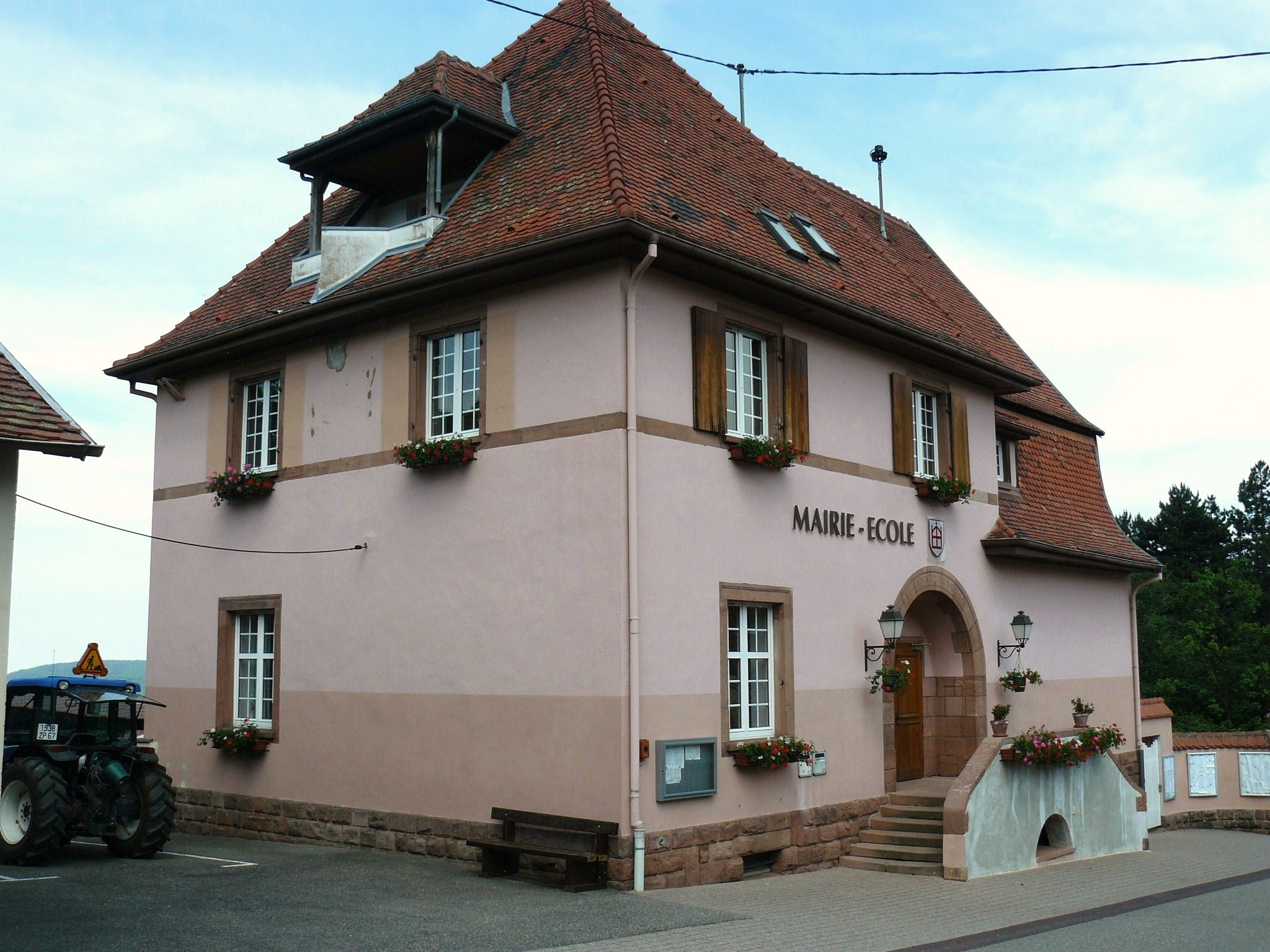
- The town hall in Saint-Nabor

- Coat of arms
- Location of Saint-Nabor
- Location within France Location within Grand Est
- Coordinates: 48°26′46″N 7°25′28″E
- Country: France
- Region: Grand Est
- Department: Bas-Rhin
- Arrondissement: Molsheim
- Canton: Molsheim

Government
  - Mayor (2020–2026): Régis Muller
- Area^{1}: 1.89 km^{2} (0.73 sq mi)
- Highest elevation: 630 m (2,070 ft)
- Lowest elevation: 265 m (869 ft)
- Population (2023): 512
  - Density: 271/km^{2} (702/sq mi)
- Time zone: UTC+01:00 (CET)
  - Summer (DST): UTC+02:00 (CEST)
- INSEE/Postal code: 67428 /67530
- ^{1} French Land Register data, which excludes lakes, ponds, glaciers > 1 km^{2} (0.386 sq mi or 247 acres) and river estuaries.

Saint-Nabor (French pronunciation: [sɛ̃ nabɔʁ]; German: Sankt Nabor) is a commune in the Bas-Rhin department in Grand Est in north-eastern France.

== See also ==
- Communes of the Bas-Rhin department
