= Nordheim, Bas-Rhin =

Nordheim Nààrde
- Commune
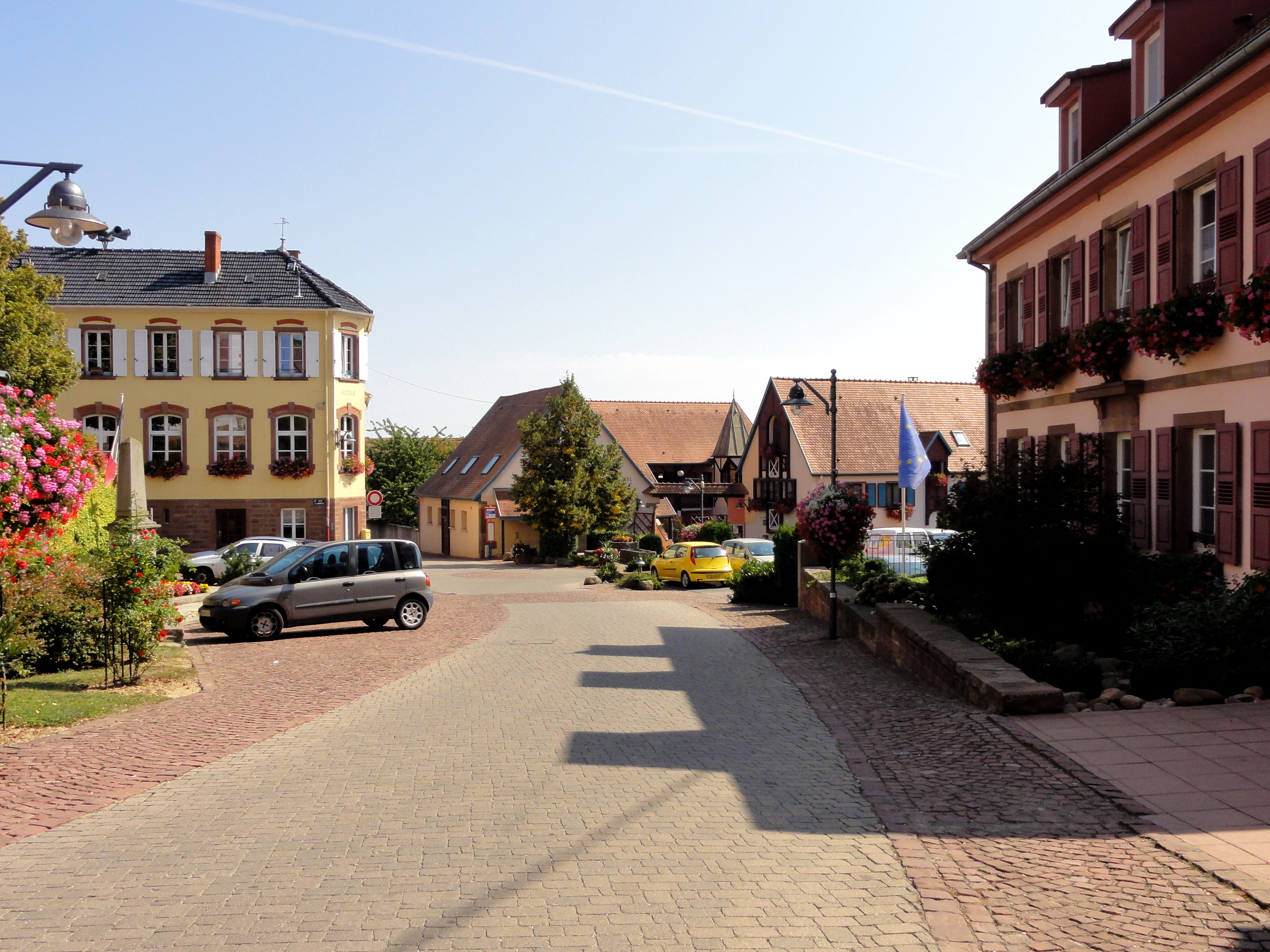
- Town hallsquare, Nordheim

- Coat of arms
- Location of Nordheim
- Location within France Location within Grand Est
- Coordinates: 48°38′11″N 7°30′36″E
- Country: France
- Region: Grand Est
- Department: Bas-Rhin
- Arrondissement: Molsheim
- Canton: Molsheim

Government
  - Mayor (2020–2026): Christophe Malingrey
- Area^{1}: 6.32 km^{2} (2.44 sq mi)
- Elevation: 240 m (790 ft)
- Highest elevation: 384 m (1,260 ft)
- Lowest elevation: 188 m (617 ft)
- Population (2023): 945
  - Density: 150/km^{2} (387/sq mi)
- Time zone: UTC+01:00 (CET)
  - Summer (DST): UTC+02:00 (CEST)
- INSEE/Postal code: 67335 /67520
- ^{1} French Land Register data, which excludes lakes, ponds, glaciers > 1 km^{2} (0.386 sq mi or 247 acres) and river estuaries.

Nordheim (French pronunciation: [nɔʁdaim]; Alsatian: Nààrde, Norde) is a commune in the Bas-Rhin department in Grand Est in north-eastern France.

Near Nordheim, there is a TV transmitter with a 280-metre guyed mast.

== See also ==
- Communes of the Bas-Rhin department
