= Dangolsheim =

Dangolsheim Dàngelse
- Commune
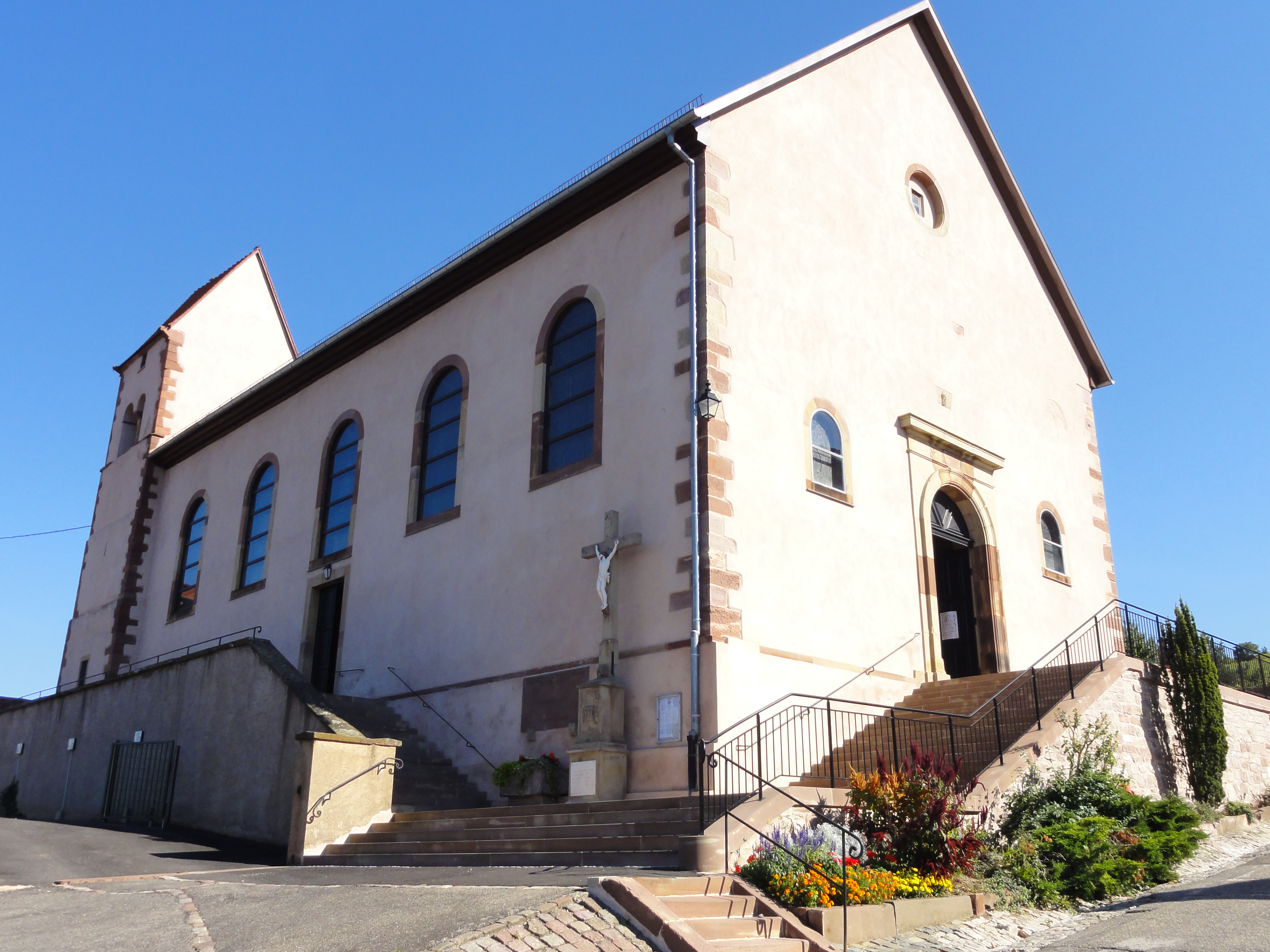
- The church in Dangolsheim

- Coat of arms
- Location of Dangolsheim
- Location within France Location within Grand Est
- Coordinates: 48°34′20″N 7°28′05″E
- Country: France
- Region: Grand Est
- Department: Bas-Rhin
- Arrondissement: Molsheim
- Canton: Molsheim

Government
  - Mayor (2020–2026): Fabien Blaess
- Area^{1}: 4.47 km^{2} (1.73 sq mi)
- Highest elevation: 384 m (1,260 ft)
- Lowest elevation: 172 m (564 ft)
- Population (2023): 681
  - Density: 152/km^{2} (395/sq mi)
- Time zone: UTC+01:00 (CET)
  - Summer (DST): UTC+02:00 (CEST)
- INSEE/Postal code: 67085 /67310
- ^{1} French Land Register data, which excludes lakes, ponds, glaciers > 1 km^{2} (0.386 sq mi or 247 acres) and river estuaries.

Dangolsheim is a commune in the Bas-Rhin department in Grand Est in north-eastern France.

== See also ==
- Communes of the Bas-Rhin department
