= Dahlenheim =

Dahlenheim Dàhle
- Commune
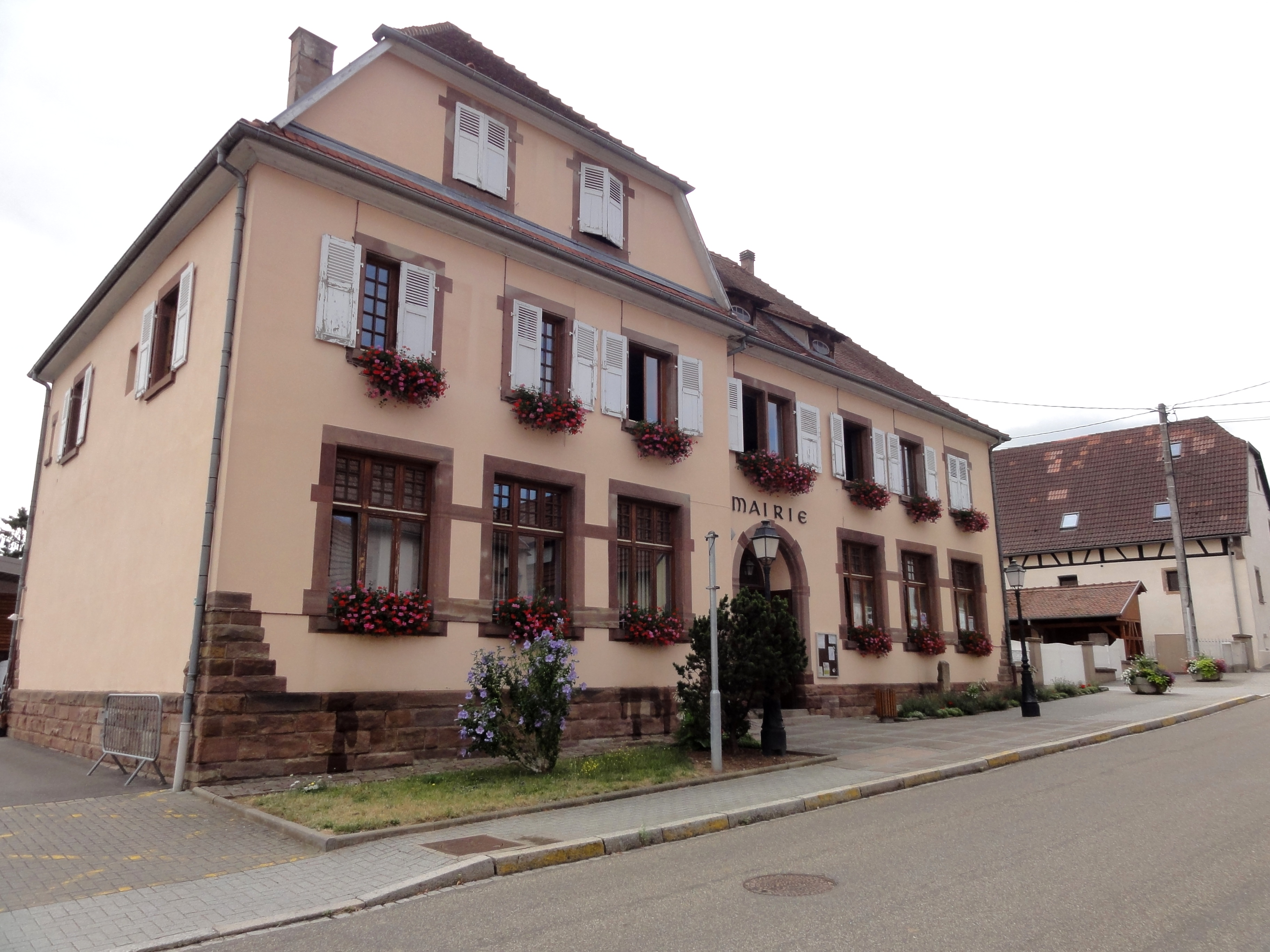
- The town hall in Dahlenheim

- Coat of arms
- Location of Dahlenheim
- Location within France Location within Grand Est
- Coordinates: 48°35′10″N 7°30′29″E
- Country: France
- Region: Grand Est
- Department: Bas-Rhin
- Arrondissement: Molsheim
- Canton: Molsheim
- Intercommunality: Mossig et Vignoble

Government
  - Mayor (2020–2026): Nicolas Winling
- Area^{1}: 5.35 km^{2} (2.07 sq mi)
- Highest elevation: 291 m (955 ft)
- Lowest elevation: 170 m (560 ft)
- Population (2023): 762
  - Density: 142/km^{2} (369/sq mi)
- Time zone: UTC+01:00 (CET)
  - Summer (DST): UTC+02:00 (CEST)
- INSEE/Postal code: 67081 /67310
- ^{1} French Land Register data, which excludes lakes, ponds, glaciers > 1 km^{2} (0.386 sq mi or 247 acres) and river estuaries.

Dahlenheim (French pronunciation: [dalənaim]; Alsatian: Dàhle) is a commune in the Bas-Rhin department in Grand Est in north-eastern France.

== Population ==
Historical population
Year	Pop.	±% p.a.
1968	567	—
1975	551	−0.41%
1982	502	−1.32%
1990	467	−0.90%
1999	582	+2.48%
2007	678	+1.93%
2012	765	+2.44%
2017	765	+0.00%
2023	762	−0.07%
Source: INSEE

== See also ==
- Communes of the Bas-Rhin department
