= Rosenwiller =

- Commune
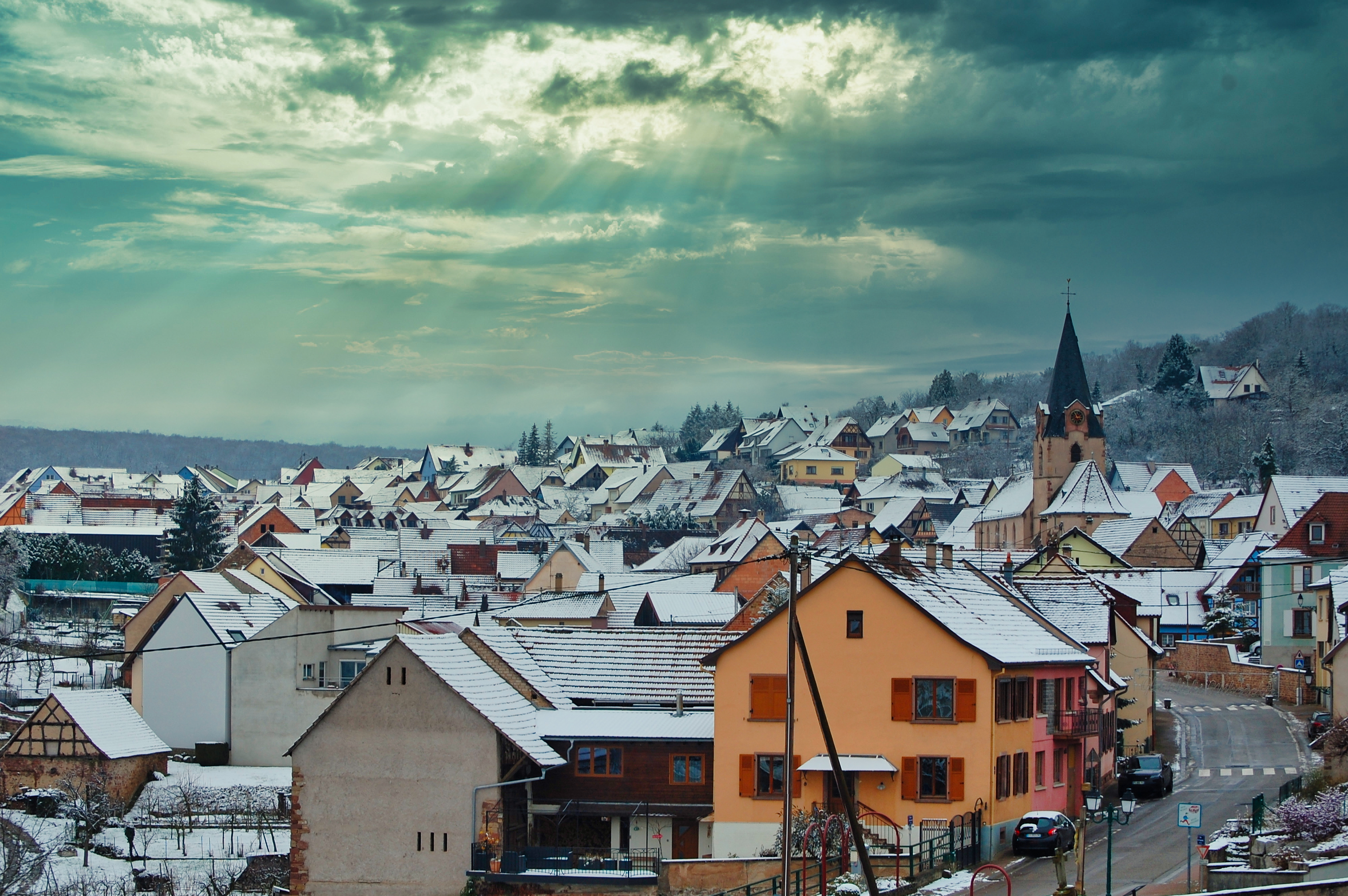
- View of Rosenwiller

- Coat of arms
- Location of Rosenwiller
- Location within France Location within Grand Est
- Coordinates: 48°30′23″N 7°26′25″E
- Country: France
- Region: Grand Est
- Department: Bas-Rhin
- Arrondissement: Molsheim
- Canton: Molsheim

Government
  - Mayor (2020–2026): Philippe Wantz
- Area^{1}: 5.50 km^{2} (2.12 sq mi)
- Highest elevation: 366 m (1,201 ft)
- Lowest elevation: 238 m (781 ft)
- Population (2023): 654
  - Density: 119/km^{2} (308/sq mi)
- Time zone: UTC+01:00 (CET)
  - Summer (DST): UTC+02:00 (CEST)
- INSEE/Postal code: 67410 /67560
- ^{1} French Land Register data, which excludes lakes, ponds, glaciers > 1 km^{2} (0.386 sq mi or 247 acres) and river estuaries.

Rosenwiller (French pronunciation: [ʁozənvillɛʁ]; German: Rosenweiler) is a commune in the Bas-Rhin department in Grand Est in north-eastern France.

== See also ==
- Communes of the Bas-Rhin department
