= Mollkirch =

Mollkirch Mollkìrich
- Commune
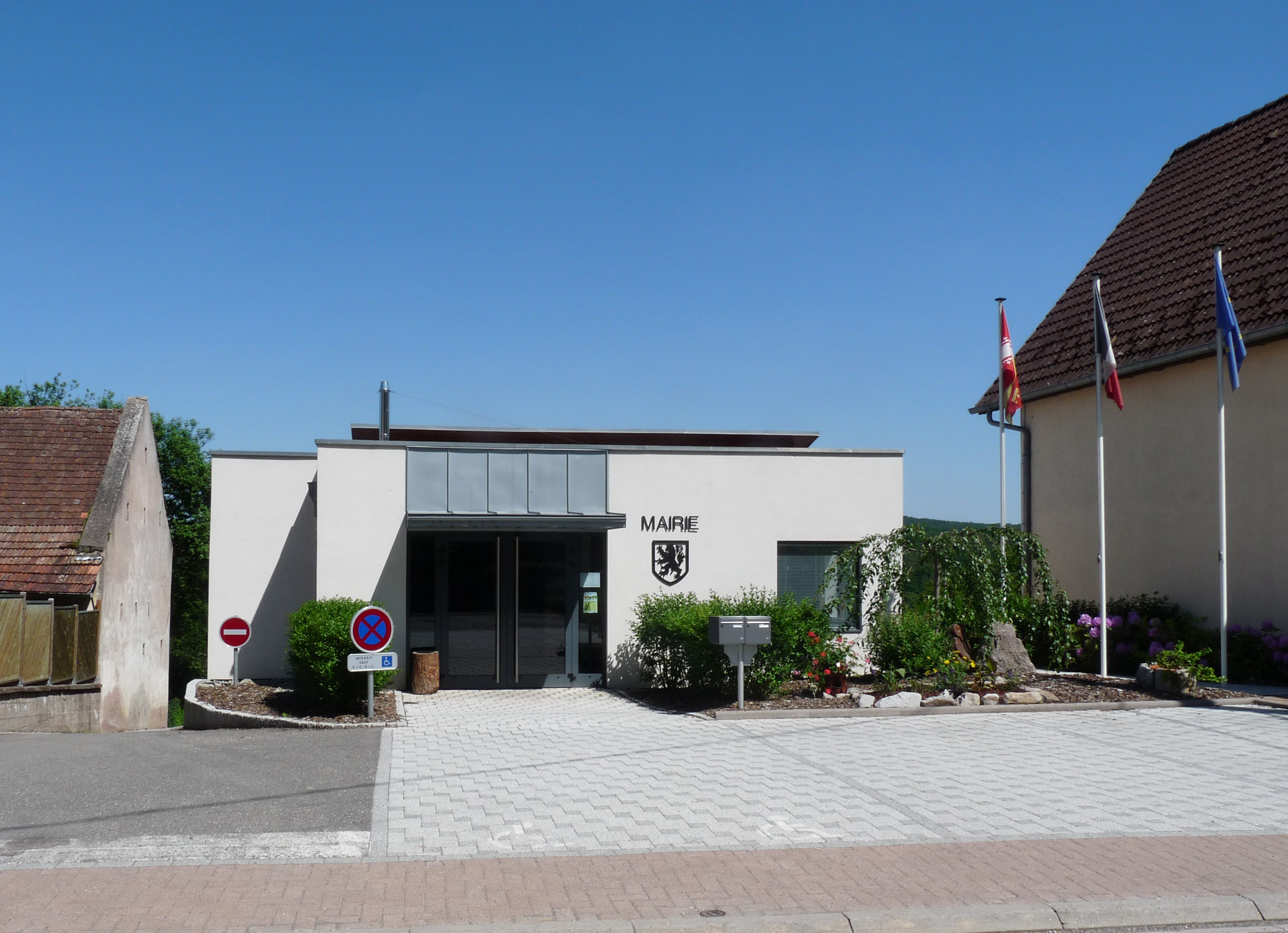
- The town hall in Mollkirch

- Coat of arms
- Location of Mollkirch
- Location within France Location within Grand Est
- Coordinates: 48°30′26″N 7°23′10″E
- Country: France
- Region: Grand Est
- Department: Bas-Rhin
- Arrondissement: Molsheim
- Canton: Molsheim

Government
  - Mayor (2020–2026): Mario Troestler
- Area^{1}: 12.47 km^{2} (4.81 sq mi)
- Highest elevation: 610 m (2,000 ft)
- Lowest elevation: 212 m (696 ft)
- Population (2023): 874
  - Density: 70.1/km^{2} (182/sq mi)
- Time zone: UTC+01:00 (CET)
  - Summer (DST): UTC+02:00 (CEST)
- INSEE/Postal code: 67299 /67190
- ^{1} French Land Register data, which excludes lakes, ponds, glaciers > 1 km^{2} (0.386 sq mi or 247 acres) and river estuaries.

Mollkirch (French pronunciation: [mɔlkiʁʃ]) is a commune in the Bas-Rhin department in Grand Est in north-eastern France.

== See also ==
- Communes of the Bas-Rhin department
