= Canton of Molsheim =

Coordinates: 48.54°N 7.49°E

- Canton
- Situation of the canton of Molsheim in the department of Bas-Rhin
- Country: France
- Region: Grand Est
- Department: Bas-Rhin
- No. of communes: {{{nbcomm}}}
- Population (2023): 56,854
- INSEE code: 6710

The canton of Molsheim is an administrative division of the Bas-Rhin department, northeastern France. Its borders were modified at the French canton reorganisation which came into effect in March 2015. Its seat is in Molsheim.

It consists of the following communes:

1. Altorf
2. Avolsheim
3. Bergbieten
4. Bischoffsheim
5. Bœrsch
6. Dachstein
7. Dahlenheim
8. Dangolsheim
9. Dorlisheim
10. Duppigheim
11. Duttlenheim
12. Ergersheim
13. Ernolsheim-Bruche
14. Flexbourg
15. Grendelbruch
16. Griesheim-près-Molsheim
17. Innenheim
18. Kirchheim
19. Marlenheim
20. Mollkirch
21. Molsheim
22. Nordheim
23. Odratzheim
24. Ottrott
25. Rosenwiller
26. Rosheim
27. Saint-Nabor
28. Scharrachbergheim-Irmstett
29. Soultz-les-Bains
30. Wangen
31. Wolxheim
