= Marlenheim =

- Commune
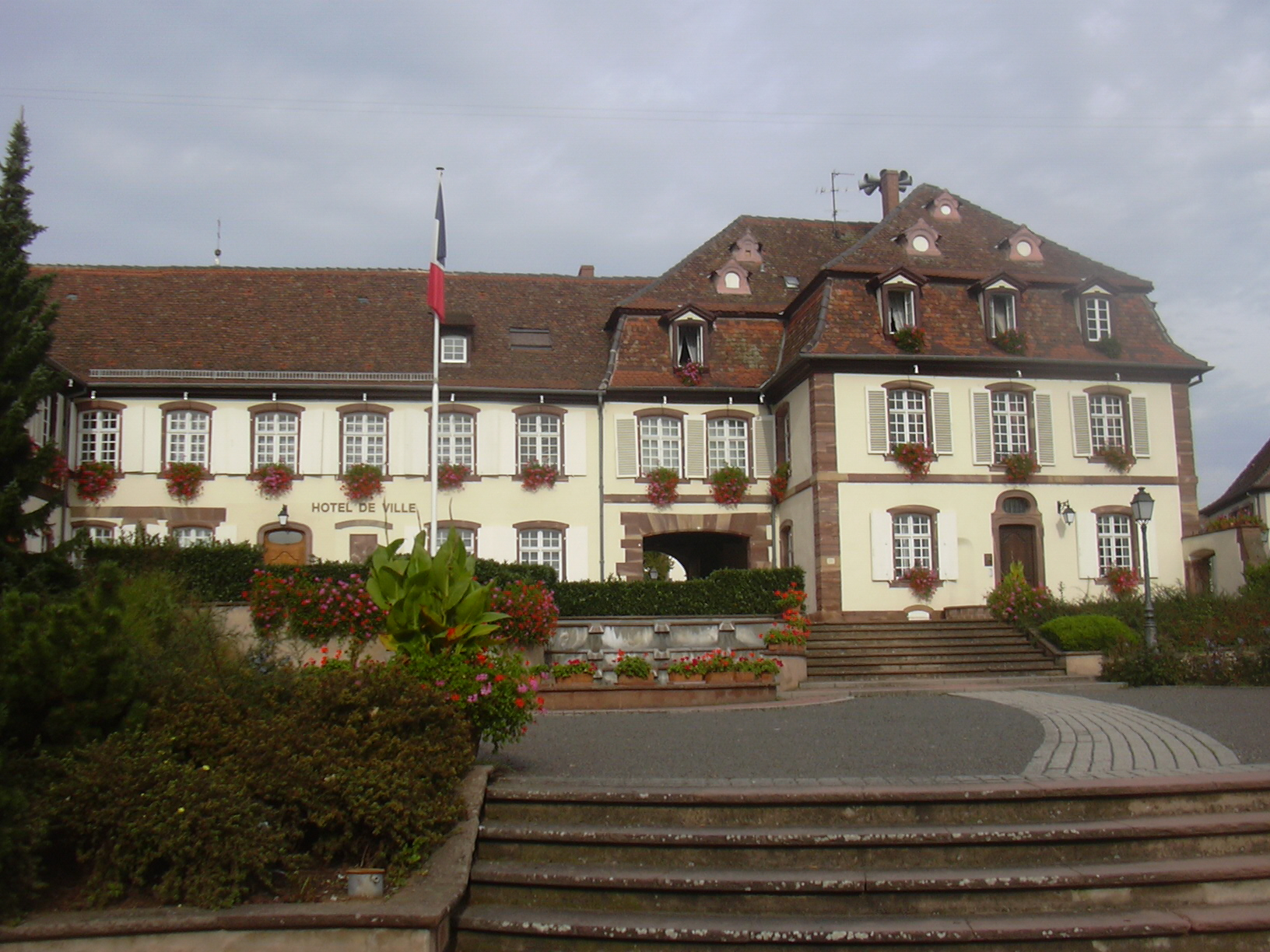
- The town hall in Marlenheim

- Coat of arms
- Location of Marlenheim
- Location within France Location within Grand Est
- Coordinates: 48°37′25″N 7°29′38″E
- Country: France
- Region: Grand Est
- Department: Bas-Rhin
- Arrondissement: Molsheim
- Canton: Molsheim
- Intercommunality: CC de la Mossig et du Vignoble

Government
  - Mayor (2020–2026): Daniel Fischer
- Area^{1}: 14.59 km^{2} (5.63 sq mi)
- Highest elevation: 365 m (1,198 ft)
- Lowest elevation: 175 m (574 ft)
- Population (2023): 4,185
  - Density: 286.8/km^{2} (742.9/sq mi)
- Time zone: UTC+01:00 (CET)
  - Summer (DST): UTC+02:00 (CEST)
- INSEE/Postal code: 67282 /67520
- ^{1} French Land Register data, which excludes lakes, ponds, glaciers > 1 km^{2} (0.386 sq mi or 247 acres) and river estuaries.

Marlenheim (French pronunciation: [maʁlənaim]) is a commune in the Bas-Rhin department and Grand Est region of north-eastern France.

== Population ==
Historical population
Year	Pop.	±% p.a.
1968	1,823	—
1975	2,287	+3.29%
1982	2,822	+3.05%
1990	2,956	+0.58%
1999	3,365	+1.45%
2007	3,493	+0.47%
2012	3,906	+2.26%
2017	4,250	+1.70%
2023	4,185	−0.26%
Source: INSEE

== Twin towns ==
Marlenheim is twinned with Bouillante (Guadeloupe, France).

== See also ==
- Communes of the Bas-Rhin department
