= Wangen, Bas-Rhin =

Wangen
- Commune
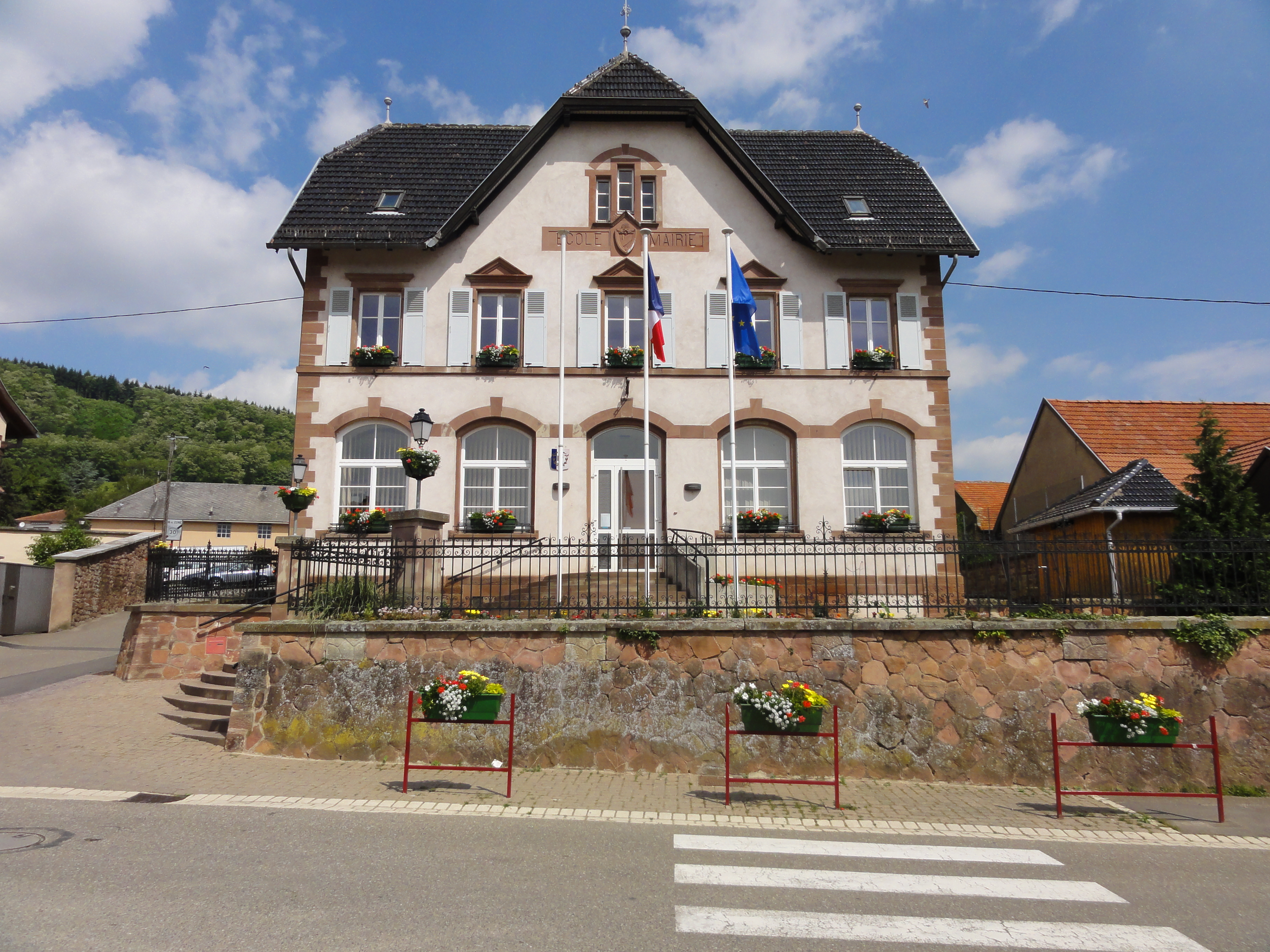
- The town hall in Wangen

- Coat of arms
- Location of Wangen
- Location within France Location within Grand Est
- Coordinates: 48°37′06″N 7°28′02″E
- Country: France
- Region: Grand Est
- Department: Bas-Rhin
- Arrondissement: Molsheim
- Canton: Molsheim
- Intercommunality: Mossig et Vignoble

Government
  - Mayor (2020–2026): Yves Jung
- Area^{1}: 3.87 km^{2} (1.49 sq mi)
- Elevation: 350 m (1,150 ft)
- Highest elevation: 400 m (1,300 ft)
- Lowest elevation: 176 m (577 ft)
- Population (2023): 639
  - Density: 165/km^{2} (428/sq mi)
- Time zone: UTC+01:00 (CET)
  - Summer (DST): UTC+02:00 (CEST)
- INSEE/Postal code: 67517 /67520
- ^{1} French Land Register data, which excludes lakes, ponds, glaciers > 1 km^{2} (0.386 sq mi or 247 acres) and river estuaries.

Wangen is a commune in the Bas-Rhin department in Grand Est in north-eastern France.

== Population ==
Historical population
Year	Pop.	±% p.a.
1968	570	—
1975	589	+0.47%
1982	572	−0.42%
1990	656	+1.73%
1999	704	+0.79%
2007	702	−0.04%
2012	715	+0.37%
2017	698	−0.48%
2023	639	−1.46%
Source: INSEE

== See also ==
- Communes of the Bas-Rhin department
