= Russ, Bas-Rhin =

Russ
- Commune
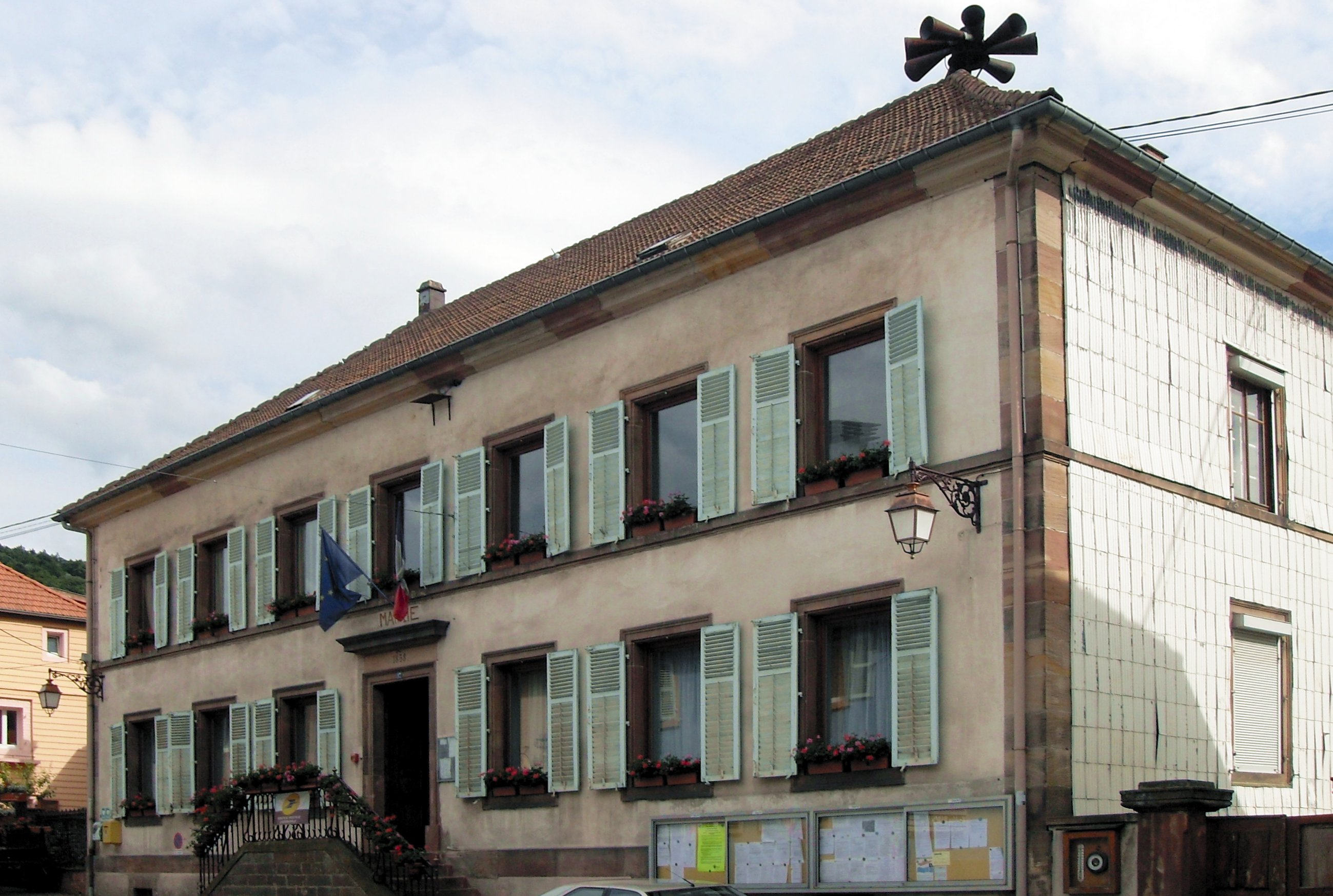
- The town hall in Russ

- Coat of arms
- Location of Russ
- Location within France Location within Grand Est
- Coordinates: 48°29′46″N 7°15′33″E
- Country: France
- Region: Grand Est
- Department: Bas-Rhin
- Arrondissement: Molsheim
- Canton: Mutzig

Government
  - Mayor (2020–2026): Marc Girold
- Area^{1}: 11.55 km^{2} (4.46 sq mi)
- Highest elevation: 850 m (2,790 ft)
- Lowest elevation: 265 m (869 ft)
- Population (2023): 1,228
  - Density: 106.3/km^{2} (275.4/sq mi)
- Time zone: UTC+01:00 (CET)
  - Summer (DST): UTC+02:00 (CEST)
- INSEE/Postal code: 67420 /67130
- ^{1} French Land Register data, which excludes lakes, ponds, glaciers > 1 km^{2} (0.386 sq mi or 247 acres) and river estuaries.

Russ (French pronunciation: [ʁys]) is a commune in the Bas-Rhin department in Grand Est in north-eastern France.

== See also ==
- Communes of the Bas-Rhin department
