= Scharrachbergheim-Irmstett =

- Commune
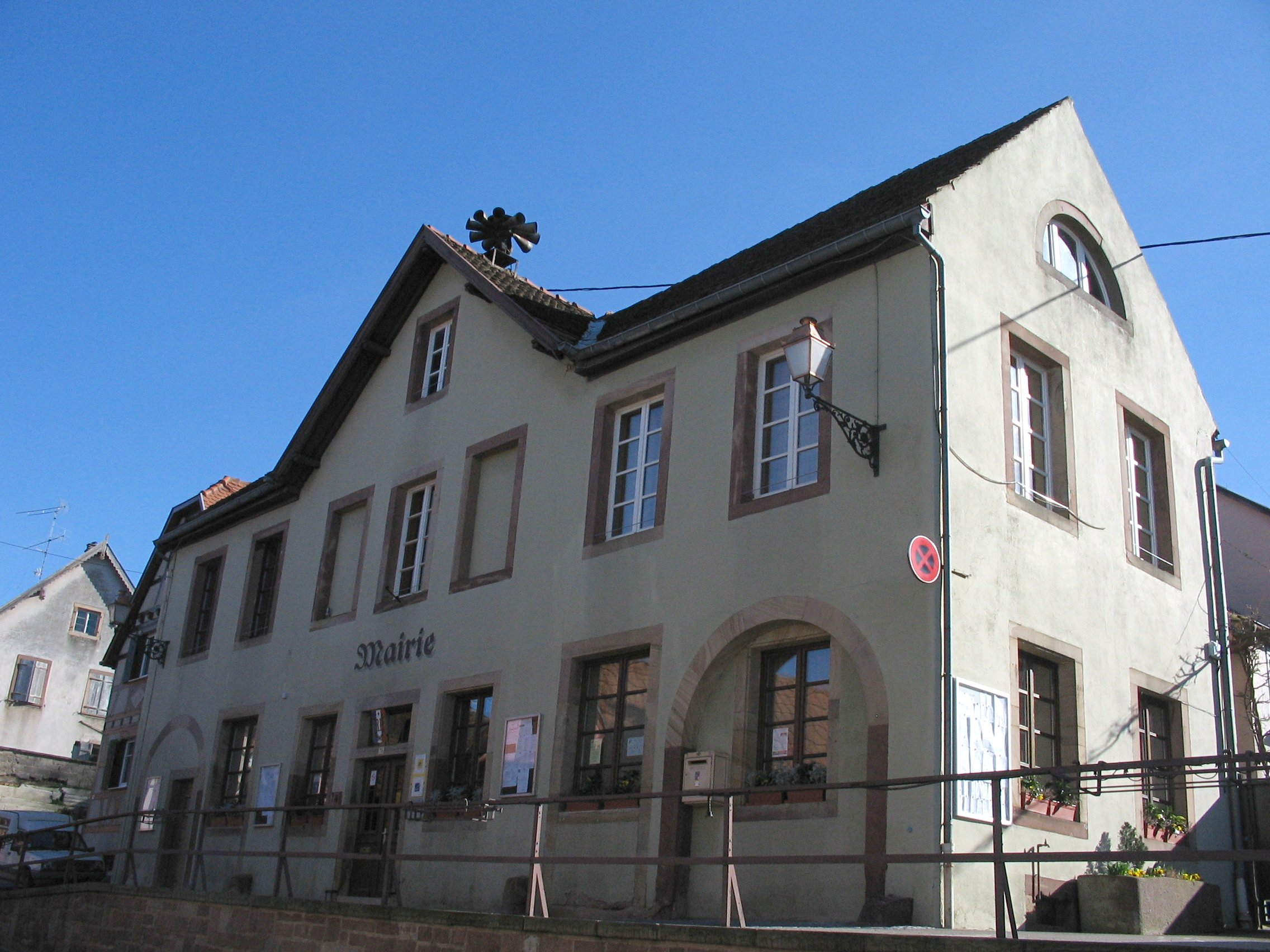
- The town hall in Scharrachbergheim

- Coat of arms
- Location of Scharrachbergheim-Irmstett
- Location within France Location within Grand Est
- Coordinates: 48°35′39″N 7°29′41″E
- Country: France
- Region: Grand Est
- Department: Bas-Rhin
- Arrondissement: Molsheim
- Canton: Molsheim

Government
  - Mayor (2020–2026): Sylvie Tholé
- Area^{1}: 3.22 km^{2} (1.24 sq mi)
- Highest elevation: 316 m (1,037 ft)
- Lowest elevation: 172 m (564 ft)
- Population (2023): 1,359
  - Density: 422/km^{2} (1,090/sq mi)
- Time zone: UTC+01:00 (CET)
  - Summer (DST): UTC+02:00 (CEST)
- INSEE/Postal code: 67442 /67310
- ^{1} French Land Register data, which excludes lakes, ponds, glaciers > 1 km^{2} (0.386 sq mi or 247 acres) and river estuaries.

Scharrachbergheim-Irmstett is a commune in the Bas-Rhin department in Grand Est in north-eastern France.

== See also ==
- Communes of the Bas-Rhin department
