= Innenheim =

French commune in Bas-Rhin, Alsace, France

Innenheim Ínnle
- Commune
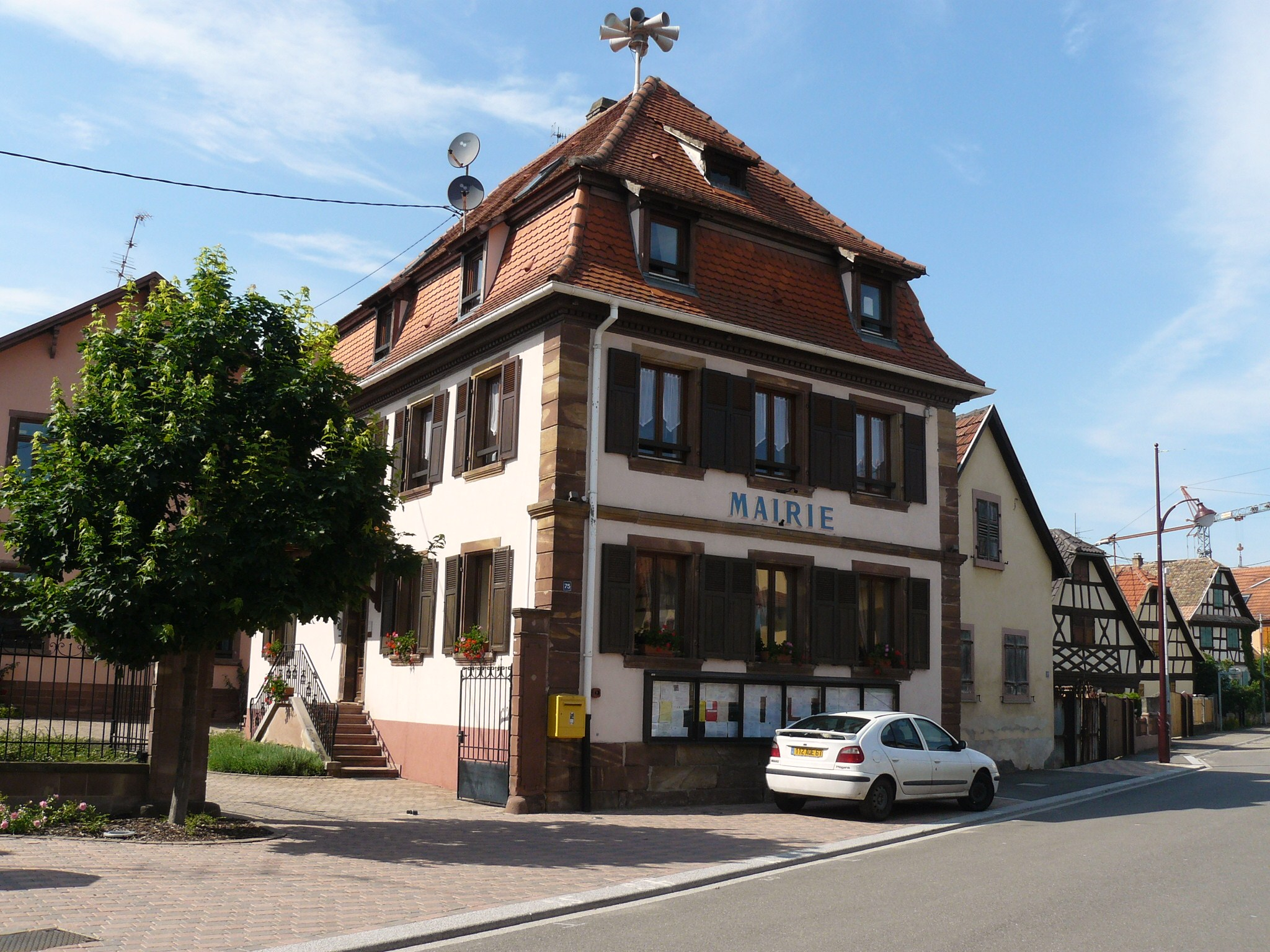
- The town hall in Innenheim

- Coat of arms
- Location of Innenheim
- Location within France Location within Grand Est
- Coordinates: 48°29′46″N 7°34′23″E
- Country: France
- Region: Grand Est
- Department: Bas-Rhin
- Arrondissement: Sélestat-Erstein
- Canton: Molsheim
- Intercommunality: Pays de Sainte-Odile

Government
  - Mayor (2020–2026): Jean-Claude Jully
- Area^{1}: 6.24 km^{2} (2.41 sq mi)
- Highest elevation: 182 m (597 ft)
- Lowest elevation: 148 m (486 ft)
- Population (2023): 1,288
  - Density: 206/km^{2} (535/sq mi)
- Time zone: UTC+01:00 (CET)
  - Summer (DST): UTC+02:00 (CEST)
- INSEE/Postal code: 67223 /67880
- ^{1} French Land Register data, which excludes lakes, ponds, glaciers > 1 km^{2} (0.386 sq mi or 247 acres) and river estuaries.

Innenheim (French pronunciation: [inənaim]; Alsatian: Ìnnle) is a commune in the Bas-Rhin department in Alsace in north-eastern France.

Among speakers of the local language, the village is often called "Enle" or "Inle" according to the speaker's accent. The suffix "..le" is an Alsatian affectionate diminutive, and equivalent to "..lein" in modern high German.

== Geography ==
The village is positioned between Strasbourg and Obernai. To the north-west of the commune there is an access junction with the principal north–south autoroute in Alsace, the Autoroute A35.

The economy is based on small traders and agriculture.

== Landmarks ==
The wolf chapel (La chapelle du loup).

== See also ==
- Communes of the Bas-Rhin department
