= Bœrsch =

Bœrsch Bersch
- Commune
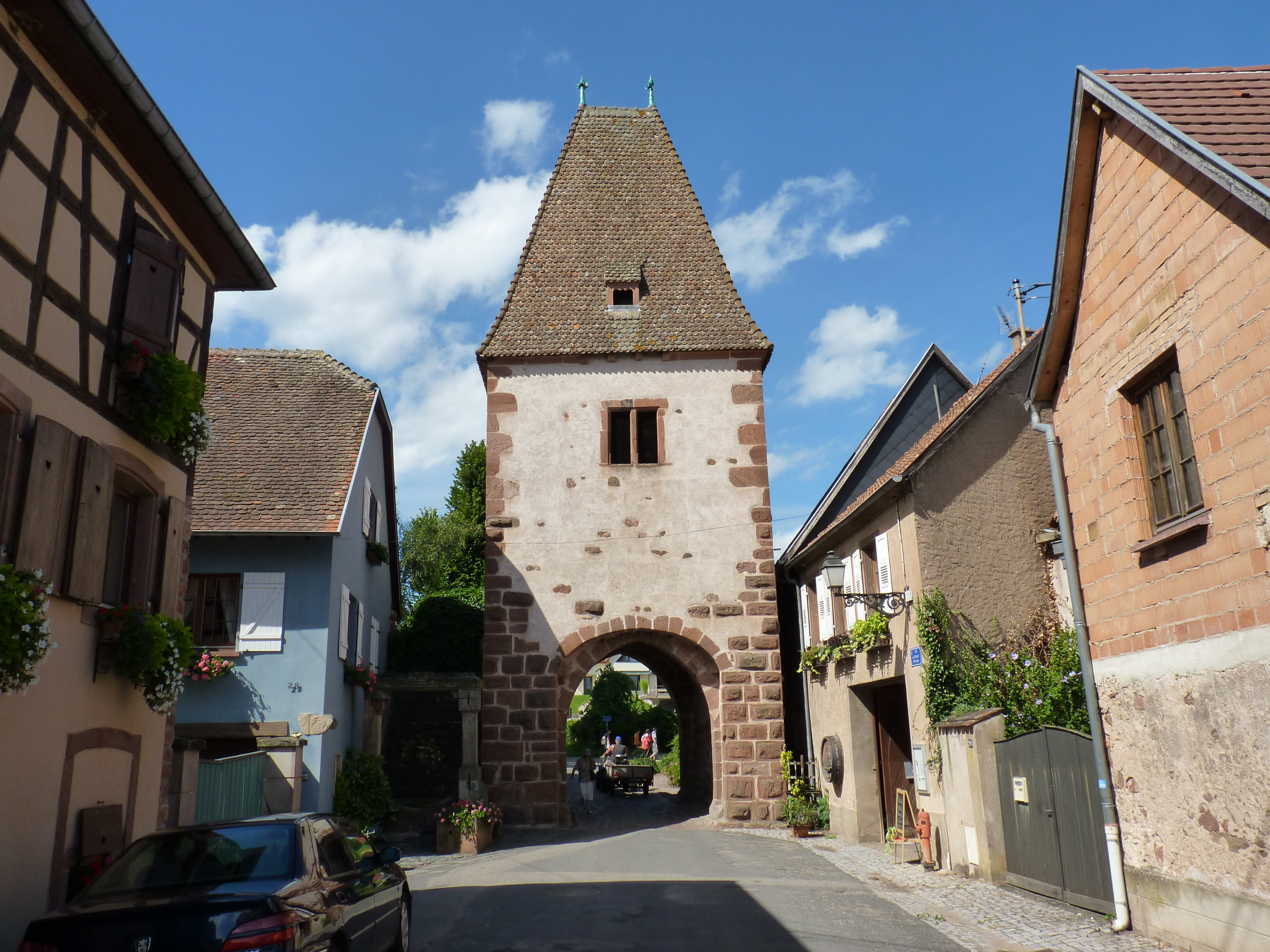
- The tower in Bœrsch

- Coat of arms
- Location of Bœrsch
- Location within France Location within Grand Est
- Coordinates: 48°28′40″N 7°26′30″E
- Country: France
- Region: Grand Est
- Department: Bas-Rhin
- Arrondissement: Molsheim
- Canton: Molsheim

Government
  - Mayor (2020–2026): Colette Jung
- Area^{1}: 23.35 km^{2} (9.02 sq mi)
- Highest elevation: 787 m (2,582 ft)
- Lowest elevation: 211 m (692 ft)
- Population (2023): 2,459
  - Density: 105.3/km^{2} (272.8/sq mi)
- Time zone: UTC+01:00 (CET)
  - Summer (DST): UTC+02:00 (CEST)
- INSEE/Postal code: 67052 /67530
- ^{1} French Land Register data, which excludes lakes, ponds, glaciers > 1 km^{2} (0.386 sq mi or 247 acres) and river estuaries.

Bœrsch (French pronunciation: [bœʁʃ]; German: Börsch) is a commune in the Bas-Rhin department in Grand Est in north-eastern France.

== Population ==
Historical population
Year	Pop.	±% p.a.
1968	1,154	—
1975	1,407	+2.87%
1982	1,663	+2.42%
1990	1,892	+1.63%
1999	2,107	+1.20%
2007	2,369	+1.48%
2012	2,420	+0.43%
2017	2,437	+0.14%
2023	2,459	+0.15%
Source: INSEE

== Notable person ==
- Charles Spindler

== See also ==
- Communes of the Bas-Rhin department
