= German place names in Alsace =

Below is a list of the historic German language exonyms for towns and village in the Alsace region of France (German: Elsaß) used prior to the annexation of the region by France during the reign of King Louis XIV in 1681 and again from 1870 to 1918 and from 1940 to 1945, when Alsace was re-annexed to Germany. Alsatian names used since the 6th century differ.

This list includes only names that differ significantly; the list of minor spelling differences, such as Zutzendorf/Zützendorf is incomplete. Included are names where the sole difference is -weiler instead of -willer, e.g. Dettwiller (French)/Dettweiler (German).

French	German	note
Albé	Erlenbach	"alder creek"
Altorf	Altdorf (bei Molsheim)	"Old village"
Ammerschwihr	Ammerschweier	
Appenwihr	Appenweier	
Artzenheim	Arzenheim	
Aspach-le-Bas	Nieder Aspach	"Lower Aspach"
Aspach-le-Haut	Ober Aspach	"Upper Aspach"
Aubure	Altweier	"Old village"
Barembach	Barenbach	either "bear creek" or "barren creek"
Bellefosse	Schöngrund	"beautiful pit"
Bellemagny	Baronsweiler	
Belmont	Schönenberg im Breuschtal	"beautiful mountain"
Bennwihr	Bennweier	
Berentzwiller	Berenzweiler	
Bernardvillé	Bernhardsweiler	
Bischtroff-sur-Sarre	Bischdorf a.d. Saar	
Bischwihr	Bischweier	
Blancherupt	Bliensbach	
Bourbach-le-Bas	Nieder Burbach	"lower Burbach"
Bourbach-le-Haut	Ober Burbach	"upper Burbach"
Bourg	Burg	"Castle"
Bourg-Bruche	Breuschburg	
Bourgheim	Burgheim	"Castle village"
Bourtzwiller	Burzweiler	
Bouxwiller	Buchsweiler	"Book village"
Bréchaumont	Brückensweiler	
Bruebach	Brubach	
Burnhaupt-le-Bas	Nieder Burnhaupt	
Burnhaupt-le-Haut	Ober Burnhaupt	
Cernay	Sennheim	
Chalampé	Eichwald	"oak forest"
Champenay	Kampenheim	
Charbes	Mittelscher	
Châtenois	Kestenholz	"chestnut woods"
Cleebourg	Kleeburg	
Climbach	Klimbach	
Climont	Weinberg	"vineyard"
Colroy-la-Roche	Kolrein	
Cosswiller	Koßweiler	
Courtavon	Ottendorf (Elsass)	
Crastatt	Krastatt	
Croettwiller	Kröttweiler	
Cronenbourg	Kronenburg	"Crown’s castle"
Dannemarie	Dammerkirch	"Lady’s church" in reference to the Virgin Mary
Dieffenbach-au-Val	Diefenbach im Tal	
Eberbach-Seltz	Unknown	
Eguisheim	Egisheim	
Ehnwihr	Ehnweier	
Eichhoffen	Eichhofen	
Eschbourg	Eschburg	
Eteimbes	Welschsteinbach	"Frenchman’s stone brook"
Ferrette	Pfirt	
Flaxlanden	Flachslanden	
Flexbourg	Flexburg	
Folgensbourg	Folgensburg	
Fort-Louis	Ludwigsfeste	
Fortschwihr	Fortschweier	
Fouchy	Grube	
Fouday	Urbach a.d. Breusch	
Frankenbourg	Frankenburg	
Fréland	Urbach (bei Kayersberg)	
Fulleren	Füllern	
Galfingue	Galfingen	
Gensbourg	Gensburg	
Giragoutte	???	
Gottenhouse	Gottenhausen	"God’s houses"
Grand Rombach	Groß Rumbach	
Grandfontaine	Michelbrunn	"Michael springs/well"
Gueberschwihr	Geberschweier	
Guebwiller	Gebweiler	
Guémar	Gemar	
Guevenatten	Gewenatten	
Guewenheim	Gewenheim	
Gumbrechtshoffen	Gumbrechtshofen	
Gundershoffen	Gundernshofen	
Harthouse	Harthausen	
Haut-Andlau	Ober Andlau	
Hésingue	Häsingen	
Hinsbourg	Hinsburg	
Hirsingue	Hirsingen	
Holtzwihr	Holzweier	"Woods’ village"
Hombourg	Homburg	
Horbourg	Horburg	
Hunawihr	Hunaweier	
Huningue	Hüningen	
Husseren-Châteaux	Häusern b. Colmar	"Houses near Colmar"
Husseren-Wesserling	Hüsseren-Wesserling	
Huttingue	Hüttingen	"Village of the huts"
Isenbourg	Isenburg	
Kaltenhouse	Kaltenhausen	"Cold houses"
Kembs-Loechlé	Kembs-Löchle	
Kientzvillé	Kienzweiler	
Knoeringue	Knöringen	
Koenigsbruck	Königsbrück	
Koetzingue	Kötzingen	
Kurtzenhouse	Kurzenhausen	
La Hoube	Hub	
La Petite-Lièpvre	Klein Leberau	
La Petite-Pierre	Lützelstein	"Lucelle stone"
La Robersau	Rupprechtsau	
La Vancelle	Wanzel	
La Wantzenau	Wanzenau	
Labaroche	Zell	
Lalaye	Lach	
Lapoutroie	Schnierlach	
Lauterbourg	Lauterburg	"Clear castle"
Lauw	Aue	
Le Bonhomme	Diedolshausen	
Les Quatres-Vents	Vierwinden	
Les Trois-Épis	Dreiähren	
Levoncourt	Luffendorf	
Leymen	Leimen	
Lièpvre	Leberau	
Ligsdorf	Lüxdorf	
Lucelle	Lützel (Elsaß)	
Lutzelhouse	Lützelhausen	"Lucelle houses"
Magny	Manningen	
Maisonsgoutte	Meisengott	
Marmoutier	Maursmünster	"Maur’s minster"
Marxenhouse	Marxenhausen	
Masevaux	Masmünster	
Mittelwihr	Mittelweier	"Middle village"
Montreux-Jeune	Jung Münsterol	
Montreux-Vieux	Alt Münsterol	
Mont-St-Odilie	St. Odilienberg	"St. Odile’s mountain"
Mooslargue	Mooslarg	
Morsbronn-lès-Bains	Bad Morsbronn	
Moulin-Neuf	Neumühle	"New mills"
Mulhouse	Mülhausen im Elsaß	"Mill houses"
Munchhouse	Münchhausen	"Monks’ houses"
Mutzenhouse	Mützenhausen	
Neubois	Gereuth	
Neubourg	Neuburg	"New castle"
Neuf-Brisach	Neu Breisach	
Neunhoffen	Neunhofen	Either "nine courtyards" or "new courtyards"
Nideraltdorf	Niederaltdorf	"Lower old village"
Niederbronn-les-Bains	Bad Niederbronn	"Lower springs bath"
Niedermorschwihr	Niedermorschweier	
Niedernai	Nieder Ehnheim	
Nordhouse	Nordhausen	"North houses"
Obermorschwihr	Obermorschweier	
Obermorschwiller	Obermorschweiler	
Obernai	Ober Ehnheim	
Oderen	Odern	
Oelenberg-Couvent	Kloster Ölenberg	
Oltingue	Oltingen	
Orbey	Urbeis (bei Kaysersberg)	
Orschwihr	Orschweier	
Orschwiller	Orschweiler	
Ortenbourg	Ortenburg	"Castle of the villages"
Osthoffen	Osthofen	"East courtyards"
Osthouse	Osthausen	"East houses"
Petit-Haut	Kleine Höhe	"Little height"
Petit-Landau	Klein Landau	"Little land on the floodplain/meadow"
Petit-Wingen	Klein Wingen	
Petit-Wisches	Klein Wisch	
Pfaffenhoffen	Pfaffenhofen	"Priests’ courtyards "
Pfetterhouse	Pfetterhausen	
Plaine	Blen	
Plobsheim	Plombsheim	
Poutay	???	
Ranrupt	Roggensbach	
Réguisheim	Regisheim	
Reichshoffen	Reichshofen	Either "empire’s courtyards" or "rich courtyards"
Reiningue	Reiningen	
Remomont	???	
Rhinau	Rheinau	
Ribeaupierre	Rappoltstein	
Ribeauvillé	Rappoltsweiler	
Riedwihr	Reidweier	
Riquewihr	Reichenweier	
Roggenhouse	Roggenhausen	
Romagny	Willern	
Rombach-le-Franc	Deutsch Rumbach	
Rorschwihr	Rorschweier	
Saales	Saal	
Saint-André	St. Andreas	
Saint-Bernard	St. Bernhard	
Saint-Blaise-la-Roche	St. Basien (bei Rappoltsweiler)	
Saint-Blaise-aux-Mines	St. Blasius (bei Altkirch)	
Saint-Cosme	St. Cosman	
Sainte-Croix-aux-Mines	St. Kreuz	"Saint Cross"
Sainte-Croix-en-Plaine	Heiligkreuz bei Colmar	"Holy Cross near Colmar"
Sainte-Marie-aux-Mines	Markirch	"Mary’s church"
Saint-Gall	St. Gallen	
St-Hippolyte	St. Pilt	
Saint-Jean-Saverne	St. Johann bei Zabern	
Saint-Leonard	St. Leonhard	
Saint-Louis	St. Ludwig (bei Basel)	
Saint-Materne	???	
Saint-Maurice	St. Moritz	
Saint-Pierre	St. Peter	
Saint-Pierre-Bois	St. Petersholz	
Saint-Pierre-sur-l'Hâte	St. Peter	
Saint-Sébastien	St. Sebastian	
Sarre-Union	Saarunion	
Sarrewerden	Saarwerden	
Saulxures	Salzern	
Saverne	Zabern	
Schaffhouse-près-Seltz	Schaffhausen bei Selz	"Sheephouses near Selz"
Schaffhouse-sur-Zorn	Schaffhausen a.d. Zorn	"Sheephouses on the Zorn"
Schirmeck-la-Broque	Schirmeck-Vorbruck	
Schoppenwihr	Schoppenweier	
Schweighouse	Schweighausen	
Schweighouse-sur-Moder	Schweighausen a.d. Moder	
Schweighouse-Thann	Schweighausen b. Thann	
Sélestat	Schlettstadt	
Seppois-le-Bas	Nieder Sept	
Seppois-le-Haut	Ober Sept	
Soppe-le-Bas	Nieder Sulzbach	
Soppe-le-Haut	Ober Sulzbach	
Soultzeren	Sulzern	
Soultz-sous-Forêts	Sulz unterm Wald	"Salt springs beneath the woods"
Storckensohn	Storchensohn	"Stork’s son"
Strasbourg	Straßburg (Elsaß)	"Castle of the streets"
Sundhoffen	Sündhofen	"Southern courtyards"
Sundhouse	Sundhausen	"Southern houses"
Surbourg	Surburg	
Thanvillé	Thannweiler	
Valdieu-Lutran	Gottesthal-Luttan	
Vieux-Ferrette	Alt Pfirt	"Old Ferrette"
Vieux-Thann	Alt Thann	"Old Thann"
Village-Neuf	Neudorf b. Hüningen	"New village near Huningue"
Villé	Weiler	"Village"
Villeneuve	Neudorf	"new village"
Werentzhouse	Werenzhausen	
Westhoffen	Westhofen	"Western courtyards"
Westhouse	Westhausen	"Western houses"
Westhouse-lès-Marmoutier	Westhausen b. Maursmünster	"West Houses near Maur’s minster"
Wickerschwihr	Wickerschweier	
Wihr-au-Val	Weier im Tal	"Village in the valley"
Wihr-en-Plaine	Weier (bei Colmar)	"Village near Colmar"
Winterhouse	Wintershausen	"Winter houses"
Wisches	Wisch	
Wissembourg	Weißenburg (Elsaß)	"White castle"
Wœrth (Woerth)	Wörth (Woerth)	"Worth"
Zaessingue	Zässingen	

== See also ==
- Alsace
- German exonyms
- List of European exonyms
