= Unterelsaß =

Historical region of eastern France in German empire

Coordinates: 48°40′N 7°35′E

District of Lower Alsace Bezirk Unterelsaß (in German)
- District of Alsace–Lorraine
- 1871–1918
- Flag Coat of arms

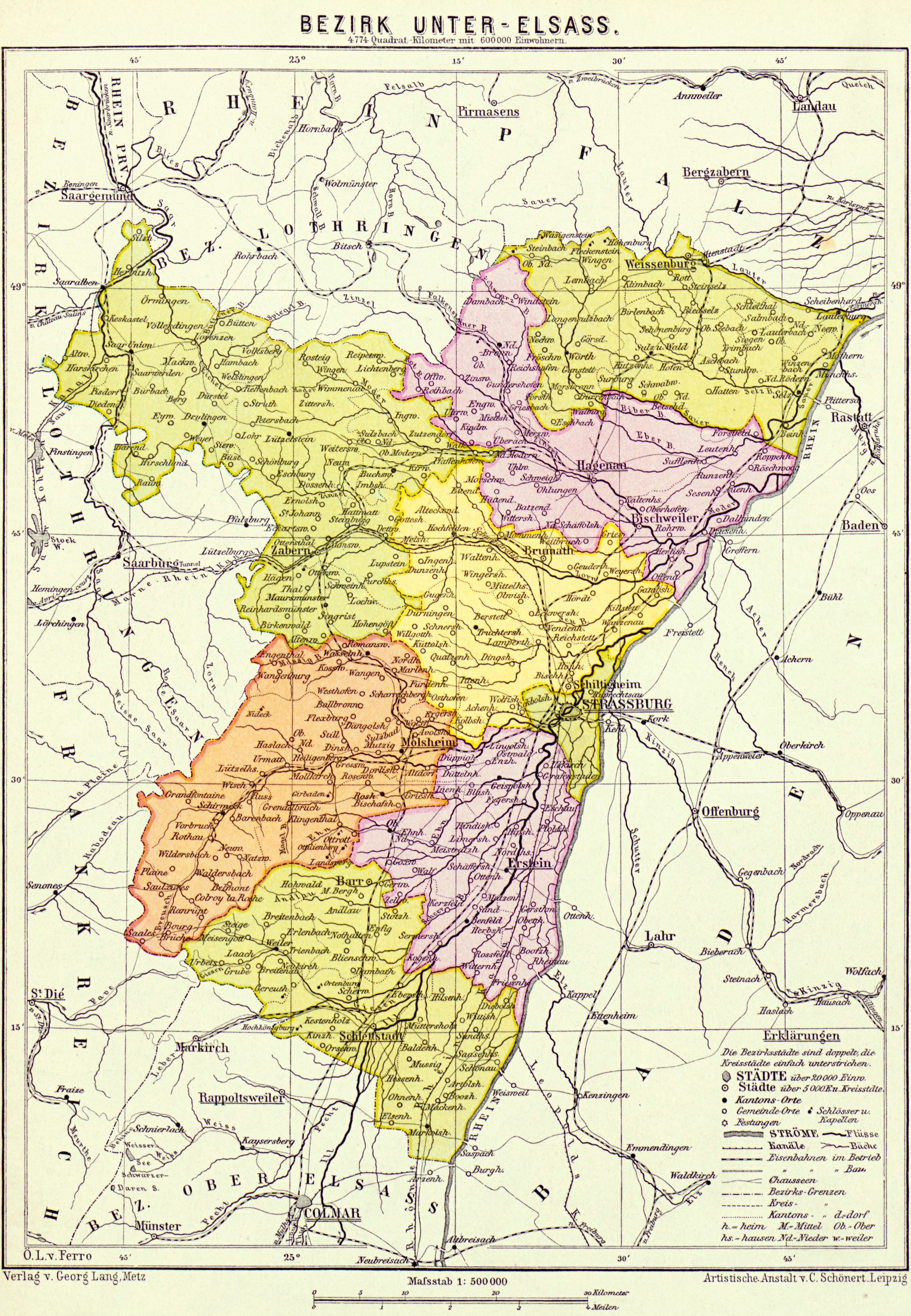
- Lower Alsace district with its subdistricts in different colours (1890)
- Capital: Straßburg
- Area
  - 1886: 4.774 km^{2} (1.843 sq mi)
- Population
  - 1886: 612.078
- History
  - Franco-Prussian War: 1870–1871
  - Established: 1871
  - Disestablished: 1918
- Political subdivisions: 8 rural districts 1 urban district (Strasbourg)
Preceded by	Succeeded by
Bas-Rhin; Vosges (department)	Bas-Rhin
- Today part of: France

Lower Alsace (German: Unterelsaß, also spelled Unterelsass; French: Basse-Alsace) was the northern part of the historical region Alsace. From 1871 to 1918, Bezirk Unterelsaß was the name for the central district (Bezirk) of the imperial territory of Alsace–Lorraine in the German Empire.

== Administrative and political organization ==
According to the census 1886 the district of Lower Alsace comprised:

- 8 subdistricts ("Kreise")
- 31 cantons
- 560 municipalities
- area 4.774 square kilometres (1.843 mi^{2})
- 612.078 inhabitants (Males 299.456 Females 312.622)
- Catholics 381.748 Protestants 209.199 Jews 19.848 Other faiths 1.220

=== Capital and subdistricts ===
The capital of the district was Straßburg. There were the 8 subdistricts ("Kreise") of

1. Erstein
2. Hagenau (Haguenau)
3. Molsheim
4. Schlettstadt (Sélestat)
5. Straßburg, Land (county of Straßburg) (Strasbourg)
6. Weißenburg (Wissembourg)
7. Zabern (Saverne)
8. Stadtkreis Straßburg

=== The official flag ===
The flag is a white bar in a red field decorated on each side with a white lace motif. The union of this flag with that of Oberelsaß forms the flag of modern Alsace.

== Annexed municipalities from the neighbor department ==
The district of Unterelsaß corresponds exactly to the current département of Bas-Rhin, but not to the Alsatian territory before 1870. Under the terms of a particular agreement that was signed in Berlin July 21, 1871, and in Paris July 31, 1871, 18 municipalities of the Vosges department were integrated into the new imperial district of Lower Alsace, subdistrict of Molsheim, canton of Schirmeck.

1. Barembach
2. Bourg-Bruche
3. La Broque
4. Colroy-la-Roche
5. Grandfontaine
6. Natzvillers
7. Neuviller-la-Roche
8. Plaine
9. Ranrupt
10. Rothau
11. Russ
12. Saales
13. Saint-Blaise-la-Roche
14. Saulxures
15. Schirmeck
16. Waldersbach
17. Wildersbach
18. Wisches

In earlier times Rothau, Wildersbach, Waldersbach, Neuvillers belonged to the principality of Ban de la Roche before they joined the département of the Vosges in 1790. The other ones were located in the former Duchy of Lorraine.

The inhabitants of these municipalities didn't and still don't speak any German dialect (Lower Alemannic) such as their neighbors. The linguistic boundary runs between Wisches and Lutzelhouse. The people of the annexed towns speaks a Romance language from the Langues d'oïl, Lorraine family, such as some municipalities in the district of Upper Alsace. This cultural particularity stresses the fact that the annexation of French territories by the German Empire not always referred to the pan-nationalist political idea (Pan-Germanism trying to unite all German-speaking people. When Alsace was recovered by France in 1919 it was decided not to return the 18 annexed municipalities to their former Department(Vosges). Thus in terms of departmental boundaries, the mountain region remains administratively separated from the western portion of the Vosges mountains. Nowadays the inhabitants of the Bruche valley basically identify themselves with Lower Alsatians regardless of their cultural identity.

== First German federal elections 1874 ==
The subjects of the Reichsland Alsace-Lorraine could exercise their right to vote for the deputies at the Reichtstag in Berlin February 1, 1874. Among ten deputies for Alsace, six were catholic clerics and most of the deputies belonged to the French protest party.

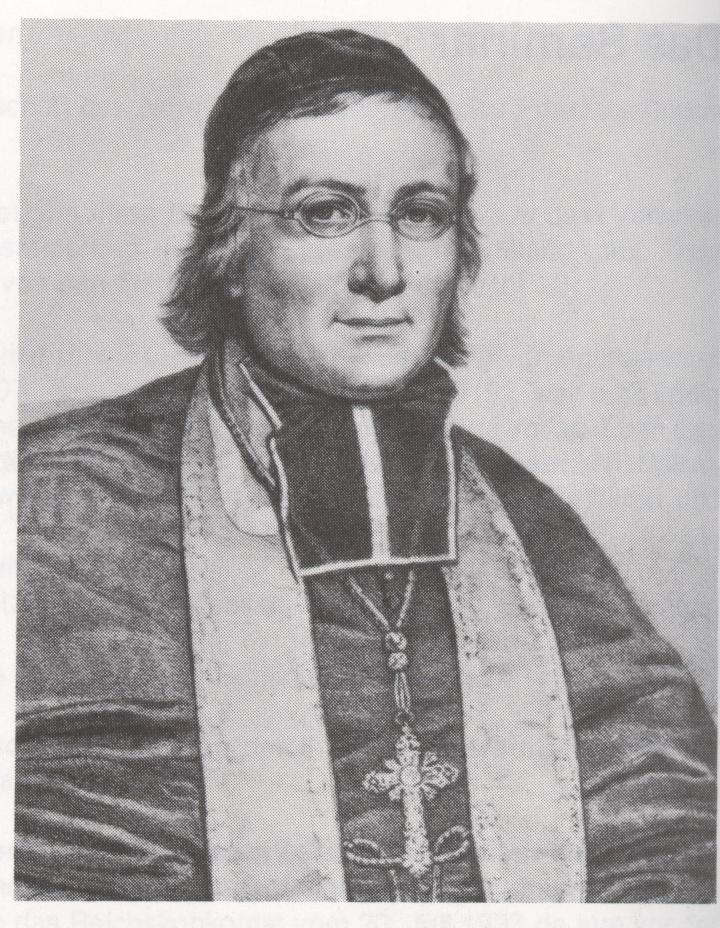
Andreas Räß (André Raess), Bishop of Straßburg

The name of the deputies for Lower Alsace were as follows:

- Hartmann, Ludwig, factory owner, WK Elsaß-Lothringen 10 (Hagenau, Weißenburg), Elsaß-Lothringer
- Lauth, Ernest, mayor of Strasbourg, WK Elsaß-Lothringen 8 (Straßburg), Französische Protestpartei
- Philippi, Joseph, priest, WK Elsaß-Lothringen 7 (Molsheim, Erstein), Elsaß-Lothringer
- Räß, Andreas, bishop of Strasbourg, WK Elsaß-Lothringen 6 (Schlettstadt), Elsaß-Lothringer
- Schauenburg, Alexis von, landowner, WK Elsaß-Lothringen 9 (Straßburg-Land), Elsaß-Lothringer
- Teutsch, Eduard, landowner, WK Elsaß-Lothringen 11 (Zabern), Französische Protestpartei

== Third German federal election, 1877 ==
In the third election of January 10, 1877, the Alsatians of the District Lower Alsace elected the following deputies:

- Gustav Adolf Bergmann, Straßburg-Stadt Els.-Lothringer
- Louis Heckmann-Stintzy, Schlettstadt Els.-Lothringer
- Xaver Joseph Nessel, Hagenau, Weißenburg Els.-Lothringer
- Jean North, Straßburg-Land Els.-Lothringer
- Achille Rack Molsheim, Erstein Els.-Lothringer
- Carl August Schneegans, Zabern Els.-Lothringer

== Fourth German federal election, July 30, 1878 ==
The Lower Alsatian deputies for the next legislative period 1878-1881 are as follows:

- Goldenberg, Alfred, factory owner, WK Elsaß-Lothringen 11 (Zabern), Elsaß-Lothringer
- Heckmann-Stintzy, Louis, WK Elsaß-Lothringen 6 (Schlettstadt), Elsaß-Lothringer
- Kable, Jacques, director of an insurance company, WK Elsaß-Lothringen 8 (Straßburg), Elsaß-Lothringer
- Rack, Achille, Mayor of Benfeld, WK Elsaß-Lothringen 7 (Molsheim, Erstein), Elsaß-Lothringer
- Schmitt-Batiston, Alfred, land owner, WK Elsaß-Lothringen 10 (Hagenau, Weißenburg), Elsaß-Lothringer
- Schneegans, Carl August, Director of Elsässer Journal, WK Elsaß-Lothringen 11 (Zabern), Elsaß-Lothringer

== Fifth German federal elections 1881 ==
The elections for the fifth legislative period (1881-1884) of the Imperial Diet took place October 27, 1881. These are the results of the elections for Lower Alsace:

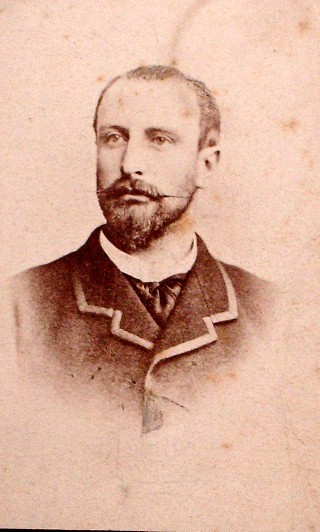
Hugo Zorn von Bulach, Alsatian deputy

- Dietrich, Eugéne de, ironmaster, WK Elsaß-Lothringen 10 (Hagenau, Weißenburg), Elsaß-Lothringer
- Goldenberg, Alfred, factory-owner, WK Elsaß-Lothringen 11 (Zabern), Elsaß-Lothringer
- Kablé, Jacques, director of an insurance company, WK Elsaß-Lothringen 8 (Straßburg-Stadt), Elsaß-Lothringer
- Lang, Irénée, manufacturer, WK Elsaß-Lothringen 6 (Schlettstadt), Zentrum
- Quirin, Michael, landowner, WK Elsaß-Lothringen 9 (Straßburg-Land), Elsaß-Lothringer
- Zorn von Bulach, Hugo, WK Elsaß-Lothringen 7 (Molsheim, Erstein), Elsaß-Lothringer

== See also ==
- Bas-Rhin
- Alsace-Lorraine

== Sources ==
=== For the federal elections ===
- Georg Hirth (Hrsg.): Deutscher Parlamentsalmanach 13. Ausgabe, September 1878. Leipzig, 1878 (Digitalisat)
- Stenographische Berichte über die Verhandlungen des Deutschen Reichstags. 4. Legislatur-Periode, I. Session 1878. 1. Band, Berlin 1878, S. VII–XXVII (Digitalisat)
- Stenographische Berichte über die Verhandlungen des Deutschen Reichstags. 4. Legislatur-Periode, II. Session 1879. 1. Band, Berlin 1879, S. IX–XXIX (Digitalisat)
- Stenographische Berichte über die Verhandlungen des Deutschen Reichstags. 4. Legislatur-Periode, III. Session 1880. 1. Band, Berlin 1880, S. XXIX–XLIX (Digitalisat)
- Stenographische Berichte über die Verhandlungen des Deutschen Reichstags. 4. Legislatur-Periode, IV. Session 1881. 1. Band, Berlin 1881, S. XXXIII–LIII (Digitalisat)
- Georg Hirth (Hrsg.): Deutscher Parlamentsalmanach 14. Ausgabe, November 1881. Leipzig 1881, daten.digitale-sammlungen.de
- Stenographische Berichte über die Verhandlungen des Deutschen Reichstags. 5. Legislatur-Periode, I. Session 1881. 1. Band. Berlin 1881, reichstagsprotokolle.de
- Wilhelm Heinz Schröder: Sozialdemokratische Reichstagsabgeordnete und Reichstagskandidaten 1898–1918. Biographisch-statistisches Handbuch. (= Handbücher zur Geschichte des Parliamentarismus und der politischen Parteien, Band 2). Droste, Düsseldorf 1986, ISBN 3-7700-5135-1
- Bernd Haunfelder: Reichstagsabgeordnete der Deutschen Zentrumspartei 1871–1933. Biographisches Handbuch und historische Photographien. (= Photodokumente zur Geschichte des Parliamentarismus und der politischen Parteien, Band 4). Droste, Düsseldorf 1999, ISBN 3-7700-5223-4
- Bernd Haunfelder: Die liberalen Abgeordneten des deutschen Reichstags 1871–1918. Ein biographisches Handbuch. Aschendorff, Münster 2004, ISBN 3-402-06614-9
- Bernd Haunfelder: Die konservativen Abgeordneten des deutschen Reichstags von 1871 bis 1918. Ein biographisches Handbuch. Aschendorff, Münster 2009, ISBN 978-3-402-12829-9
