= Gresswiller =

Gresswiller Grasswiller
- Commune
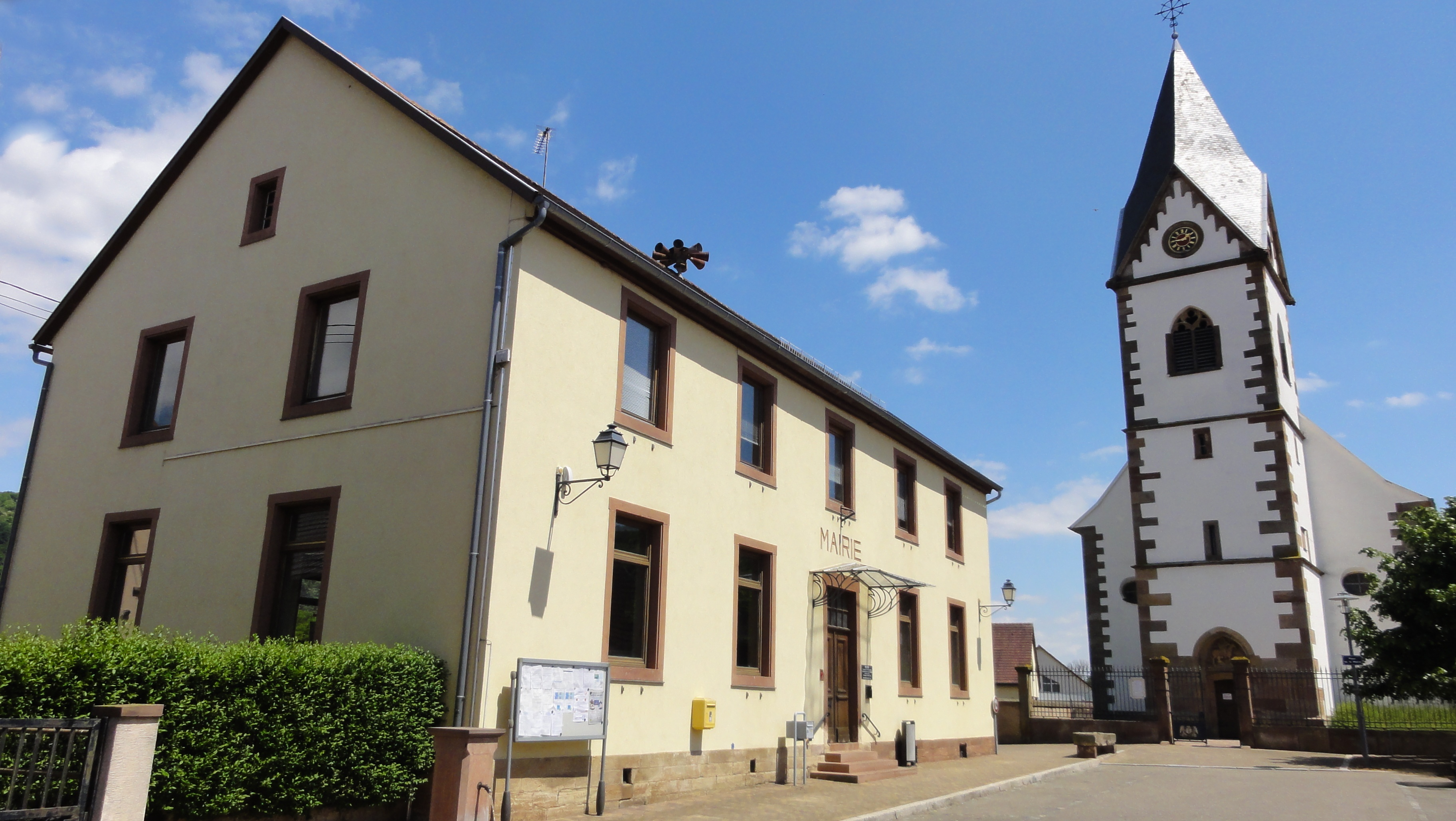
- The town hall in Gresswiller

- Coat of arms
- Location of Gresswiller
- Location within France Location within Grand Est
- Coordinates: 48°32′09″N 7°25′53″E
- Country: France
- Region: Grand Est
- Department: Bas-Rhin
- Arrondissement: Molsheim
- Canton: Mutzig

Government
  - Mayor (2020–2026): Pierre Thielen
- Area^{1}: 9.27 km^{2} (3.58 sq mi)
- Highest elevation: 322 m (1,056 ft)
- Lowest elevation: 192 m (630 ft)
- Population (2023): 1,695
  - Density: 183/km^{2} (474/sq mi)
- Time zone: UTC+01:00 (CET)
  - Summer (DST): UTC+02:00 (CEST)
- INSEE/Postal code: 67168 /67190
- ^{1} French Land Register data, which excludes lakes, ponds, glaciers > 1 km^{2} (0.386 sq mi or 247 acres) and river estuaries.

Gresswiller (French pronunciation: [gʁɛsvilɛʁ]; German: Greßweiler or Gressweiler) is a commune in the Bas-Rhin department in Grand Est in northeastern France.

== Geography ==
=== Adjacent communes ===
Mollkirch, Rosenwiller, Dinsheim-sur-Bruche, Heiligenberg, and Mutzig.

== Notable people ==
Auguste Dubois, painter and engraver (1892–1973) was born at Gresswiller. Between 1920 and 1922 he worked closely with Ettore Bugatti whose automobile factory was located at nearby Molsheim.

== Landmarks ==
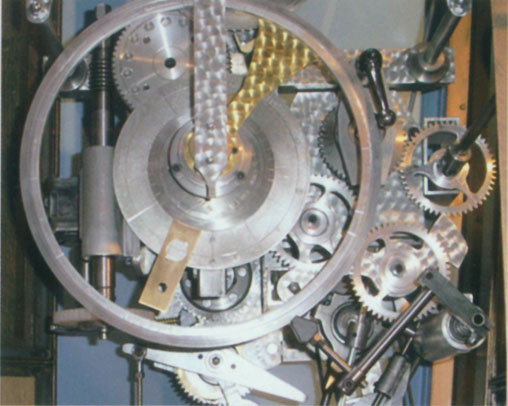
Mechanism for the Gresswiller planetarium

Unusually, Gresswiller has its own orrery.

== See also ==
- Communes of the Bas-Rhin department
