= Saulxures =

Saulxures may refer to the following communes in France:

- Saulxures, Bas-Rhin, in the Bas-Rhin department
- Saulxures, Haute-Marne, in the Haute-Marne department
- Saulxures-lès-Bulgnéville, in the Vosges department
- Saulxures-lès-Nancy, in the Meurthe-et-Moselle department
- Saulxures-lès-Vannes, in the Meurthe-et-Moselle department
- Saulxures-sur-Moselotte, in the Vosges department
