= Oberelsaß =

Historical region of eastern France in German empire

Coordinates: 47°54′N 7°15′E

District of Upper Alsace Bezirk Oberelsaß (in German)
- District of Alsace–Lorraine
- 1871–1918
- Flag Coat of arms

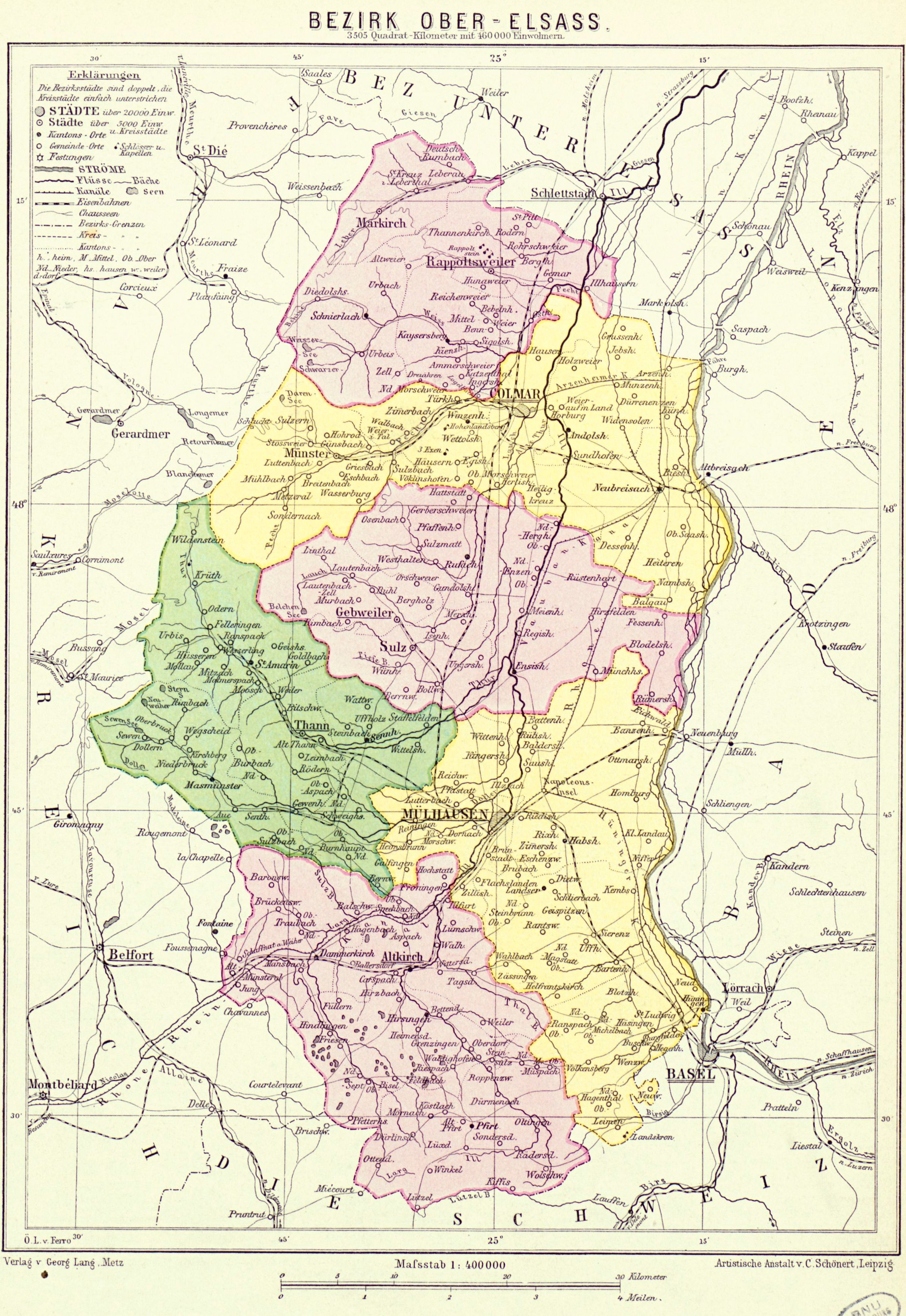
- Upper Alsace district with its subdistricts in different colours (1890)
- Capital: Kolmar
- Area
  - 1885: 3.508 km^{2} (1.354 sq mi)
  - 1910: 3.508 km^{2} (1.354 sq mi)
- Population
  - 1885: 462.549
  - 1910: 517.865
- History
  - Franco-Prussian War: 1870–1871
  - Established: 1871
  - Disestablished: 1918
- Political subdivisions: 6 rural districts
Preceded by	Succeeded by
Haut-Rhin	Haut-Rhin
- Today part of: France

Upper Alsace (German: Oberelsaß, French: Haute-Alsace) was the southern part of the historical region Alsace. From 1871 to 1918, Bezirk Oberelsaß was a district (Bezirk) in the southern part of the province of Alsace–Lorraine in the German Empire. The district was formed on 30 December 1871 from the former French département of Haut-Rhin, to which it corresponds exactly. Its capital was Colmar. It was divided into the districts (Kreise) of:

- Altkirch within the Sundgau
- Colmar
- Gebweiler (Guebwiller)
- Mülhausen (Mulhouse)
- Rappoltsweiler (Ribeauvillé)
- Thann

The flag of Oberelsaß is a yellow bar on a red field decorated on each side with three crowns. The combination of this flag with that of Unterelsaß forms the flag of modern Alsace.
