= Still, Bas-Rhin =

Still
- Commune
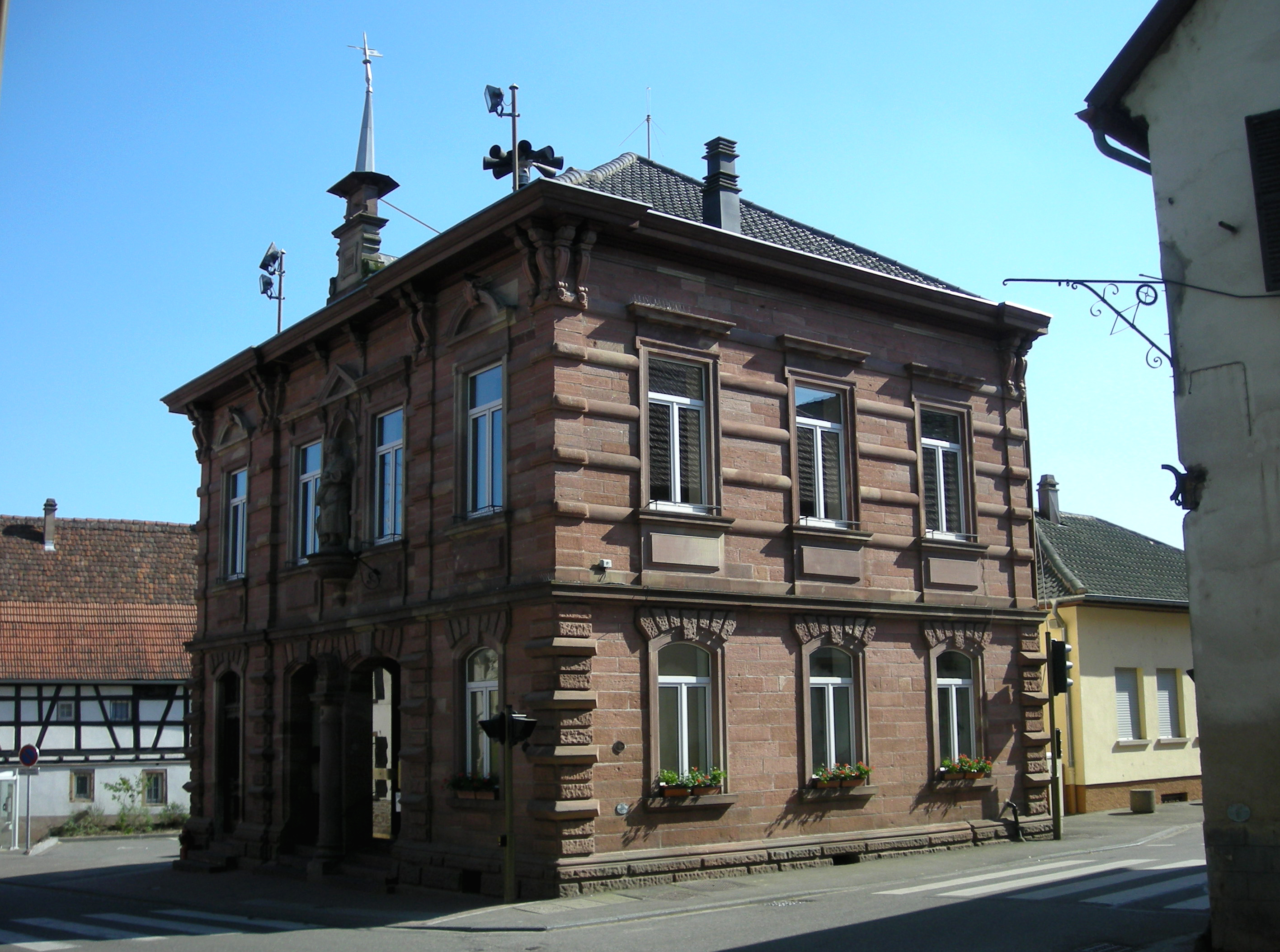
- The town hall in Still

- Coat of arms
- Location of Still
- Location within France Location within Grand Est
- Coordinates: 48°33′04″N 7°24′15″E
- Country: France
- Region: Grand Est
- Department: Bas-Rhin
- Arrondissement: Molsheim
- Canton: Mutzig

Government
  - Mayor (2020–2026): Alexandre Gonçalves
- Area^{1}: 23.2 km^{2} (9.0 sq mi)
- Highest elevation: 741 m (2,431 ft)
- Lowest elevation: 204 m (669 ft)
- Population (2023): 1,793
  - Density: 77.3/km^{2} (200/sq mi)
- Time zone: UTC+01:00 (CET)
  - Summer (DST): UTC+02:00 (CEST)
- INSEE/Postal code: 67480 /67190
- ^{1} French Land Register data, which excludes lakes, ponds, glaciers > 1 km^{2} (0.386 sq mi or 247 acres) and river estuaries.

Still is a commune in the Bas-Rhin department in Grand Est in north-eastern France.

== See also ==
- Communes of the Bas-Rhin department
