= Barembach =

- Commune
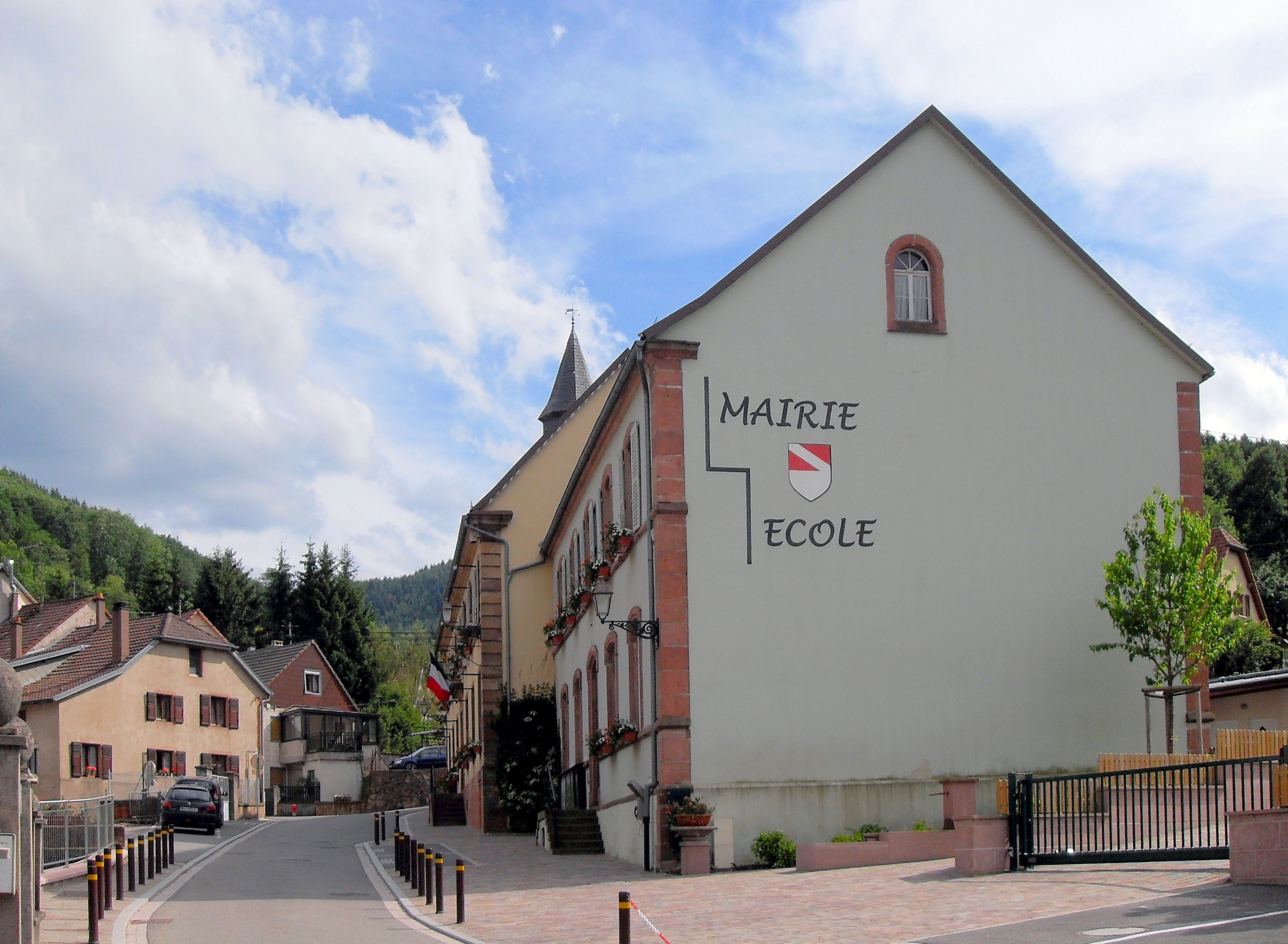
- The Town Hall / School

- Coat of arms
- Location of Barembach
- Location within France Location within Grand Est
- Coordinates: 48°28′37″N 7°13′51″E
- Country: France
- Region: Grand Est
- Department: Bas-Rhin
- Arrondissement: Molsheim
- Canton: Mutzig

Government
  - Mayor (2020–2026): André Meyer
- Area^{1}: 9.92 km^{2} (3.83 sq mi)
- Highest elevation: 910 m (2,990 ft)
- Lowest elevation: 289 m (948 ft)
- Population (2023): 810
  - Density: 82/km^{2} (210/sq mi)
- Time zone: UTC+01:00 (CET)
  - Summer (DST): UTC+02:00 (CEST)
- INSEE/Postal code: 67020 /67130
- ^{1} French Land Register data, which excludes lakes, ponds, glaciers > 1 km^{2} (0.386 sq mi or 247 acres) and river estuaries.

Barembach is a commune in the Bas-Rhin department in the Grand Est region of north-eastern France.

== Geography ==
Barembach is located in a valley perpendicular to the Bruche valley some 25 km west by south-west of Illkirch and 30 km north-west of Sélestat at 350 metres above sea level. The Barembach Forest covers most of the commune with several summits including Pépinière (666 metres), Barraque des Bœufs (781 metres), Ordon Saxe (690 metres), and Haut de la Brûlée (715 metres). Access to the commune is by the D204 road from Grendelbruch in the north-east which passes through the north-eastern corner of the commune and continues to Schirmeck. Access to the village is by the D193 which branches off the D204 in the commune. The D1420 from Muhlbach-sur-Bruche in the north-east passes along the northern border as it goes south-west to Fouday.

The Barembach river rises in the south-east of the commune and flows north-west to join the Bruche just north-west of the commune. The Bornichon river rises in the south of the commune and flows north to join the Barembach at the village.

== History ==
Barembach is the municipality of the Bruche Valley with the earliest recorded mention, dating back to 974 AD, when a document stated that the two churches of Barembach and Grendelbruch were to be annexed by the Abbey of Altorf. The abbey’s territory included the right bank of the Bruche from the confluence with the Rothaine.

Barembach was completely destroyed in 1875 by a violent fire. After the reconstruction of the village almost immediately after the disaster, the economy first restarted with livestock and forestry. There were also mills and sawmills producing galoshes which later changed to weaving. An enterprise was set up by Camille Glaszmann which specialised in Theatrical property. The company was sold in 1964 and continued by Mecatherm who extended the buildings. Shortly before Liberation the village was the headquarters of Marshal Jean de Lattre de Tassigny and served as a springboard to free the region. Barembach previously included part of the commune of Rothau on the north shore of the Rothaine.

Barembach appears as Barenbach on the 1750 Cassini Map and the same on the 1790 version.

The name Barembach originated from the German Bach meaning "stream" and Bär meaning "bear".

=== Heraldry ===
Arms of Barembach	Blazon: Party per fess, at 1 Gules, a bend Argent; at 2 Argent.

== Administration ==
List of Successive Mayors

From	To	Name
1977	1989	Lucien Zimmermann
2001	2020	Gérard Douvier
2020	2026	André Meyer
2026	2032	Bernard Juillot

== Demography ==
The inhabitants of the commune are known as Barembachois or Barembachoises in French.

Historical population

Year	Pop.	±% p.a.
1793	532	—
1800	571	+1.02%
1806	768	+5.06%
1821	744	−0.21%
1831	945	+2.42%
1836	1,011	+1.36%
1841	1,040	+0.57%
1846	1,030	−0.19%
1851	1,086	+1.06%
1856	1,029	−1.07%
1861	1,070	+0.78%
1866	1,035	−0.66%
1871	944	−1.82%
1875	832	−3.11%
1880	765	−1.67%
1885	751	−0.37%
1890	738	−0.35%
1895	751	+0.35%
1900	829	+2.00%

Year	Pop.	±% p.a.
1905	899	+1.63%
1910	862	−0.84%
1921	756	−1.19%
1926	775	+0.50%
1931	788	+0.33%
1936	812	+0.60%
1946	794	−0.22%
1954	853	+0.90%
1962	846	−0.10%
1968	842	−0.08%
1975	852	+0.17%
1982	849	−0.05%
1990	872	+0.33%
1999	873	+0.01%
2007	894	+0.30%
2012	873	−0.47%
2017	874	+0.02%
2023	810	−1.26%

Source: EHESS and INSEE

== Culture and heritage ==
=== Civil heritage ===
The commune has many buildings and sites that are registered as historical monuments:

- Houses and Farmhouses (19th century)
- The War Memorial at Route du Maréchal-De-Lattre-de-Tassigny (20th century)
- A School at 14 Rue Principale (20th century)
- The Town Hall / School at 15 Rue Principale (20th century) The Town Hall / School contains several items that are registered as historical objects:
  - A Heating Stove (19th century)
  - A Monumental Cross: Christ on the Cross and the Virgin and child (Modern)

=== Religious heritage ===
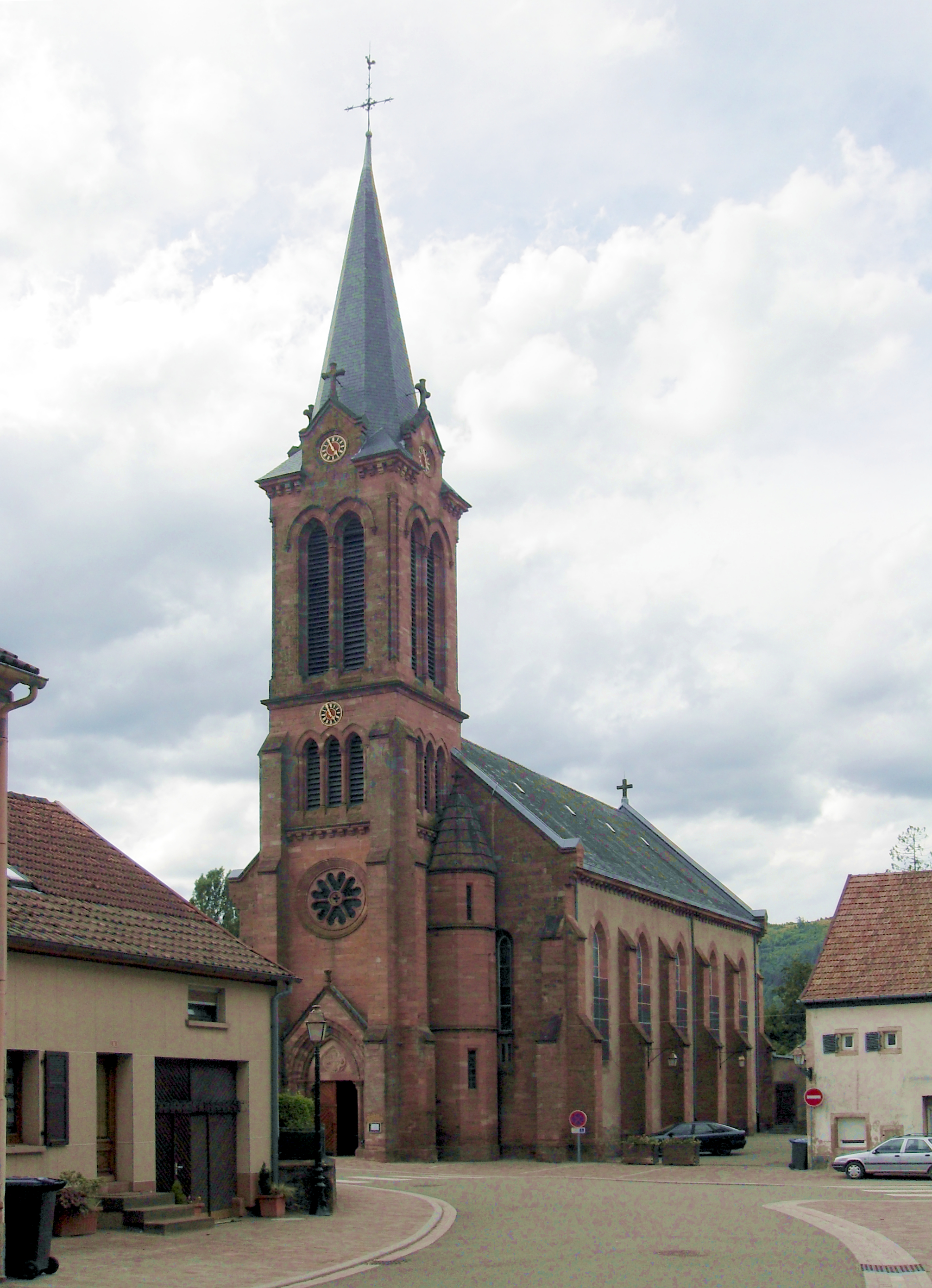
The Church of Saint-Georges

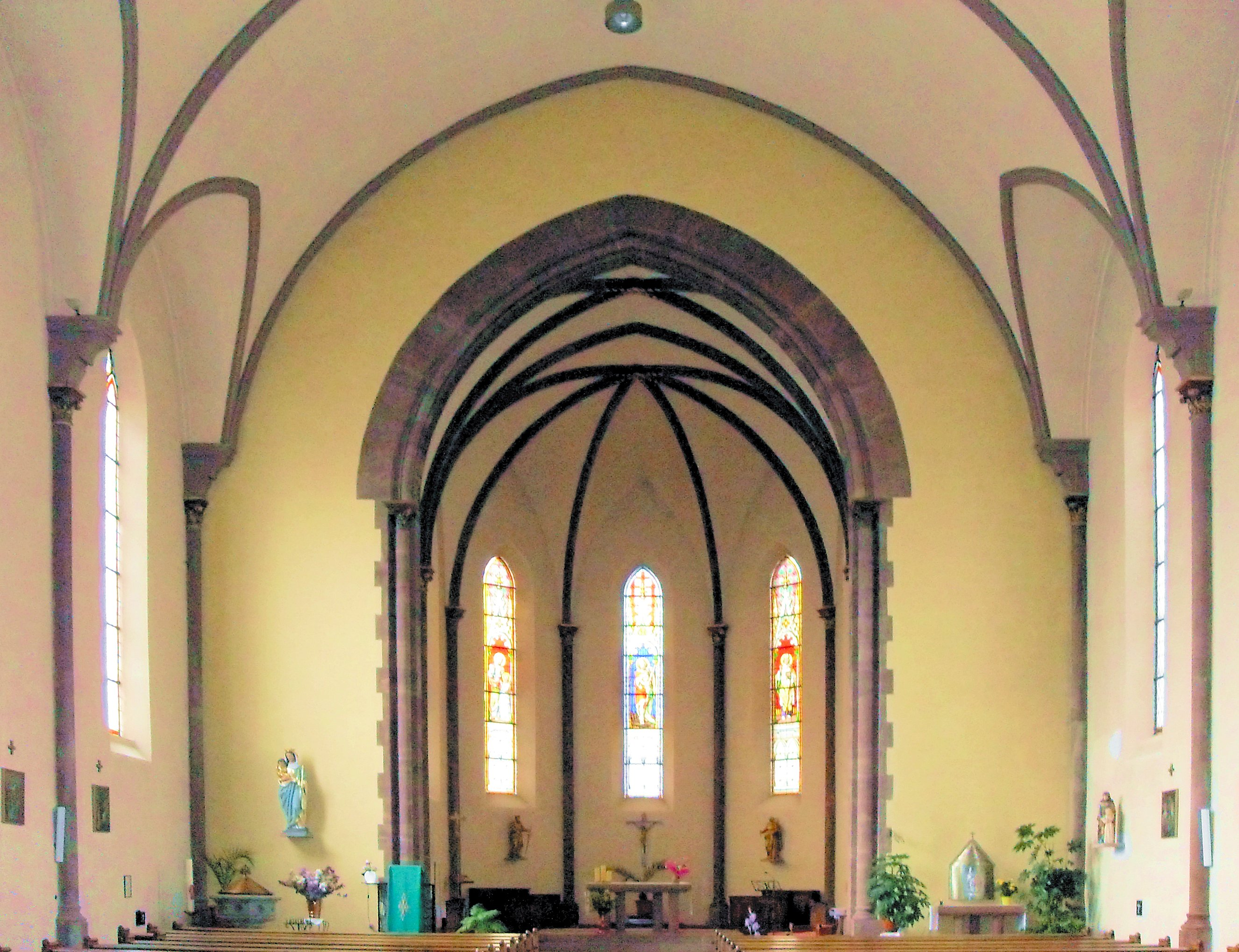
The Church Interior

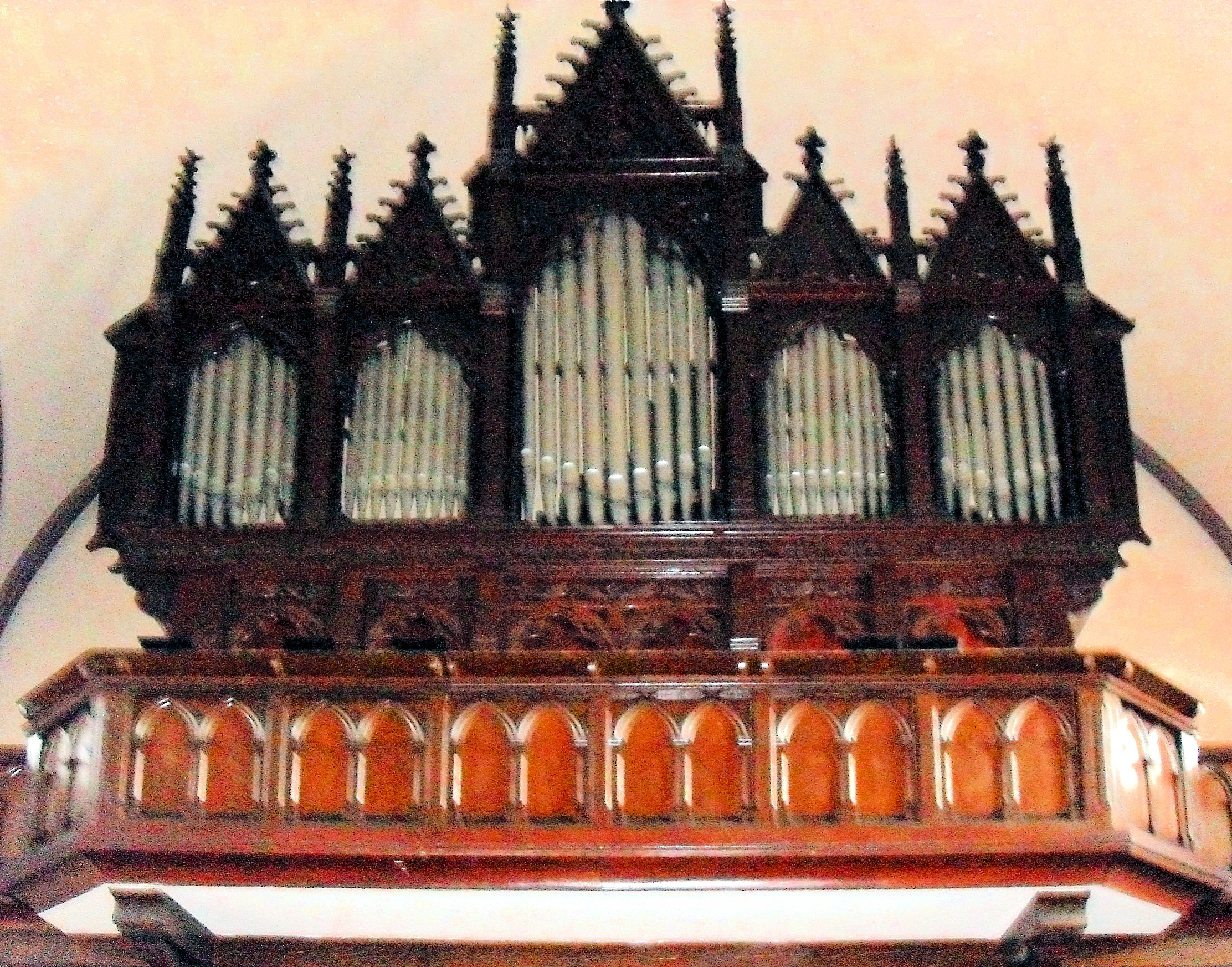
The Church Organ

The commune has several religious buildings and sites that are registered as historical monuments:

- The Barembach Cemetery on the D204 (19th century) The Cemetery contains several items that are registered as historical objects:
  - A Cemetery Cross (1761)
  - Funeral Monuments (18th century)
- The Schirmeck Cemetery at Rue du Douar (19th century) The Cemetery contains many items that are registered as historical objects:
  - Funeral Monuments (19th century)
  - Funeral Crosses (19th century)
  - A Monumental Cross (No. 1) (1849)
  - A Monumental Cross: Christ on the Cross (No. 2) (18th century)
  - A Cemetery Cross: Christ on the Cross (1811)
- The Chartier Family Funeral Chapel on the D204 (20th century)
- The Vogt Family Funeral Chapel at Rue du Douar (20th century)
- The Church of Saint-Georges at Place de l'Église (1877) The Church contains several items that are registered as historical objects:
  - A Chalice with Paten (19th century)
  - A Monstrance (19th century)
  - The Furniture in the Church
  - The Church Organ (1886)
- A Presbytery at 16 Rue du Presbytère (19th century)
- 3 Wayside Crosses are registered as historical objects.

== Notable people linked to the commune ==
- Marshal Jean de Lattre de Tassigny had his headquarters in the village. The street from the cemetery to the church bears his name. There is a monument to him on this street near the church.

== See also ==
- Communes of the Bas-Rhin department

== Bibliography ==
- "Barembach", in The Upper Valley of the Bruche, Alsace Heritage, General Inventory of Monuments and artistic riches of France, Éditions Lieux Dits, Lyon, 2005, p. 38-39, ISBN 978-2-914528-13-9 (in French)
