= Triembach-au-Val =

- Commune
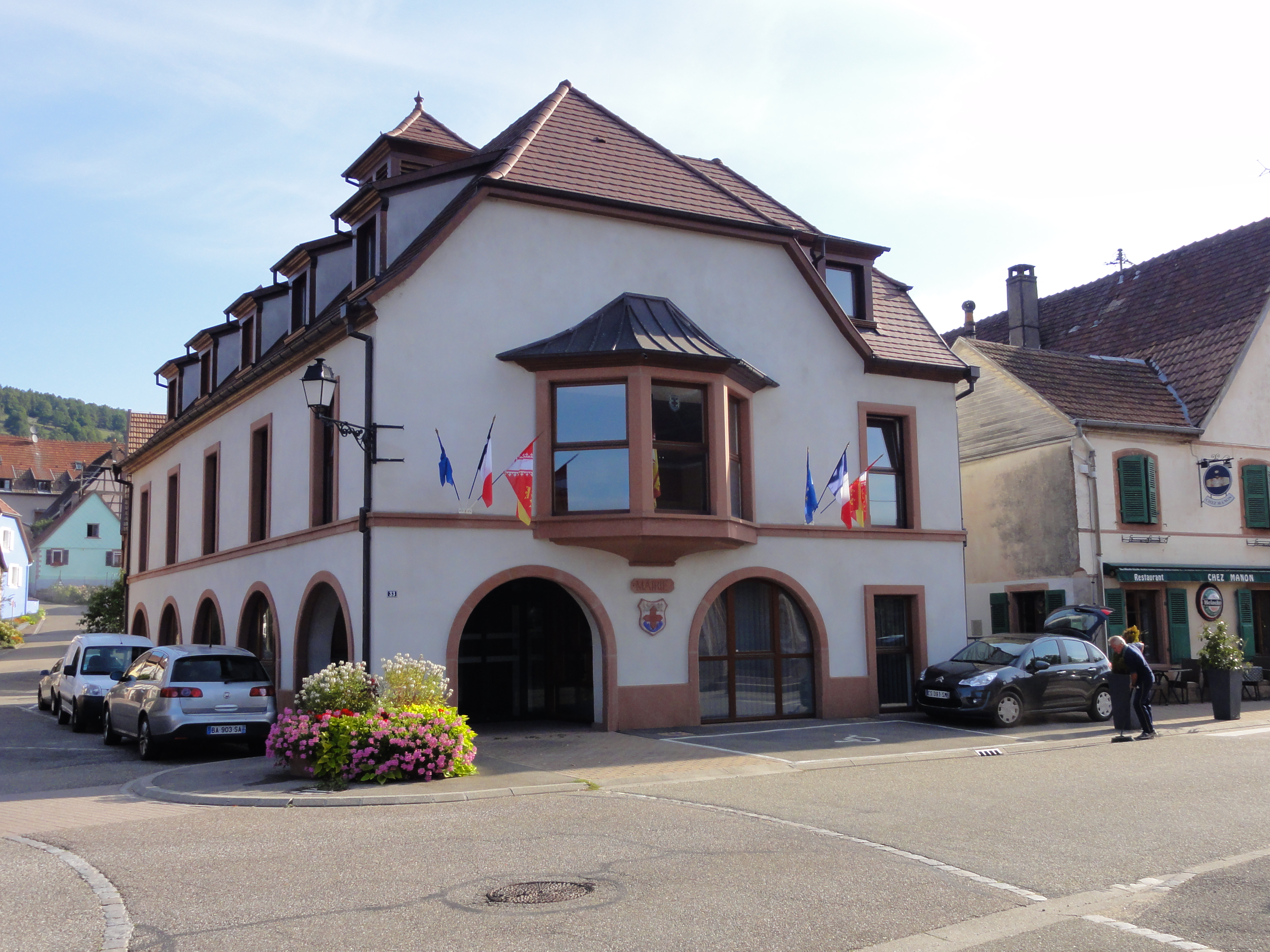
- The town hall in Triembach-au-Val

- Coat of arms
- Location of Triembach-au-Val
- Location within France Location within Grand Est
- Coordinates: 48°20′18″N 7°19′33″E
- Country: France
- Region: Grand Est
- Department: Bas-Rhin
- Arrondissement: Sélestat-Erstein
- Canton: Mutzig

Government
  - Mayor (2020–2026): Gérard Debauchez
- Area^{1}: 2.74 km^{2} (1.06 sq mi)
- Highest elevation: 540 m (1,770 ft)
- Lowest elevation: 246 m (807 ft)
- Population (2023): 421
  - Density: 154/km^{2} (398/sq mi)
- Time zone: UTC+01:00 (CET)
  - Summer (DST): UTC+02:00 (CEST)
- INSEE/Postal code: 67493 /67220
- ^{1} French Land Register data, which excludes lakes, ponds, glaciers > 1 km^{2} (0.386 sq mi or 247 acres) and river estuaries.

Triembach-au-Val (German: Triembach) is a commune in the Bas-Rhin department in Alsace in north-eastern France.

== See also ==
- Communes of the Bas-Rhin department
