= Heiligenberg, Bas-Rhin =

Heiligenberg Hellebari
- Commune
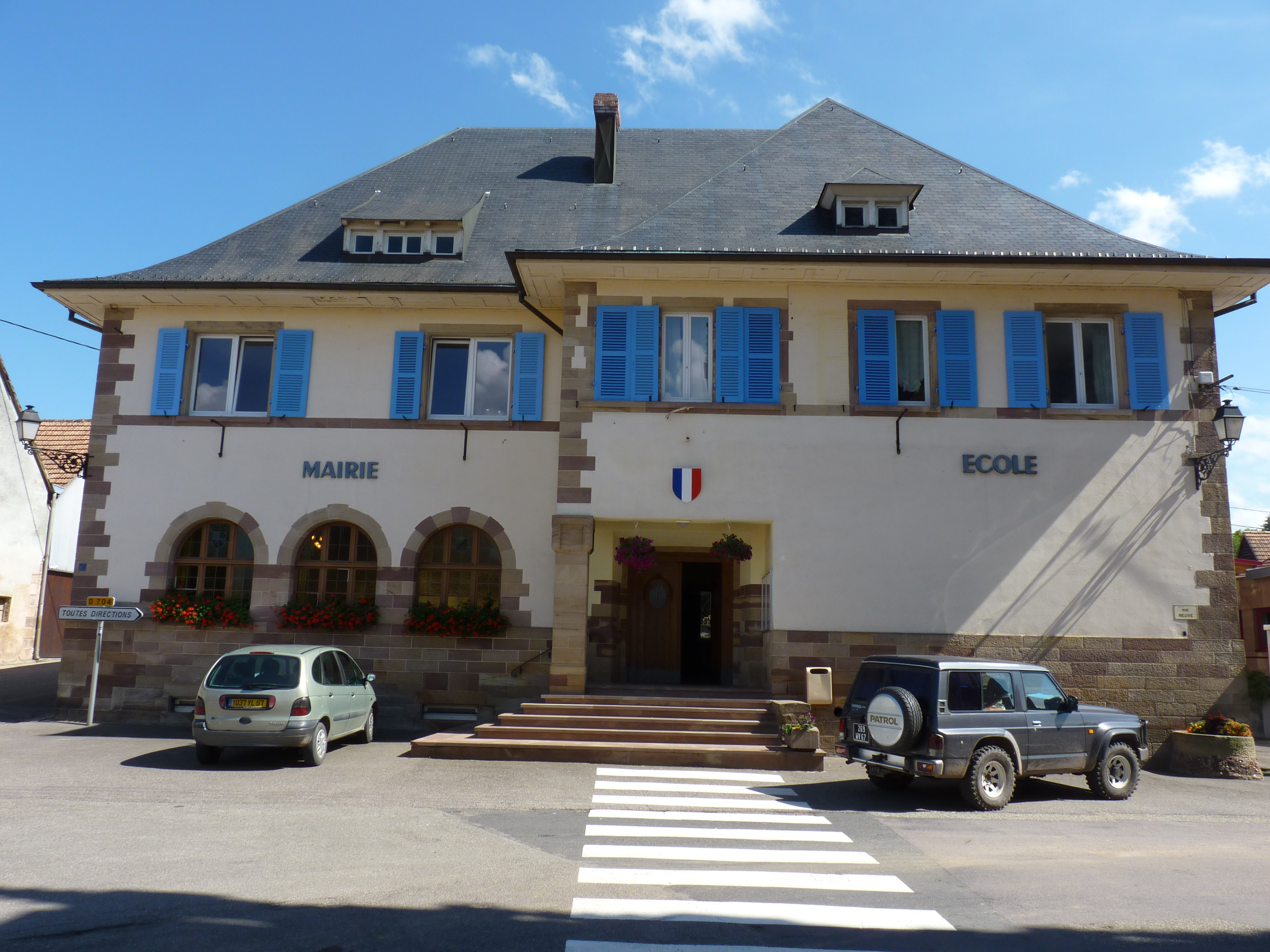
- The town hall in Heiligenberg

- Coat of arms
- Location of Heiligenberg
- Location within France Location within Grand Est
- Coordinates: 48°32′20″N 7°23′26″E
- Country: France
- Region: Grand Est
- Department: Bas-Rhin
- Arrondissement: Molsheim
- Canton: Mutzig

Government
  - Mayor (2020–2026): Guy Ernst
- Area^{1}: 5.47 km^{2} (2.11 sq mi)
- Highest elevation: 407 m (1,335 ft)
- Lowest elevation: 204 m (669 ft)
- Population (2023): 687
  - Density: 126/km^{2} (325/sq mi)
- Time zone: UTC+01:00 (CET)
  - Summer (DST): UTC+02:00 (CEST)
- INSEE/Postal code: 67188 /67190
- ^{1} French Land Register data, which excludes lakes, ponds, glaciers > 1 km^{2} (0.386 sq mi or 247 acres) and river estuaries.

Heiligenberg (French pronunciation: [ailigənbɛʁɡ]) is a commune in the Bas-Rhin department in Grand Est in north-eastern France. Its name means mountain of the saints in German.

== Geography ==
The village is positioned approximately ten kilometres (six miles) to the west of Molsheim, on high ground overlooking the Bruche valley. To the west is the great domainal forest of Haslach.

Unusually in Alsace, this is one village not traversed by a numbered departmental road: it does, however, overlook the former Route Nationale N420 in the valley below, a long distance road rendered less important in recent years by the development of the autoroute network: in 2006 this stretch of road was formally downgraded to become the Route Departmentale RD 420.

== History ==
The villagers rescued the mail and the crew of a Montgolfier balloon after it escaped the Siege of Paris on 25 October 1870. The balloon's anchor has been kept.

== See also ==
- Communes of the Bas-Rhin department
