= Urbeis =

- Commune
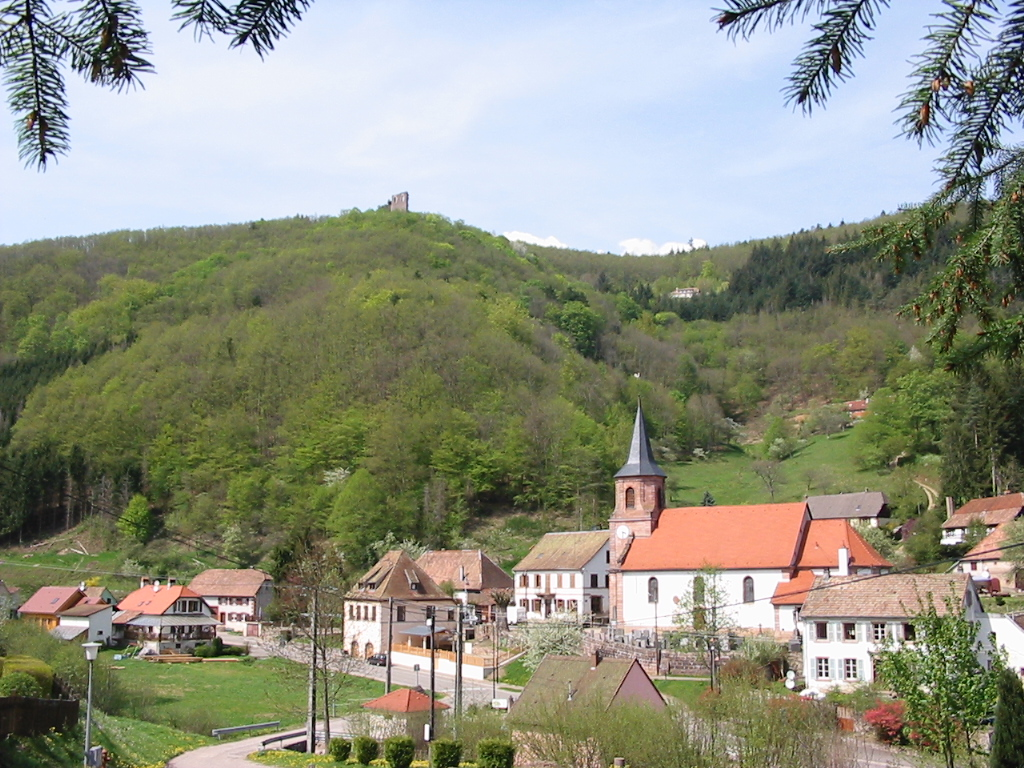
- A general view of Urbeis

- Coat of arms
- Location of Urbeis
- Location within France Location within Grand Est
- Coordinates: 48°19′35″N 7°13′28″E
- Country: France
- Region: Grand Est
- Department: Bas-Rhin
- Arrondissement: Sélestat-Erstein
- Canton: Mutzig

Government
  - Mayor (2020–2026): Abel Mangeolle
- Area^{1}: 11.6 km^{2} (4.5 sq mi)
- Highest elevation: 962 m (3,156 ft)
- Lowest elevation: 324 m (1,063 ft)
- Population (2023): 309
  - Density: 26.6/km^{2} (69.0/sq mi)
- Time zone: UTC+01:00 (CET)
  - Summer (DST): UTC+02:00 (CEST)
- INSEE/Postal code: 67499 /67220
- ^{1} French Land Register data, which excludes lakes, ponds, glaciers > 1 km^{2} (0.386 sq mi or 247 acres) and river estuaries.

Urbeis is a commune in the Bas-Rhin department in Alsace in north-eastern France. It used to be an important business centre of silver mines.

== See also ==
- Communes of the Bas-Rhin department
