= Canton of Mutzig =

Coordinates: 48.54°N 7.45°E

- Canton
- Situation of the canton of Mutzig in the department of Bas-Rhin
- Country: France
- Region: Grand Est
- Department: Bas-Rhin
- No. of communes: {{{nbcomm}}}
- Population (2023): 46,236
- INSEE code: 6711

The canton of Mutzig is an administrative division of the Bas-Rhin department, northeastern France. It was created at the French canton reorganisation which came into effect in March 2015. Its seat is in Mutzig.

It consists of the following communes:

1. Albé
2. Barembach
3. Bassemberg
4. Bellefosse
5. Belmont
6. Blancherupt
7. Bourg-Bruche
8. Breitenau
9. Breitenbach
10. La Broque
11. Colroy-la-Roche
12. Dieffenbach-au-Val
13. Dinsheim-sur-Bruche
14. Fouchy
15. Fouday
16. Grandfontaine
17. Gresswiller
18. Heiligenberg
19. Lalaye
20. Lutzelhouse
21. Maisonsgoutte
22. Muhlbach-sur-Bruche
23. Mutzig
24. Natzwiller
25. Neubois
26. Neuve-Église
27. Neuviller-la-Roche
28. Niederhaslach
29. Oberhaslach
30. Plaine
31. Ranrupt
32. Rothau
33. Russ
34. Saales
35. Saint-Blaise-la-Roche
36. Saint-Martin
37. Saint-Maurice
38. Saint-Pierre-Bois
39. Saulxures
40. Schirmeck
41. Solbach
42. Steige
43. Still
44. Thanvillé
45. Triembach-au-Val
46. Urbeis
47. Urmatt
48. Villé
49. Waldersbach
50. Wildersbach
51. Wisches
