= Breitenau, Bas-Rhin =

Breitenau Braitnöi
- Commune
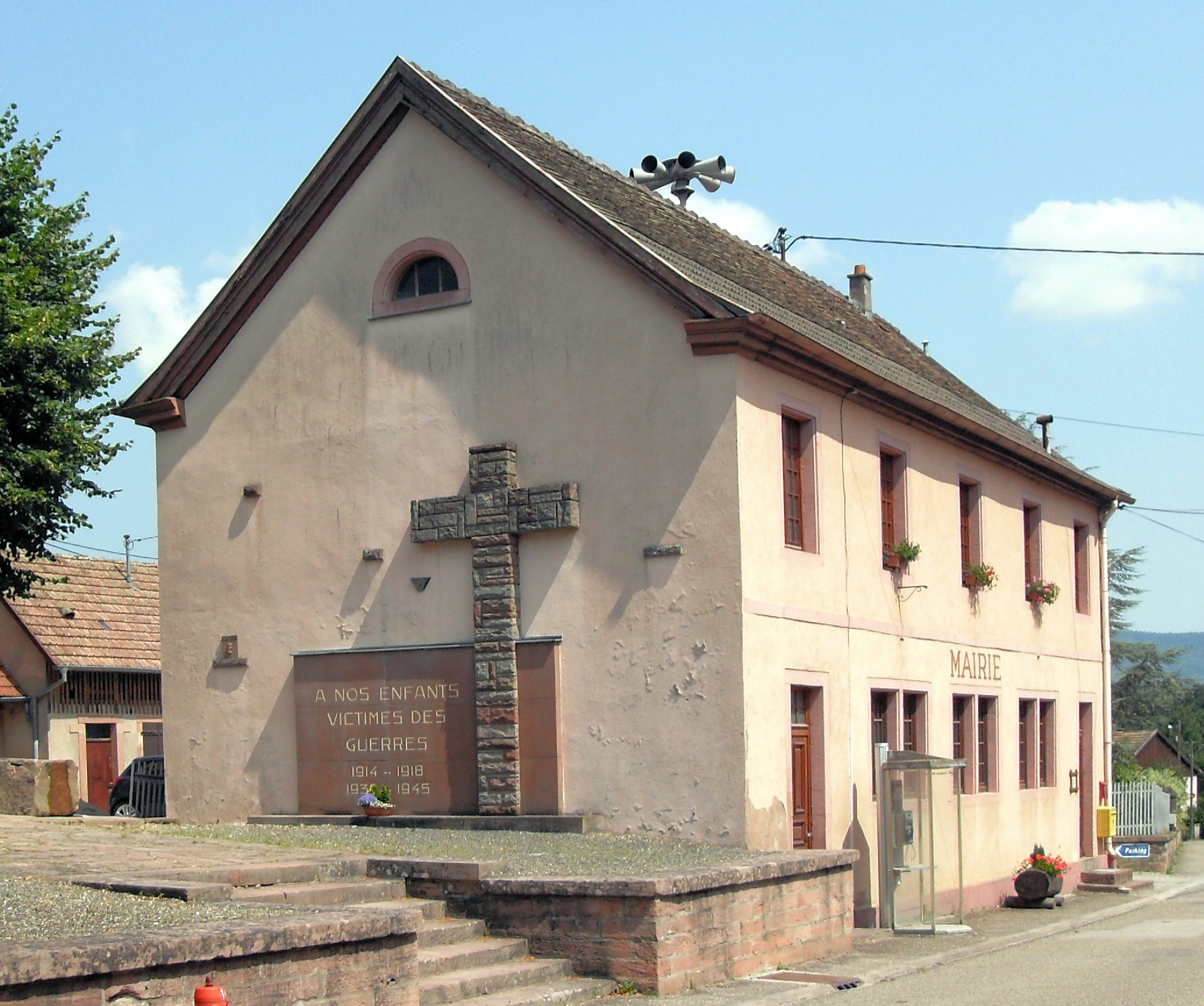
- The town hall in Breitenau

- Coat of arms
- Location of Breitenau
- Location within France Location within Grand Est
- Coordinates: 48°19′39″N 7°17′34″E
- Country: France
- Region: Grand Est
- Department: Bas-Rhin
- Arrondissement: Sélestat-Erstein
- Canton: Mutzig

Government
  - Mayor (2020–2026): Serge Janus
- Area^{1}: 4.29 km^{2} (1.66 sq mi)
- Highest elevation: 700 m (2,300 ft)
- Lowest elevation: 290 m (950 ft)
- Population (2023): 341
  - Density: 79.5/km^{2} (206/sq mi)
- Time zone: UTC+01:00 (CET)
  - Summer (DST): UTC+02:00 (CEST)
- INSEE/Postal code: 67062 /67220
- ^{1} French Land Register data, which excludes lakes, ponds, glaciers > 1 km^{2} (0.386 sq mi or 247 acres) and river estuaries.

Breitenau is a commune in the Bas-Rhin department in Alsace in north-eastern France.

== See also ==
- Communes of the Bas-Rhin department
