= Lutzelhouse =

- Commune
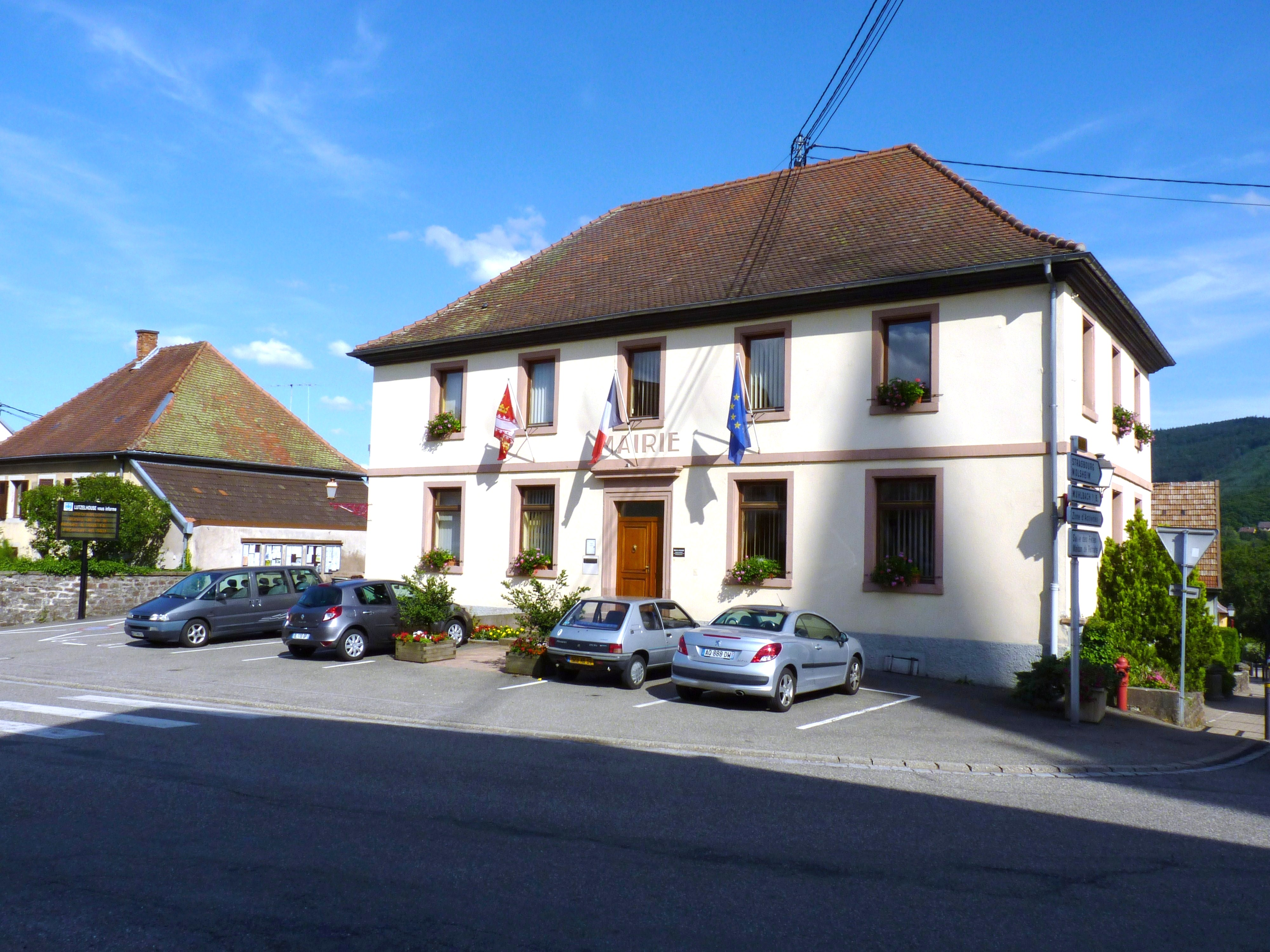
- The town hall in Lutzelhouse

- Coat of arms
- Location of Lutzelhouse
- Location within France Location within Grand Est
- Coordinates: 48°31′15″N 7°17′21″E
- Country: France
- Region: Grand Est
- Department: Bas-Rhin
- Arrondissement: Molsheim
- Canton: Mutzig

Government
  - Mayor (2020–2026): Jean-Louis Batt
- Area^{1}: 28.58 km^{2} (11.03 sq mi)
- Highest elevation: 1,003 m (3,291 ft)
- Lowest elevation: 244 m (801 ft)
- Population (2023): 1,959
  - Density: 68.54/km^{2} (177.5/sq mi)
- Time zone: UTC+01:00 (CET)
  - Summer (DST): UTC+02:00 (CEST)
- INSEE/Postal code: 67276 /67130
- ^{1} French Land Register data, which excludes lakes, ponds, glaciers > 1 km^{2} (0.386 sq mi or 247 acres) and river estuaries.

Lutzelhouse (French pronunciation: [lytsəluz]; German: Lützelhausen) is a commune in the Bas-Rhin department in Grand Est in north-eastern France.

== See also ==
- Communes of the Bas-Rhin department
