= Dinsheim-sur-Bruche =

Dinsheim-sur-Bruche Dìnse
- Commune
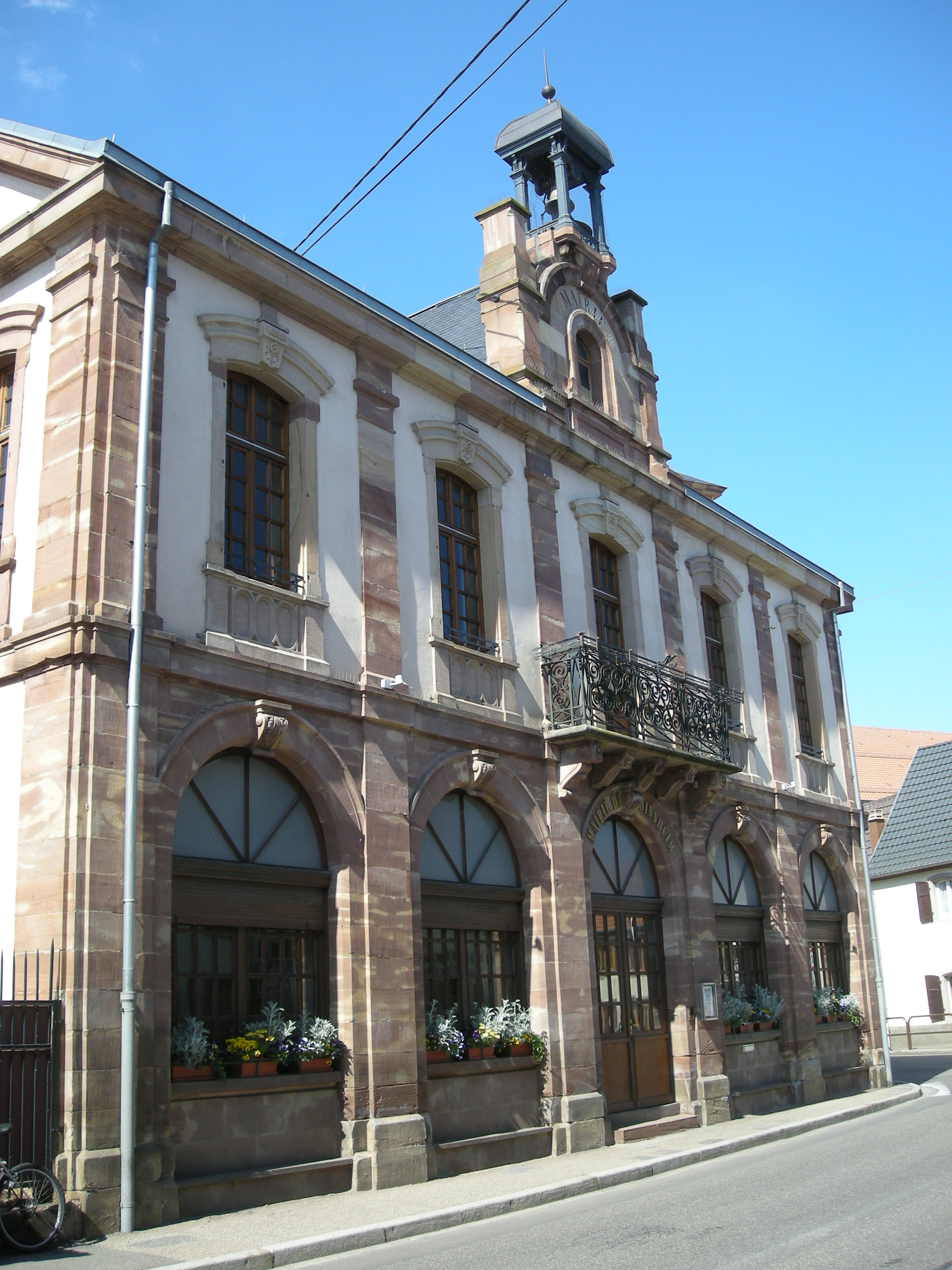
- The town hall in Dinsheim-sur-Bruche

- Coat of arms
- Location of Dinsheim-sur-Bruche
- Location within France Location within Grand Est
- Coordinates: 48°32′35″N 7°25′37″E
- Country: France
- Region: Grand Est
- Department: Bas-Rhin
- Arrondissement: Molsheim
- Canton: Mutzig

Government
  - Mayor (2020–2026): Marie-Reine Fischer
- Area^{1}: 4.98 km^{2} (1.92 sq mi)
- Highest elevation: 330 m (1,080 ft)
- Lowest elevation: 195 m (640 ft)
- Population (2023): 1,472
  - Density: 296/km^{2} (766/sq mi)
- Time zone: UTC+01:00 (CET)
  - Summer (DST): UTC+02:00 (CEST)
- INSEE/Postal code: 67098 /67190
- ^{1} French Land Register data, which excludes lakes, ponds, glaciers > 1 km^{2} (0.386 sq mi or 247 acres) and river estuaries.

Dinsheim-sur-Bruche (French pronunciation: [dinsaim syʁ bʁyʃ], literally Dinsheim on Bruche; German: Dinsheim, before 2003: Dinsheim) is a commune in the Bas-Rhin department in Grand Est in north-eastern France.

== See also ==
- Communes of the Bas-Rhin department
