= Maisonsgoutte =

Maisonsgoutte Maisegott
- Commune
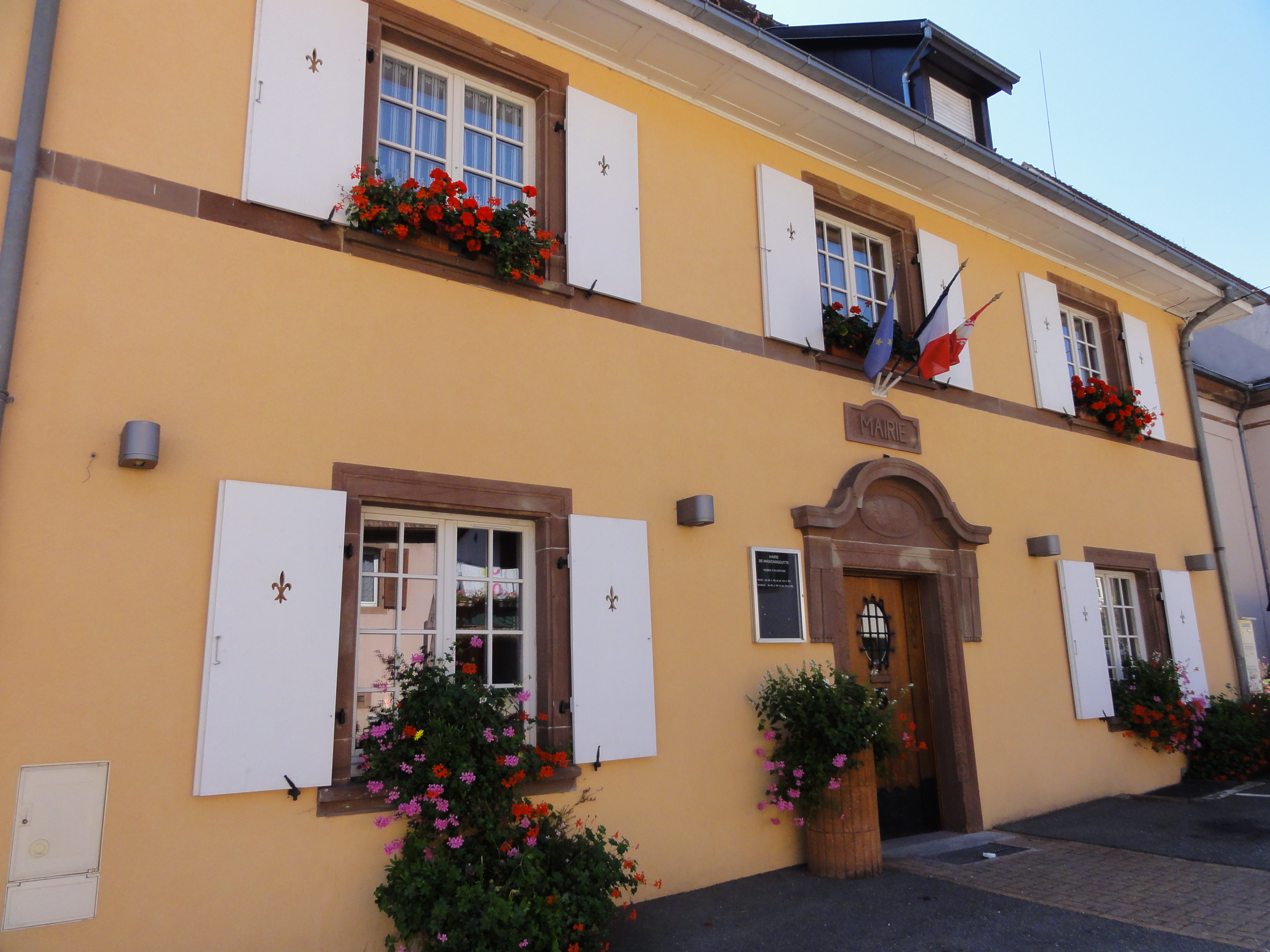
- The town hall in Maisonsgoutte

- Coat of arms
- Location of Maisonsgoutte
- Location within France Location within Grand Est
- Coordinates: 48°21′15″N 7°15′51″E
- Country: France
- Region: Grand Est
- Department: Bas-Rhin
- Arrondissement: Sélestat-Erstein
- Canton: Mutzig
- Intercommunality: Vallée de Villé

Government
  - Mayor (2020–2026): Christian Haessler
- Area^{1}: 4.87 km^{2} (1.88 sq mi)
- Highest elevation: 820 m (2,690 ft)
- Lowest elevation: 285 m (935 ft)
- Population (2023): 790
  - Density: 160/km^{2} (420/sq mi)
- Time zone: UTC+01:00 (CET)
  - Summer (DST): UTC+02:00 (CEST)
- INSEE/Postal code: 67280 /67220
- ^{1} French Land Register data, which excludes lakes, ponds, glaciers > 1 km^{2} (0.386 sq mi or 247 acres) and river estuaries.

Maisonsgoutte (French pronunciation: [mɛzɔ̃ɡut]; German: Meisengut or Meisengott) is a commune in the Bas-Rhin department in Alsace in north-eastern France.

== See also ==
- Communes of the Bas-Rhin department
