= Muhlbach-sur-Bruche =

- Commune
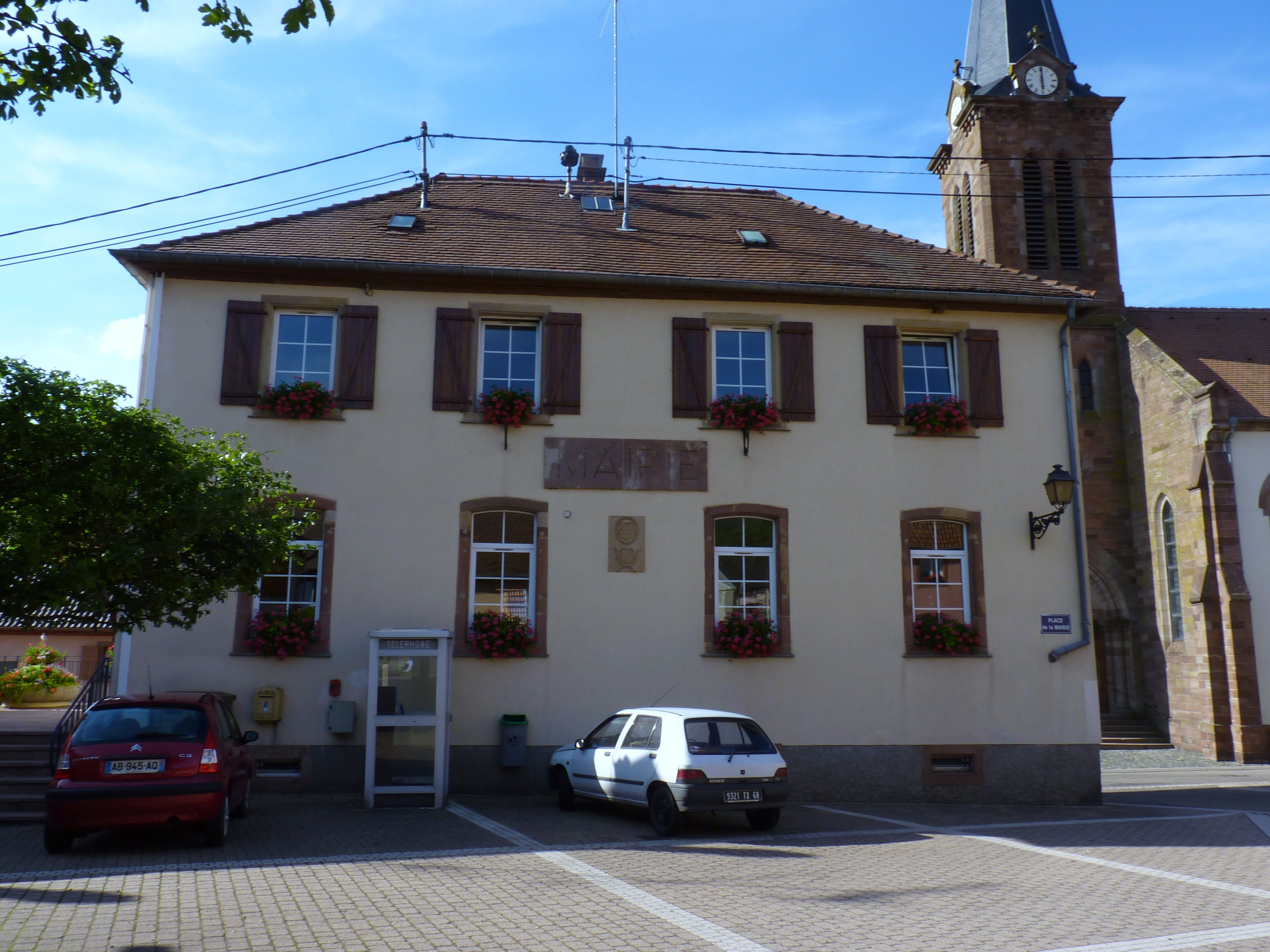
- Municipal building of Muhlbach-sur-Bruche

- Coat of arms
- Location of Muhlbach-sur-Bruche
- Location within France Location within Grand Est
- Coordinates: 48°31′01″N 7°17′55″E
- Country: France
- Region: Grand Est
- Department: Bas-Rhin
- Arrondissement: Molsheim
- Canton: Mutzig

Government
  - Mayor (2020–2026): Nicolas Bonel
- Area^{1}: 8.38 km^{2} (3.24 sq mi)
- Highest elevation: 620 m (2,030 ft)
- Lowest elevation: 228 m (748 ft)
- Population (2023): 683
  - Density: 81.5/km^{2} (211/sq mi)
- Time zone: UTC+01:00 (CET)
  - Summer (DST): UTC+02:00 (CEST)
- INSEE/Postal code: 67306 /67130
- ^{1} French Land Register data, which excludes lakes, ponds, glaciers > 1 km^{2} (0.386 sq mi or 247 acres) and river estuaries.

Muhlbach-sur-Bruche (German: Mühlbach an der Breusch) is a commune in the Bas-Rhin department in Grand Est in north-eastern France.

== See also ==
- Communes of the Bas-Rhin department
