= Dieffenbach-au-Val =

Dieffenbach-au-Val Diefebàch
- Commune
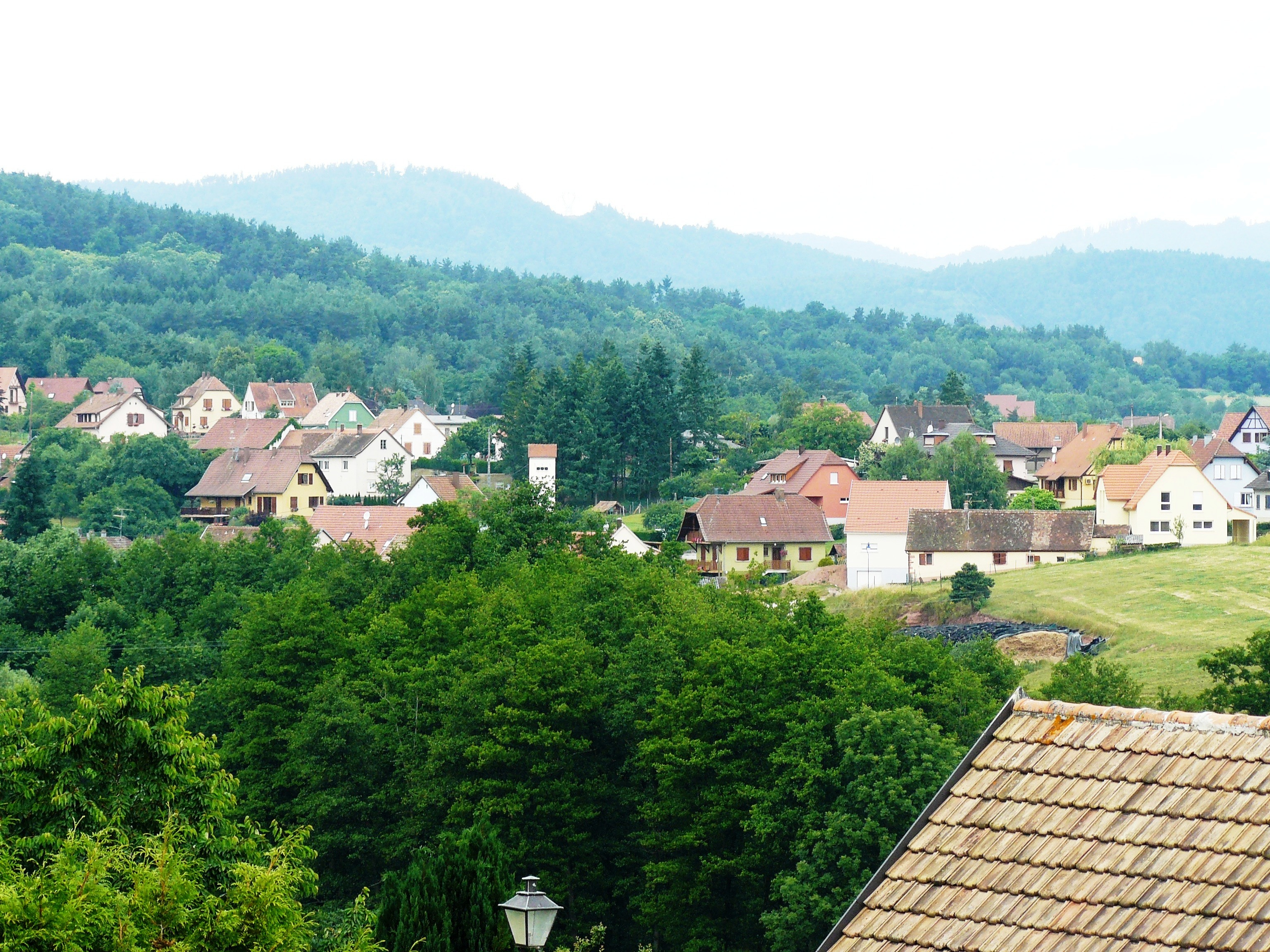
- A general view of Dieffenbach-au-Val

- Coat of arms
- Location of Dieffenbach-au-Val
- Location within France Location within Grand Est
- Coordinates: 48°18′54″N 7°19′38″E
- Country: France
- Region: Grand Est
- Department: Bas-Rhin
- Arrondissement: Sélestat-Erstein
- Canton: Mutzig
- Intercommunality: Vallée de Villé

Government
  - Mayor (2020–2026): Bernard Schmitt
- Area^{1}: 2.95 km^{2} (1.14 sq mi)
- Highest elevation: 560 m (1,840 ft)
- Lowest elevation: 233 m (764 ft)
- Population (2023): 642
  - Density: 218/km^{2} (564/sq mi)
- Time zone: UTC+01:00 (CET)
  - Summer (DST): UTC+02:00 (CEST)
- INSEE/Postal code: 67092 /67220
- ^{1} French Land Register data, which excludes lakes, ponds, glaciers > 1 km^{2} (0.386 sq mi or 247 acres) and river estuaries.

Dieffenbach-au-Val (German: Diefenbach) is a commune in the Bas-Rhin department in Alsace in north-eastern France.

== See also ==
- Communes of the Bas-Rhin department
