= Saint-Maurice, Bas-Rhin =

Saint-Maurice
- Commune
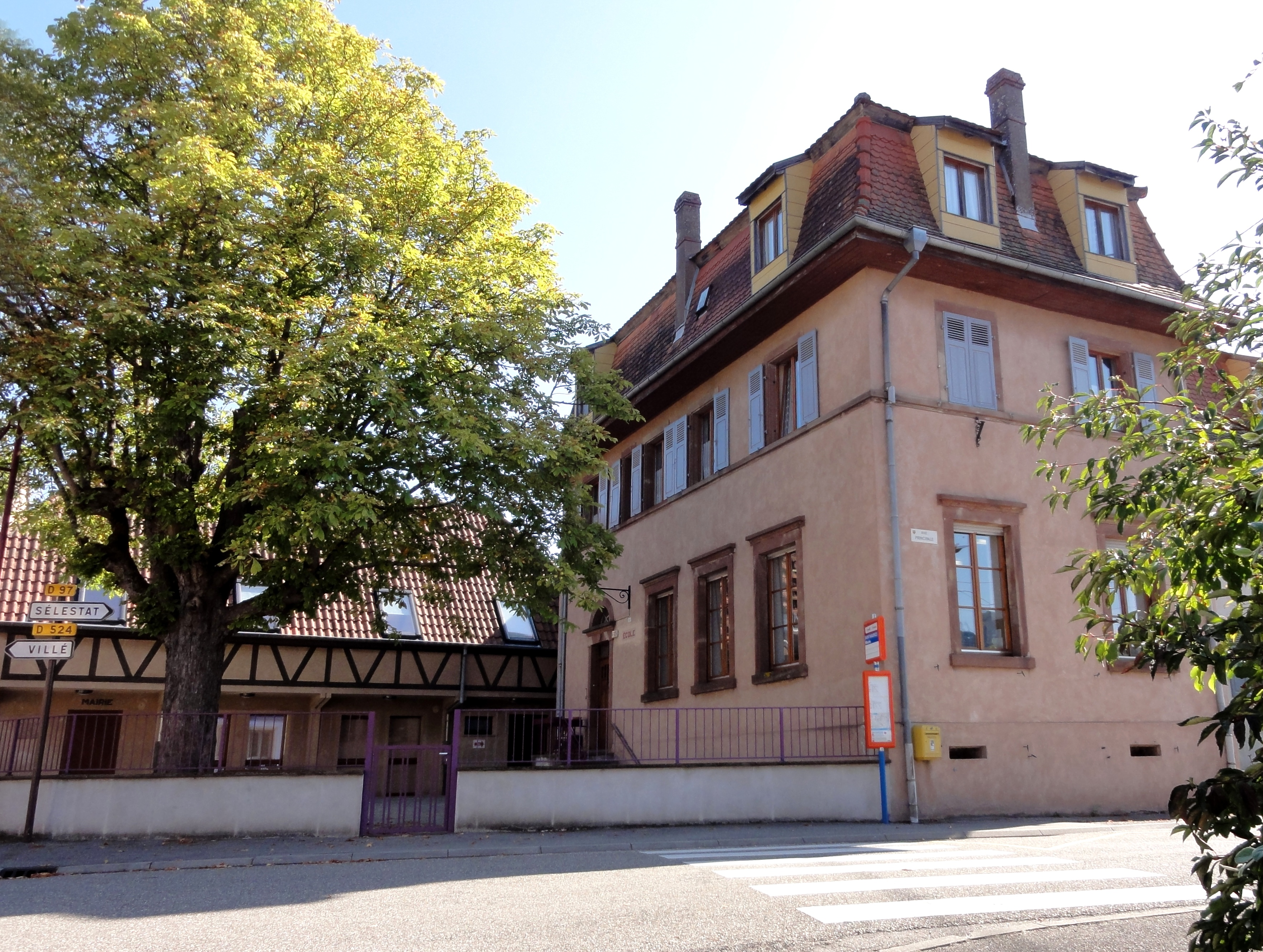
- The town hall in Saint-Maurice

- Coat of arms
- Location of Saint-Maurice
- Location within France Location within Grand Est
- Coordinates: 48°19′43″N 7°20′10″E
- Country: France
- Region: Grand Est
- Department: Bas-Rhin
- Arrondissement: Sélestat-Erstein
- Canton: Mutzig
- Intercommunality: Vallée de Villé

Government
  - Mayor (2020–2026): Jean-Marc Witz
- Area^{1}: 1.4 km^{2} (0.54 sq mi)
- Highest elevation: 335 m (1,099 ft)
- Lowest elevation: 235 m (771 ft)
- Population (2023): 332
  - Density: 240/km^{2} (610/sq mi)
- Time zone: UTC+01:00 (CET)
  - Summer (DST): UTC+02:00 (CEST)
- INSEE/Postal code: 67427 /67220
- ^{1} French Land Register data, which excludes lakes, ponds, glaciers > 1 km^{2} (0.386 sq mi or 247 acres) and river estuaries.

Saint-Maurice (French: [sɛ̃ mɔʁis]; German: Sankt Moritz) is a commune in the Bas-Rhin department in Alsace in north-eastern France.

== See also ==
- Communes of the Bas-Rhin department
