= Saint-Pierre-Bois =

- Commune
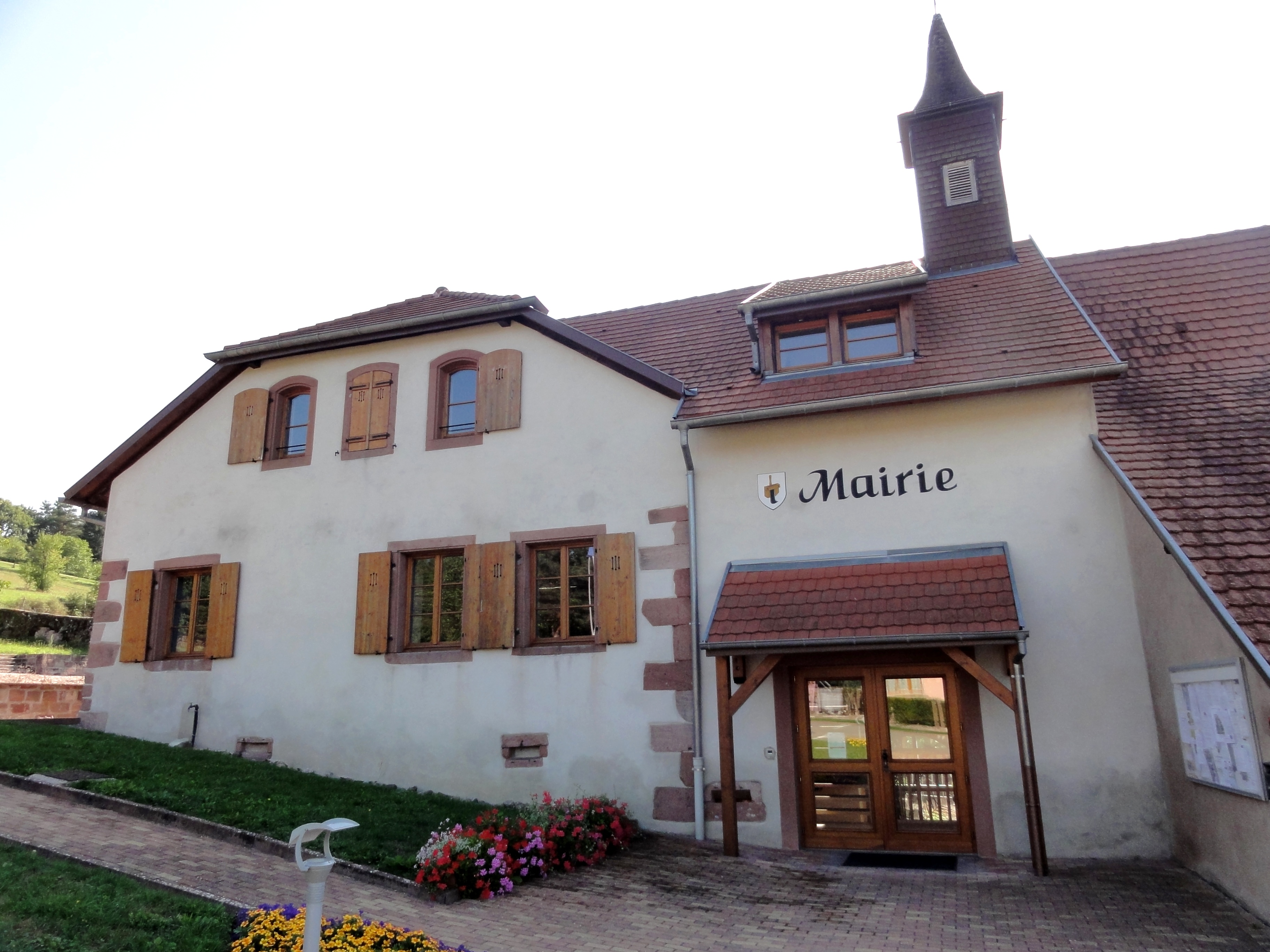
- The town hall in Saint-Pierre-Bois

- Coat of arms
- Location of Saint-Pierre-Bois
- Location within France Location within Grand Est
- Coordinates: 48°20′03″N 7°21′28″E
- Country: France
- Region: Grand Est
- Department: Bas-Rhin
- Arrondissement: Sélestat-Erstein
- Canton: Mutzig

Government
  - Mayor (2020–2026): Alain Meyer
- Area^{1}: 7.3 km^{2} (2.8 sq mi)
- Highest elevation: 550 m (1,800 ft)
- Lowest elevation: 217 m (712 ft)
- Population (2023): 804
  - Density: 110/km^{2} (290/sq mi)
- Time zone: UTC+01:00 (CET)
  - Summer (DST): UTC+02:00 (CEST)
- INSEE/Postal code: 67430 /67220
- ^{1} French Land Register data, which excludes lakes, ponds, glaciers > 1 km^{2} (0.386 sq mi or 247 acres) and river estuaries.

Saint-Pierre-Bois (French pronunciation: [sɛ̃ pjɛʁ bwa]; German: Sankt Petersholz; Alsatian: Sàm Peterschulz) is a commune in the Bas-Rhin department in Alsace in north-eastern France.

== See also ==
- Communes of the Bas-Rhin department
