= Neubois =

Neubois Grit
- Commune
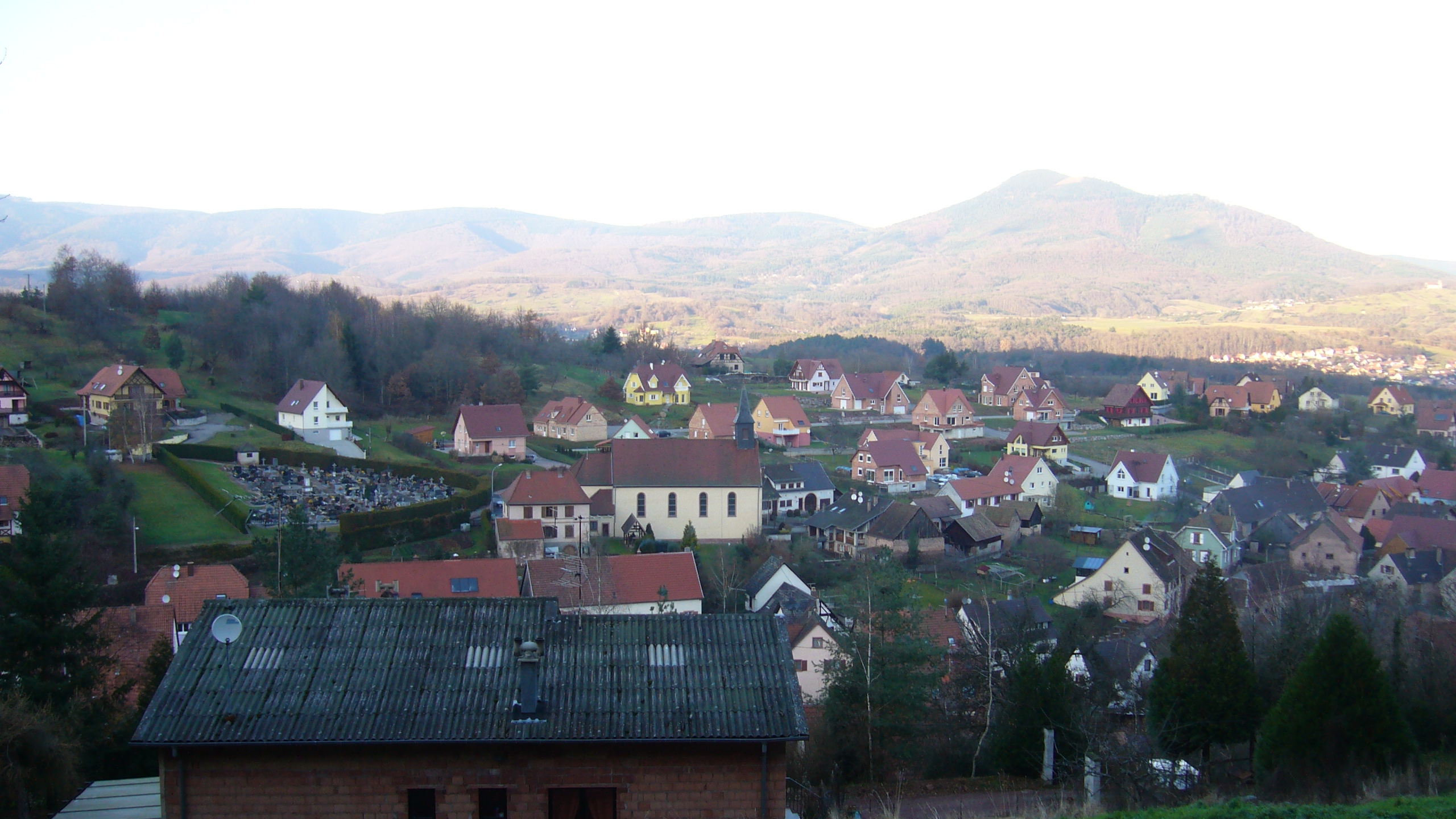
- A general view of Neubois

- Coat of arms
- Location of Neubois
- Location within France Location within Grand Est
- Coordinates: 48°18′25″N 7°20′23″E
- Country: France
- Region: Grand Est
- Department: Bas-Rhin
- Arrondissement: Sélestat-Erstein
- Canton: Mutzig
- Intercommunality: Vallée de Villé

Government
  - Mayor (2020–2026): Marie Odile Uhlerich
- Area^{1}: 11.42 km^{2} (4.41 sq mi)
- Highest elevation: 855 m (2,805 ft)
- Lowest elevation: 219 m (719 ft)
- Population (2023): 646
  - Density: 56.6/km^{2} (147/sq mi)
- Time zone: UTC+01:00 (CET)
  - Summer (DST): UTC+02:00 (CEST)
- INSEE/Postal code: 67317 /67220
- ^{1} French Land Register data, which excludes lakes, ponds, glaciers > 1 km^{2} (0.386 sq mi or 247 acres) and river estuaries.

Neubois (French pronunciation: [nøbwa]; German: Gereuth) is a commune in the Bas-Rhin department in Alsace in north-eastern France.

== See also ==
- Communes of the Bas-Rhin department
