= Blancherupt =

- Commune
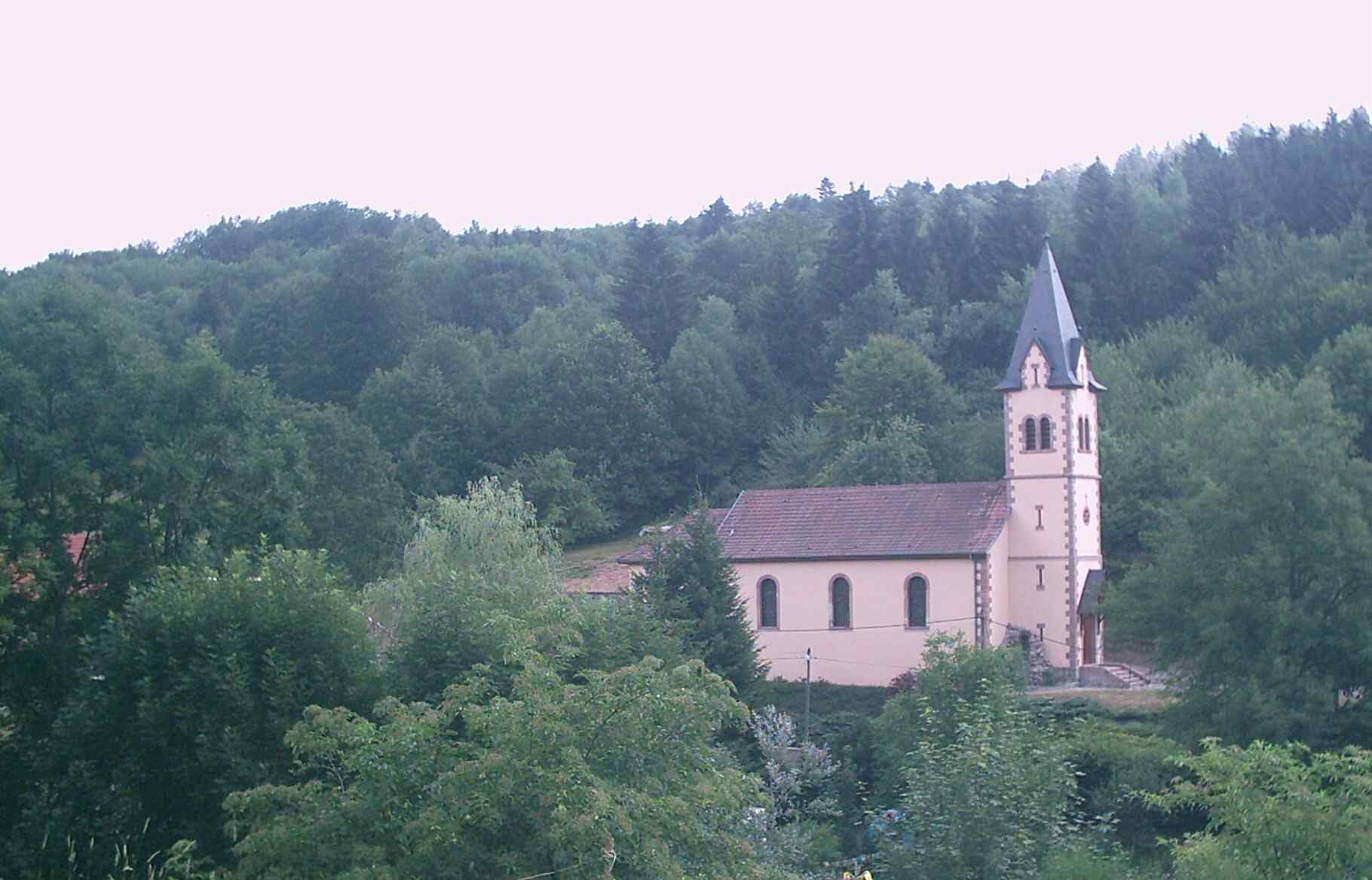
- The church in Blancherupt

- Coat of arms
- Location of Blancherupt
- Location within France Location within Grand Est
- Coordinates: 48°24′34″N 7°11′37″E
- Country: France
- Region: Grand Est
- Department: Bas-Rhin
- Arrondissement: Molsheim
- Canton: Mutzig

Government
  - Mayor (2020–2026): Sylvie Krouch
- Area^{1}: 2.65 km^{2} (1.02 sq mi)
- Highest elevation: 730 m (2,400 ft)
- Lowest elevation: 440 m (1,440 ft)
- Population (2023): 29
  - Density: 11/km^{2} (28/sq mi)
- Time zone: UTC+01:00 (CET)
  - Summer (DST): UTC+02:00 (CEST)
- INSEE/Postal code: 67050 /67130
- ^{1} French Land Register data, which excludes lakes, ponds, glaciers > 1 km^{2} (0.386 sq mi or 247 acres) and river estuaries.

Blancherupt (French pronunciation: [blɑ̃ʃʁy]; German: Bliensbach) is a commune in the Bas-Rhin department in Grand Est in northeastern France.

== Population ==
Historical population
Year	Pop.	±% p.a.
1968	36	—
1975	31	−2.11%
1982	32	+0.45%
1990	30	−0.80%
1999	31	+0.36%
2007	31	+0.00%
2012	38	+4.16%
2017	38	+0.00%
2023	29	−4.40%
Source: INSEE

== See also ==
- Communes of the Bas-Rhin department
