= Ranrupt =

- Commune
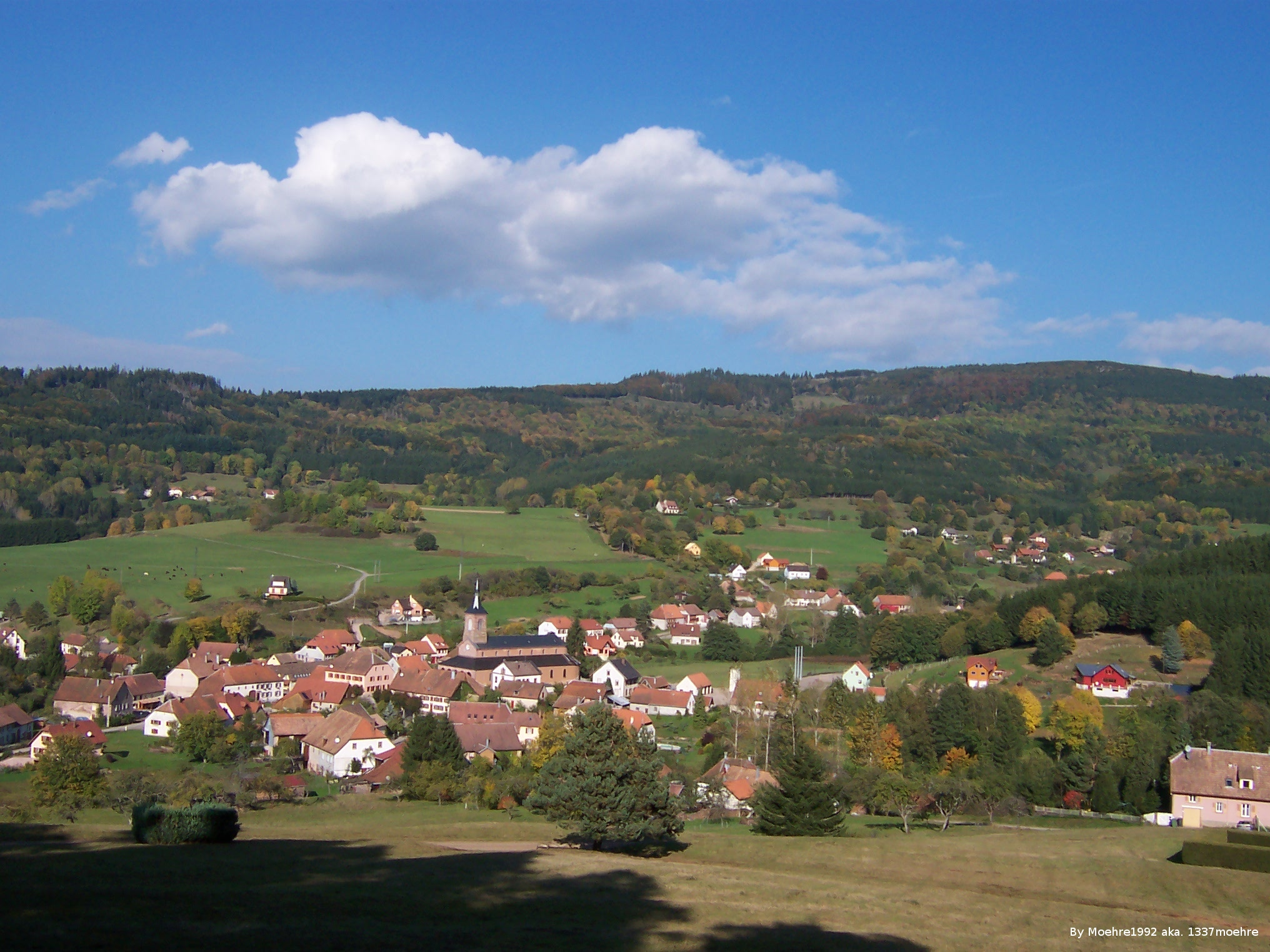
- A general view of Ranrupt

- Coat of arms
- Location of Ranrupt
- Location within France Location within Grand Est
- Coordinates: 48°22′31″N 7°11′57″E
- Country: France
- Region: Grand Est
- Department: Bas-Rhin
- Arrondissement: Molsheim
- Canton: Mutzig

Government
  - Mayor (2020–2026): Thierry Sieffer
- Area^{1}: 14.68 km^{2} (5.67 sq mi)
- Highest elevation: 1,013 m (3,323 ft)
- Lowest elevation: 476 m (1,562 ft)
- Population (2023): 312
  - Density: 21.3/km^{2} (55.0/sq mi)
- Time zone: UTC+01:00 (CET)
  - Summer (DST): UTC+02:00 (CEST)
- INSEE/Postal code: 67384 /67420
- ^{1} French Land Register data, which excludes lakes, ponds, glaciers > 1 km^{2} (0.386 sq mi or 247 acres) and river estuaries.

Ranrupt (French pronunciation: [ʁɑ̃ʁy]; German: Roggensbach) is a commune in the Bas-Rhin department in Grand Est in north-eastern France.

== See also ==
- Communes of the Bas-Rhin department
