= Colroy-la-Roche =

- Commune
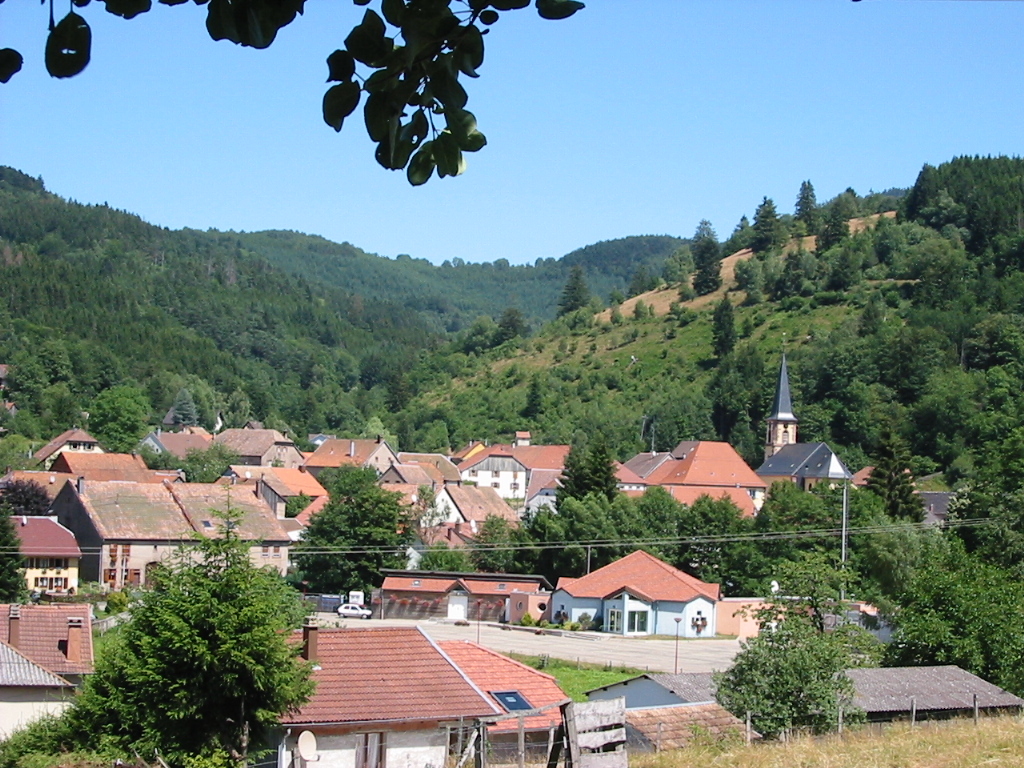
- A general view of Colroy-la-Roche

- Coat of arms
- Location of Colroy-la-Roche
- Location within France Location within Grand Est
- Coordinates: 48°23′28″N 7°10′57″E
- Country: France
- Region: Grand Est
- Department: Bas-Rhin
- Arrondissement: Molsheim
- Canton: Mutzig

Government
  - Mayor (2020–2026): Emile Fluck
- Area^{1}: 8.18 km^{2} (3.16 sq mi)
- Highest elevation: 730 m (2,400 ft)
- Lowest elevation: 422 m (1,385 ft)
- Population (2023): 473
  - Density: 57.8/km^{2} (150/sq mi)
- Time zone: UTC+01:00 (CET)
  - Summer (DST): UTC+02:00 (CEST)
- INSEE/Postal code: 67076 /67420
- ^{1} French Land Register data, which excludes lakes, ponds, glaciers > 1 km^{2} (0.386 sq mi or 247 acres) and river estuaries.

Colroy-la-Roche (French pronunciation: [kɔlʁwa la ʁɔʃ]; German: Kolrein) is a commune in the Bas-Rhin department in Grand Est in north-eastern France.

== See also ==
- Communes of the Bas-Rhin department
