= Saales =

- Commune
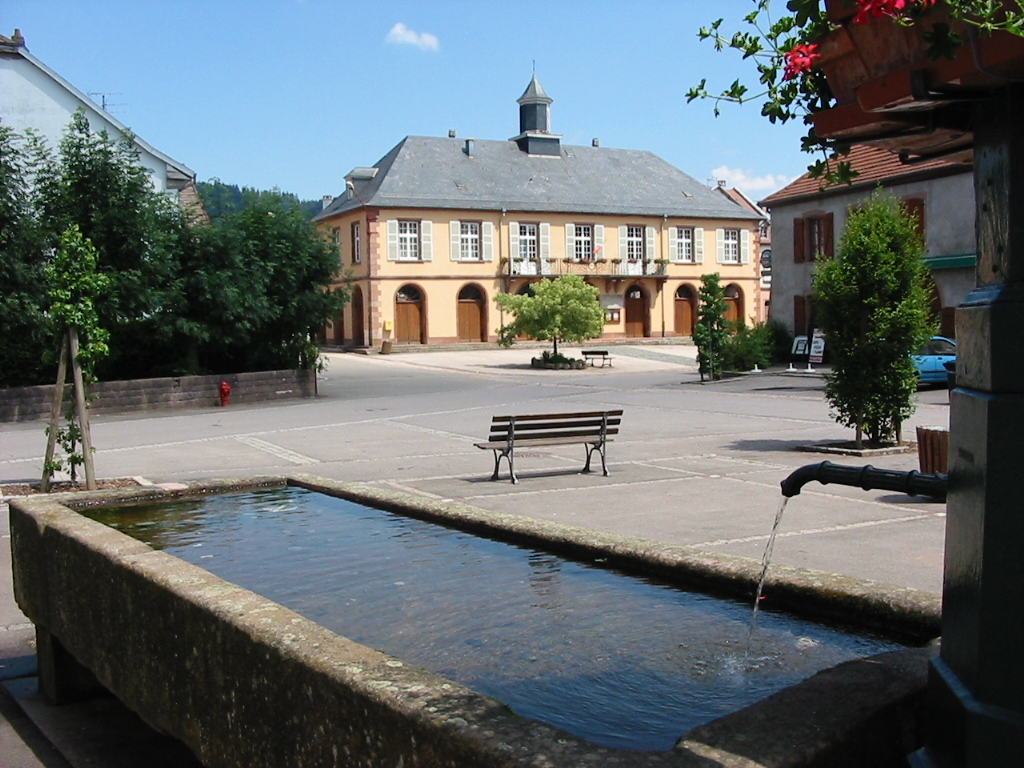
- Town hall

- Coat of arms
- Location of Saales
- Location within France Location within Grand Est
- Coordinates: 48°20′57″N 7°06′23″E
- Country: France
- Region: Grand Est
- Department: Bas-Rhin
- Arrondissement: Molsheim
- Canton: Mutzig
- Intercommunality: Vallée de la Bruche

Government
  - Mayor (2020–2026): Romain Mangenet
- Area^{1}: 9.88 km^{2} (3.81 sq mi)
- Elevation: 555 m (1,821 ft)
- Highest elevation: 831 m (2,726 ft)
- Lowest elevation: 517 m (1,696 ft)
- Population (2023): 826
  - Density: 83.6/km^{2} (217/sq mi)
- Time zone: UTC+01:00 (CET)
  - Summer (DST): UTC+02:00 (CEST)
- INSEE/Postal code: 67421 /67420
- ^{1} French Land Register data, which excludes lakes, ponds, glaciers > 1 km^{2} (0.386 sq mi or 247 acres) and river estuaries.

Saales (French pronunciation: [sal]; German: Saal) is a commune in the Bas-Rhin department in Grand Est in north-eastern France.

== Geography and geology ==
Saales is at the center of a two kilometer long plateau with an average elevation of 560 meters. It sits on the Fraize creek. The village is located at an elevation of 556 meters, and rests at the base of Sapinsus. The highest point is on the 'Rocher des Enfants', to the right of Solamont, and the lowest point is near the road at the beginning of the Hang Bruche Valley.

== Population ==
Historical population
Year	Pop.	±% p.a.
1968	905	—
1975	830	−1.23%
1982	780	−0.88%
1990	779	−0.02%
1999	853	+1.01%
2007	940	+1.22%
2012	820	−2.69%
2017	837	+0.41%
2023	826	−0.22%
Source: INSEE

== See also ==
- Communes of the Bas-Rhin department
