= Saulxures, Bas-Rhin =

Saulxures
- Commune
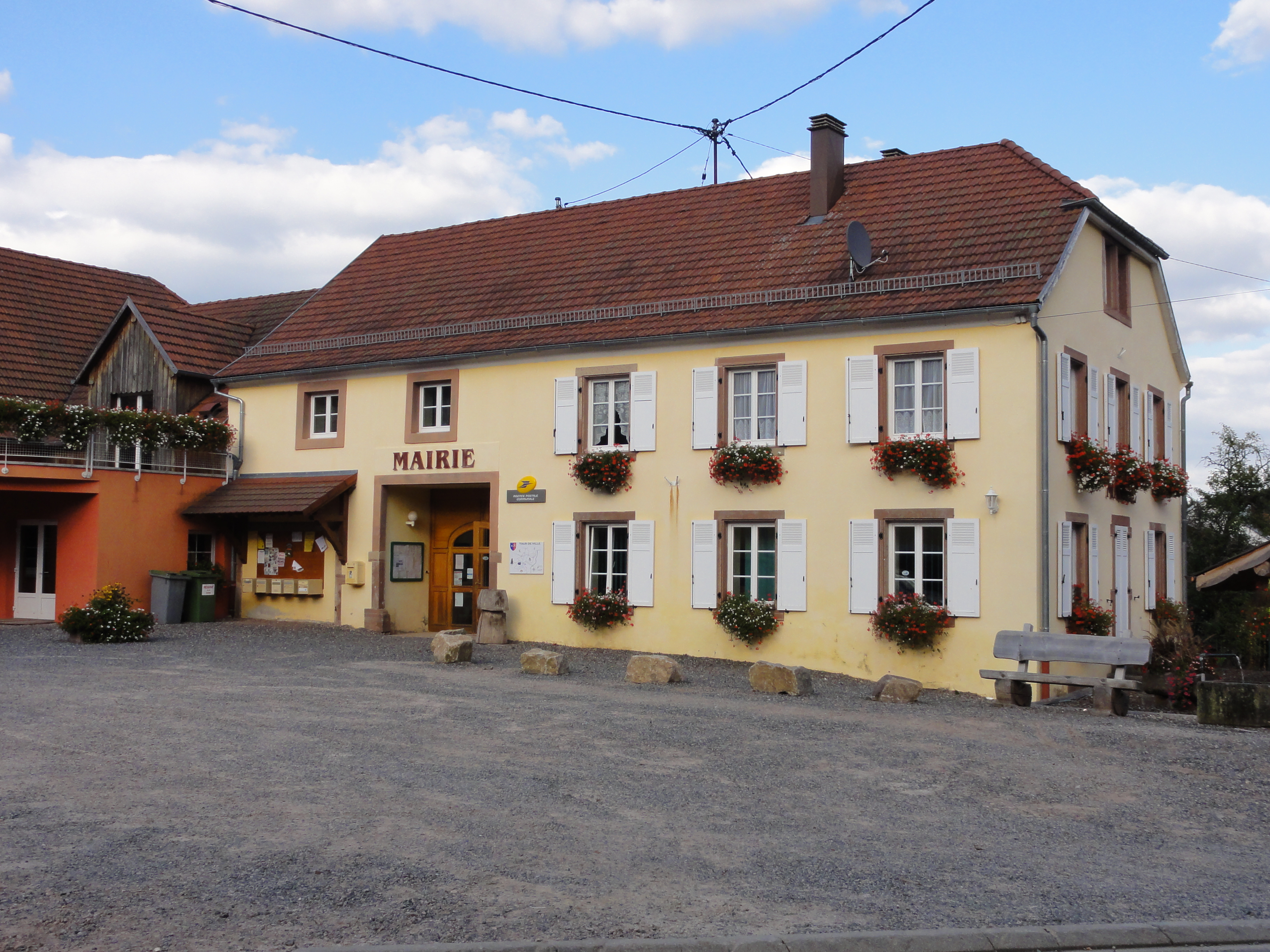
- The town hall in Saulxures

- Coat of arms
- Location of Saulxures
- Location within France Location within Grand Est
- Coordinates: 48°23′34″N 7°07′55″E
- Country: France
- Region: Grand Est
- Department: Bas-Rhin
- Arrondissement: Molsheim
- Canton: Mutzig

Government
  - Mayor (2020–2026): Hubert Herry
- Area^{1}: 12.84 km^{2} (4.96 sq mi)
- Highest elevation: 812 m (2,664 ft)
- Lowest elevation: 420 m (1,380 ft)
- Population (2023): 508
  - Density: 39.6/km^{2} (102/sq mi)
- Time zone: UTC+01:00 (CET)
  - Summer (DST): UTC+02:00 (CEST)
- INSEE/Postal code: 67436 /67420
- ^{1} French Land Register data, which excludes lakes, ponds, glaciers > 1 km^{2} (0.386 sq mi or 247 acres) and river estuaries.

Saulxures (German: Salzern) is a commune in the Bas-Rhin department in Grand Est in north-eastern France.

== See also ==
- Communes of the Bas-Rhin department
