= Iron (metaphor) =

Iron, when used metaphorically, refers to certain traits of the metal iron. Used as an adjective and sometimes as a noun, it refers to something stern, harsh, strong, unyielding, inflexible, rigid, sturdy, strong, robust, hard.

== List of iron metaphors ==
=== Persons and characters ===
- Iron Duke (disambiguation)
- Iron Felix (disambiguation)
- Iron Lady (disambiguation)
- Iron Man (disambiguation)
- Iron Mike (disambiguation)
- Princess Iron Fan (disambiguation)
- Otto von Bismarck, known as the Iron Chancellor
- Iron Chef, a Japanese cooking show
- Joseph LaFlesche, known as Iron Eye
- Iron Eyes Cody, Sicilian-American actor
- The Iron Heinrich, a rough translation of the German fairy tale The Frog Prince
- Iron Heroes, a variant book of rules for the game Dungeons & Dragons
- Iron John, a German fairy tale
- Eon Kid, English title of the TV series Iron Kid
- Iron Lad, a fictional superhero
- Iron Maniac, an evil alternative universe character of fictional Marvel superhero Iron Man
- Iron Munro, a fictional superhero
- Persephone, known as the Iron Queen
- Hossein Khosrow Ali Vaziri, known as the Iron Sheik
- Iron Shell, Brule Sioux chief
- Iron Tail, Oglala Sioux warrior
- Tigran Petrosian, known as Iron Tigran
- Timur as a name, meaning iron in Turkic languages, widespread in Western and Central Asia since the days of the Mongol Empire
- Hadid is an Arabic name (both given and surname) literally meaning "iron"

=== Animals and plants ===
- Iron Bird (disambiguation)
- Iron Butterfly (disambiguation)
- Iron Dragon (disambiguation)
- Iron Eagle (disambiguation)
- Iron Monkey (disambiguation)
- Iron Wolf (disambiguation)
- Iron horse (disambiguation)
- Iron wood (disambiguation)
- Ferrocalamus (iron bamboo)
- Iron cobra, a "construct" in the game Dungeons & Dragons
- Iron condor, an option trading strategy utilizing two vertical spreads
- Iron Kong, a fictional character from the science fiction media franchise Zoids

=== Body parts ===
- Iron Fist (disambiguation)
- Iron Hand (disambiguation)
- Iron Hands (disambiguation)
- Iron lung (disambiguation)
- See Joseph LaFlesche
- The Iron Heel, a 1908 dystopian novel
- Iron Palm, a body of training techniques in various Chinese martial arts

=== Geography ===
- Iron City (disambiguation)
- Iron Mountain (disambiguation)
- Iron River (disambiguation)
- Iron Range, regions around Lake Superior in the United States and Canada

=== Other iron metaphors ===
- Iron Bird (disambiguation)
- Iron Curtain (disambiguation)
- Iron Maiden (disambiguation)
- Iron Triangle (disambiguation)
- Unguided bomb, known as an iron bomb
- Iron Brigade, a Civil War brigade
- Iron cage, a sociology term
- Iron Fire, a Danish power and speed metal band
- Iron Guard, a historical far-right movement in Romania
- Iron harvest, an annual "harvest" collected by Belgian and French farmers after ploughing their fields
- Iron Helix, a 1993 video game
- Iron Seed, a 1994 DOS video game
- Iron shirt, a form of hard style martial art exercise
- Iron Sunrise, a 2004 hard science fiction novel
- Iron Will, a 1994 film

== Gallery ==
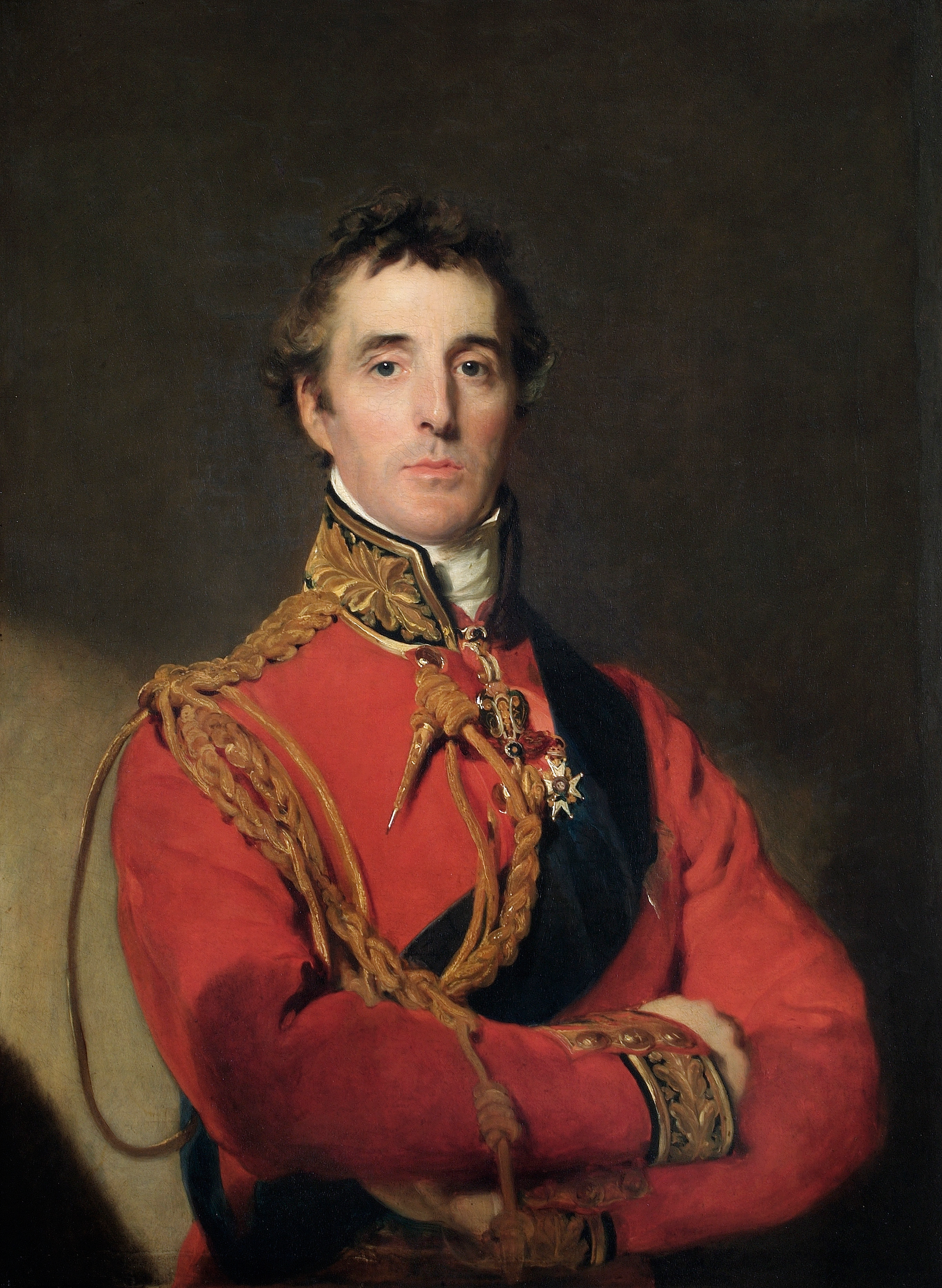
The Iron Duke

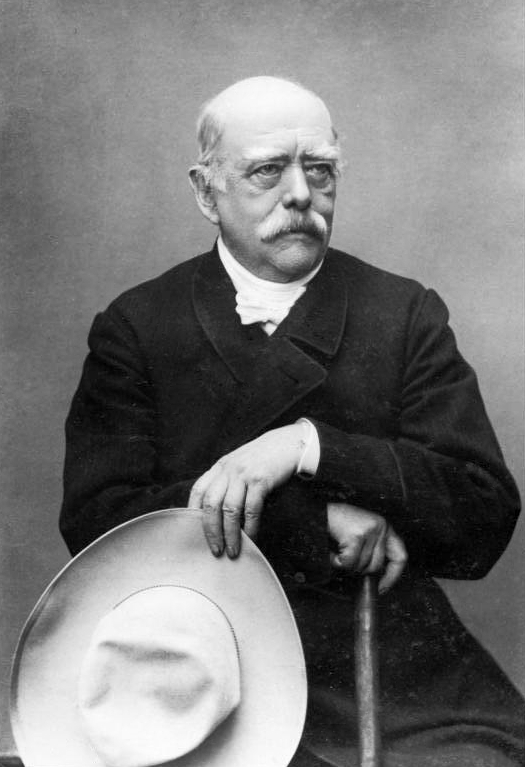
The Iron Chancellor

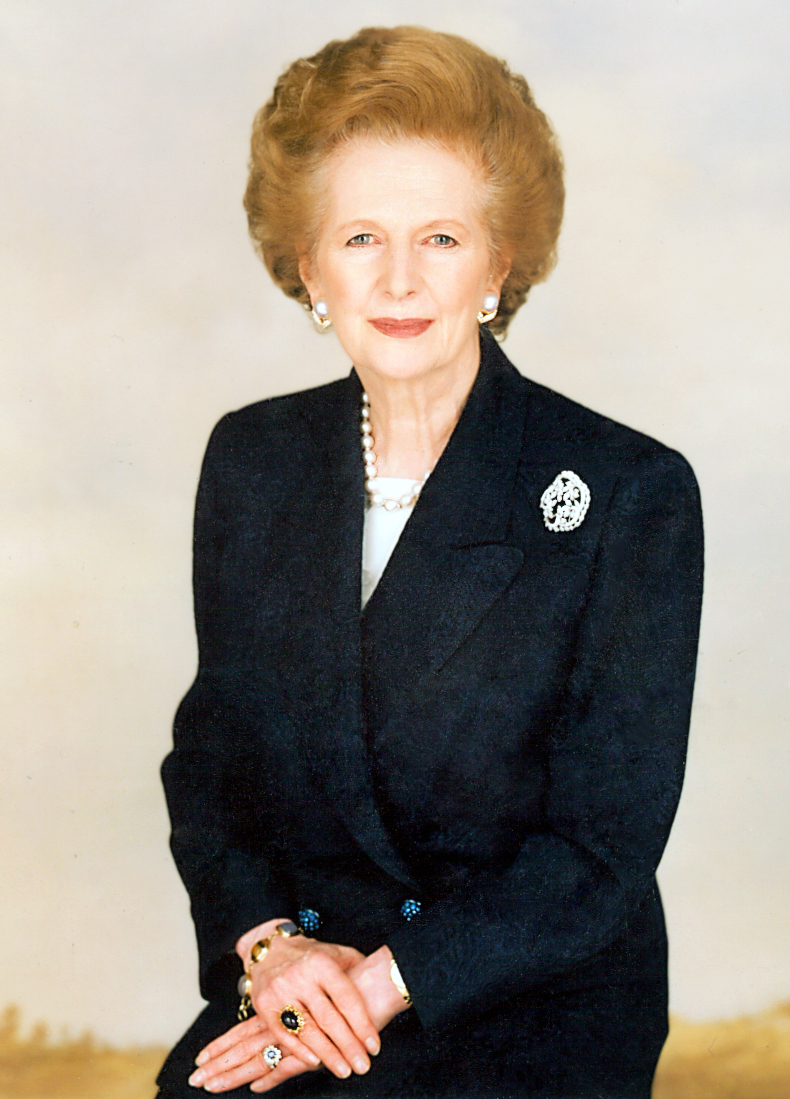
Margaret Thatcher, the Iron Lady

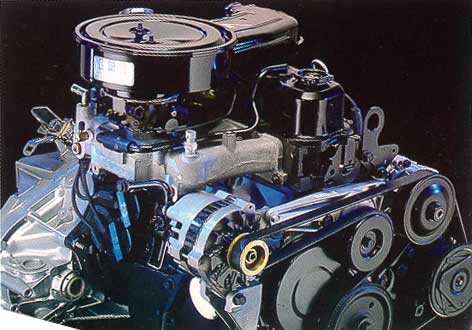
An Iron Duke engine

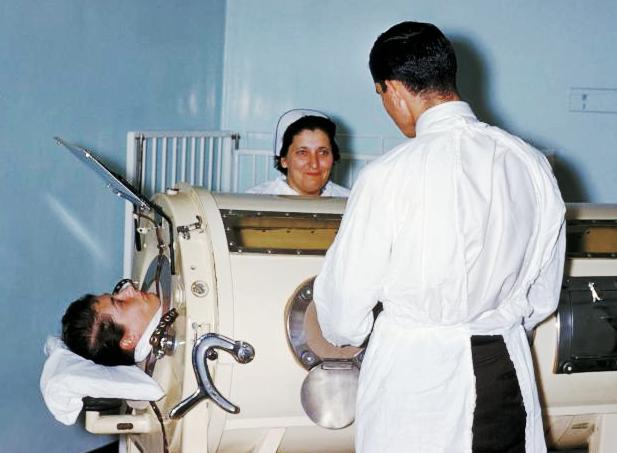
An iron lung

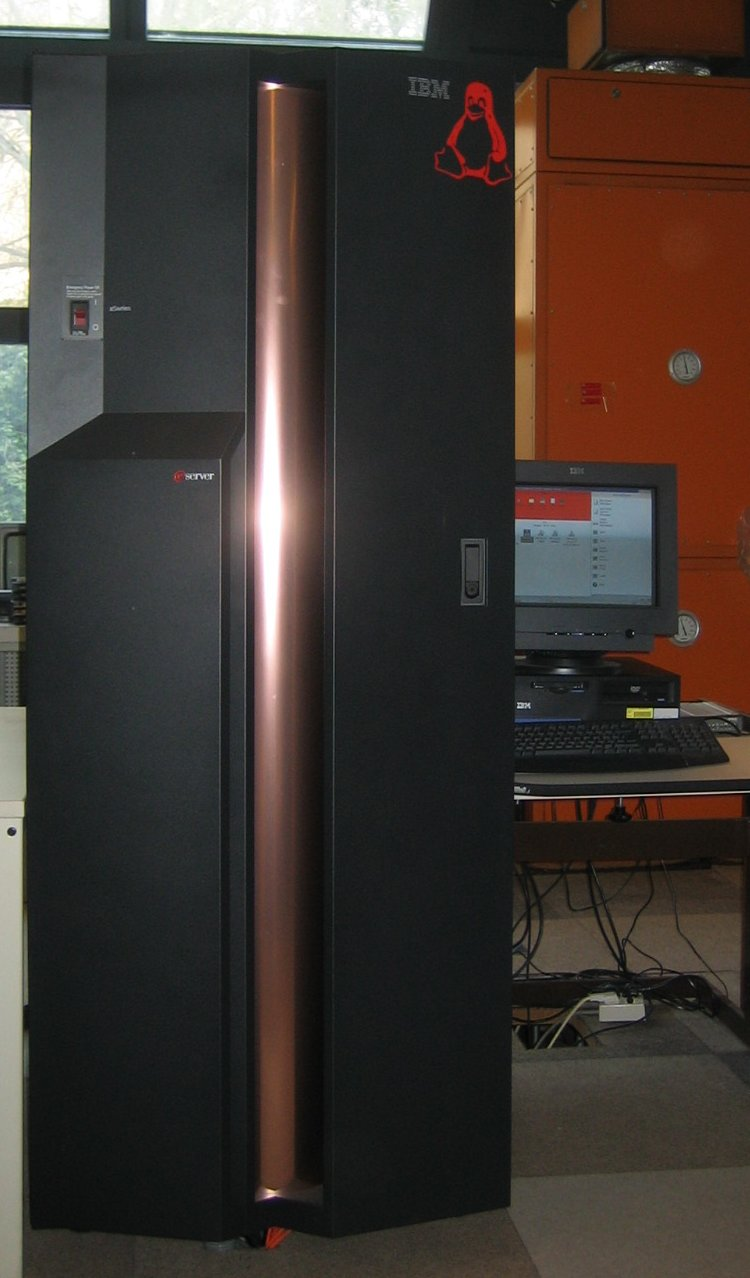
Big iron, an IBM z800 2066 mainframe

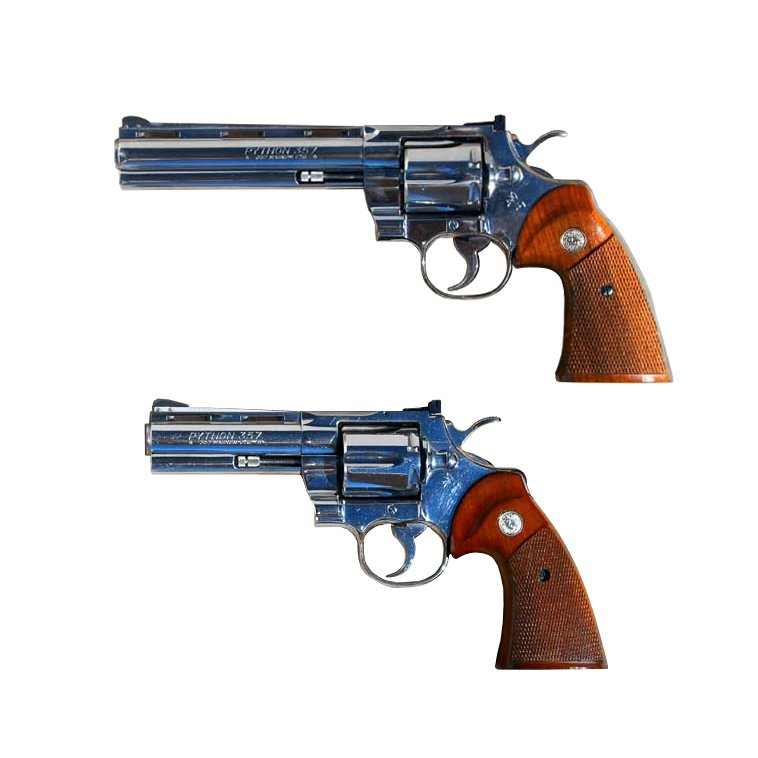
"Big Iron" or Colt Python

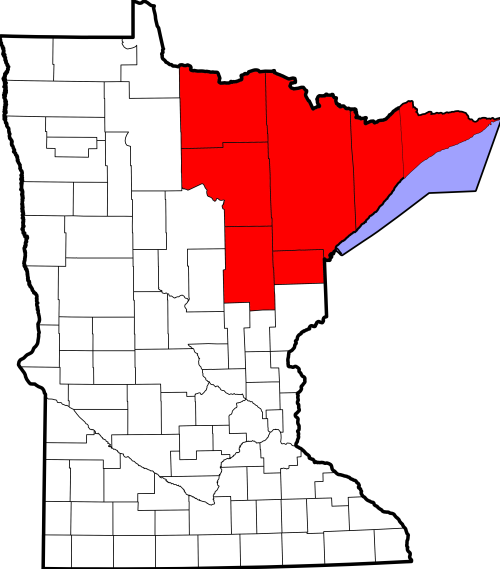
Iron Range in Minnesota

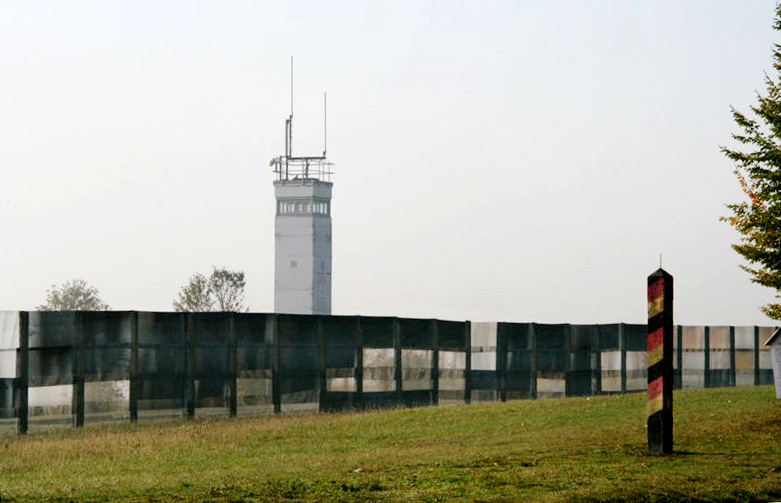
The Iron Curtain in modern-day Germany

== See also ==
- Iron (disambiguation)
- Big Iron, a country ballad
- The dictionary definition of iron at Wiktionary
