= Balbronn =

- Commune
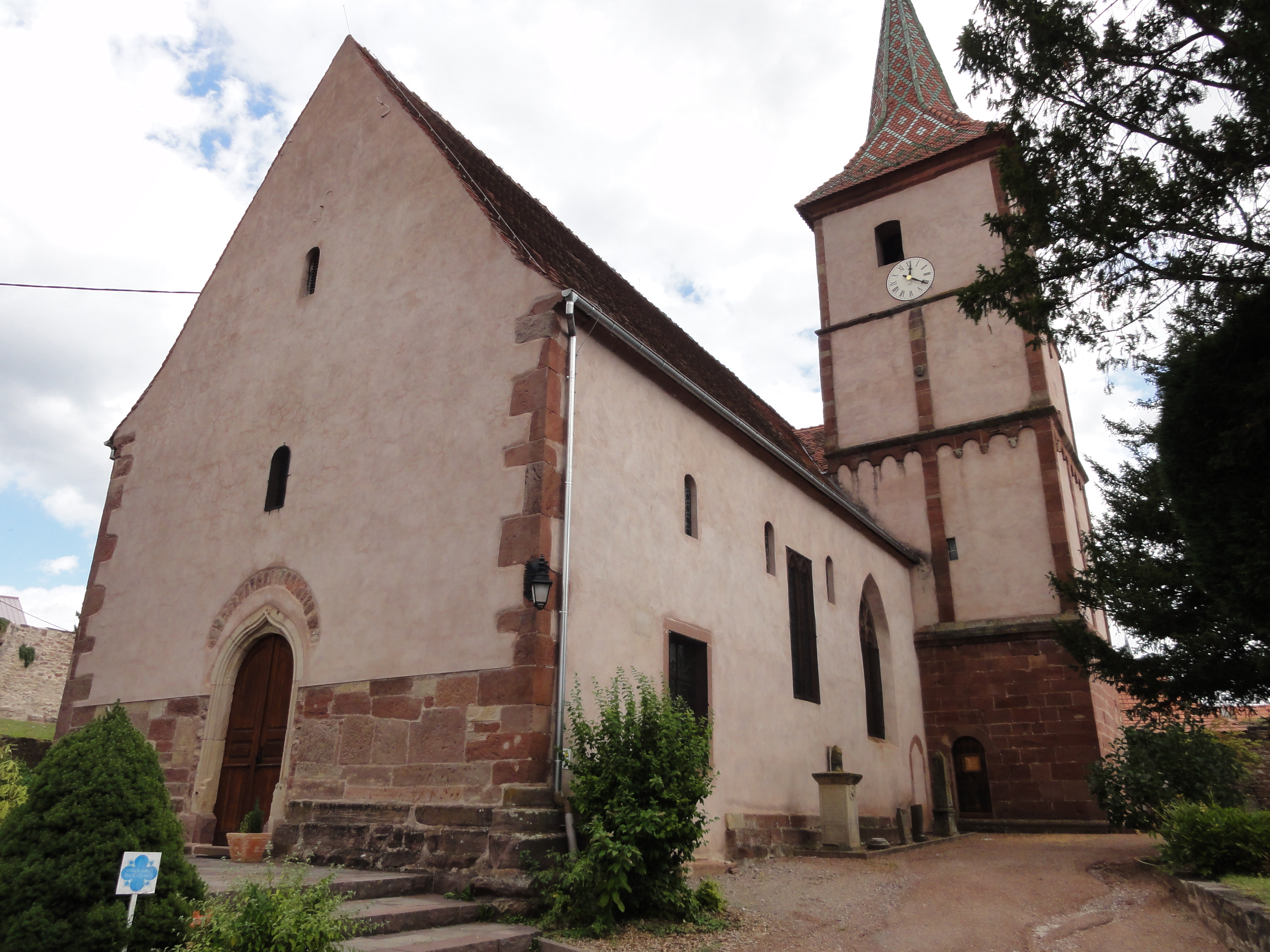
- The Protestant church in Balbronn

- Coat of arms
- Location of Balbronn
- Location within France Location within Grand Est
- Coordinates: 48°35′04″N 7°26′16″E
- Country: France
- Region: Grand Est
- Department: Bas-Rhin
- Arrondissement: Molsheim
- Canton: Saverne

Government
  - Mayor (2020–2026): Daniel Reutenauer
- Area^{1}: 10.18 km^{2} (3.93 sq mi)
- Highest elevation: 450 m (1,480 ft)
- Lowest elevation: 209 m (686 ft)
- Population (2023): 681
  - Density: 66.9/km^{2} (173/sq mi)
- Time zone: UTC+01:00 (CET)
  - Summer (DST): UTC+02:00 (CEST)
- INSEE/Postal code: 67018 /67310
- ^{1} French Land Register data, which excludes lakes, ponds, glaciers > 1 km^{2} (0.386 sq mi or 247 acres) and river estuaries.

Balbronn (French pronunciation: [balbʁɔn]; German: Ballbronn) is a commune in the Bas-Rhin department in the Grand Est region of north-eastern France.

== Geography ==
Balbronn is located some 25 kilometres west of Strasbourg and 8 km south-west of Wasselonne. Access to the commune is by the D75 road from Westhoffen in the north which passes through the village and continues west through the commune then south-west to Oberhaslach. The D275 goes from the village south-east to Bergbieten. The commune is mostly farmland but with large forests north of the D75 in the west of the commune.

Le Schleithal river flows south through the forests in the west and continues south through the commune to join the Bruche at Dinsheim-sur-Bruche. The Niedermattgraben rises near the village and flows south-east to join the Kehlbach east of Bergbieten.

== History ==
In his chronicle, Hertzog describes Balbronn as a Staettlin (small town). The church is very old. Inside it is a headstone from 1574 containing the remains of Jean de Mittelhausen and his wife Barbe Hufel.

In the forests in the west of Balbronn there was once a village called Elbersforst which was in a large clearing in the forest where there is now the Auberge d'Elemerforst. A plaque indicates that the place is the property of the Notre Dame works. Stones from the old village can still be seen above the restaurant patio. These are the old foundations of several buildings of what was formerly called Elbersforst. Since 2007 this medieval town has been the subject of archaeological excavations. Elbersforst was part of Westhoffen which depended on Marmourtier Abbey.

=== Heraldry ===
Arms of Balbronn	Blazon: Gules, a fountain Argent between four roses of Or set 2 and 2. These are Canting arms based on Bronn, a derivative of Brunne meaning "fountain" in German.

== Administration ==
List of Successive Mayors

From	To	Name	Party	Position
2001	2026	Daniel Reutenauer		Policy officer

== Demography ==
The inhabitants of the commune are known as Balbronnais or Balbronnaises in French.

Historical population

Year	Pop.	±% p.a.
1793	935	—
1800	904	−0.48%
1806	921	+0.31%
1821	993	+0.50%
1831	1,103	+1.06%
1836	1,081	−0.40%
1841	1,076	−0.09%
1846	1,140	+1.16%
1851	1,093	−0.84%
1856	994	−1.88%
1861	1,033	+0.77%
1866	1,062	+0.56%
1871	1,019	−0.82%
1875	1,010	−0.22%
1880	994	−0.32%
1885	1,014	+0.40%
1890	1,028	+0.27%
1895	1,003	−0.49%
1900	905	−2.04%

Year	Pop.	±% p.a.
1905	885	−0.45%
1910	852	−0.76%
1921	687	−1.94%
1926	652	−1.04%
1931	642	−0.31%
1936	639	−0.09%
1946	618	−0.33%
1954	589	−0.60%
1962	594	+0.11%
1968	600	+0.17%
1975	587	−0.31%
1982	563	−0.59%
1990	581	+0.39%
1999	602	+0.40%
2007	649	+0.94%
2012	634	−0.47%
2017	656	+0.68%
2023	681	+0.63%

Source: EHESS and INSEE

== Culture and heritage ==
=== Civil heritage ===
The commune has many buildings and sites that are registered as historical monuments:

- A Jewish House (1628) at 47-48 Rue Balbach
- Farmhouses (14th-19th century)
- A Chateau at Rue du Chateau (15th century)
- The Town Hall/School at 63 Place de la Mairie (1897)
- A Protestant School at 170 Place du Pasteur-Albert-Kiefer (1834)
- A Merchant's House at 29 Rue des Tonneliers (19th century)
- A Forester's House at Elmersforst (1755)

=== Religious heritage ===
The commune has several religious buildings and structures that are registered as historical monuments:

- A Synagogue (disused) at Rue des Femmes (1895)
- A Protestant Presbytery 173 Rue du Fossé (1732). The Presbytery contains 2 communion ewers (18th century) which are registered as an historical object.
- A Protestant Church at Place du Pasteur-Albert-Kiefer (12th century)
- The Parish Church of Saint-Catherine at Rue de Westhoffen (20th century). The church contains many items that are registered as historical objects:
  - The Furniture in the Church
  - A Chalice with Paten and Spoon (19th century)
  - A Painting: Saint Catherine (19th century)
  - A Eucharistic Cabinet (1453)
  - A Baptismal font (1687)
  - The main Altar (19th century)
  - 3 Stained glass windows (1905)
  - A Monumental Cross (18th century)
- The Interdenominational Cemetery at Rue de Westhoffen (1882)
- The Church and Cemetery of Balbronn (12th century). The Cemetery contains a Cemetery Cross (19th century) which is registered as an historical object.

== Notable people linked to the commune ==
- Louis Albert Kiefer, pastor from 1873 to 1913, the date of his death, author of the book: Die geschichte Balbronn, 1894.

== See also ==
- Communes of the Bas-Rhin department
