= Götz von Berlichingen (disambiguation) =

Götz von Berlichingen (1480–1562), also known as Götz of the Iron Hand, was a German Imperial Knight, mercenary, and poet.

Götz von Berlichingen may also refer to:

- Götz von Berlichingen (Goethe), a 1773 drama by Johann Wolfgang von Goethe
- Götz von Berlichingen, an 1883 concert overture for orchestra by Paul Dukas
- Goetz von Berlichingen of the Iron Hand (1925 film), a 1925 German silent film
- Goetz von Berlichingen (film), a 1955 Austrian film
- Goetz von Berlichingen of the Iron Hand (1979 film), a 1979 German-Yugoslavian film

== See also ==
- 17th SS Panzergrenadier Division Götz von Berlichingen
- Iron Hand (disambiguation)
