= Église protestante de Balbronn =

Church in Bas-Rhin, France

Coordinates: 48°35′05″N 7°26′16″E

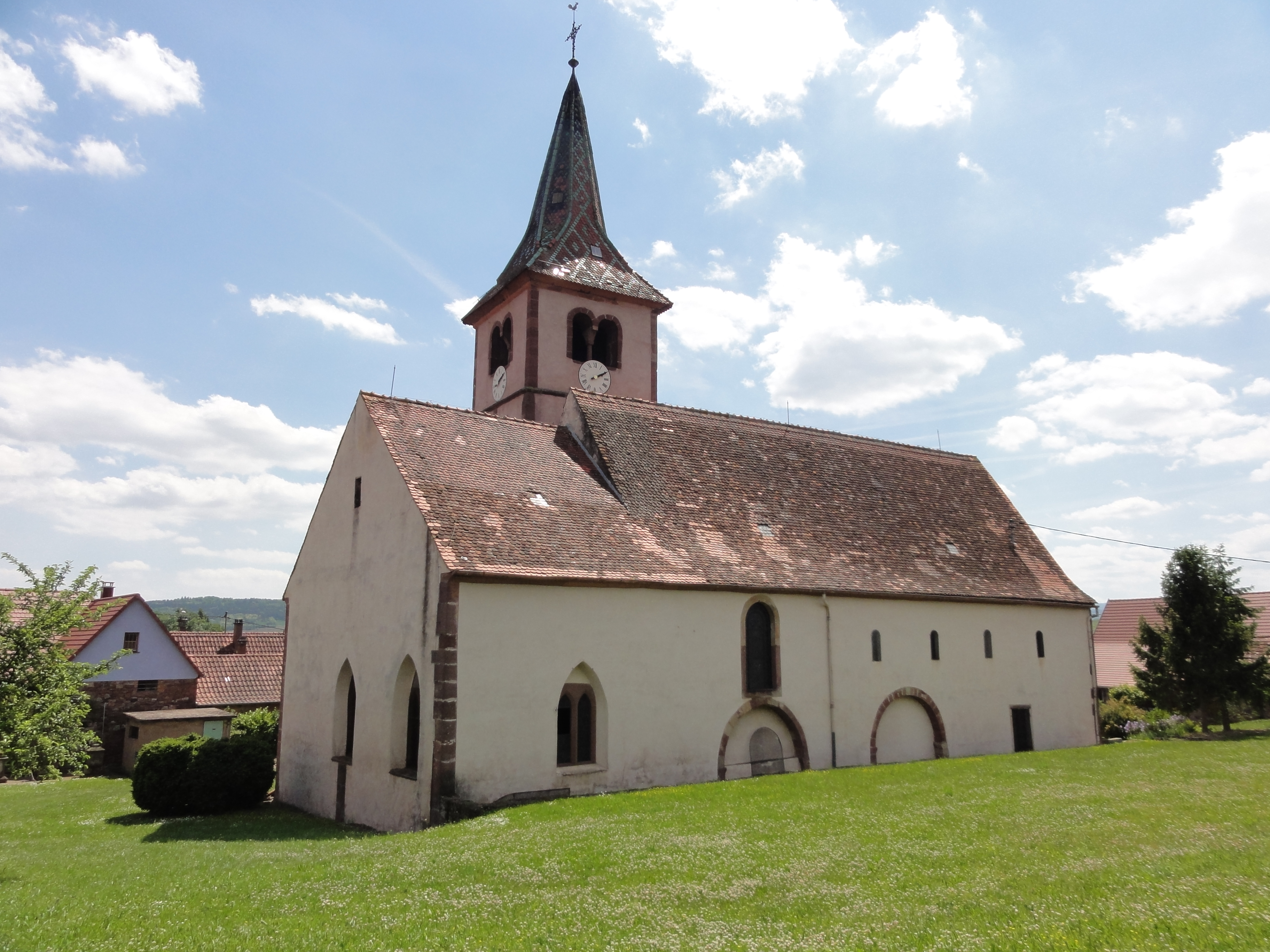
Église protestante de Balbronn

Église protestante de Balbronn is a Lutheran church (EPCAAL) in Balbronn, Bas-Rhin, Alsace, France. Originally dated to the 12th century, it became a registered Monument historique in 1990. It contains the prosthetic hand and arm of Knight Hans von Mittelhausen.

== Registered objects ==
The church contains many items that are registered as historical objects:

  - A Bronze Bell (1552)
  - A Bronze Bell (2) (1846)
  - A Prosthetic Hand and Arm (copy) (1552)
  - The Furniture in the Church
  - An Organ (1747)
  - A Chalice with Paten and Protestant Host Box (1895)
  - A Protestant Chalice with Paten (19th century)
  - 2 Communion Ewers (18th century)
  - A Baptismal Basin and Ewer (1887)
  - A Protestant Begging Trunk (15th century)
  - A Pastoral Chair (20th century)
  - A Stained glass window: Frédéric Barberousse (1908)
  - A Stained glass window: Christ in Glory (1908)
  - A Funeral Monument for Euphrosine von Schauwenburg (1605)
  - A Funeral Monument for Catharina Muller (1828)
  - A Funeral Monument for Anna Maria Fasco (1773)
  - A Funeral Monument for Pastor Johannes Haüss (17th century)
  - A Pilaster (12th century)
  - Culots (Ornamental Strips) (12th century)

=== Gallery ===
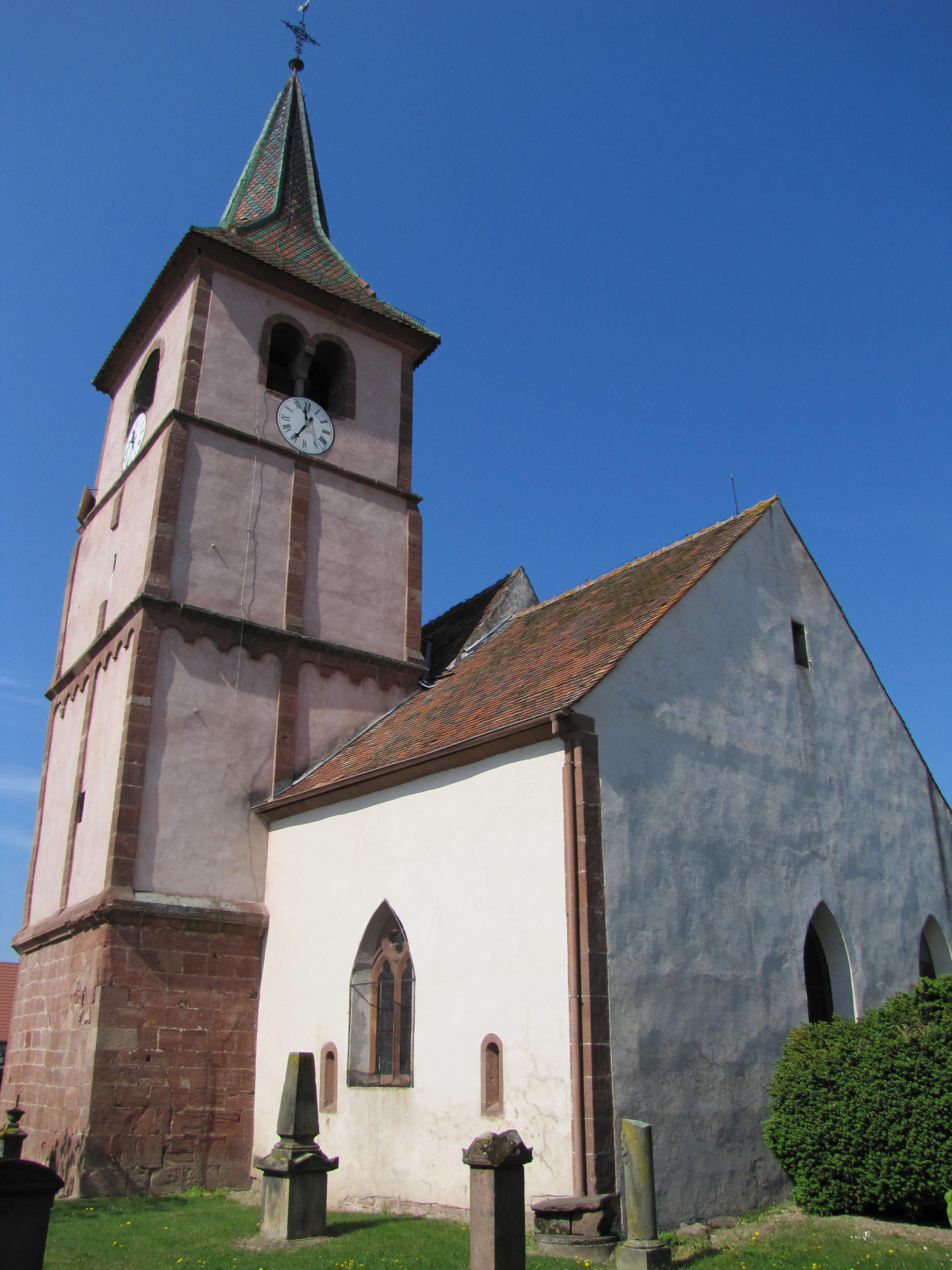
The Church

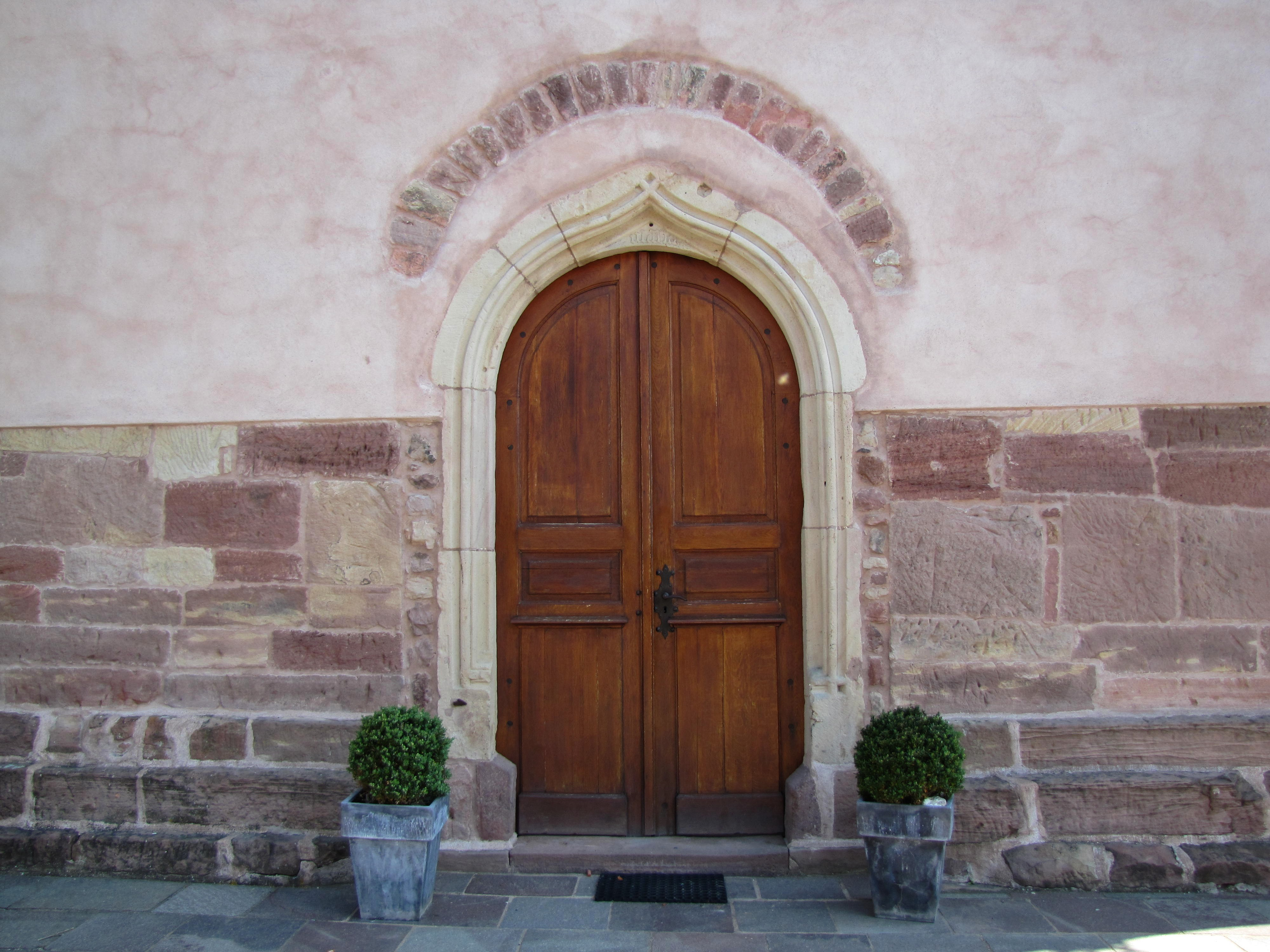
The Entrance

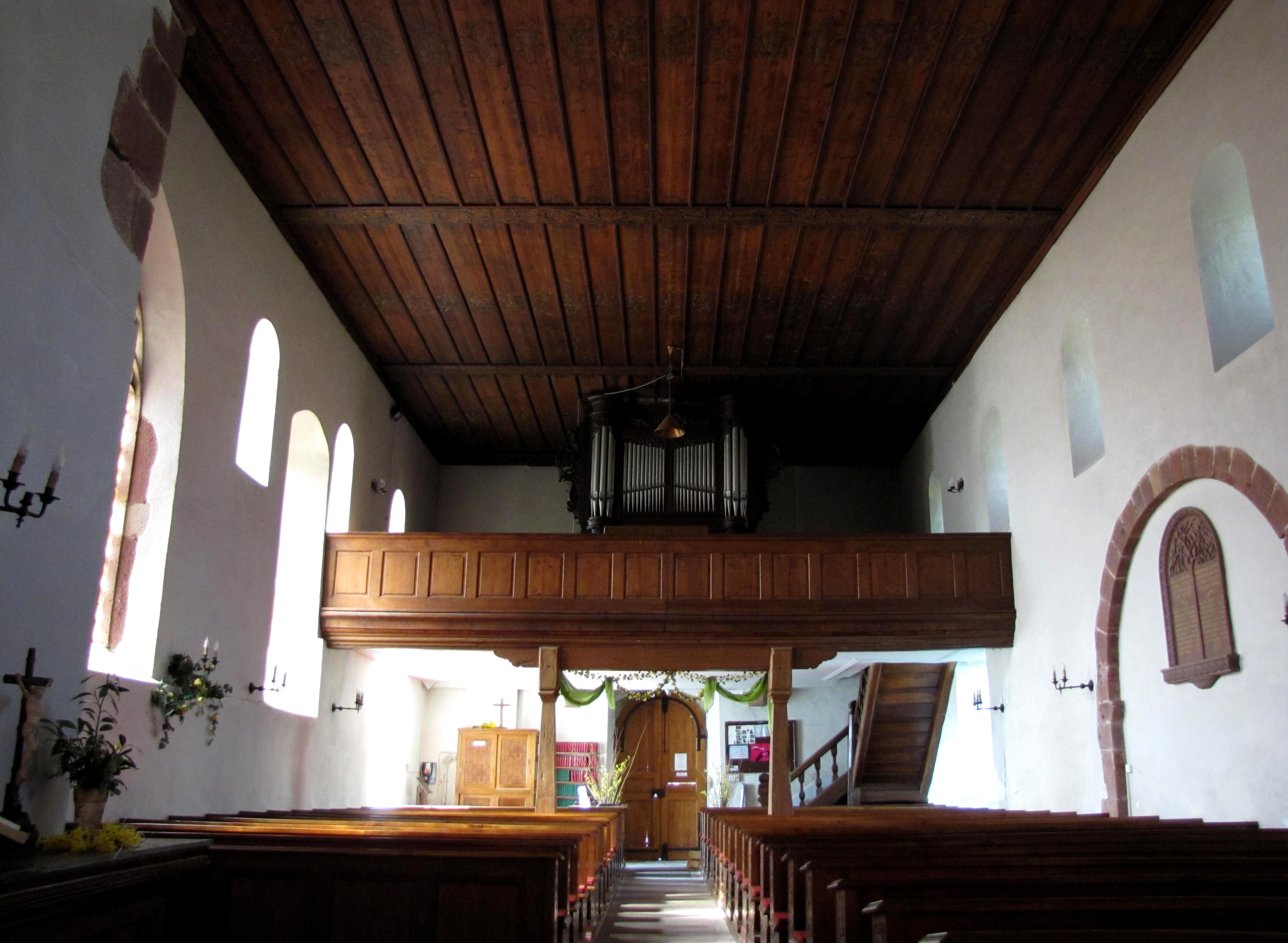
The Nave

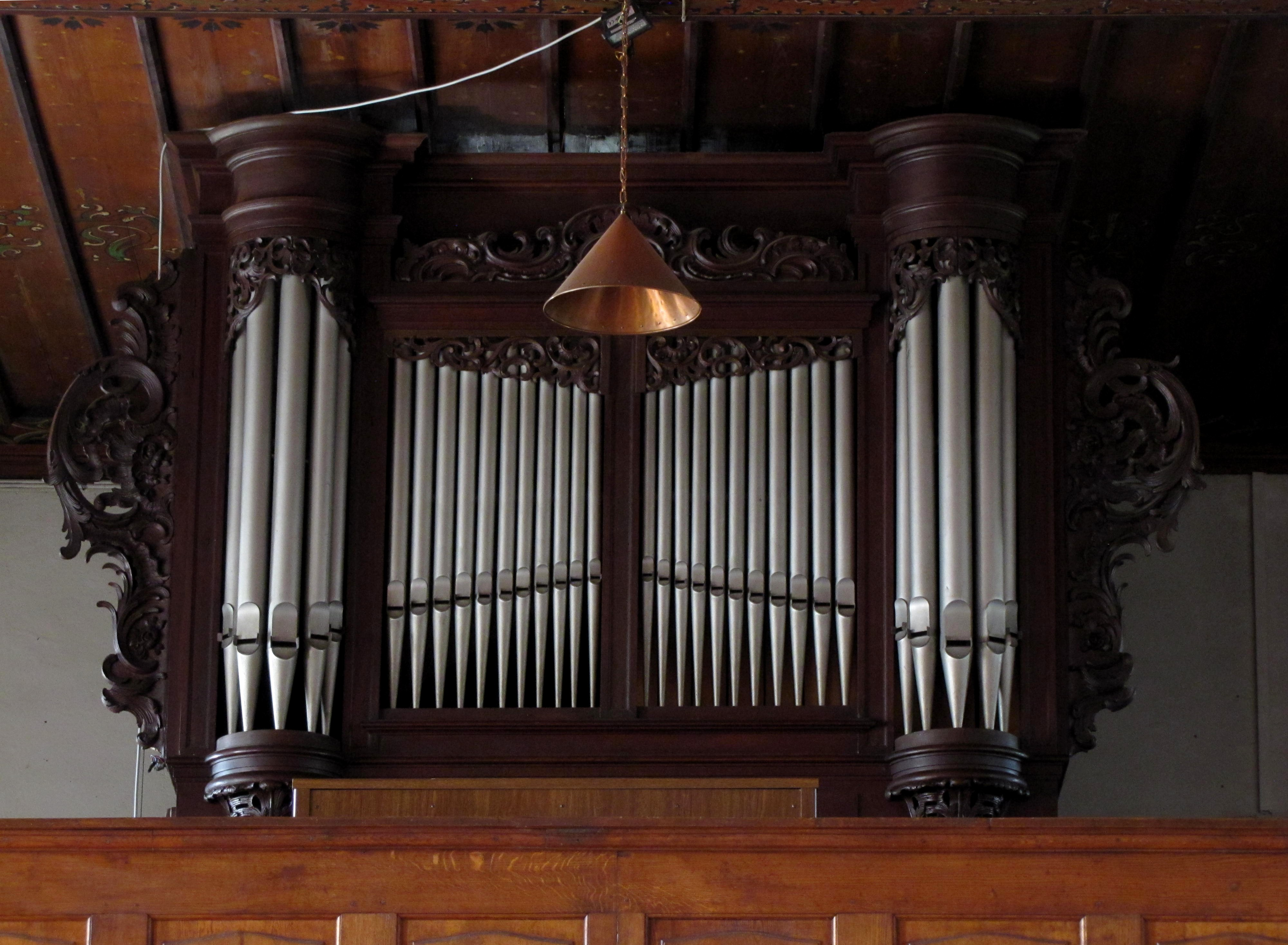
The Organ

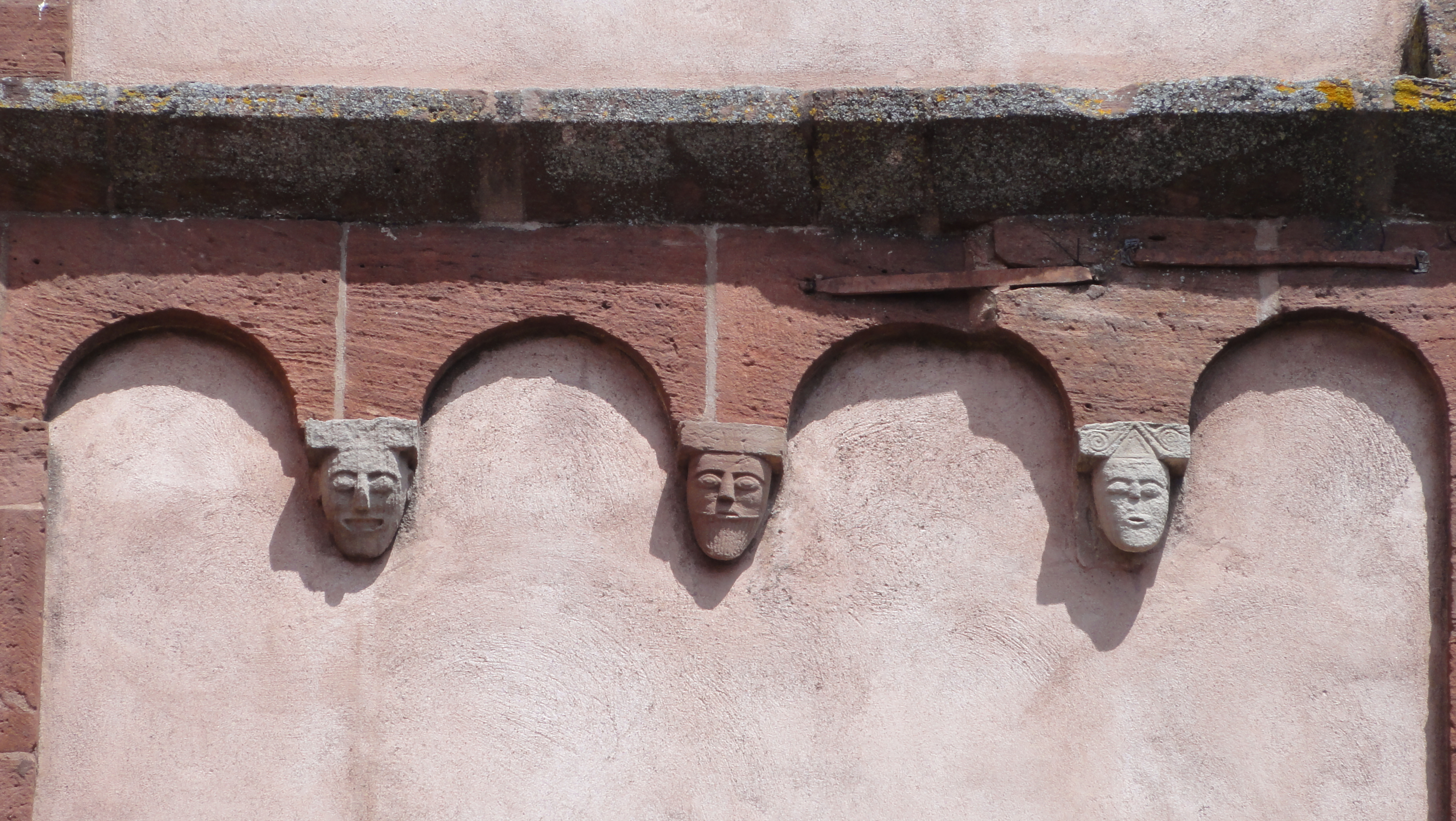
The Culots

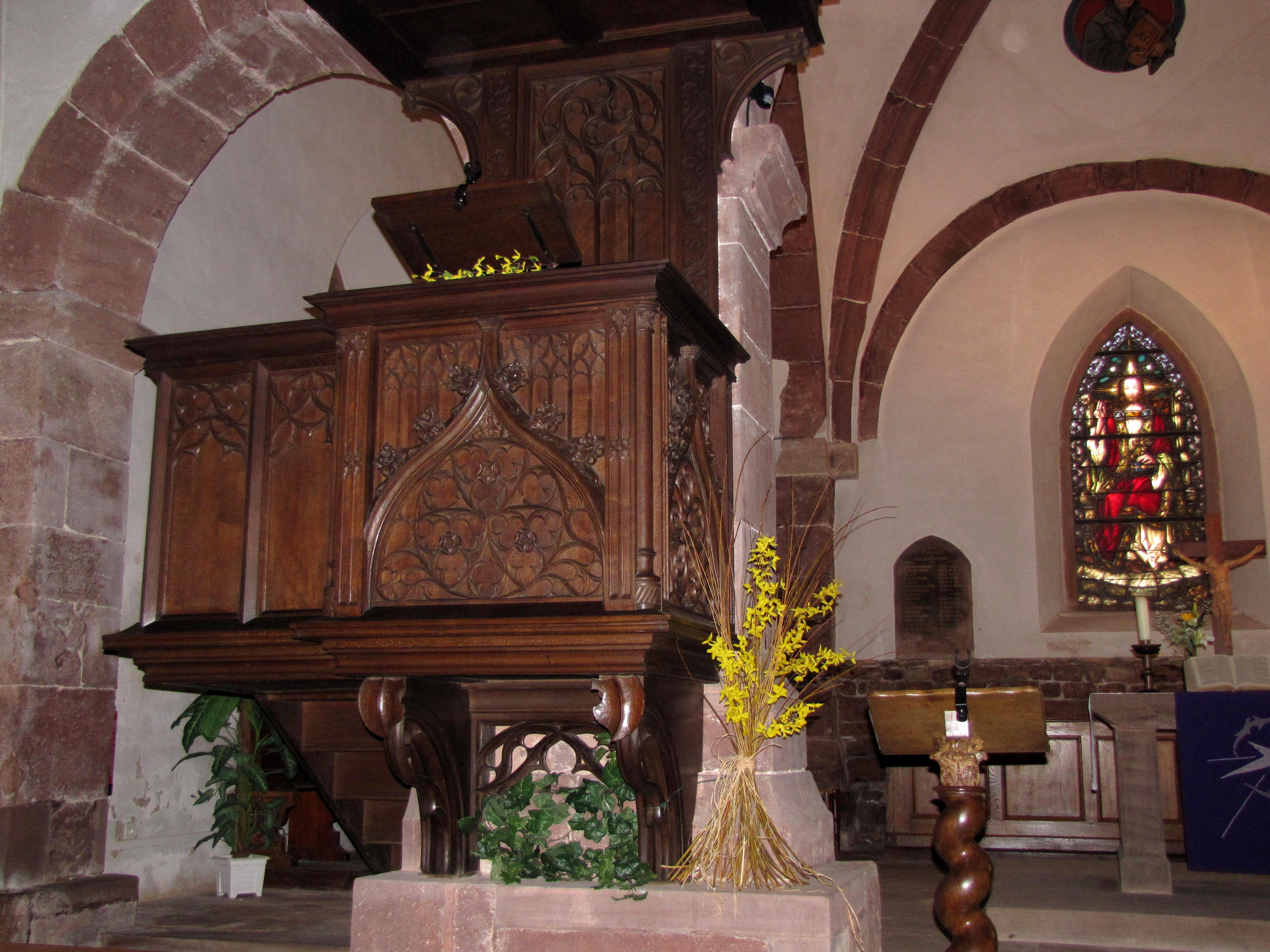
The Pastoral Chair

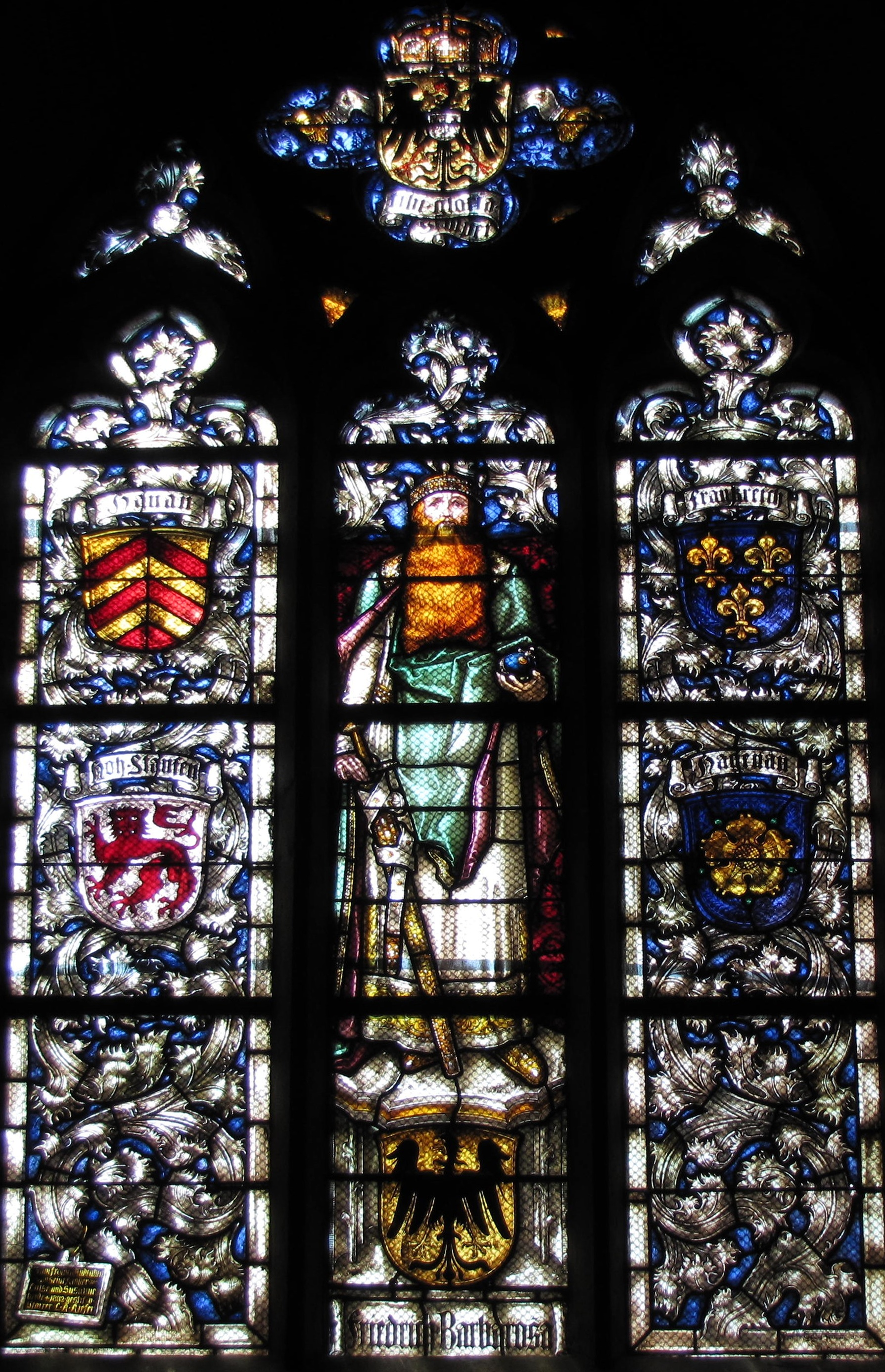
A Stained glass window

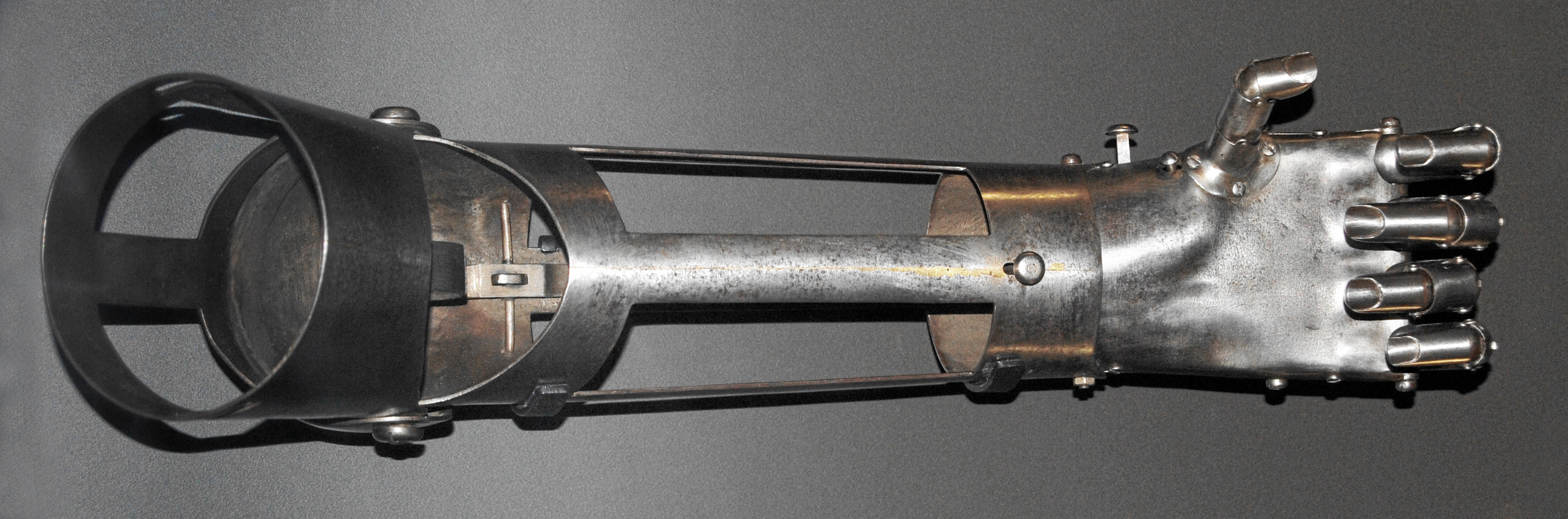
The reconstructed prosthetic arm of Hans von Mittelhausen

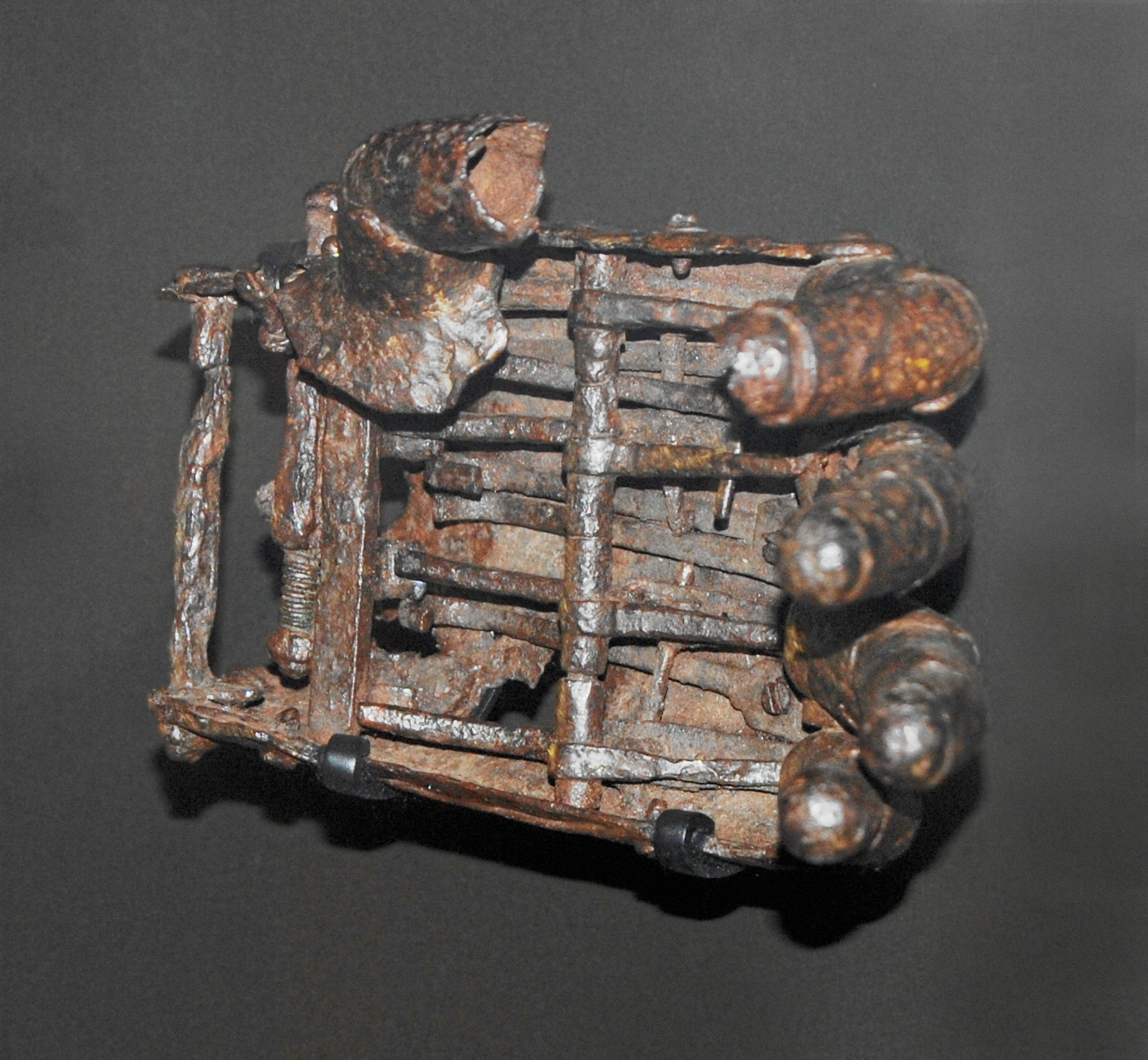
The original hand in the Strasbourg Museum
