= Iron harvest =

Annual removal of debris from WWI warfare in Belgian and French farmland

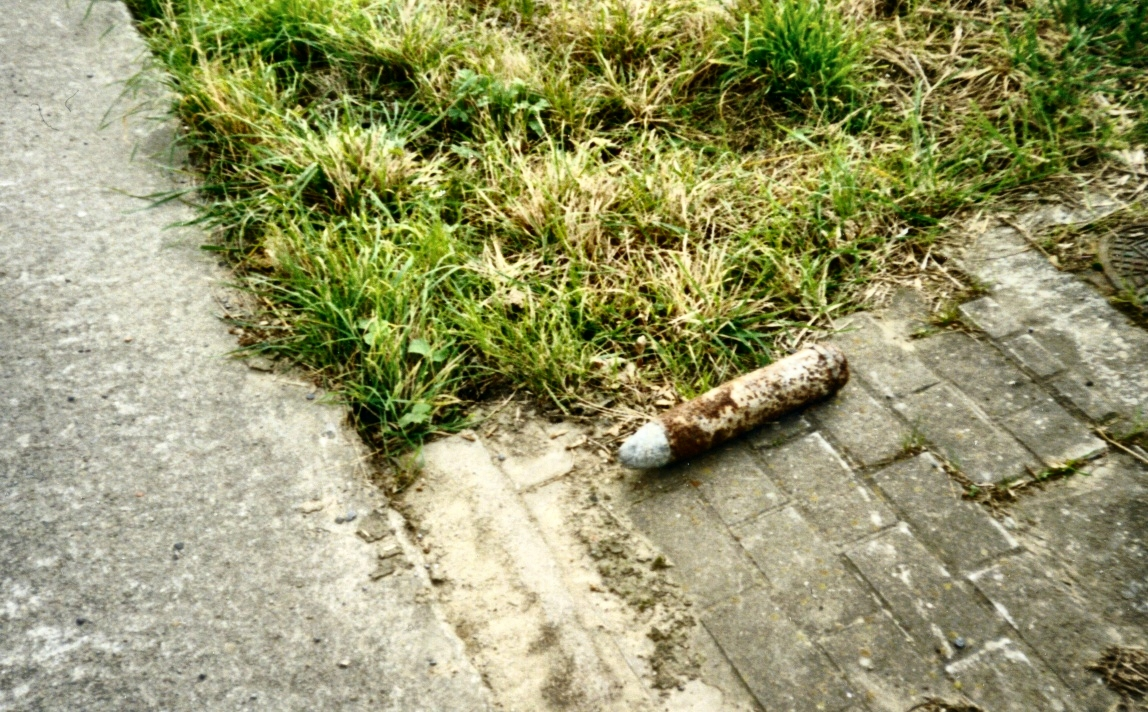
Small German artillery shell from World War I left beside a field for disposal near Ypres, Belgium

The iron harvest (French: récolte de fer or moisson de fer) is the annual collection of unexploded ordnance, barbed wire, shrapnel, bullets and other remnant war materiel collected by Belgian and French farmers after ploughing their fields. The harvest generally consists of material from the former western fronts of the First and Second World Wars, where it is still found in large quantities.

== Unexploded munitions ==
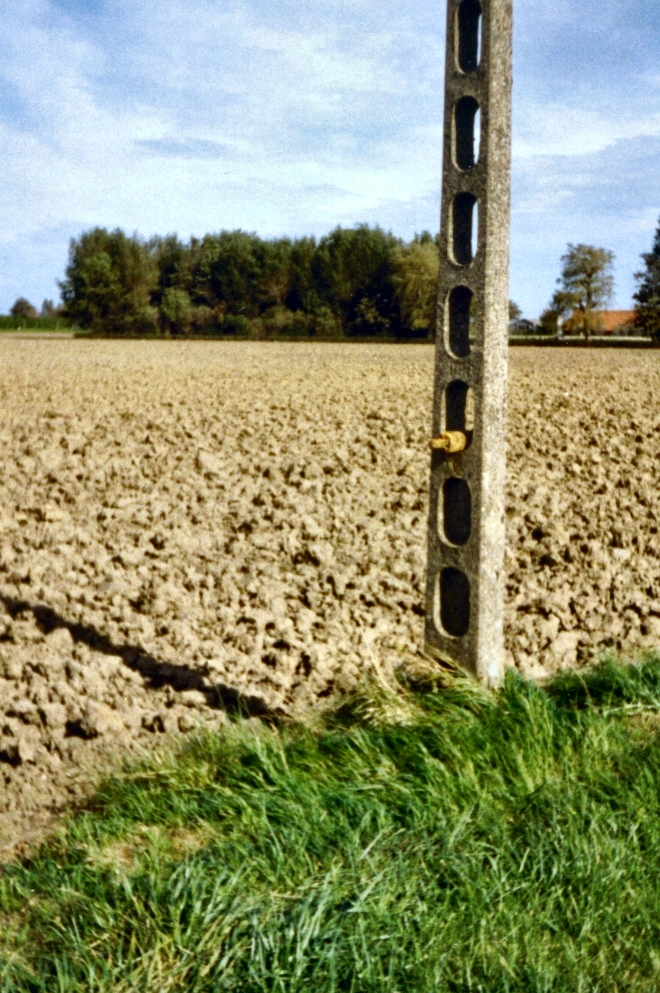
Stokes trench mortar bomb from World War I left in a telegraph pole for disposal in 2004 near Ypres in Belgium

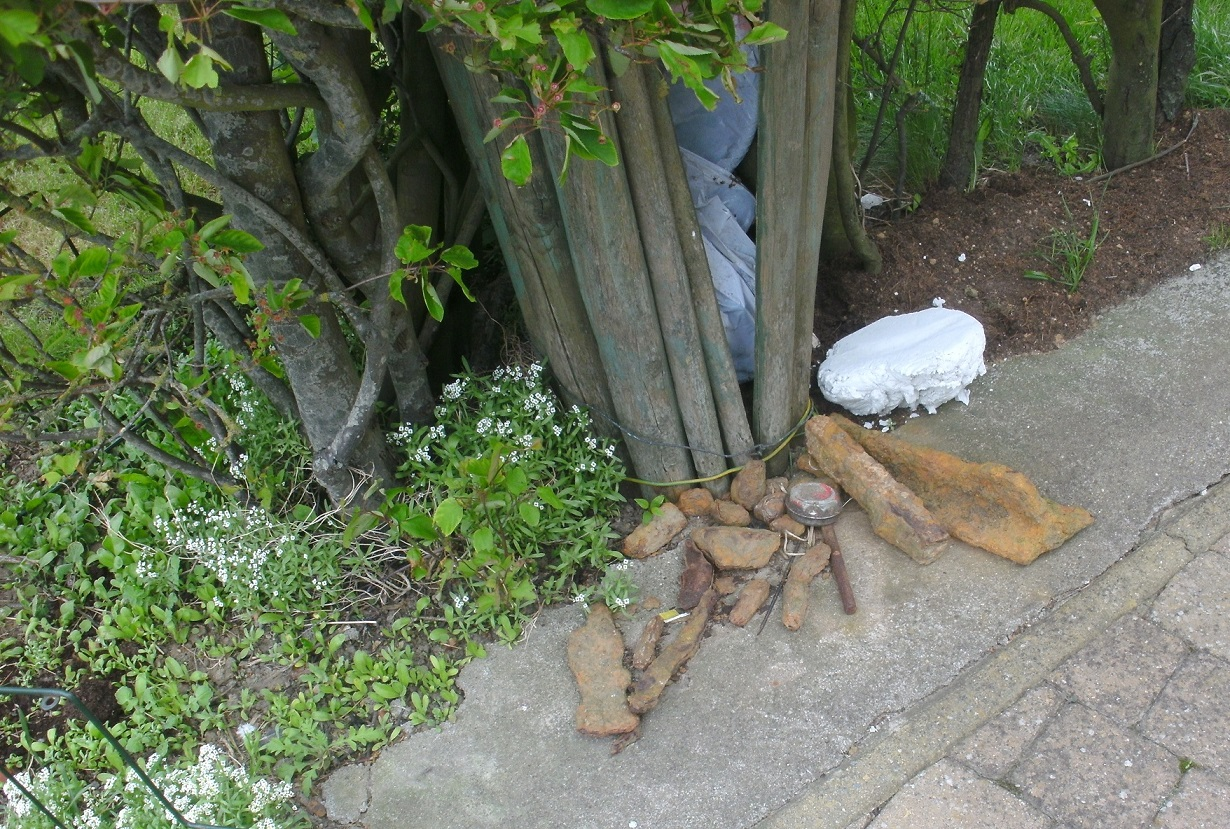
Shell pieces and other battlefield artifacts deposited next to a farmer's bin at Passendale

During World War I, an estimated 1.5 billion shells were fired on the Western front. In the area around the Battle of Verdun, one tonne of explosives was fired for every square metre of territory. As many as one in every four shells fired did not detonate. In the Ypres Salient, an estimated 300 million projectiles that the British and the German forces fired at each other during World War I were duds, and most of them have not been recovered. According to its website, DOVO, the demining unit of the Belgian armed forces, defused more than 200 tons of ammunition in 2019.

Unexploded weapons—in the form of shells, bullets, and grenades—buried themselves on impact or were otherwise quickly swallowed in the mud. As time passes, construction work, field ploughing, and natural processes bring the rusting shells to the surface. Most of the iron harvest is found during the spring planting and autumn ploughing, as the regions of northern France and Flanders are rich agricultural areas. Farmers collect the munitions and place them along the boundaries of fields or other collection points for authorities.

== Dangers ==
Despite their age, unexploded munitions remain very dangerous. The French Département du Déminage, 'Department of Mine Clearance' recovers about 900 tons of unexploded munitions every year. Since 1946, approximately 630 French ordnance disposal workers have been killed handling unexploded munitions. Two died handling munitions outside Vimy, France, as recently as 1998, and in 2014 two Belgian construction workers were killed when they encountered an unexploded shell buried for a century. Over 20 members of the Belgian Explosive Ordnance Disposal (DOVO) have died disposing of First World War munitions since the unit was formed in 1919. In just the area around Ypres, 260 people have been killed and 535 have been injured by unexploded munitions since the end of the First World War. Shells containing poisonous gas remain viable and will corrode and release their gas contents. Close to five percent of the shells fired during the First World War contained poisonous gas, and ordnance disposal experts continue to suffer burns from mustard gas shells that were split open.

== Disposal ==
In Belgium, munitions and wartime iron harvested by farmers are carefully placed around field edges or in gaps in telegraph poles, where they are regularly collected by the Belgian army for disposal by controlled explosion at a specialist centre in Poelkapelle. The depot was built after the dumping of shells in the sea stopped in 1980. Once extracted by the army, any gas chemicals are burned and destroyed at high temperatures at specialised facilities and the explosives detonated.

== See also ==
- Zone rouge
- Sécurité Civile § Bomb disposal
- Iron (metaphor)
