= Iron Fist =

Iron Fist, Iron fist or Ironfist may refer to an Iron hand prosthesis that could be set to fist position to hold cutlery, a tool or a sword; to ruthless and usually unrestricted control, as commonly exercised in authoritarian or totalitarian regimes, or to:

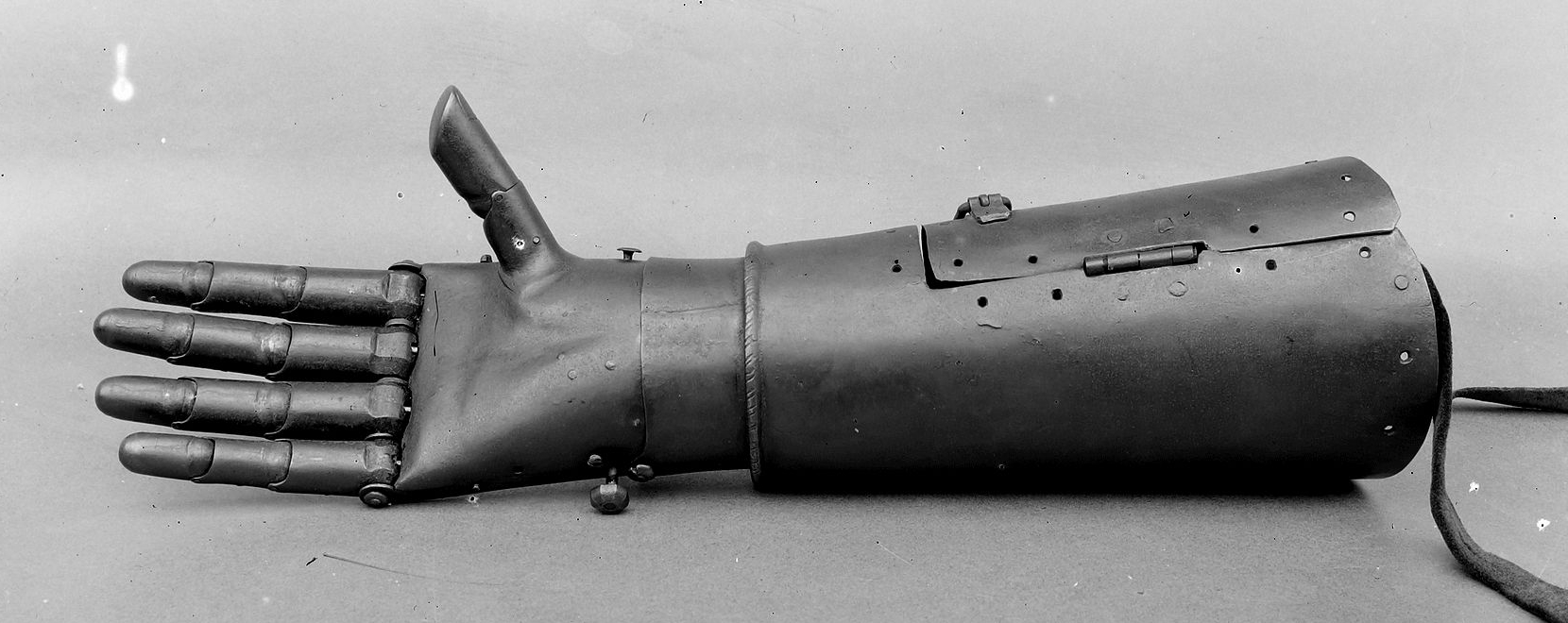
Second iron hand of Götz von Berlichingen, c. 1530

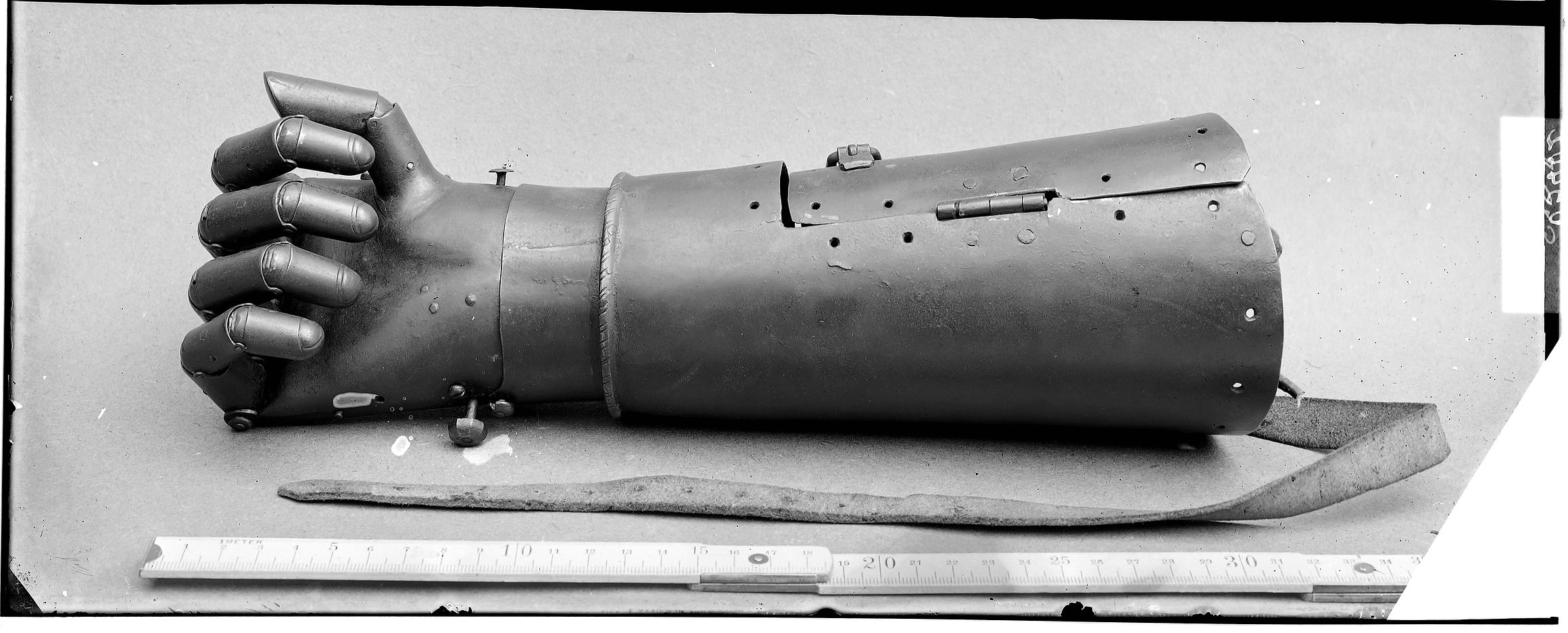
Iron hand as iron fist

== Military ==
- Iron Fist (exercise), an Indian Air Force exercise held in 2013 and 2016
- Iron Fist (countermeasure), an Israeli counter-weapon system
- 20th Armoured Brigade (United Kingdom) or The Iron Fist, a British Army armoured formation based in Paderborn, Germany
- Operation Iron Fist (disambiguation)

== Music ==
- Iron Fist (album), a 1982 album by Motörhead
  - "Iron Fist" (song)
- Iron Fist, a progenitor of the band Helloween
- "Iron Fist", a song by Die Apokalyptischen Reiter from Soft & Stronger
- "Iron Fist", a song by Goldfinger from Disconnection Notice
- "Iron Fist", a 2013 song by Coheed and Cambria from The Afterman: Descension

== Other uses ==
- Iron Fist (character), a Marvel Comics superhero
  - Iron Fist (TV series), a Netflix series based on the Marvel Comics series
- Iron Fist (novel), a 1998 Star Wars novel by Aaron Allston
  - Iron Fist, a fictional Super Star Destroyer
- Tekken or Iron Fist, a series of fighting games by Namco
- Dr. Ironfist or Vitali Klitschko, Ukrainian heavyweight boxer
- Puerto Rican anti-crime policy or The iron fist
- Brass knuckles, a weapon that inflicts more damage while punching

== See also ==
- Iron Hand (disambiguation)
- Iron Hands (disambiguation)
- The Man with the Iron Fists, a film starring RZA and Russell Crowe
- Pan Qingfu
- The Way of the Fist: Iron Fist Edition, a box set album by Five Finger Death Punch
