= Iron Hands =

Iron Hands may refer to:

- Iron Hands (Pokémon), a Pokémon species
- Iron Hands (Warhammer 40,000), fictional characters in the game Warhammer 40,000
- Iron Hands, a 2004 novel by Jonathan Green for Warhammer 40,000

== See also ==
- Iron Hand (disambiguation)
  - Iron hand (prosthesis), a kind of prosthetic limb popular in Europe in the 15th–19th centuries
- Iron Fist (disambiguation)
