= Iron Butterfly (disambiguation) =

Iron Butterfly was an American psychedelic rock band.

Iron Butterfly may also refer to:

== People ==
- Katharine Graham (1917-2001), a newspaper publisher
- Imelda Marcos (born 1929), a Filipino politician
- Jeanette MacDonald (1903-1965), an actress

== Other uses ==
- Iron butterfly (options strategy), an investment strategy
- Iron Butterfly, a character in the Heroes comic
- The Iron Butterfly, a 1989 action film directed by Johnnie To
- A rock climbing route on Windtower, a mountain in Alberta, Canada
