= Operation Iron Fist =

Operation Iron Fist may refer to:

- Operation Iron Fist, a 1937 Chinese offensive operation during the Battle of Shanghai
- Iron Fist policy, or Operation Iron Fist (1985), an Israeli military operation during the South Lebanon conflict (1985–2000)
- Operation Iron Fist (2002), an operation in Sudan
- Operation Iron Fist II (2004), one of a list of coalition military operations of the Iraq War
- Operation Iron Fist (2005), an operation in the Iraq War
- Operation Iron Fist, a code name for the Second Nagorno-Karabakh War (2020)

== See also ==
- Iron Fist (disambiguation)
