= Iron Bird =

Iron Bird or iron bird may refer to:

- Iron Bird, the title of an episode of the List of Monster Rancher episodes
- Eisenvogel, literally Iron Bird, the title of the Swiss-Tibetan book by Yangzom Brauen
- Iron bird (aviation), a test rig used to prototype aircraft systems under development
