= Iron Mike (disambiguation) =

Iron Mike is a name used for memorial statues of American servicemen.

Iron Mike may also refer to:

== People ==
- Michael D. Healy (1926–2018), U.S. Army general and Special Forces legend
- Michael DiBiase (1923–1969), professional wrestler
- Mike Ditka (1939-2026), National Football League player and coach
- Mike Donahue (1876–1960), college football coach
- Mike Gapes (born 1952), former member of the United Kingdom's Labour Party
- Mike Keenan (born 1949), National Hockey League head coach and general manager
- Michael Malloy (1873–1933), Irish murder victim
- Mike Marshall (pitcher) (born 1943), Major League Baseball pitcher
- Ernest L. Massad (1908–1993), US Army general
- John H. Michaelis (1912–1985), US Army general
- Mick Murphy (cyclist) (1934–2015), Irish cyclist
- Iron Mike Norton (born 1973), American blues musician
- John W. O'Daniel (1894–1975), U.S. Army general
- Mike Prendergast (baseball) (1888–1967), American Major League Baseball pitcher
- Michael Russell (tennis) (born 1978), American tennis player
- Mike Sharpe (1952–2016), professional wrestler
- Mike Tenay (born 1954), professional wrestling commentator
- Mike Tyson (born 1966), American boxer
- Mike Webster (1952–2002), National Football League player
- Mike Webster (Canadian football) (born 1944), Canadian Football League player and professional wrestler
- Mike Williamson (footballer) (born 1983), Newcastle United footballer
- Mike Zambidis (born 1980), Greek kickboxer

== Other uses ==
- Iron Mike (fountain), a cast iron fountain in Oregon, Illinois
- Iron Mike Productions, a boxing promotion company based in Deerfield Beach, Florida
- Nautical slang for an autopilot system
- Baseball slang for a pitching machine
- "Iron Mike", a poem by Charles Bukowski from the book Love is a Dog From Hell
