= Princess Iron Fan (disambiguation) =

Princess Iron Fan is a fictional character from the Chinese classic novel Journey to the West.

Princess Iron Fan may also refer to:

- Princess Iron Fan (1941 film), an animated film
- Princess Iron Fan (1966 film), a live action film
