= Iron Eagle (disambiguation) =

Iron Eagle may refer to:

- Iron Eagle, a 1986 motion picture
  - Iron Eagle II, 1988 sequel
  - Aces: Iron Eagle III, 1992 sequel
  - Iron Eagle on the Attack a.k.a. Iron Eagle IV, 1995 sequel
- Iron Eagle (soundtrack), the soundtrack of the 1986 movie
- The Reichsadler ("Imperial Eagle"), a symbol used in Germany

== See also ==
- Ian Eagle, American sports announcer
