= Iron Dragon =

Iron Dragon may refer to:

- Iron Dragon (roller coaster), a suspended roller coaster at Cedar Point in Sandusky, Ohio
- Iron Dragon (board game), a Crayon rails board game made by Mayfair Games
