= Bergbieten =

Bergbieten Baribiete
- Commune
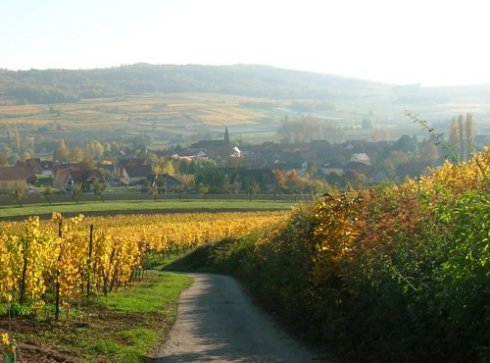
- A general view of Bergbieten

- Coat of arms
- Location of Bergbieten
- Location within France Location within Grand Est
- Coordinates: 48°34′38″N 7°27′32″E
- Country: France
- Region: Grand Est
- Department: Bas-Rhin
- Arrondissement: Molsheim
- Canton: Molsheim

Government
  - Mayor (2020–2026): Albert Goetz
- Area^{1}: 4.24 km^{2} (1.64 sq mi)
- Highest elevation: 272 m (892 ft)
- Lowest elevation: 178 m (584 ft)
- Population (2023): 718
  - Density: 169/km^{2} (439/sq mi)
- Time zone: UTC+01:00 (CET)
  - Summer (DST): UTC+02:00 (CEST)
- INSEE/Postal code: 67030 /67310
- ^{1} French Land Register data, which excludes lakes, ponds, glaciers > 1 km^{2} (0.386 sq mi or 247 acres) and river estuaries.

Bergbieten (French pronunciation: [bɛʁɡbitən]) is a commune in the Bas-Rhin department in Grand Est in northeastern France.

== Population ==
Historical population
Year	Pop.	±% p.a.
1968	394	—
1975	366	−1.05%
1982	398	+1.20%
1990	459	+1.80%
1999	517	+1.33%
2007	612	+2.13%
2012	680	+2.13%
2017	704	+0.70%
2023	718	+0.33%
Source: INSEE

== See also ==
- Communes of the Bas-Rhin department
