= Iron City =

Iron City is the name of three places in the United States:

- Iron City, Georgia
- Iron City, Tennessee
- Iron City, Utah, a ghost town

It is a minor nickname for Pittsburgh, Pennsylvania and the main nickname of Itabira, Minas Gerais, Brazil

== Other ==
- Iron City (novel), a book by Lloyd Brown
- Iron City (album), an album by jazz guitarist Grant Green
- Iron City (Shameless), an episode of the American TV series Shameless
- Iron City Beer, a local beer in Pittsburgh, Pennsylvania, made by the Iron City Brewing Company
