= Iron Hand =

Iron Hand may refer to:

- Iron hand (prosthesis), a kind of prosthetic limb popular in Europe in the 15th-19th centuries
  - Goetz von Berlichingen Iron Hand (c. 1480–1562), German Imperial Knight and mercenary
- "Iron Hand" (song), 1991 Dire Straits song
- Iron Hand Society, a Syrian nationalist group organized in 1921
- Iron palm or iron hand, a body of training techniques in various Chinese martial arts
- Operation Iron Hand, a US military operation conducted during the Vietnam War
- "Iron Hand", a song by Battle Beast from their album Steel
- "Iron Hand", a song by Grand Magus from their album The Hunt
- The Iron Hand, the U.K. edition of The Iron Clew, a 1947 novel by Phoebe Atwood Taylor
- A 1970s comic strip drawn by Irish artist Paddy Brennan
- The original name of the 1960s U.S. Air Force mission Wild Weasel
- An alternative name for the Claw of Archimedes

== See also ==
- Iron Hands (disambiguation)
- Iron Fist (disambiguation)
- The Iron Hand of Mars, a 1992 historical mystery crime novel by Lindsey Davis
