= Iron Monkey =

Iron Monkey may refer to:

- Iron Monkey (1977 film), a Hong Kong–Taiwanese martial arts film
- Iron Monkey (1993 film), a Hong Kong martial arts film about folk hero Wong Fei-hung
- Iron Monkey (band), an English sludge metal band
