= Westhoffen =

- Commune
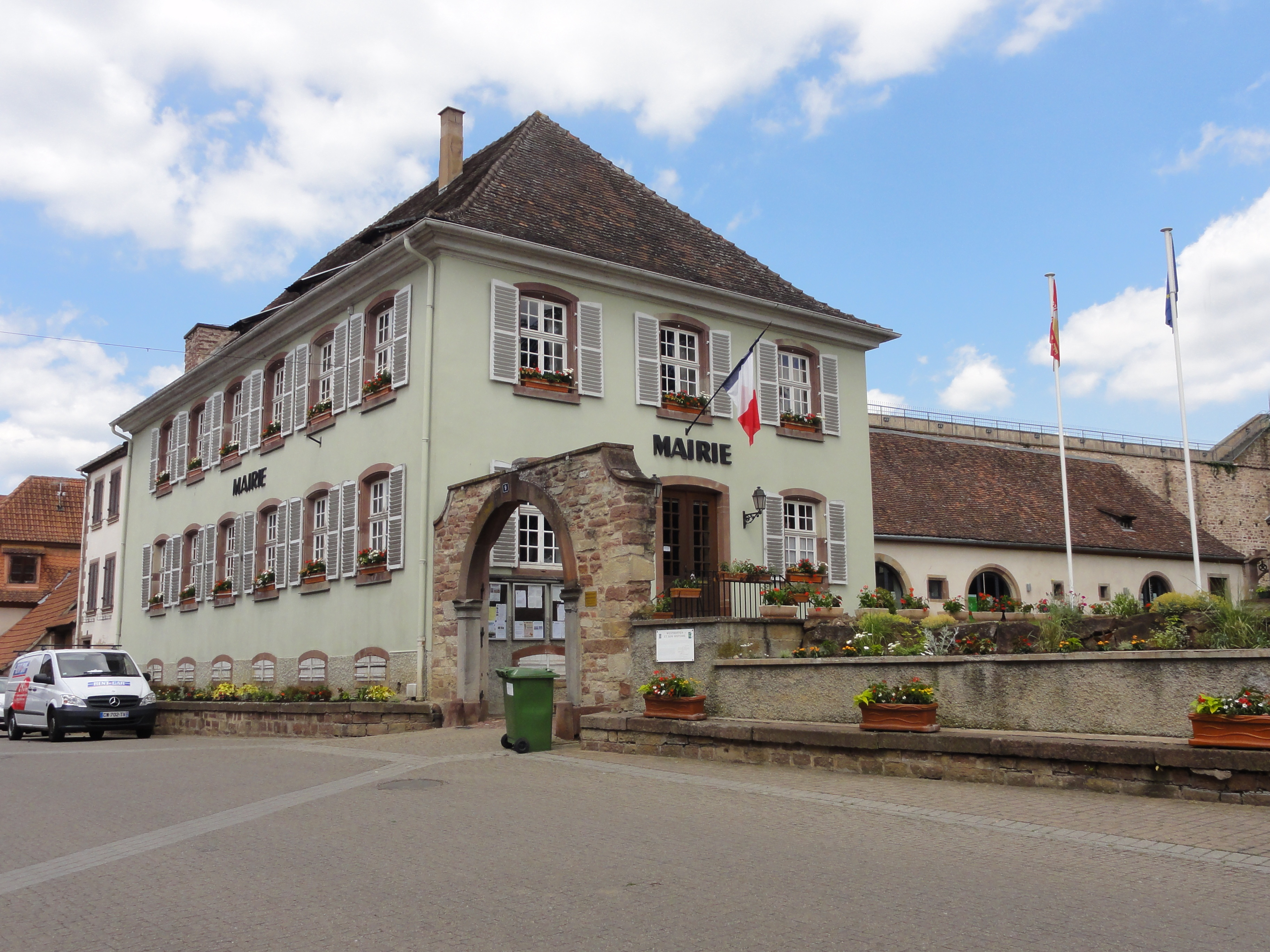
- The town hall in Westhoffen

- Coat of arms
- Location of Westhoffen
- Location within France Location within Grand Est
- Coordinates: 48°36′N 7°26′E
- Country: France
- Region: Grand Est
- Department: Bas-Rhin
- Arrondissement: Molsheim
- Canton: Saverne
- Intercommunality: Mossig et Vignoble

Government
  - Mayor (2020–2026): Pierre Geist
- Area^{1}: 20.65 km^{2} (7.97 sq mi)
- Highest elevation: 531 m (1,742 ft)
- Lowest elevation: 184 m (604 ft)
- Population (2023): 1,720
  - Density: 83.3/km^{2} (216/sq mi)
- Time zone: UTC+01:00 (CET)
  - Summer (DST): UTC+02:00 (CEST)
- INSEE/Postal code: 67525 /67310
- ^{1} French Land Register data, which excludes lakes, ponds, glaciers > 1 km^{2} (0.386 sq mi or 247 acres) and river estuaries.

Westhoffen (French pronunciation: [vɛstɔfən]; German: Westhofen im Elsass; Alsatian: Westhofe) is a commune in the Bas-Rhin department and Grand Est region of north-eastern France.

== History ==
From 1236 Westhofen was a fief of the Holy Roman Empire to the Lords of Lichtenberg, who with their successors Hanau-Lichtenberg will remain the lords of the places until the French Revolution. In the rule of Lichtenberg it was assigned to Amt Westhofen of the same name. In 1332 Westhofen received Town privileges, namely that of Haguenau.

The coat of arms of Westhoffen is thus directly inspired by the seal of the Lichtenbergs: a helm with a swan's neck crest. At this time (1250) the construction of the Saint-Martin church began, one of the rare hall churches of the Gothic period, which was profoundly altered and enlarged in the 19th century, thus giving it a neo-Gothic external appearance then in vogue.

When Jakobus ("James"), Count of Lichtenberg, the last male member of the family, died in 1480, the inheritance was divided between his two nieces, Anna and Elisabeth. Anna had married Philipp I, Count of Hanau-Lichtenberg (1417–1480), through whom Amt Westhofen came to the County of Hanau-Lichtenberg that resulted from this marriage.

== Education and building culture ==
Since 2026, Westhoffen has been the home of the Alsace School of Architecture & Crafts, run by the organization La Table Ronde de l’Architecture (T.R.A.). The organization, which also represents the Belgian chapter of the INTBAU network, established a permanent training center for traditional architecture and building crafts in the town.

The educational program is aimed at international students, architects, and craftspeople, offering theoretical subjects such as architectural freehand drawing and design theory, as well as practical courses in historic construction techniques (including timber framing, stonemasonry, half-timbered architecture, and lime and earth plastering). In addition to year-round operations, the campus in Westhoffen regularly hosts international summer schools and practical workshops dedicated to preserving regional Alsatian building culture.

== Population ==
Historical population
Year	Pop.	±% p.a.
1968	1,348	—
1975	1,386	+0.40%
1982	1,416	+0.31%
1990	1,460	+0.38%
1999	1,590	+0.95%
2007	1,610	+0.16%
2012	1,669	+0.72%
2017	1,651	−0.22%
2023	1,720	+0.68%
Source: INSEE

== Gallery ==
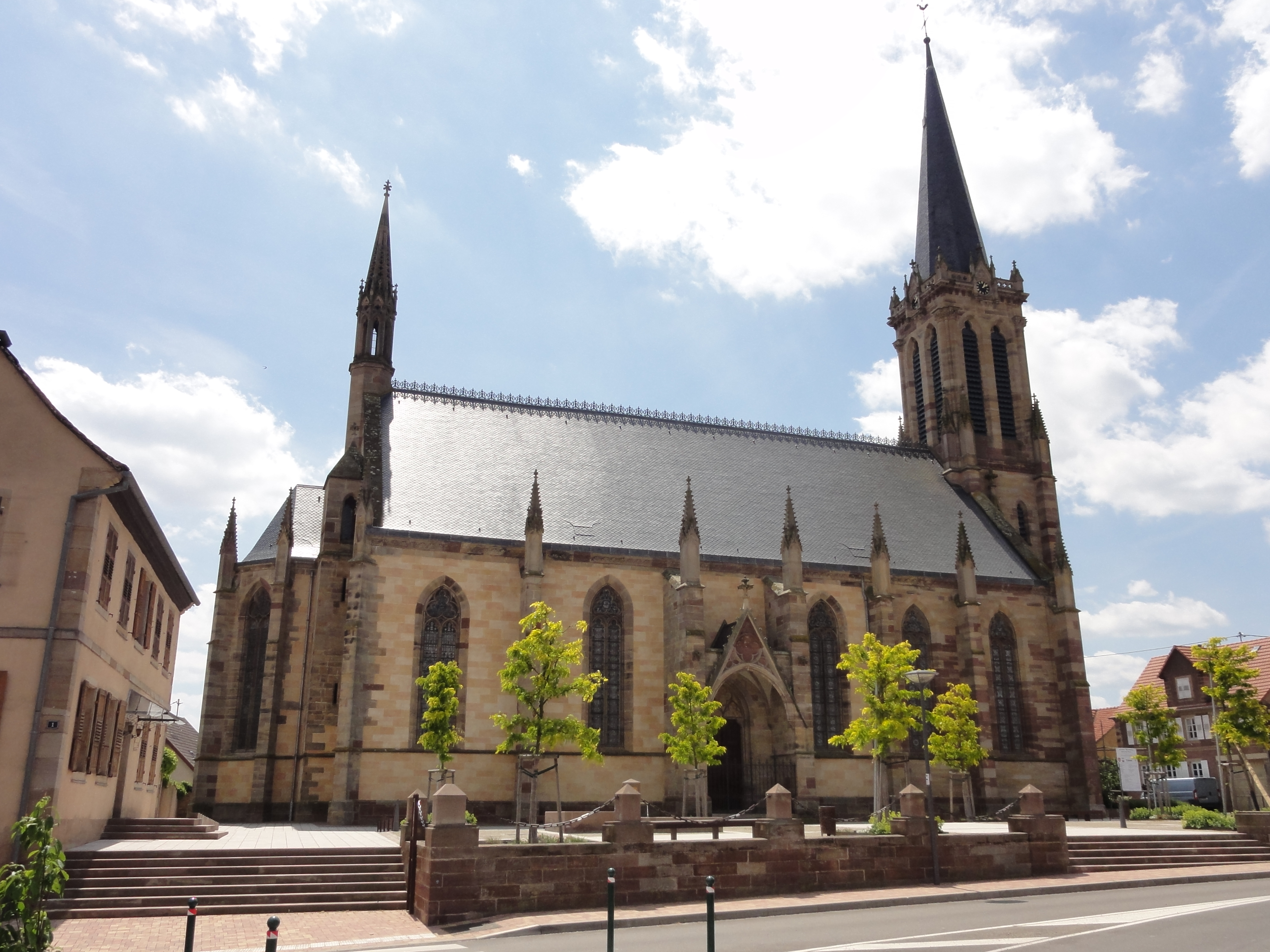
Protestant church
Saint-Martin.

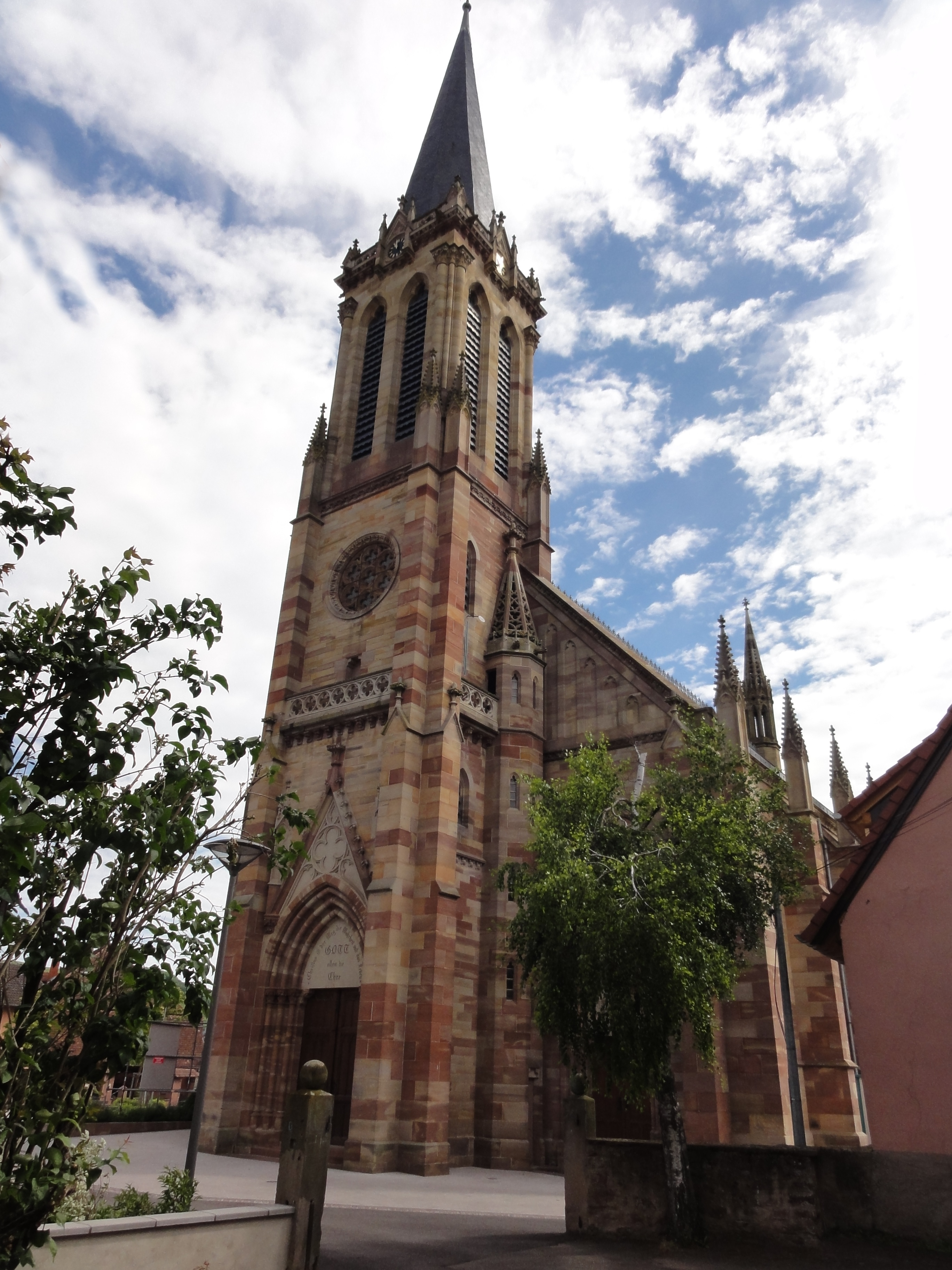
Protestant church
Saint-Martin.

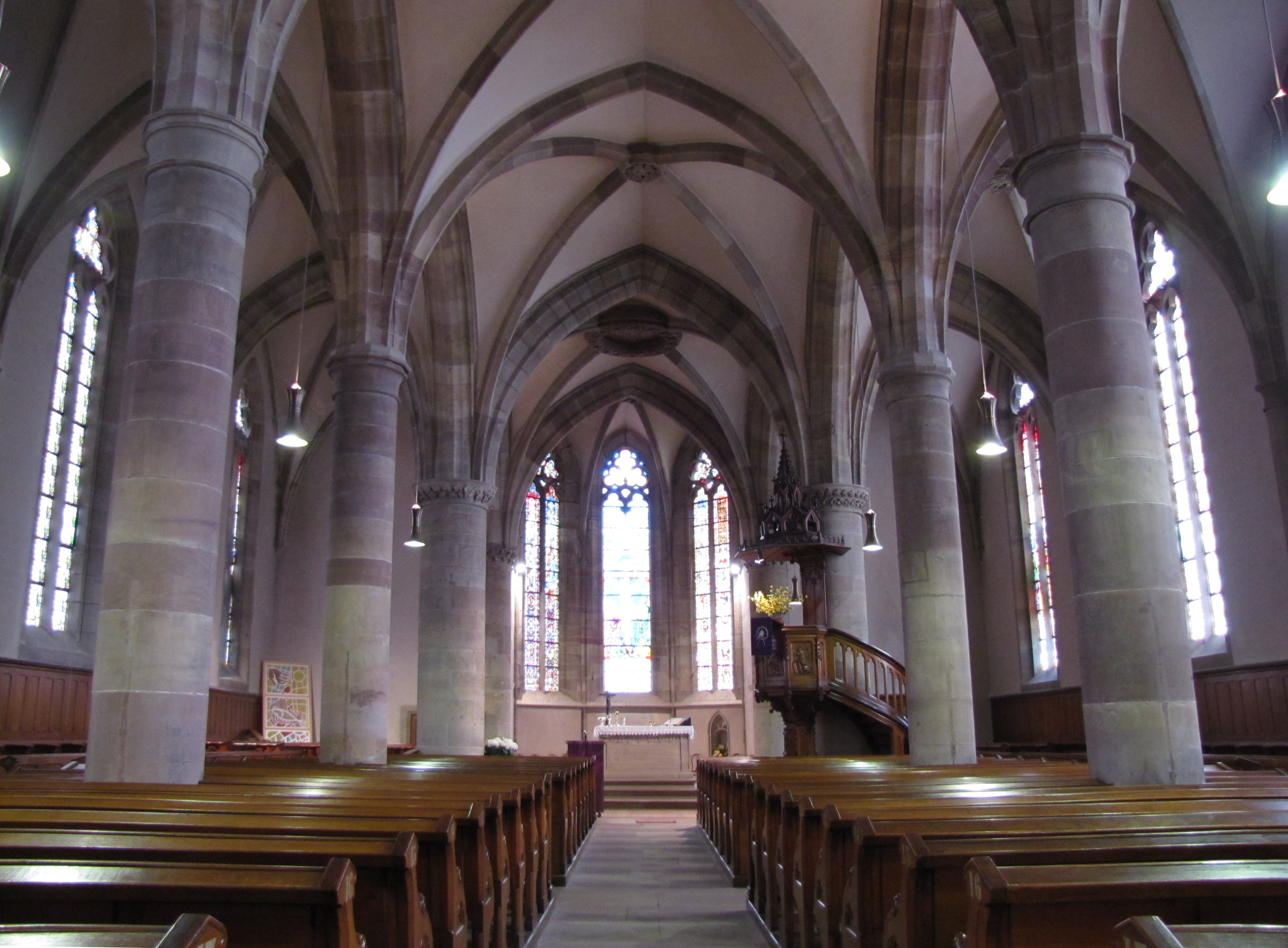
Interior view of the nave
towards the choir.

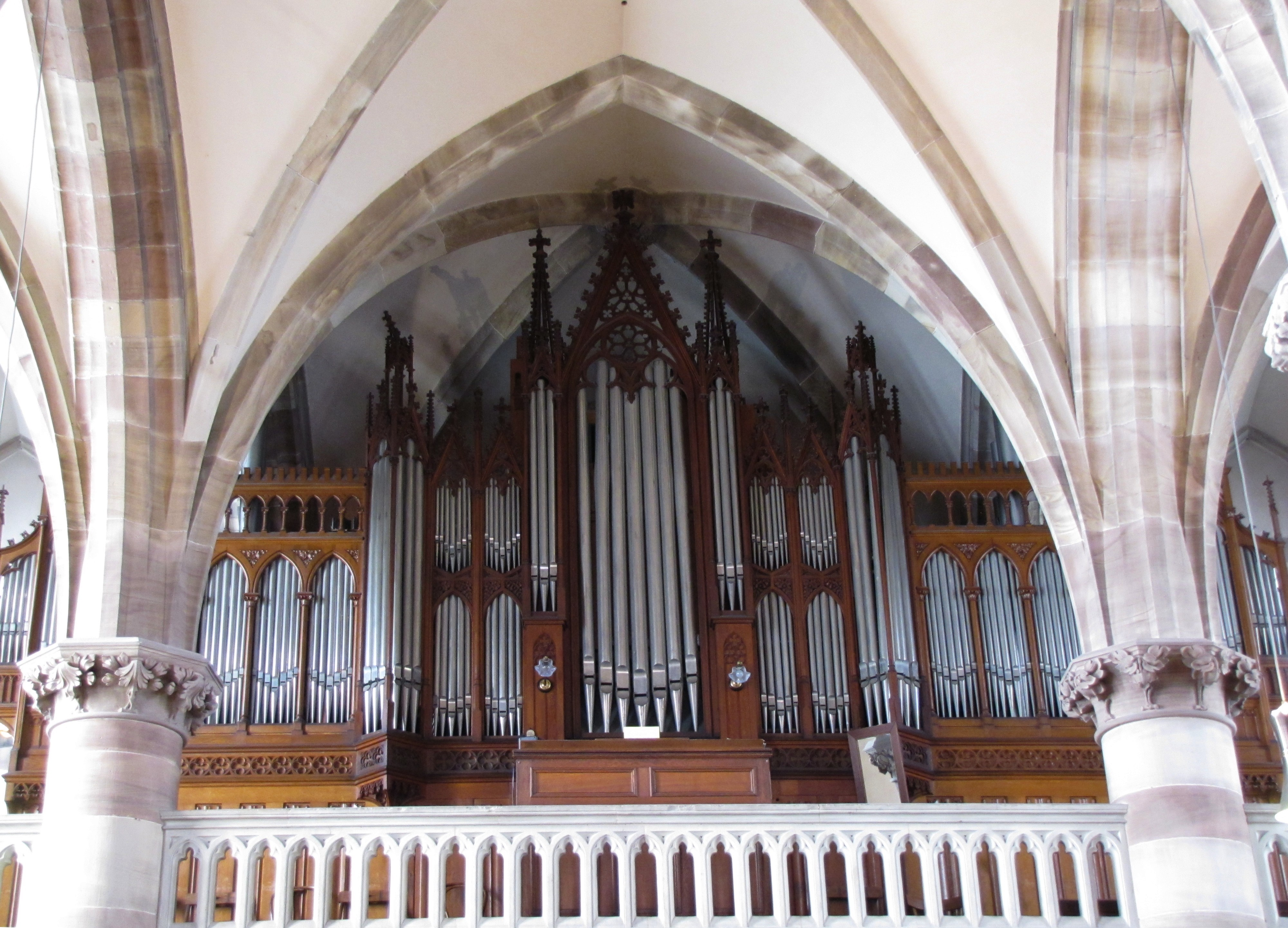
Dalstein-Haerpfer organ (1874-1912).

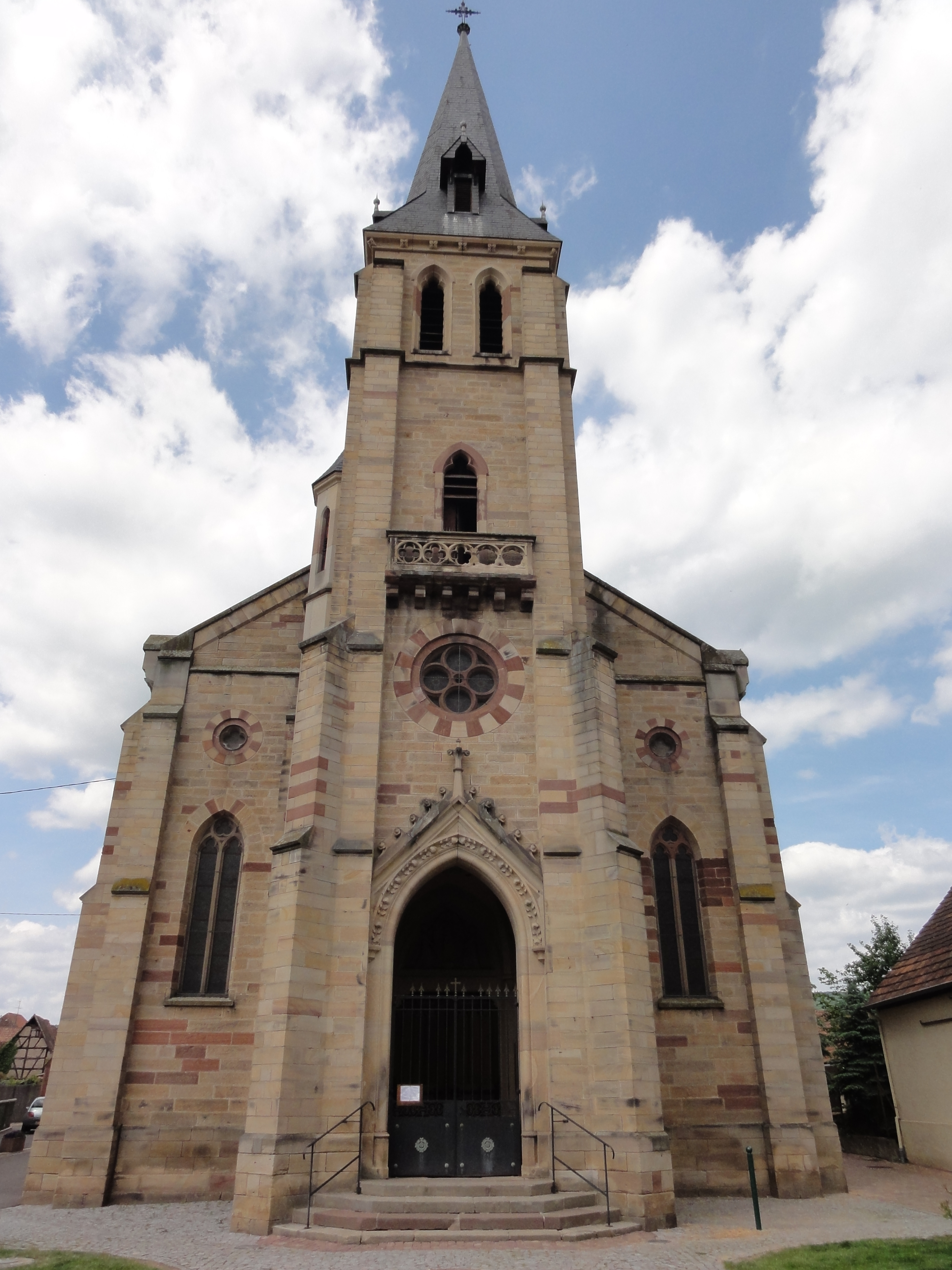
Catholic Church
Saint-Martin.

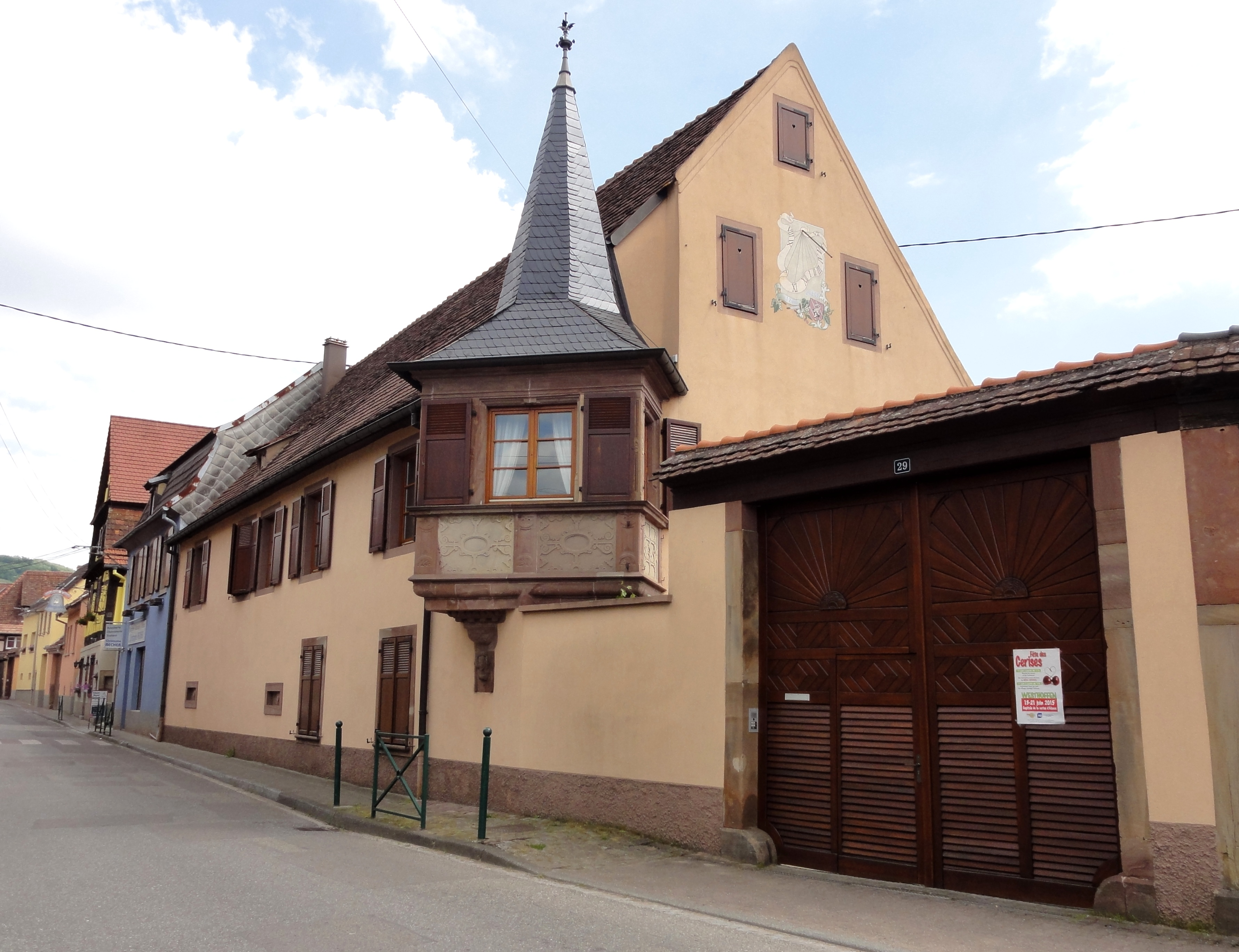
Tannery Bury

== See also ==
- Communes of the Bas-Rhin department
