= Iron Felix =

Iron Felix or Iron Feliks may refer to one of the following

- Felix Edmundovich Dzerzhinsky.
- Monument to Felix Dzerzhinsky, Moscow
- Pinwheel calculator Feliks.
