= Windtower (Alberta) =

Mountain in Alerta, Canada

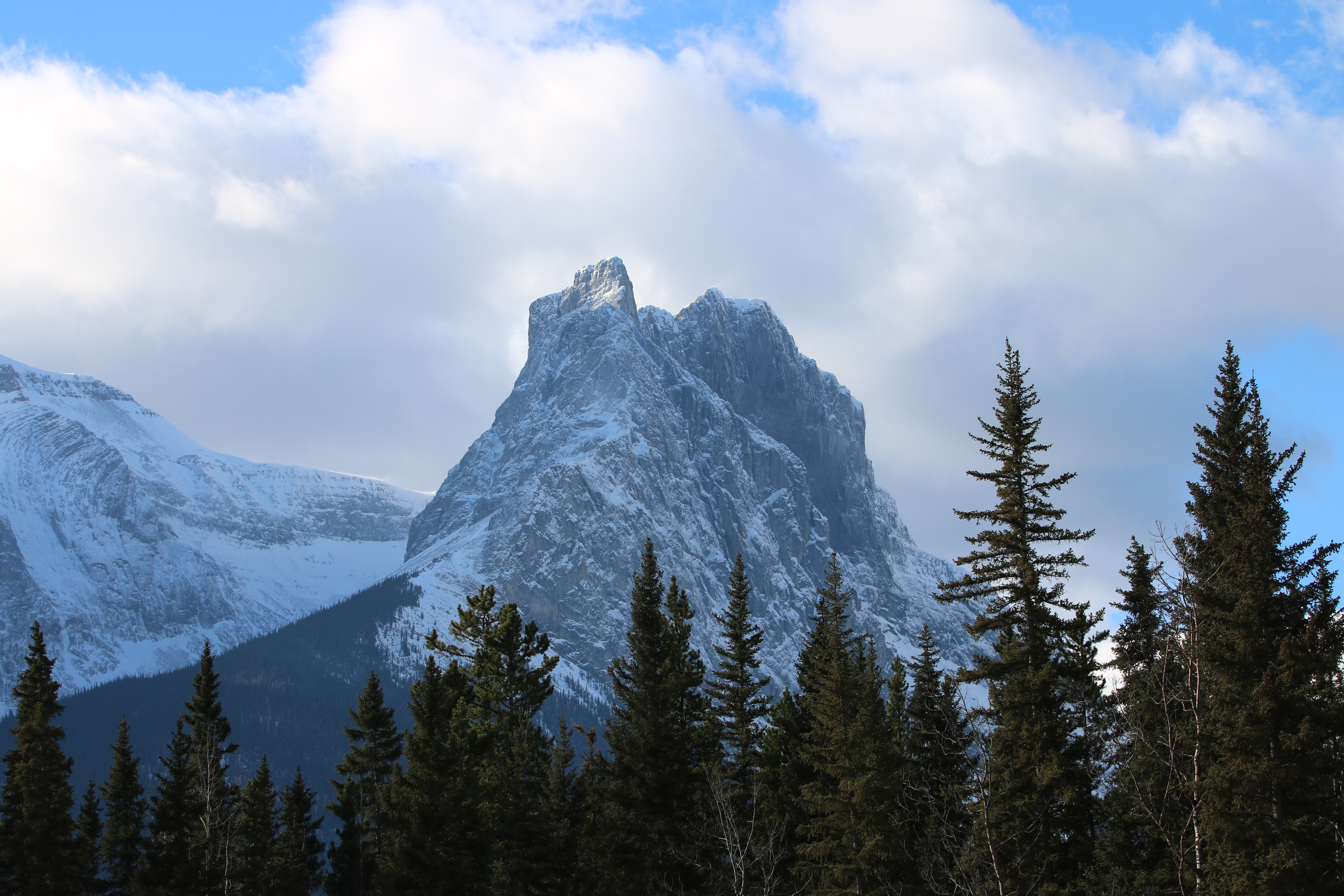
- Windtower

Highest point
- Elevation: 2,695 m (8,842 ft)
- Prominence: 175 m (574 ft)
- Parent peak: Mount Lougheed (3107 m)
- Listing: Mountains of Alberta
- Coordinates: 50°59′20″N 115°17′25″W

Geography
- Location within Alberta Location within Canada
- Interactive map of Windtower
- Location: Alberta, Canada
- Parent range: Canadian Rockies
- Topo map: NTS 82J14 Spray Lakes Reservoir

Geology
- Rock age: Cambrian
- Rock type: Palliser limestone

Climbing
- Easiest route: Scramble

Windtower is a 2,695-metre (8,842-foot) tower-like summit located in the Wind Valley of Kananaskis Country in the Canadian Rockies of Alberta, Canada. Its nearest higher peak is Mount Lougheed, 3.0 km (1.9 mi) to the southeast. Windtower is a conspicuous landmark that can be seen from Highway 1, the Trans-Canada Highway in the Canmore area. Although not of remarkable elevation, the mountain has an imposing, overhanging north face with an appearance similar to peaks in The Bugaboos.

== Climbing Routes ==
The Iron Butterfly is a formidable 450 metre 5.11 A4 rock climbing route on the northwest face. It was first climbed in 1988 by Jeff Marshall and Steve DeMaio, but attempts by others to repeat the feat have been unsuccessful.

The Northeast Ridge is a 5.5 route first climbed by B. Corbeau, G. Crocker and K. Hahn in July 1965.

The Northeast Face is a 570-metre 5.10a route first climbed by G. Homer and R. Wood in 1972.

The West Slope is a hike and easy scree scramble from Highway 742, the Smith-Dorrien/Spray Trail.

== History ==
Windtower was named in 1950. The mountain's name was officially adopted in 1982 by the Geographical Names Board of Canada.

== Geology ==
Windtower is composed of Palliser limestone, a sedimentary rock laid down during the Precambrian to Jurassic periods. Formed in shallow seas, this sedimentary rock was pushed east and over the top of younger rock during the Laramide orogeny.

== Climate ==
Based on the Köppen climate classification, Windtower is located in a subarctic climate zone with cold, snowy winters, and mild summers. Temperatures can drop below −20 °C with wind chill factors below −30 °C. Precipitation runoff from Windtower drains into the Bow River which is a tributary of the Saskatchewan River.

== Gallery ==
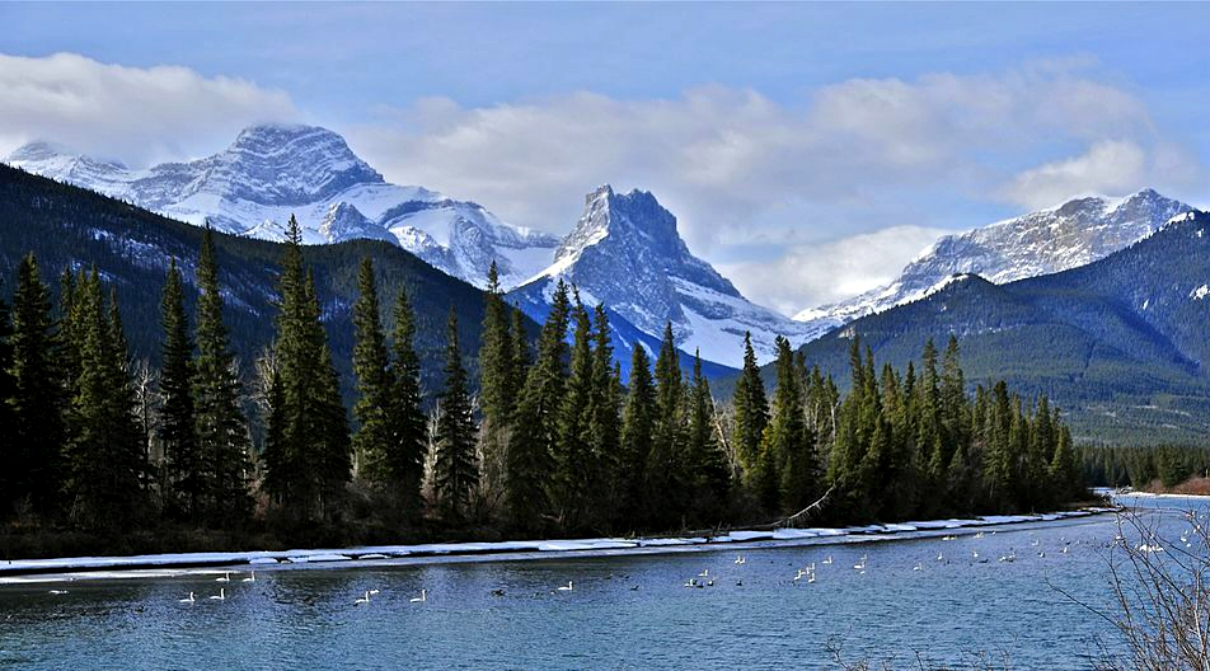
Windtower centered, Mount Lougheed to left

== See also ==
- List of mountains of Canada
- Geology of Alberta
