= Iron Lung =

An iron lung is a mechanical respirator.

Iron Lung may also refer to:

== Music ==
- Iron Lung (band), a punk band from Seattle
- Iron Lung, a 1993 EP by Pram
- My Iron Lung, a 1994 EP by Radiohead
  - "My Iron Lung", a song from the EP and their 1995 album The Bends
- "Iron Lung", a song by King Gizzard and the Lizard Wizard from the 2022 album Ice, Death, Planets, Lungs, Mushrooms and Lava

== Other media ==
- Iron Lung (video game), a 2022 horror game
  - Iron Lung (film), a 2026 screen adaptation
