= Iron hand (prosthesis) =

Artificial hand

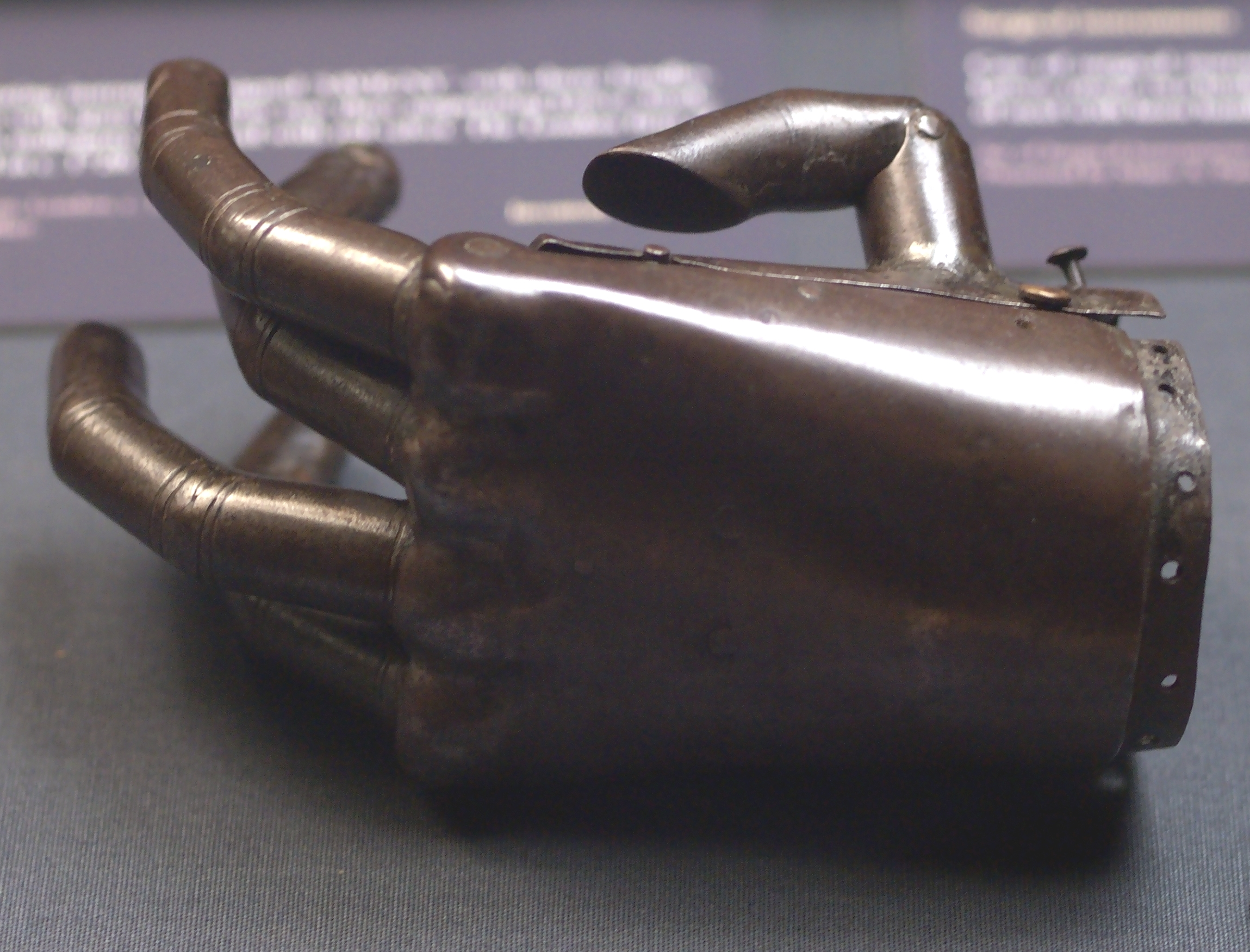
Iron hand, 16th century

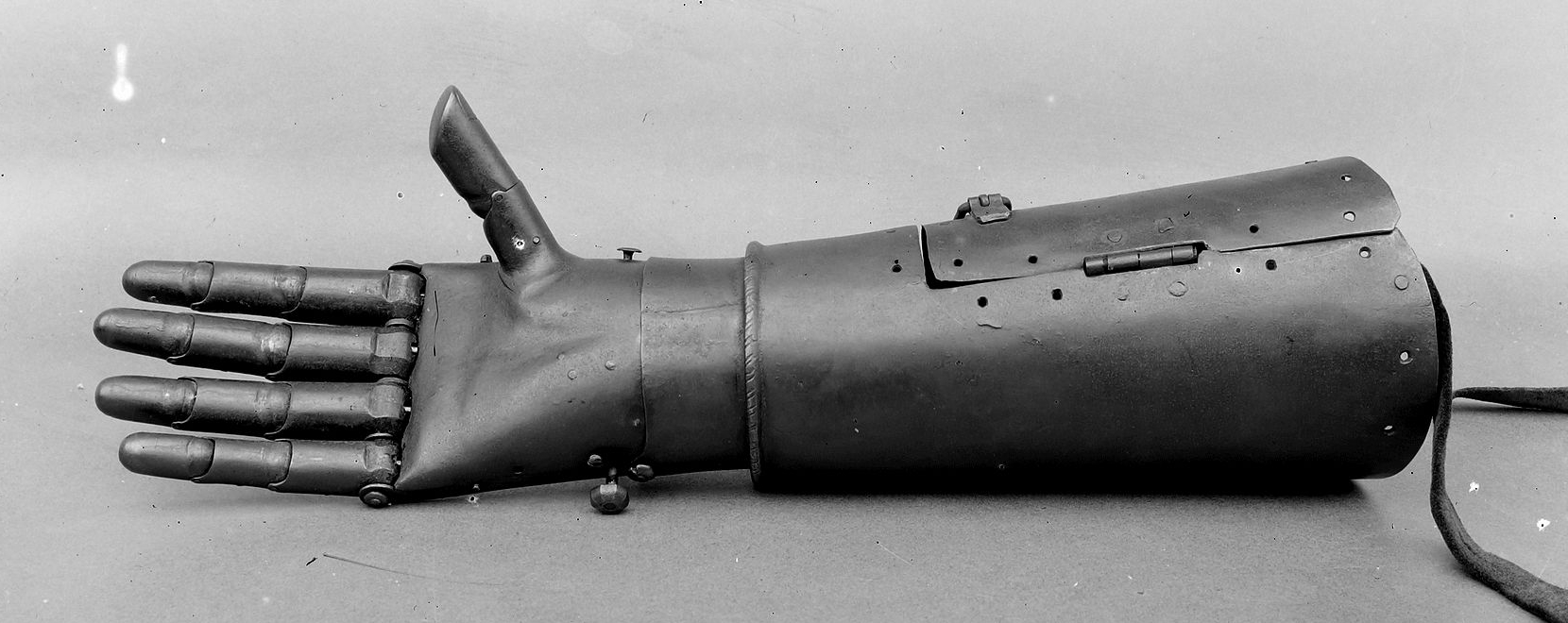
Second iron hand of Götz von Berlichingen, c. 1530

Iron hands are metal prostheses for hands and upper extremities from the Middle Ages and early modern period. These designs combined cosmetic and functional properties. The most famous example of an iron hand was made around the year 1530, being the second prosthetic hand made for the German knight Götz von Berlichingen.

Most iron hands are based on the same constructive principles, although there are considerable differences in complexity. Fingers can be flexed passively (for example using the healthy hand) and are locked in place by a ratchet mechanism, similar to those of contemporary flintlocks. Extension of the fingers works by spring pressure.

Löffler, Liebhard: Der Ersatz für die obere Extremität: die Entwicklung von den ersten Zeugnissen bis heute. Stuttgart: Enke 1984, ISBN 3-432-94591-4.

Putti, Vittorio: Historical Prostheses. In: Journal of Hand Surgery. Vol. 30, No. 3, Edinburgh: 2005, pp. 310–325.
