= Bassemberg =

- Commune
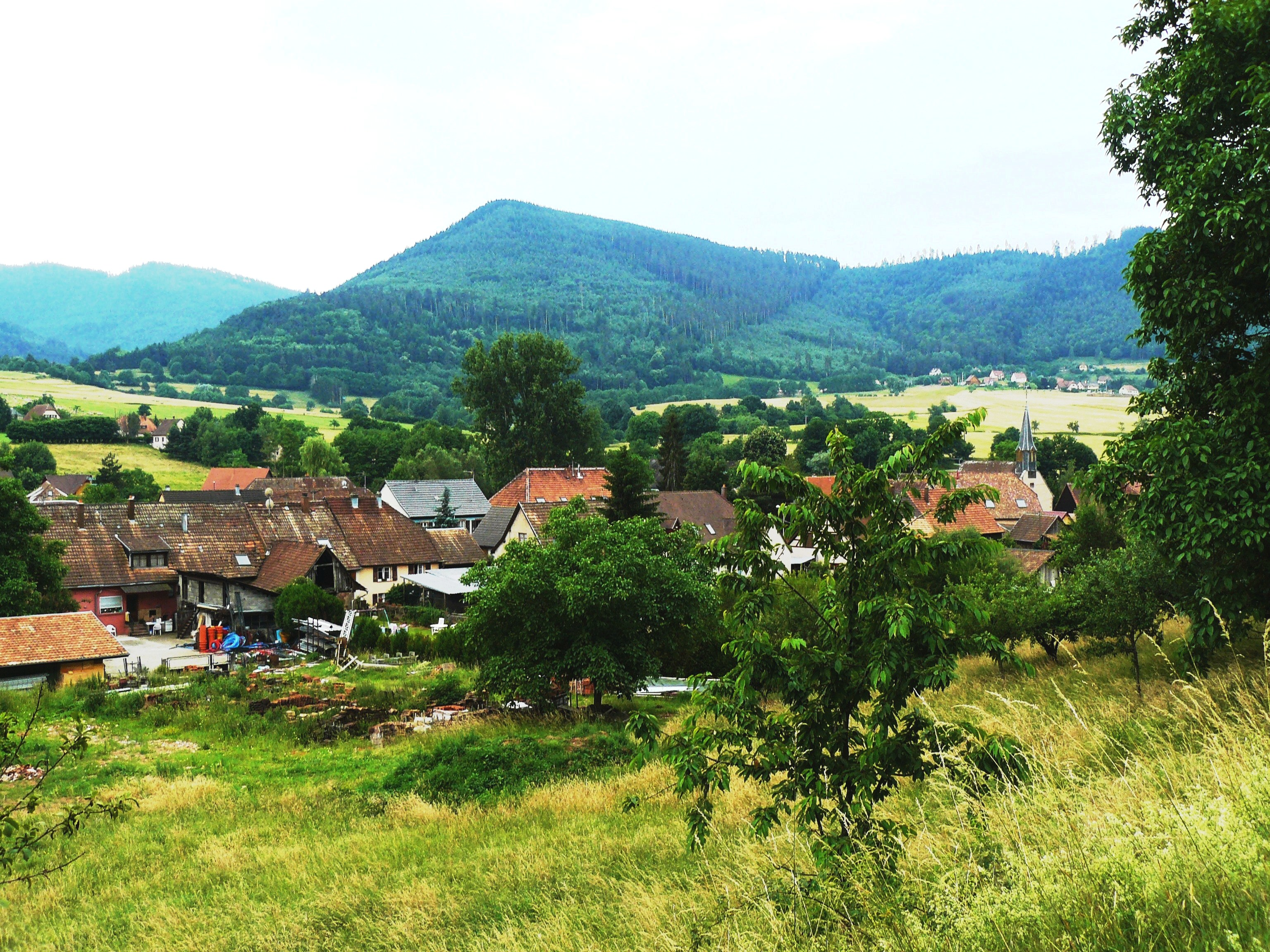
- A general view of Bassemberg

- Coat of arms
- Location of Bassemberg
- Location within France Location within Grand Est
- Coordinates: 48°20′07″N 7°17′03″E
- Country: France
- Region: Grand Est
- Department: Bas-Rhin
- Arrondissement: Sélestat-Erstein
- Canton: Mutzig
- Intercommunality: Vallée de Villé

Government
  - Mayor (2020–2026): Emmanuel Eschrich
- Area^{1}: 1.78 km^{2} (0.69 sq mi)
- Highest elevation: 616 m (2,021 ft)
- Lowest elevation: 275 m (902 ft)
- Population (2023): 222
  - Density: 125/km^{2} (323/sq mi)
- Time zone: UTC+01:00 (CET)
  - Summer (DST): UTC+02:00 (CEST)
- INSEE/Postal code: 67022 /67220
- ^{1} French Land Register data, which excludes lakes, ponds, glaciers > 1 km^{2} (0.386 sq mi or 247 acres) and river estuaries.

Bassemberg (German: Bassenberg) is a commune in the Bas-Rhin department in the Alsace region of north-eastern France.

The inhabitants of the commune are known as Bassembergeois or Bassembergeoises.

The commune has been awarded one flower by the National Council of Towns and Villages in Bloom in the Competition of cities and villages in Bloom.

== Geography ==
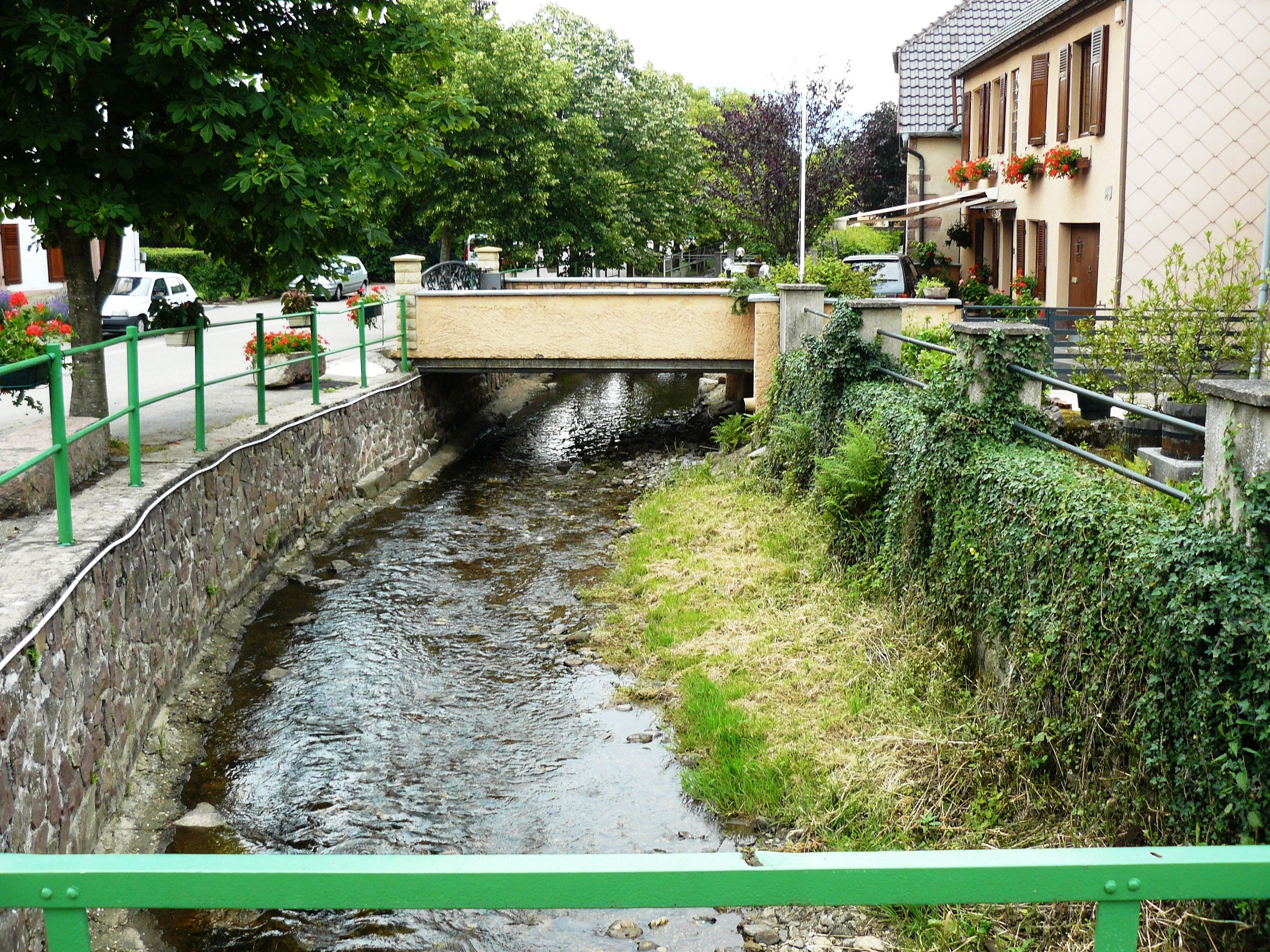
The Giessen at Bassemberg

Bassemberg is located 1 km south-west of Villé and 12 km north-west of Sélestat. The commune covers 178 hectares and is divided into two distinct areas separated by the valley of Giessen:

- On the north side is the southern slope of the Honel with an altitude of 475 m at Scheibenberg and 615 metres further west. Its steep slopes are covered with old cultivated forests.
- On the south-west side the commune encroaches slightly on the right bank of the Giessen towards Comte-Ban (Eichmatt farm sector). Regular and a few steep slopes rise from 280 to 330 metres above sea level and are suitable for agriculture.

The village is 280 metres above sea level at the foot of the slope of the Honel. Its location close to Giessen does not protect it from flooding of the river.

Access to the commune is by the D39 road from Villé in the north-east which passes through the commune and continues to Fouchy. The D97 from Neuve-Église also passes through the south of the commune and continues to Fouchy.

The Giessen river forms part of the southern border as it flows to the east through the village and continues east to join the Ill north of Muttersholtz.

=== Geology ===
The commune lies in the coal basin of the valley of Villé.

== Toponymy ==
In 1361 the area was called Bassenberg and became Bassemberg by the 18th century. The name may have come from an old German name Badubald meaning "the brave". Other interpretations may apply "der basse" meaning "wild boar": in this case a mountain boar.

Bassemberg appears as Bassemtrery on the 1750 Cassini Map and does not appear at all on the 1790 version.

== History ==
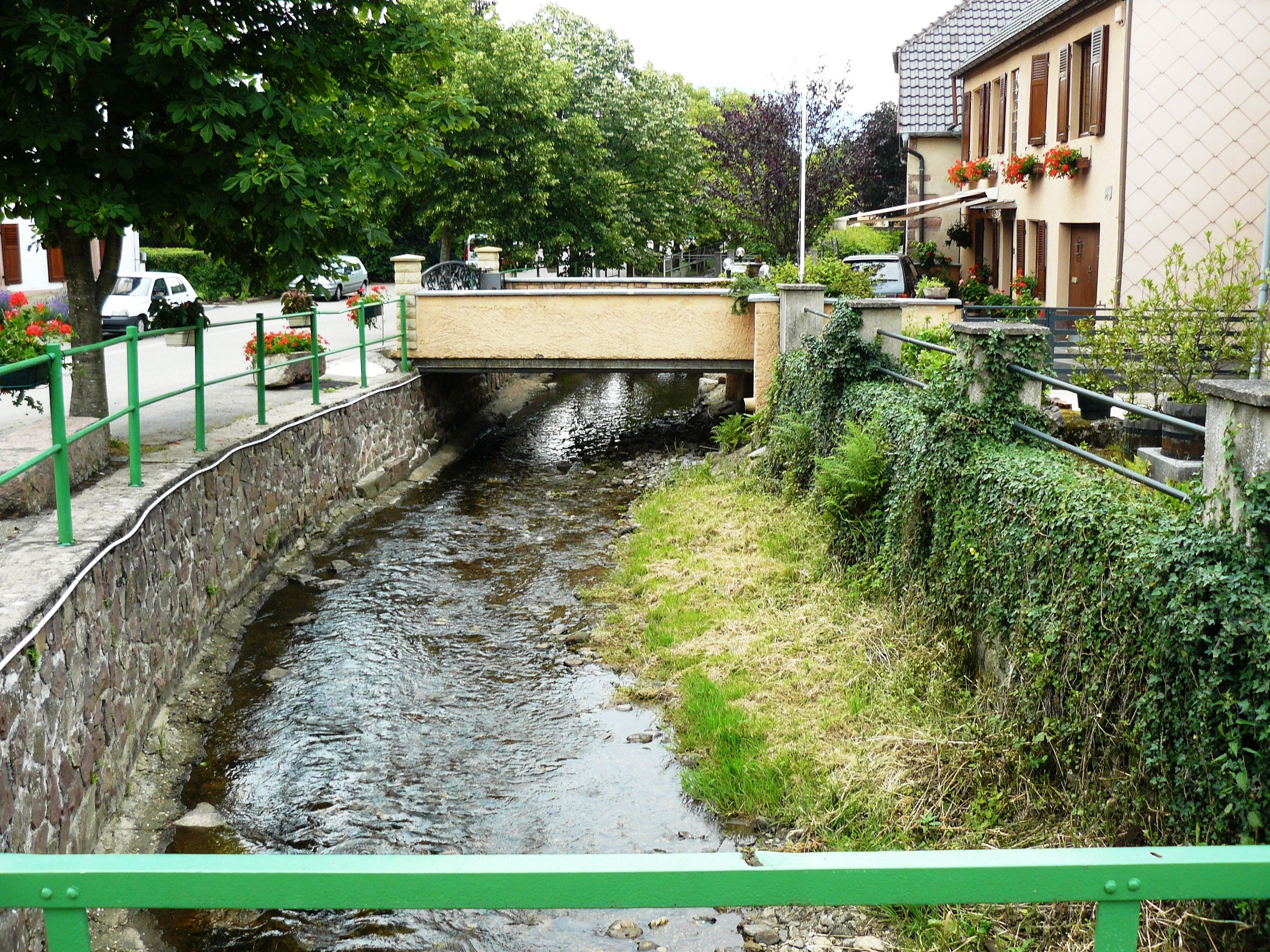
The Giessen at Bassemberg

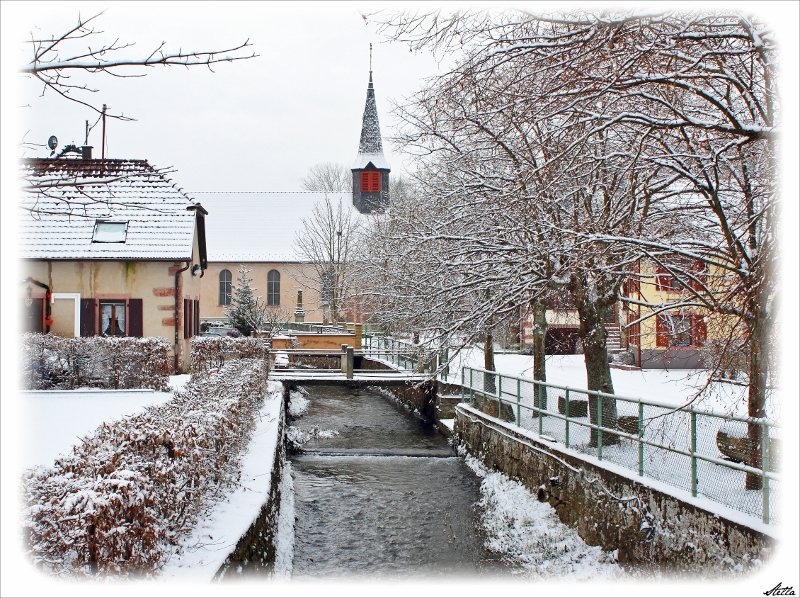
Winter in Bassemberg

=== A village belonging to Frederick Cuntzmann Hattstatt ===
The village was probably built in the Middle Ages on the ancient road connecting Villé to Saint-Dié-des-Vosges. The locality is mentioned for the first time in 1361 while it was in the hands of Frédéric de Cuntzmann de Hattstatt from a powerful Alsatian noble family. The village was probably formed around a mill and a bridge over the Scheer d'Urbeis. A statement from 1453 mentions a forest without mentioning vast grasslands around which for centuries serve as pretexts for many lawsuits with the neighbouring villages of Lalaye, Charbes, Fouchy, and Villé.

=== A settlement ===
After the end of conflicts that devastated the region (Armagnacs, War of the Peasants, Swedish War) Bassemberg adopted a regulation containing no less than 29 articles. This was in order to regulate rural policing and precisely specified rights to the forest, the vines, the shepherds, the horses, cattle, pigs, chickens, geese, and even dogs. It was so precise that "any individual, married or not, who wants to keep household shall, as a good citizen, submit to legal obligations otherwise he must leave the village".

=== A Jewish community ===
In the 19th century Bassemberg had a small Jewish community which did not exist at the census of 1784 but had 21 people in 1850. A synagogue was established in 1832. Thereafter the small community moved to Villé.

=== The 1914-1918 war ===
The First World War transformed the life of the village which was on the route of the "Londonbahn" that ran from June 1917 until the armistice of 11 November 1918. There was also a train station and a building that served as an arms and equipment warehouse to be carried on the front line at Bassemberg. On 24 November 1918, a child from Bassemberg, Emile Waechter, 9 years old, was the victim of a fatal accident on the road while playing on a wagon with friends. During the First World War the village lost 13 inhabitants.

=== Second World War ===
The village lost 12 inhabitants during the Second World War.

=== Heraldry ===
Arms of Bassemberg	Blazon: Or, a cross Azure cantoned with 20 billets the same, 5 per canton saltirewise.

== Administration ==
List of Successive Mayors

From	To	Name	Party	Position
2001	2014	André Barthelme		
2014	2026	Emmanuel Eschrich		

== Demography ==
Historical population

Year	Pop.	±% p.a.
1793	279	—
1821	387	+1.18%
1846	423	+0.36%
1871	380	−0.43%
1900	287	−0.96%
1926	252	−0.50%
1946	218	−0.72%
1962	213	−0.14%
1968	216	+0.23%

Year	Pop.	±% p.a.
1975	197	−1.31%
1982	187	−0.74%
1990	234	+2.84%
1999	232	−0.10%
2007	273	+2.06%
2012	261	−0.89%
2017	249	−0.94%
2023	222	−1.89%

Source: EHESS and INSEE

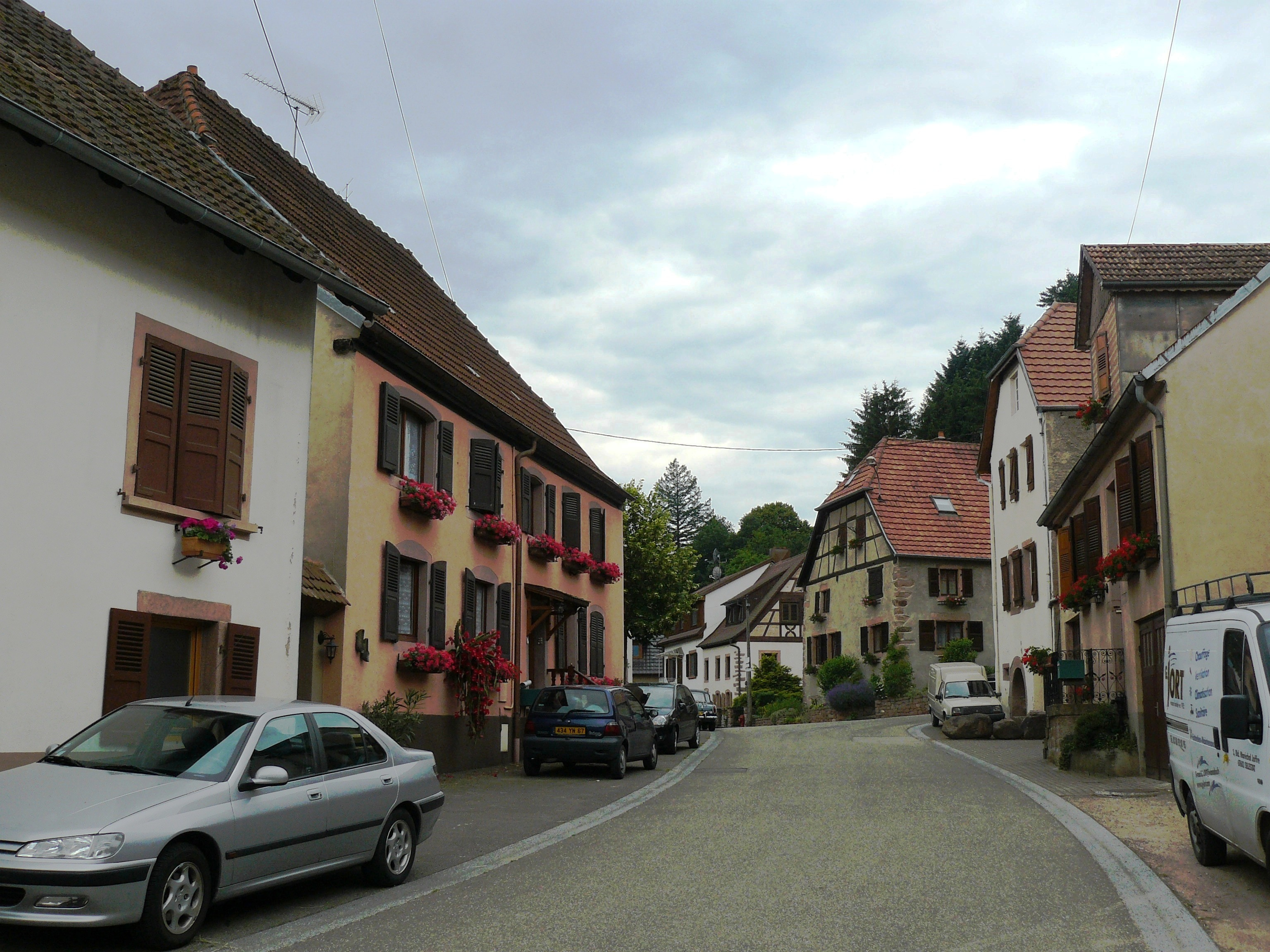
The main street of Bassemberg

== Culture and heritage ==
=== Architecture ===
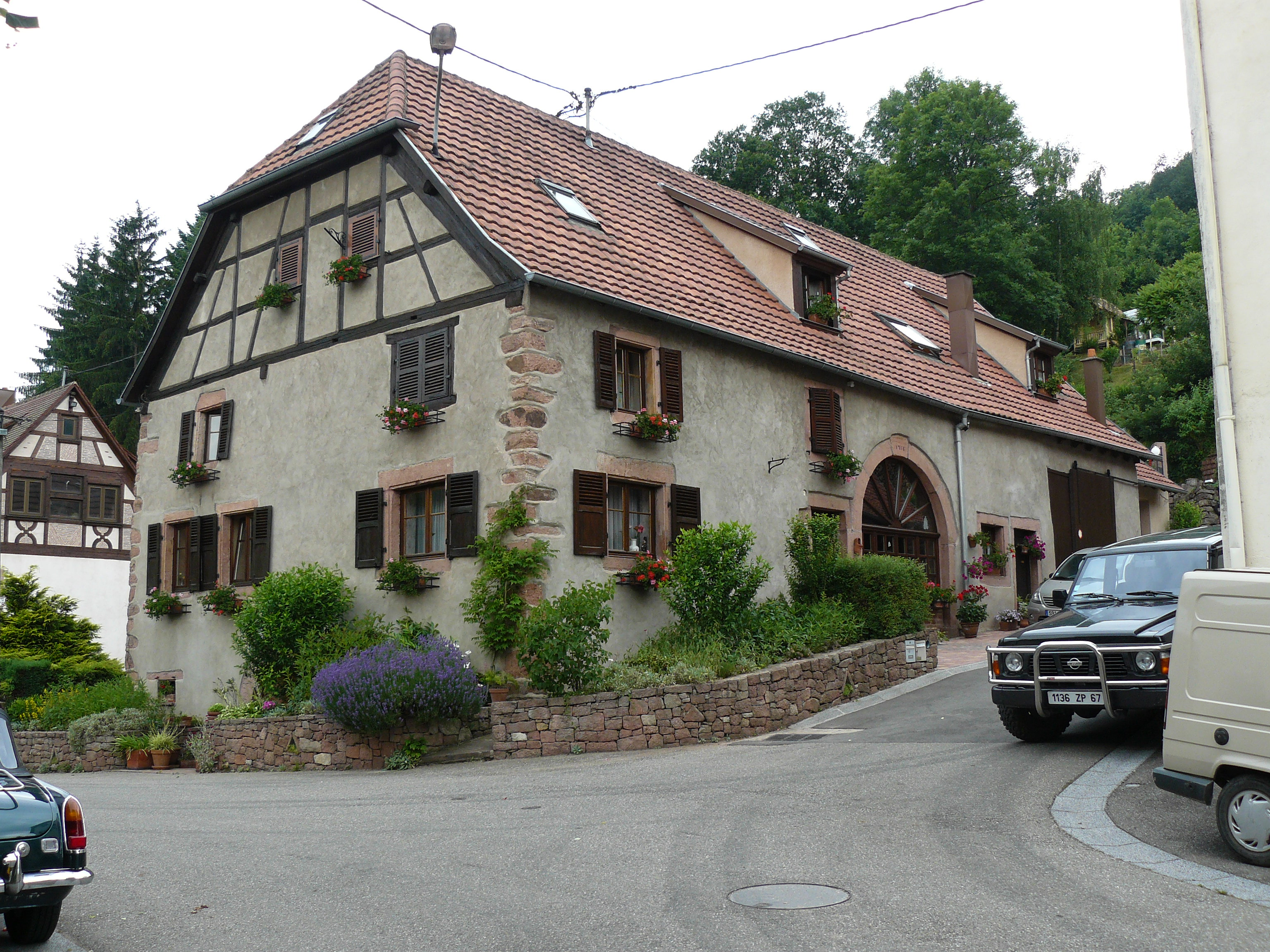
Old restored farmhouse in the Vosges style

Bassemberg developed along the road from Villé to Lalaye. The buildings followed the shape of the village street in an S shape. Their placement took into account the presence of the river. The buildings located on the floodplain have placed their storerooms on the ground floor with the living areas on the first floor. The houses have adopted the layout of Vosges type farms. The buildings are generally parallel to the street and, successively starting from the front: a gable wall, an arched entrance to the cellar, an access door to the house, an arched door to the barn, and a stable door. Some buildings date back to the 18th century. They are mostly modest sized buildings. Often due to lack of space they were joined in groups of two or three.

=== Civil heritage ===
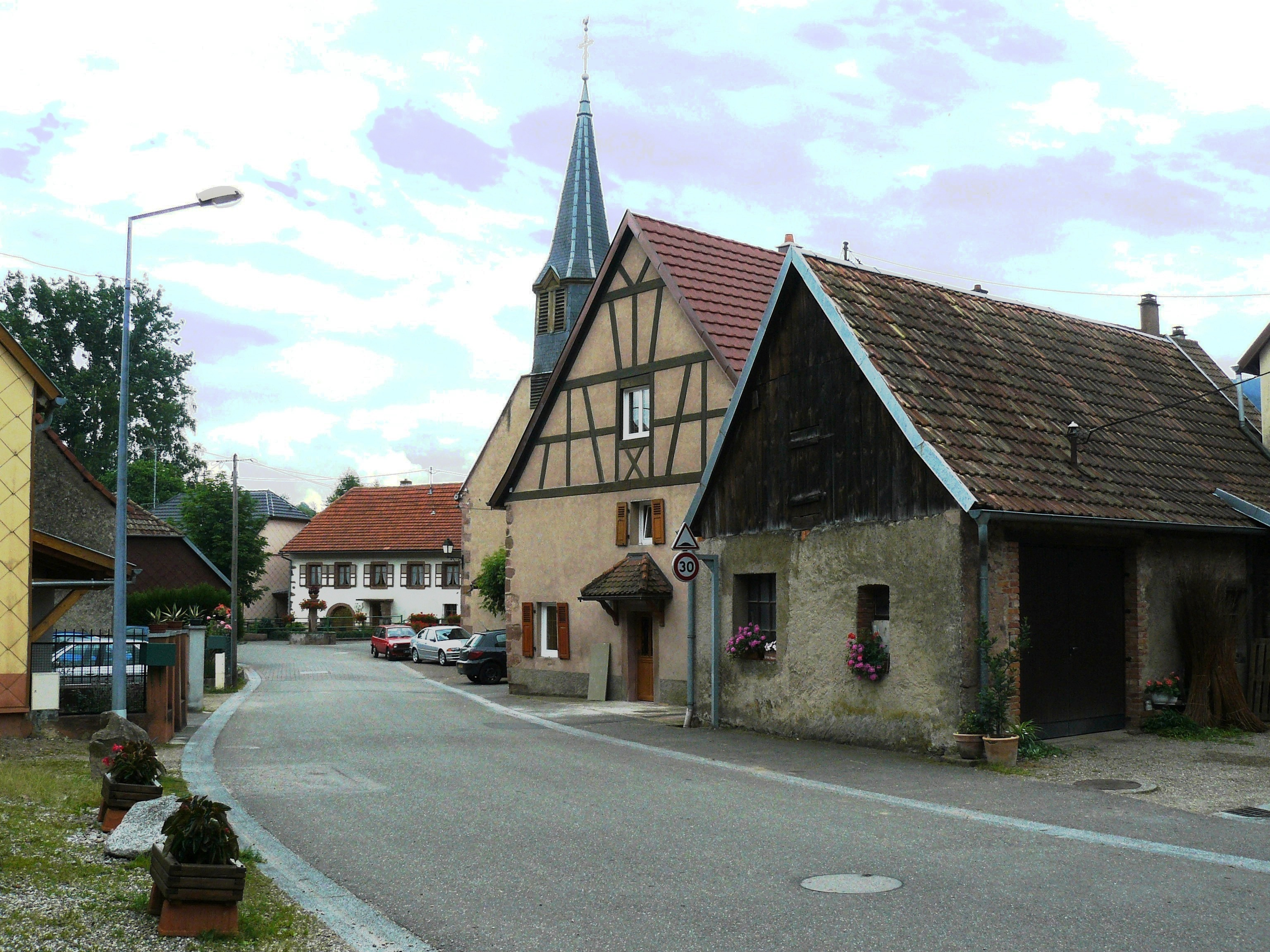
Rue Principale

- Milestones. The southern part of the ancient forest of Honcourt Abbey was bordered by milestones in 1757 which served as a border between Bassemberg and Saint-Martin. On the boundary between Villé and Bassemberg there are also four milestones from 1769 with the emblem of Villé.
- Second Empire Bench. At the exit from Bassemberg towards Fouchy on the left of the D39 is a bench in good condition from the Second Empire. It is one of five benches that were preserved in 1854 in the Val de Villé. They were erected in honor of the Empress Eugénie de Montijo.

The commune has a number of buildings and sites that are registered as historical monuments:

- The Town Hall and School Buildings (1838)
- A Farmhouse at 53 Rue Principale (19th century) This farmhouse contains a Tympanum that is registered as an historical object.
- A Farmhouse at 60 Rue Principale (1811)
- A Farmhouse at 62 Rue Principale (1718)
- A House at 67,68 Rue Principale (18th century)
- Houses and Farms (20th century)

=== Religious heritage ===
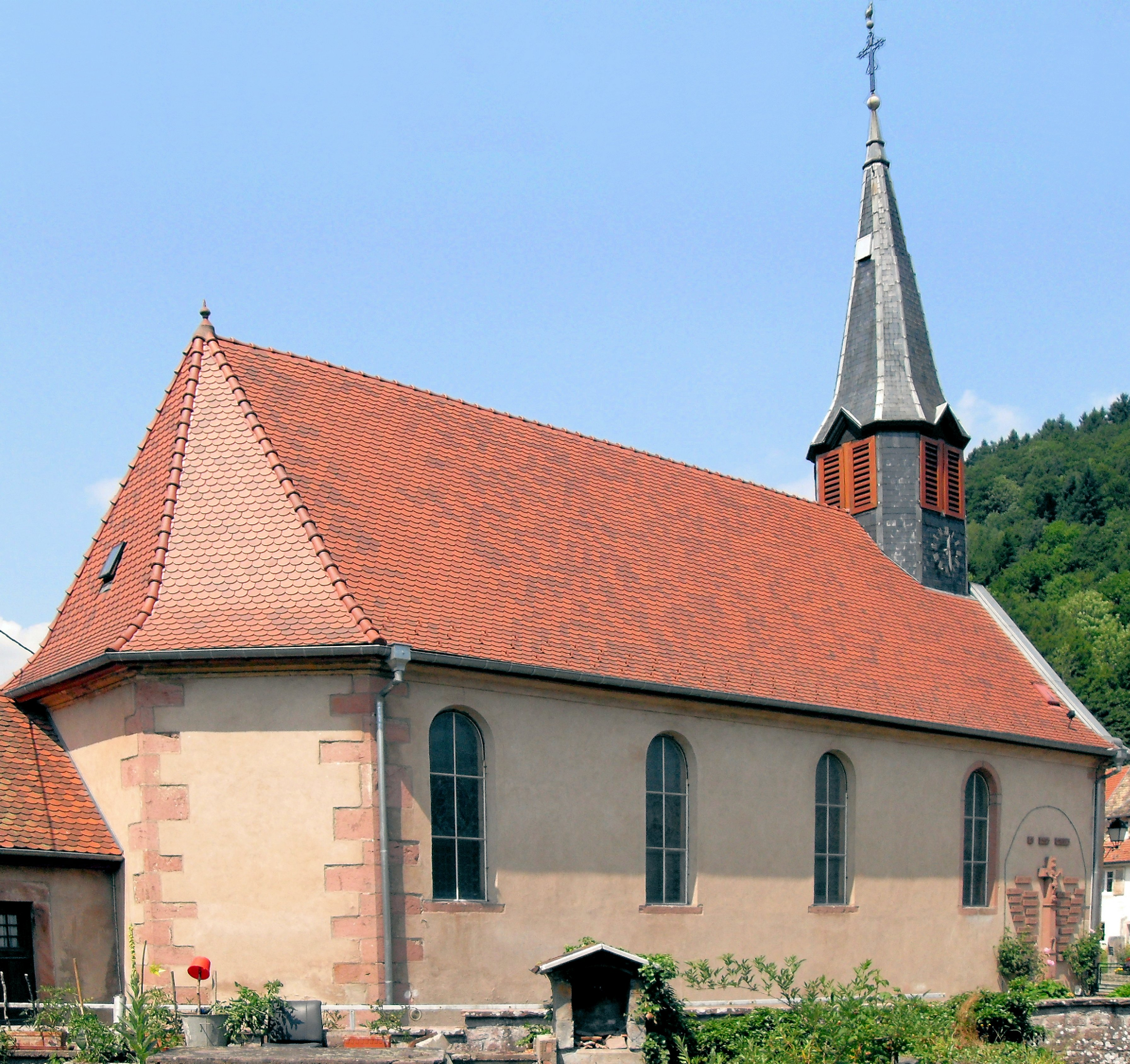
The Church of Saint-Quirin.

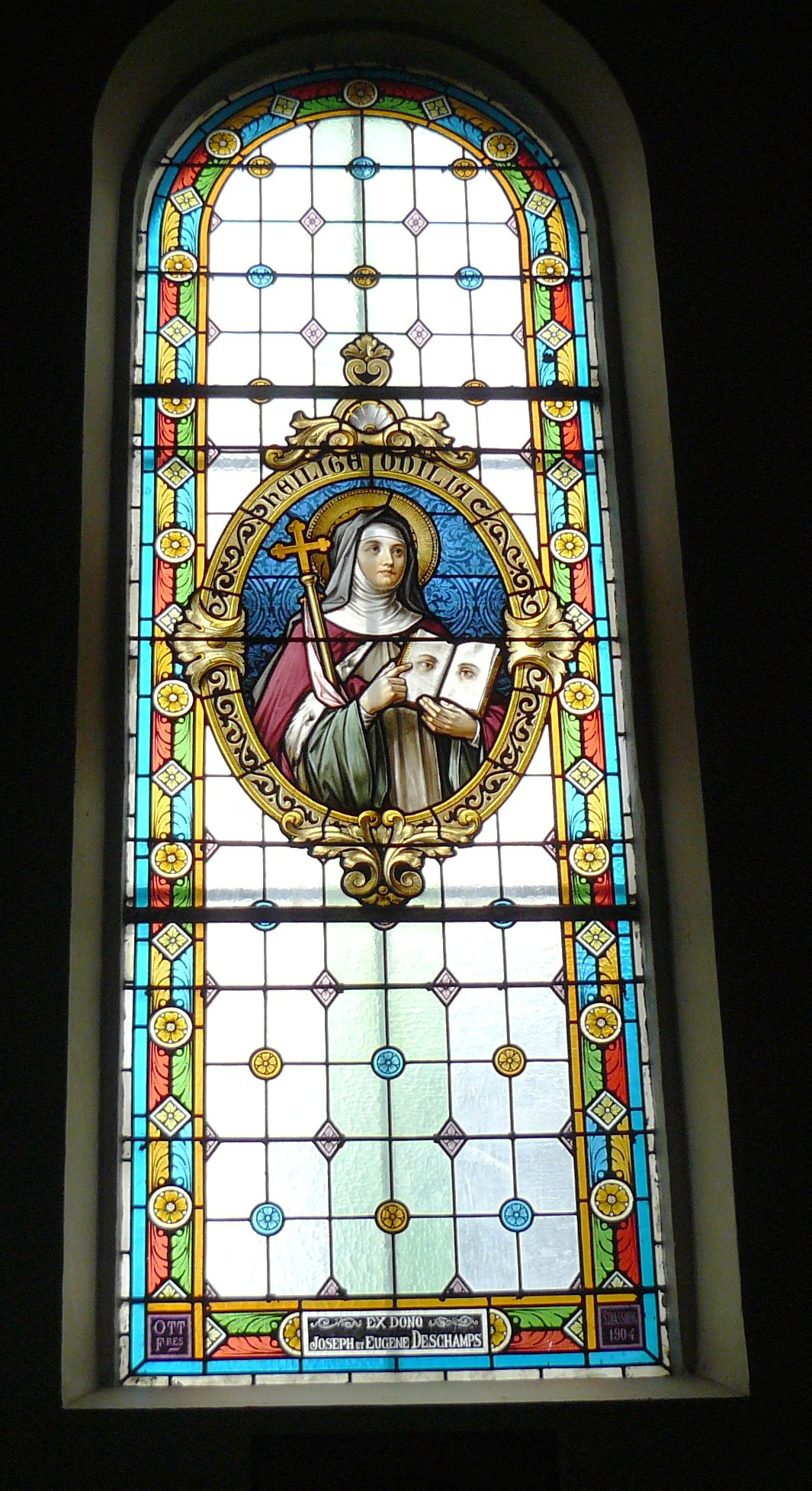
Stained Glass in the Church 1964

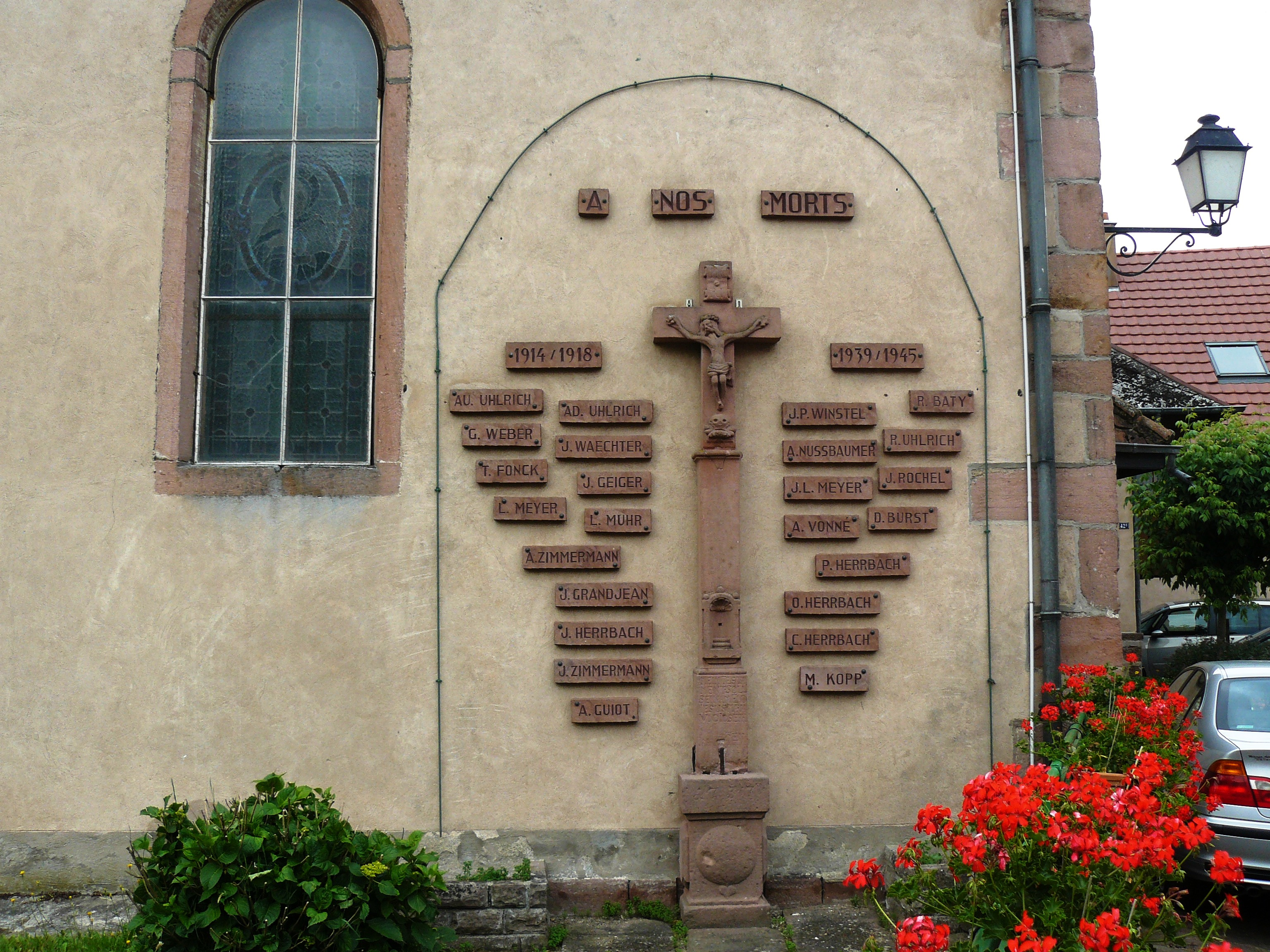
Cross from the 18th century on the Church

The Church of Saint Quirin was probably built around an old chapel in the 16th or 17th century. Rebuilt in 1751, it was enlarged in 1867 when the village was experiencing a demographic expansion. Bassemberg was once a place of local pilgrimage for people with rheumatism coming to implore the help of Saint Quirin. The pilgrims came mostly from the Val de Villé and did not have the means to go to the village of Saint-Quirin in the Moselle where the saint's head rested in a reliquary. Reflecting the size of the village, Bassemberg has only a modest church dedicated to Saint Quirin - a Roman martyr. A painting 2X3m to the right in the nave recalls the baptism of a Roman tribune converted to Christianity with his daughter Balbina by Pope Alexander I (105-117). First martyred on a gridiron they cut off successively his hand, foot, and tongue before finally being beheaded. The church is lit by stained glass from the workshops of Ott Brothers of Strasbourg. Two wooden pillars support a balcony where the first organ was installed in 1897. Classed in 1928 as an "old instrument and worthless", it was removed in 1958 by Schwenkedel and replaced by a harmonium and electronic organ. The Church is registered as an historical monument. The Church contains many items that are registered as historical objects:

- A Painting with frame: Baptism of the Tribune Quirin (1879)
- The Furniture in the Church
- A Monumental Cross: Christ on the Cross (1737)
- A Chalice with box (18th century)
- A Wayside Cross (1765)

Bassemberg has nine Calvaries still in perfect condition including five dating to the 18th century. The calvary in the old cemetery is the best preserved. Moved by the municipality for development, it is well protected by the long wall of the church. A finely carved niche surrounds the shaft where the inscription: Meint Testament Soll Sein Am / End Amen Jesus Maria und Joseph (My testament to my end must be Jesus, Mary and Joseph Amen). Below on the pedestal is engraved the year 1737. The Calvary is surrounded by the names of the victims of the two world wars.

Another cross from 1737 stands on the municipal boundary between Bassemberg and Breitenau near a reservoir. It unfortunately suffers from soiling due to two trees. It is a cross-milestone: the letters BB (Bassemberg / Breitenau) are engraved on the stock on either side of a floral pattern. At the foot is a milestone with arms that have been damaged by time and perhaps in the French Revolution. The coat of arms of Rathsamhausen Zum Stein, the one time owner of the lordship of Villé and that of the Grand Chapter of Strasbourg Cathedral, owner of Comte-Ban and therefore Breitenau. Another milestone of the same type is a little further on the way.

The Cemetery (1860) is registered as an historical monument. The movable items in the Cemetery are also registered as historical objects.

== Notable people linked to the commune ==
- Jean-Henri Navert, former priest of Bassemberg.

== See also ==
- Communes of the Bas-Rhin department

=== Bibliography ===
- Historical Society and Community of communes of the Canton of Villé, The Valley of Villé, a country, of men, a history, 1995, 482 pages. Document used for the writing of this article. (in French)
