= Fouchy =

- Commune
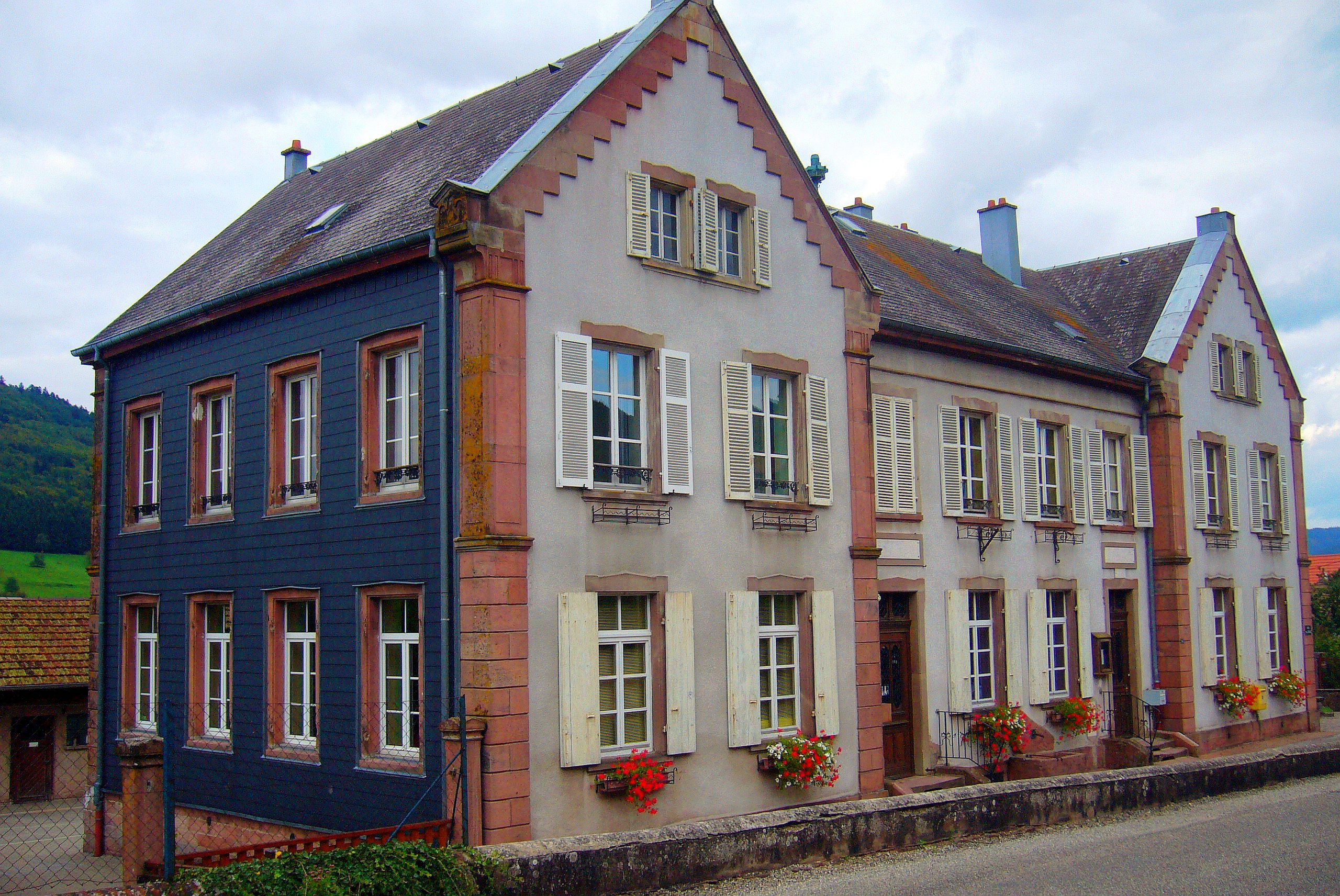
- The town hall in Fouchy

- Coat of arms
- Location of Fouchy
- Location within France Location within Grand Est
- Coordinates: 48°19′40″N 7°16′18″E
- Country: France
- Region: Grand Est
- Department: Bas-Rhin
- Arrondissement: Sélestat-Erstein
- Canton: Mutzig

Government
  - Mayor (2020–2026): Joffrey David
- Area^{1}: 7.87 km^{2} (3.04 sq mi)
- Highest elevation: 831 m (2,726 ft)
- Lowest elevation: 292 m (958 ft)
- Population (2023): 635
  - Density: 80.7/km^{2} (209/sq mi)
- Time zone: UTC+01:00 (CET)
  - Summer (DST): UTC+02:00 (CEST)
- INSEE/Postal code: 67143 /67220
- ^{1} French Land Register data, which excludes lakes, ponds, glaciers > 1 km^{2} (0.386 sq mi or 247 acres) and river estuaries.

Fouchy (French pronunciation: [fuʃi]; German: Grube im Weilertal) is a commune in the Bas-Rhin department in Alsace in north-eastern France.

It shares its latitude with the southern suburbs of Paris being located in the south-western corner of the department.

== Nomenclatures ==
Residents are called Fouchyssois.

The name Fouchy may derive from a German patois and relate to a noun or adjective, 'Fosche' or 'fossé' describing a large ditch or river bed. (The village is traversed by the River Giessen.) In the local Alsace dialect residents are called Fouchottes, a word that is disconcertingly similar to the French word for a fork (fourchette) (fourchette).

Long before Alsace became officially francophone the village was called Groba, which then mutated to Grube. The ancient Germanic name of Grube was revived after 1871 when Alsace found itself incorporated within the German Empire and again during the German occupation between 1940 and 1944.

== Geography ==
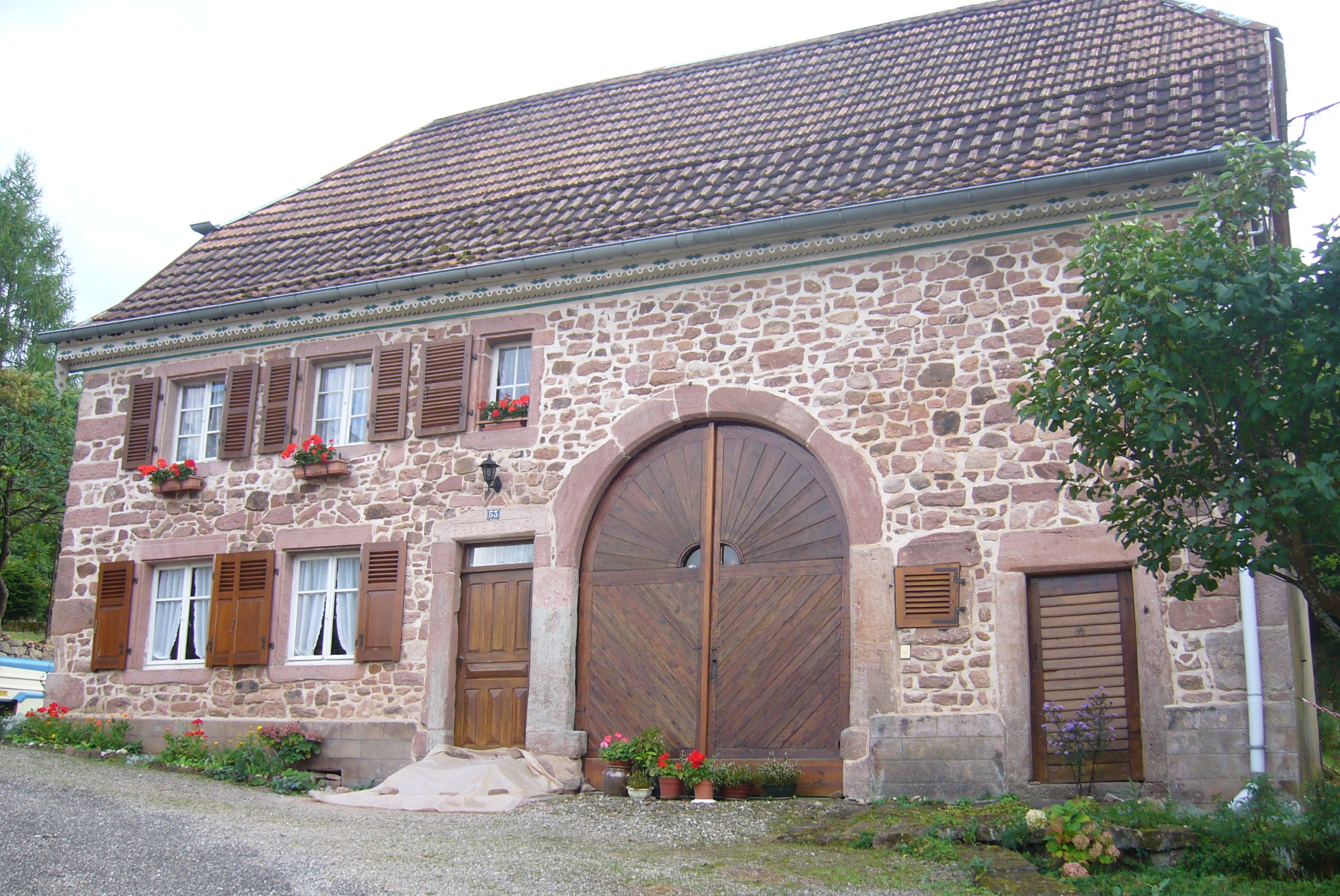
Fouchy: recently restored nineteenth century farmhouse

Located on the left bank of the little River Giessen, Fouchy occupies a site of 787 hectares embraced on one side by the river and faced on its north side by wooded hills culminating in the peaks of the Guichat and Rougerain, respectively 623 meters and 650 meters above sea level. The altitude of the village itself is very varied, but 300 meters is a reasonable average (median) value. The southern part of the village rests on the dividing ridge between the valleys of the Giessen and of the River Liepvrette: this ridge rises from 690 meters in the east to 830 meters at the Schnarupt peak, dominating the hamlet of Hingie in the adjacent commune of Rombach-le-Franc. The ridge is traversed by the 608 meter high Fouchy which connects the two valleys.

From outside the village, it is dominated by the spire of the church, and this is the focus from which Fouchy's streets radiate. One route runs to the bottom of the valley, and leads out of the village towards Saint-Dié: scattered farms comprise a few hamlets some of the larger ones being La Combre, Berlicombelle, Noirceux, Rouhu, Schlingoutte, and Schnarupt. To the west, along the departmental road D39, is the village of Urbeis while three kilometers to the east, the same road leads to Villé.

== History ==
=== Early records ===
The village of Fouchy (Groba) is first documented around 1150, at which time the village was part of the patrimony of the Convent of St Faith in Sélestat. Originally the settlement would have been located in a clearing, supported by a few fields cleared from the surrounding woodlands. Some value would have come to the convent from the economic potential of the woodlands, but the valley had also a considerable strategic importance. Linking Alsace to Lorraine along the route through Villé and Urbeis, the route had commercial significance in that it provided an alternative route for the important trade in salt from nearby deposits in the eastern part of Lorraine. The salt trade otherwise was dependent of the state of Steige Pass, which would have presented challenges during the cold wet weather that is still a frequent feature of the weather in this region. The convent exploited the Fouchy route, charging a toll for merchandise conveyed along it.

Until the late Medieval period, the valley, part of a route between Alsace and Lorraine, played an intriguing role as an interface between the two very different worlds of the residual Gallo-Roman heritage on the one hand and the Germanic sphere on the other. This is one reason why lives in the valley have been regularly shaken by crimes and betrayals which have, on occasion, sent their shock waves across Europe. But probably it is only since a little before 1150 that a small group of men came to clear the forest and create a permanent settlement in what, then, they would have called Groba. For the next two hundred years the wealth of Fouchy lands and the surrounding forests offered tempting prizes to local property holders. An example is provided by a legal case which the Convent of St Faith found itself in opposition to the Abbey of Honcourt and the Villé priest, Father Huno. Honcourt Abbey provided religious instruction to populations subject to the Convent of St faith, in return for which they expected payment. However, in a judgment of 1169/70 the court rejected the claim of Honcourt Abbey and Father Huno on the Fouchy tithe, which thereby remained payable in full to Convent of St Faith. Later on in 1170 the court's judgment was upheld in favour of the convent by the Pope, on the grounds that the parish of Fouchy was considered to be a part of the property of the Convent of St Faith which was thereby entitled to exercise within the parish all rights concerning tithes, along with fees for baptisms and burials. Just over a century later, in 1309, we find a papal bull requiring the Abbey of Ebersmunster to restore assets alienated from the church at Fouchy. Suffering of a different sort is recorded around 1313 when the citizens of Fouchy were touched by plague, and between 1348 and 1349 they were attacked by the Black Death which ravaged western Europe at this time. These were also years during which Fouchy experienced a particularly high and unwelcome level of attention from passing armies and other pillaging hoards, leaving behind them desolation and misery.

=== Late Medieval ===
In 1359 Fouchy was incorporated within Ban county while retaining its ecclesiastical relationship with the convent at Sélestat. Later, in 1489, the district passed into the control of the cathedral chapter of Strasbourg.

The influence of the Convent of St Faith diminished progressively after 1217 when Sélestat was granted the rights and status of a free city. Increasingly the convent found itself competing with a growing mercantile class in the young city, and in the process conceding its traditional rights and possessions to the increasingly assertive middle class. That is the context in which, following the population collapse caused by the black death, "Grube et Breytenowe" (Fouchy and Breitenau) were ceded to the lords of Frankenbourg, and came to form a part of Ban County. Fouchy now would share its destiny with the neighboring settlements of Neuve-Église, Hirtzelbach, Dieffenbach-au-Val and Neubois. In the same year, the Ban county along with the Castle of Frankenbourg were purchased by the Bishop of Strasbourg, John of Lichtenberg. Fouchy thus became an episcopal possession of Strasbourg while continuing to depend for its spiritual sustenance on the Convent of St Faith in Sélestat.

However, during the fifteenth century the spiritual influence exercised by the convent diminished, and in 1464 it was the abbot of Honcourt Abbey who appointed the Fouchy rector. In its turn, the power of Honcourt declined and in 1594 Honcourt Abbey came under the control of Andlau Abbey.

=== The ravages of the Middle Ages ===
Because of its position on a strategic route between Lorraine and Alsace, Fouchy periodically encountered by transiting armies and pillagers. It was overrun by the Armagnacs in 1444-1445 and endured twenty -five years later the presence of Peter of Hagenbach and his men. Hagenbach was a Burgundian knight in command of the Ninth Regiment of Charles the Bold. In 1474 Hagenbach would, according to some sources, be executed for war crimes: his reputation was one of corruption and brutality. In 1470 he turned up in the valley of Villé, accompanied by a band estimated at 5,000 horsemen, en route towards the Pass of Steige. The first night he spent at Villé, which he took over along with the Castle of Ortenburg: the next day he established his headquarters at Châtenois, committing numerous atrocities in the process. He marched on Colmar where he encountered fierce resistance. He then turned his attention to Breisach where he would be killed. Charles the Bold himself would be killed in battle at Nancy less than three years later, leaving behind him a disputed succession which would sow the seeds for the end of the Burgundian Kingdom. Alsace had been part of the empire since Ottonian times, and as the fifteenth century drew to a close the directing influence of the Holy Roman Empire became more visible with the emperor Frederick III and his Habsburg dynasty exercising increased levels of central control from Vienna.

Life in the valley became relatively peaceful until 1493 when new troubles erupted: this time the source of the problem was closer to home. There was an uprising of peasant farmers from the areas of Sélestat, Dambach, Stotzheim, Châtenois, Scherwiller and Dieffenthal. They were inspired by a former mayor of Sélestat called Jean Uhlmann. Other rebel leaders were Jacques Hanser from Blienschwiller and Nicolas Ziegler from Stotzheim. Ulhmann soon gave up and sought refuge in Basel where he was arrested, convicted and put to death, his body subsequently being quartered. As he died he declared to his judges, "sooner or later, the people's alliance will win". Nicholas Zielger met a similar fate at Sélestat: it is not known what became of Jacques Hanser. Other leading protagonists were captured and punished: some had their fingers cut off while others were banished or fined. The Peasants' uprising of 1493 failed miserably thanks to measures implemented by the emperor's son, the future Emperor Maximilian, when he found himself in Colmar on the way home from Burgundy.

The idea of greater independence and social justice for impoverished peasants had certainly not permanently disappeared, however. Such notions continued to be advocated by committed reformers and found a receptive audience among the people, putting pressure on landowners. In 1524 the 'Peasants' War' broke out. In 1525 the inhabitants of Fouchy undoubtedly participated in the fighting, and some undoubtedly were lost on the Battle of Scherwiller. In any event, there is evidence of a savage population reduction.

=== Fouchy in the Thirty Years War ===
By 1618 when war broke out, advances in weapons technology and in military organisation had made warfare significantly more lethal, even, than it had been in the Medieval period, not merely for soldiers but also for any civilian populations that found themselves in the wrong place. Located on a principal communications route, Fouchy was one of several villages in the valley that suffered badly during the Thirty Years' War: villagers were frequently forced to seek safety in the forest and many houses were destroyed. Of the fifty-eight houses in the village in 1618, only twenty-five were habitable thirty years later. By 1648 many of the propertied families in the village had simply disappeared: the overall population had declined to 364 by 1660, from a prewar level of 1,050. The valley was ruined economically: climate deterioration experienced in northern Europe during the first half of the seventeenth century will have done nothing to help the survivors at harvest time. Recovery would come to Fouchy only slowly.

=== Repopulation ===
The Treaty of Westphalia confirmed the conquest of Alsace by France, and in due course the French state addressed the challenge of rebuilding population levels in its new eastern territories. In about November 1662 the government issued an order encouraging former owners of abandoned lands to return and reclaim their former properties, and in addition encouraging newcomers to colonise the abandoned territories in the region. The only condition imposed on newcomers wishing to settle in the villages was that they must be Roman Catholics. Powerful incentives for newcomers included the offer of a five-year exemption from taxation. The policy succeeded, with immigrants arriving from nearby parts of Lorraine, across the Vosges Mountains as well as from more distant places. By 1801 the population would be back up to 696 as the village was rebuilt around the church. Today the year 17.. inscribed on several of the older houses in the centre of the village bears silent testimony to a century of peace and reconstruction. These houses are generally of traditional Vosgien stone built construction with a house on one end and a stable at the other, and a barn in the middle. A long corridor from the front leads to a large kitchen at the rear. The stone used is the local sandstone, and the walls are coated with plaster.

=== Revolutionary Fouchy ===
The parish was spared the worst excesses of the revolution: Mass continued to be celebrated, but the priests avoided drawing attention to themselves and major damage was avoided by means of a ruse in which the parishioners collaborated. To escape the attention of fanatical 'patriots', the fine 18th century presbytery was quietly converted into an inn, complete with its own 'dance room'. Revolutionary fanatics nevertheless did attack rural crosses, though the extent of resulting destruction is hard to assess two centuries later since many crosses appear to have been erected in the nineteenth century and it is no longer clear how far these replace pre-revolutionary forerunners.

== Notable people ==
- Pierre Adrian

== See also ==
- Communes of the Bas-Rhin department
