= Lalaye =

- Commune
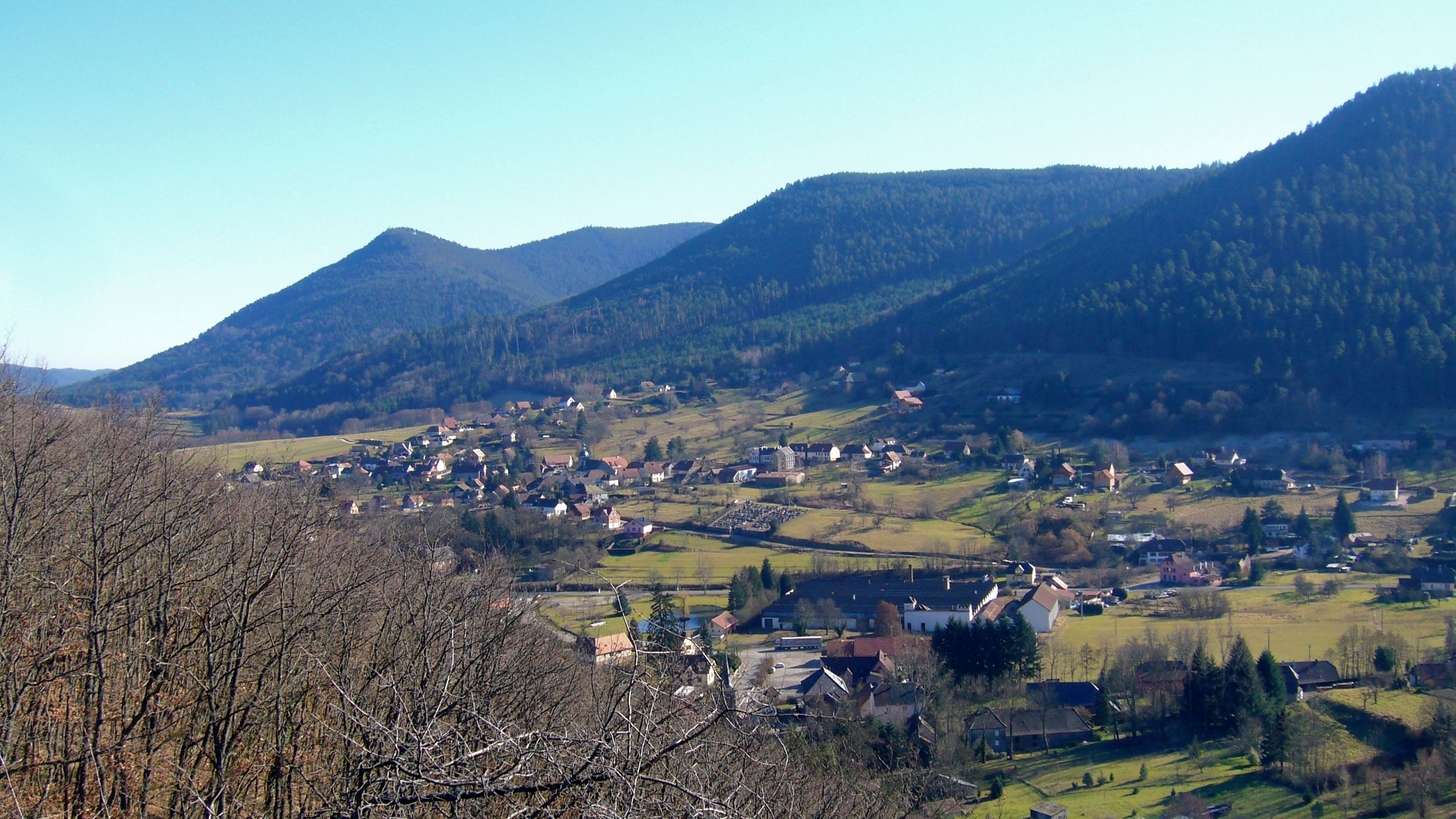
- A general view of Lalaye

- Coat of arms
- Location of Lalaye
- Location within France Location within Grand Est
- Coordinates: 48°19′52″N 7°15′55″E
- Country: France
- Region: Grand Est
- Department: Bas-Rhin
- Arrondissement: Sélestat-Erstein
- Canton: Mutzig

Government
  - Mayor (2020–2026): Yvette Walspurger
- Area^{1}: 8.18 km^{2} (3.16 sq mi)
- Highest elevation: 822 m (2,697 ft)
- Lowest elevation: 297 m (974 ft)
- Population (2023): 481
  - Density: 58.8/km^{2} (152/sq mi)
- Time zone: UTC+01:00 (CET)
  - Summer (DST): UTC+02:00 (CEST)
- INSEE/Postal code: 67255 /67220
- ^{1} French Land Register data, which excludes lakes, ponds, glaciers > 1 km^{2} (0.386 sq mi or 247 acres) and river estuaries.

Lalaye (French pronunciation: [lalɛ]; German: Lach) is a commune in the southwest of the Bas-Rhin department in Grand Est in north-eastern France.

The inhabitants are known as Lachenois.

== Geography ==
Lalaye is positioned approximately fifteen kilometres (nine miles) to the west-north-west of Sélestat on the departmental road D39, one of a number of minor roads that twists across the Vosges Mountains into Lorraine. It is three kilometres (two miles) upstream of the town Villé and on the left bank of a branch of the Giessen river which tumbles down from Urbeis to the west-south-west. To the north the commune is bounded by the Honel ridge which continues at an altitude of around 600 meters to the Blanc-Noyer peak (822 meters) which dominates the area. To the south a line of lower peaks running from the Kohlberg (500 meters) to the Goutte Henri (610 meters) a separates the Urbeis Giessen from the "Giessen proper".

The village itself is positioned at the lower end of the valley, having an average elevation of just 310 meters, shortly before the Charbes stream and the Urbeis Giessen converge. The houses are stretched along the south facing side of the narrow Charbes valley.

== Mining ==
The commune contains significant mineral deposits and has a long mining tradition: the oldest evidence of exploitation is in place known as La Hollée. The principal mineral here, galena (lead ore) was being extracted on a daily basis at the end of the Middle Ages. Along the route to the hamlet of Charbes is another mine known by the local language name of "Haus Osterreich" and which was worked during the sixteenth and early seventeenth centuries. Both these sites have been subjected to several modern investigatory excavations, during the course of which an ancient well was discovered which was equipped with a water wheel and a two chamber water pump.

Seams of antimony at Wolfsloch were mined during the same period, for a century between 1648 and 1748. More important was the coal mining, which provided high quality coal, principally used in forges. After lapsing for several years, mining returned to the village during the German occupation in 1901. Other mines, some better documented than others, include those at Sachelingoutte (sixteenth century), Pransureux, Le Beheu and Ruisseau.

An old mylonite quarry which was still being exploited after the Second World War is located at Molloch, on a part of the same site as the old lead mine at La Hollée. The rock extracted here was chiefly used as an underlay rock for road construction.

== History ==
=== Etymology ===
The name Lalaye comes from the German and local dialect name "Lach" and from the Latinate patois equivalent "Lela". A range of spelling variants turns up through the centuries. The Germanic name "Lach" is recorded in 1303 and again in 1561. Following the French occupation of Alsace, francophone versions gain currency: La Ley in 1768, Lallay on Cassini's eighteenth century maps, Lalay in 1758 and finally Lalaye. As in the rest of Alsace, periods of German occupation between 1871 and 1918, and again between 1940 and 1944, saw a return to German versions of the name.

=== Origins as part of the Villé seigniory ===
The precise age of the village is not known. The first surviving record of it appears in an inventory compiled in 1303 by a notary named Burkhard von Fricke who was working for the powerful Habsburg family. In the middle of the thirteenth century the Habsburgs owned the Albrecht Valley: the notary's task was to inventory the family's rights and revenues in all the villages including "Lach". Subsequently the village passed through several hands, either in absolute possession or else as a fiefdom. Most noteworthy among these proprietors were the Rathsamhausen zum Stein family and, later, the noble Bollwiller family.

=== The Thirty Years' War ===
Lalaye was one of many Alsatian villages ruined by the Thirty Years' War. After 1648 the French entrusted the Lalaye lands to Choiseul-Meuse. The village was repopulated by migrants from Lorraine who brought their latinate patois with them.

=== Religious ===
The Roman Catholic community of Lalaye was affiliated to the parish of nearby Villé: it was therefore necessary for citizens to make the four kilometre (two and a half mile) trek to Villé in order to attend Sunday Mass. Later, in 1665, a report on "The Condition of the Parishes" in the Villé lordship mentions the lack of any chapel at Mittelscheer, but indicates the presence of a suitable building at Lalaye (at that time still called Lach) in good condition and dedicated to Saint Dorothy. At the time the Abbess of Andlau enjoyed the tithe while the priest from Villé administered this chapel and celebrated the mass in it.

In 1777 the old chapel was demolished and work began on a church, planned by the architect Christiani and which would be built on the same spot. The church was far larger than the chapel it replaced, which had become necessary because of immigration to the village during the eighteenth century. Between 1720 and 1750 the size of the registered congregation increased from about twenty souls to about fifty. In 1803 a vicar was assigned to Lalaye-Charbes, and from 1810 he was able to reside in a newly constructed presbytery. Lalaye obtained parish status in 1820.

=== Emigration ===
From the nineteenth century Lalaye experienced a major population exodus, primarily due to a lack of work in the valley. Some residents migrated to cities such as Paris while others crossed the Atlantic to the United States or, like the missionary Jean Gaire, to Canada. Often early emigrants were joined subsequently by others from the commune.

=== Schools ===
Two schools were constructed during the nineteenth century: one at Charbes in 1832 and the other at Lalaye in 1860.

=== Twentieth century ===
The village was relatively lightly touched by the two great wars of the twentieth century. During the First World War the village lost 17 inhabitants, and 14 during the Second World War.

== People ==
- Jean Gaire 1853 - 1925, missionary to the Canadians, was born in Lalaye.

== See also ==
- Communes of the Bas-Rhin department
