= Honcourt Abbey =

Benedictine abbey in France

Coordinates: 48°20′58″N 7°16′58″E

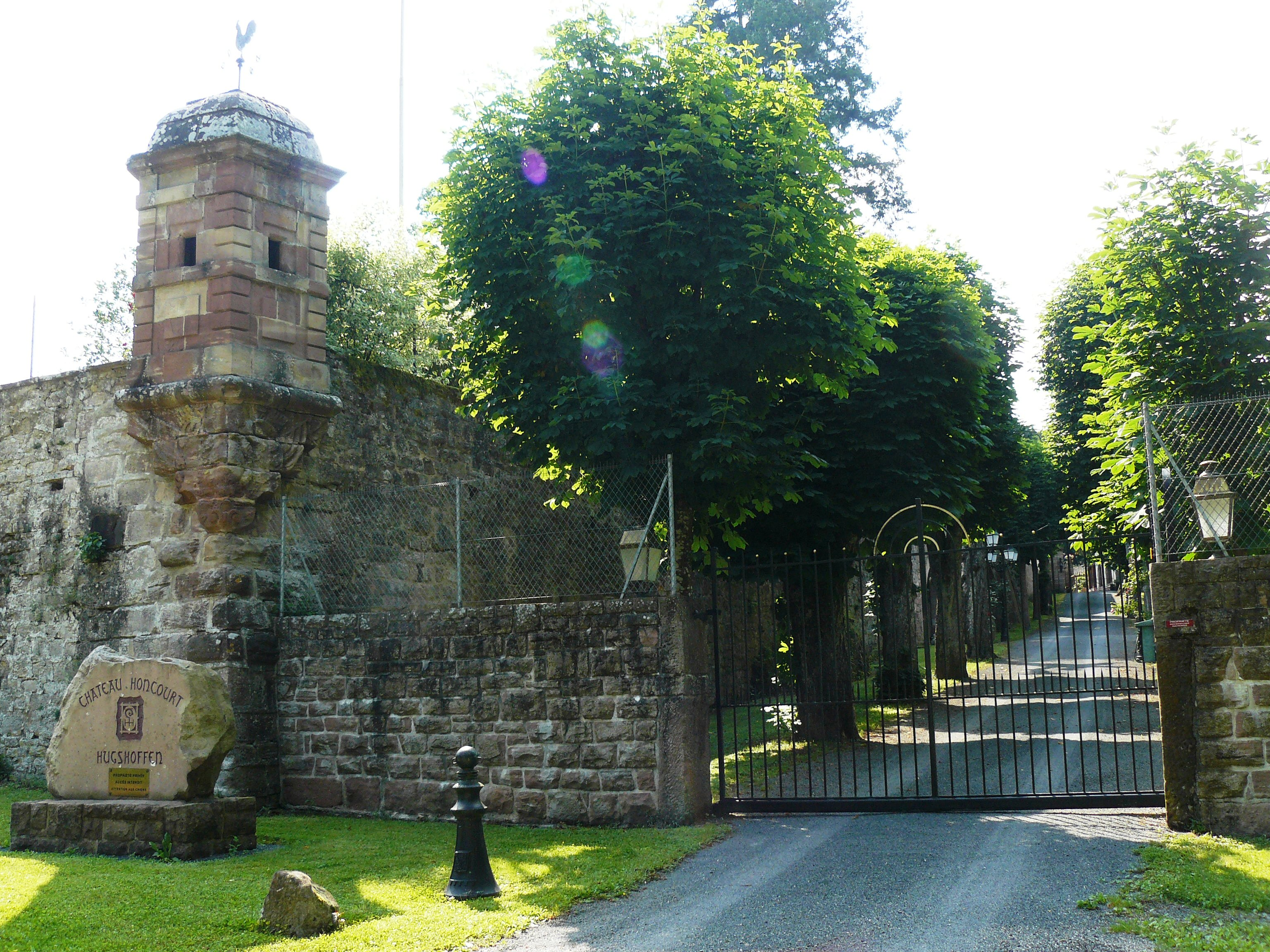
Entrance to Honcourt Abbey

Honcourt Abbey (French: Abbaye de Honcourt) or Hugshofen Abbey (German: Kloster Hugshofen) (Hugonis Curia in Latin) was a Benedictine abbey located near the village of Saint-Martin, Bas-Rhin, France, founded in the year 1000 and dissolved in or very shortly after 1525.

== History ==
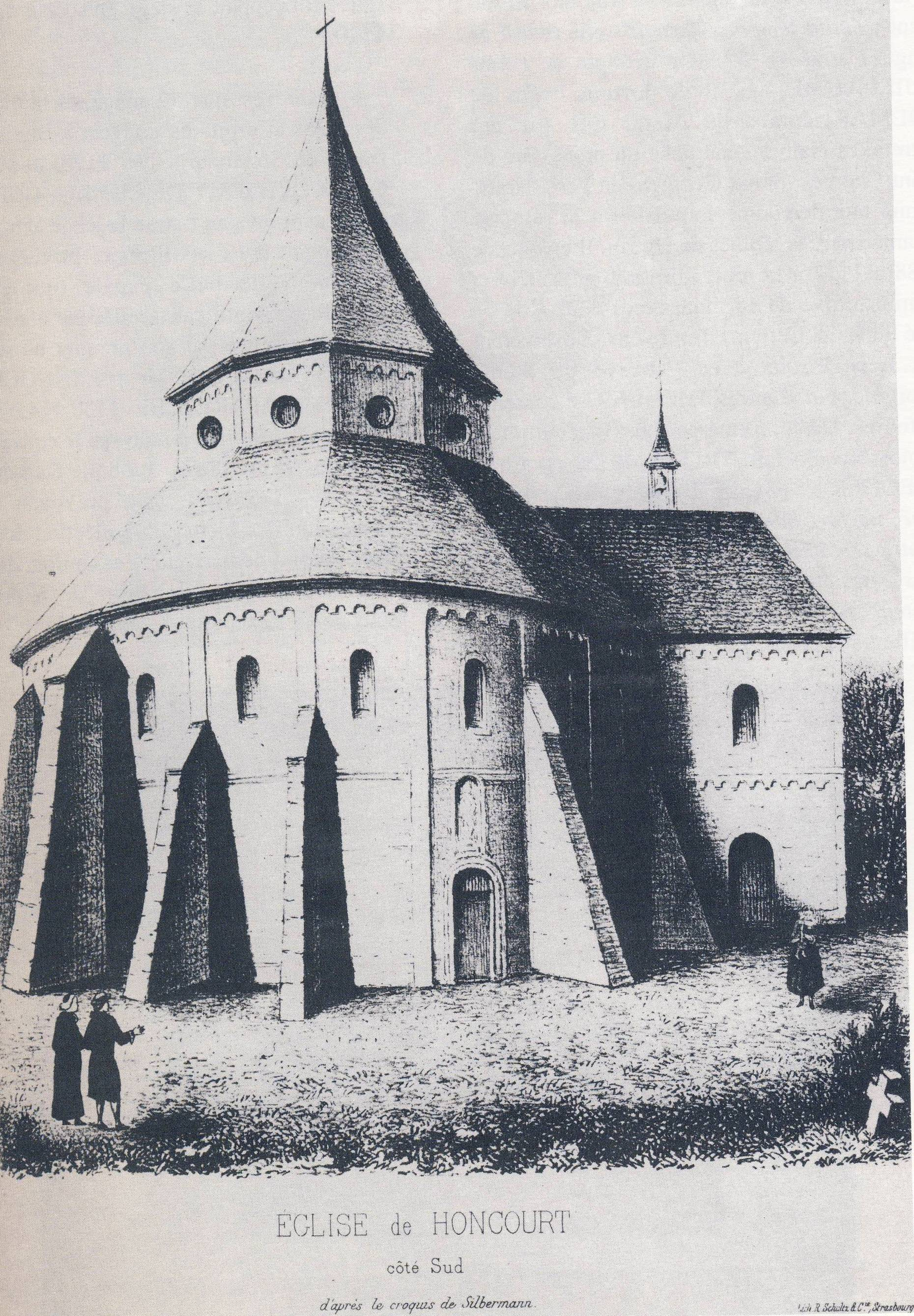
The rotunda of Honcourt Abbey church from the south (lithograph by A. Straub, 1856, after A. Silbermann)

The abbey was sited next to the Klosterwald ("monastery wood") in the village of Saint-Martin and was founded in 1000, in the reign of Emperor Otto III, by Count Werner of Ortenbourg, a descendant of the former ruling family of Alsace, the Etichonids, and of the family of the Eberhardines.

According to the 17th century history of Jean Ruyr, the monastery was built on the site of an earlier structure, a small castle or hunting lodge belonging to the eponymous Hugh or Hugo.

Werner and Hugo, who seem in fact to have been co-founders of the monastery, were brothers, sons of Albrecht, and both were buried in the abbey.

The abbey was endowed with estates throughout the Villé valley, particularly in Dieffenthal. Theoger, abbot of St. George's Abbey in the Black Forest from 1088 to 1119, introduced the Hirsau Reform, and this spiritual revival brought Honcourt a period of success.

In 1473–74 the abbey was occupied and sacked by the Burgundian troops of Charles the Bold, who entered the valley on 20 December 1473, occupied Villé and systematically ravaged the whole surrounding area.

In April 1525, during the Peasants' Revolt, the conventual buildings were sacked and burnt, destroying most of the abbey's contents, including the great majority of the library and archives. Those few documents that were saved, were incorporated into the archives of Andlau Abbey, all of which were destroyed during the French Revolution.

While the peasants were sacking the abbey, a particularly valuable retable, which seems certainly to have been a work of the sculptor Sixtus Schultheiss (d. 1527), was somehow transferred to the church of Villé, where Nicolas Volcyr de Serrouville, secretary to Antoine, Duke of Lorraine, took an interest in it. It was subsequently carried off by the Lotharingians along with a number of other sacred items rescued from the peasants, and its subsequent fate is unknown.

Shortly after the abbey was sacked and burnt, the monks dispersed. The last abbot, Paul Voltz, converted to Protestantism and took part in the Strasbourg reform.

In 1599 the remains of the abbey premises were sold by the Archdukes of Austria to Andlau Abbey. The transfer was confirmed by Pope Paul V in 1616. In 1782 the abbess of Andlau ordered the demolition of Honcourt, as its upkeep had become too expensive, and nothing now remains. The consequent architectural loss to the region was great, as the buildings were of high interest. Honcourt was a strategic point in the line of entry of Romanesque and Burgundian art into Alsace, between the churches of Saint-Dié and St. Faith of Sélestat.

== The abbey church ==
Construction of the abbey church began in 1186 and was finished a century later under abbot Conrad III in 1286. The church was an exceptional structure, circular, like the rotunda of Senones Abbey, adjoining a rectangular choir. The church too was demolished by the order of the abbess of Andlau in 1782. In its circular form, a great rarity, the abbey church strongly resembled the church of Ottmarsheim near Kembs, an outstanding example of primitive Romanesque architecture and a faithful replica, only smaller, of the Palatine Chapel in Aachen.

== Tradition of the founders ==
Both Werner and Hugo were, according to tradition, extraordinarily large men, and both were buried in the abbey. Their last descendant, Hugo, Count of Reichenberg (d. about 1361), also legendary for his exceptional height, was also buried here.

In 1516, the Emperor Maximilian I, while passing through Alsace, wished to satisfy his curiosity about the truth of the legend of the gigantic stature of Hugo of Reichenberg, and ordered the tomb to be opened. A femur was removed, from which it was proposed to calculate the overall length of the body on the ancient principle ex pede Herculem, basing the calculation on the assumption that a femur represents 1/8 of a man's overall height. The femur measured 32.48 centimetres (just over 1 foot), which when multiplied by 8 gave an extraordinary height of 259 centimetres, or 8½ feet, for Hugo. The diagram of the findings and calculations was preserved for many years at Sainte-Foy Priory in Sélestat. (Another curious discovery was that the bones of the co-founders Werner and Hugo were jumbled together).

In July 1986 three fragments of an inscribed pink stone slab were discovered at Saint-Martin. The date 1359 was decipherable, which may have been the actual date of death of Hugo (of which more is not known than that it occurred in about 1361). There are also arms which resemble those of the Reichenbergs. It is thus very possible that these are the remains of the tombstone of Hugo of Reichenberg.
