= Welche =

Alsatian dialect of Lorrain

- Welsche
- Native to: France
- Region: Bas-Rhin, Haut-Rhin
- Ethnicity: Welches
- Language family: Indo-European: Italic; Latino-Faliscan; Romance; Italo-Western; Western Romance; Gallo-Romance; Gallo-Rhaetian (possibly); Oïl; Lorrain; Welche
- Early forms: Old Latin: Vulgar Latin; Proto-Romance; Old Gallo-Romance; Old French

Language codes
- ISO 639-3: –
- Glottolog: None
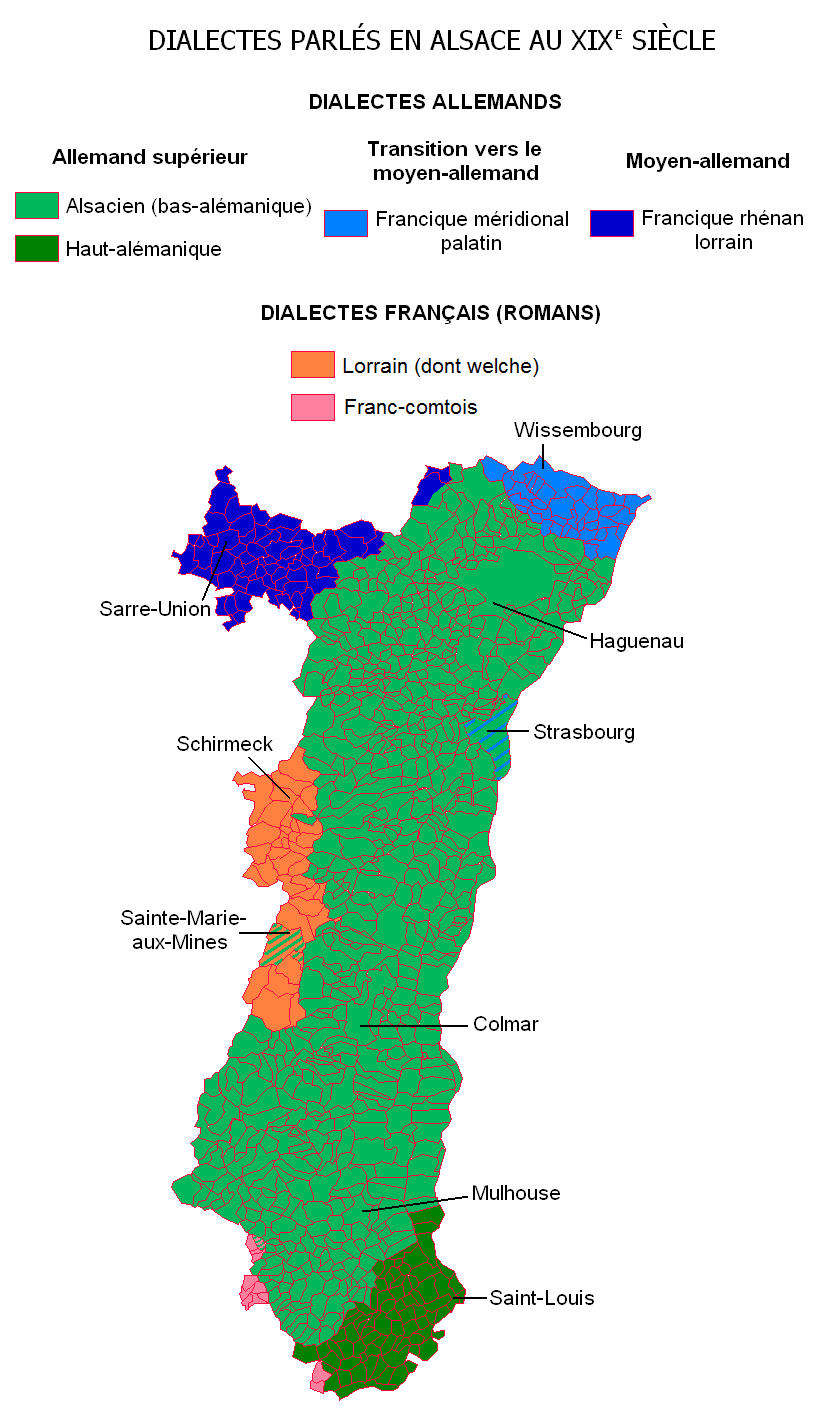
- Map of dialects in Alsace. Welche is shown with the Lorrain-speaking area (orange)

Welche is a Gallo-Romance dialect of Lorrain that is spoken in Alsace. It is closely related to French by the Oïl group. Its varieties include those of Bruche, Villé, Lièpvre, Kaysersberg and Orbey.

The dialect is spoken in the Welche country of Alsace that is west of Haut-Rhin, especially in the Arrondissement of Ribeauvillé and in the extreme southwest of Bas-Rhin.

== Etymology ==
The name Welche is a French spelling of Welsh and in German meant a "foreigner speaking a non-Germanic language". The word origins in French comes from Germanic languages such as English, used originally to refer to Celtic speakers, and later to Latin speakers after Latin was imposed on the Celts. The word Welsh was adopted in Latin dialects (such as French) to refer exclusively to other Latin dialects.

This word can have a pejorative connotation and shares the same etymology as Wales, Walcheren, Walloons, Walchengau, Walchensee, or Vlachs: the adjectival form of the West Germanic *Walhaz + the adjectival suffix -isk (-ish in English, -isch in German). The French words Gaul and Gaulois derive from the same Germanic etymon. The origin of the Germanic term walha appears to be the name of Celts of the Volcae, who came into contact with the Germanic tribes in southern Germany, before their departure for southern Gaul.

The Alemannic-speaking Alsatians used this term to refer to the Romance-speaking Alsatians who inhabited the high valleys of the Vosges Mountains. This word is used to name all Romance-speaking populations, whether in Alsace, Moselle, or to designate the French of the interior. It is also evident in the toponymy of Lorraine, with Welschoth / Audun-le-Roman contrasted with Tütschoth / Audun-le-Tiche, or the French Welschnied / Nied and the German Tütschnied / Nied. The term is attested as early as the 16th century among Alemannic-speaking scribes who used it to refer to the inhabitants of the Schirmeck region. This same word was introduced by Voltaire into literary French as a pejorative term for the French. Curiously, those concerned adopted the term to refer to themselves, as did, at the other end of France, in the Southwest, the Gavaches of northern Gironde (Pays Gabay or Grande Gavacherie) and of Entre-deux-Mers (Petite Gavacherie or Gavacherie de Monségur), people of Langues d'oïl whom their Gascon neighbors had nicknamed "Gabais" or "Gavaches", that is to say, more or less "savages".

Around 1862, in Strasbourg itself, the common people still referred to the French from the interior as Welches. This name was also used at the same time by some Alsatian mountain people to refer to the Lorrainers in an insulting way.

== Variations ==
The Linguasphere Observatory distinguishes five variants:

- upper Bruche valley (Bas-Rhin)
- Val de Villé (Bas-Rhin)
- Lièpvre valley (Haut-Rhin)
- Kaysersberg valley (Haut-Rhin)
- Orbey valley (Haut-Rhin)

== History ==
The valleys of the Welche region have likely been inhabited for a very long time and do not all share the same history. However, three successive waves of Romance population arrivals can be considered possible :

Gallo-Roman tribes from the Alsatian plain are thought to have fled the Germanic invasions in the 3rd and 4th centuries to swell the ranks of the older settlements in these valleys. Romance place names dating from the Carolingian period support this hypothesis, but archaeological evidence is non-existent (with the exception of the Gallo-Roman foundries of Saâles).

Lorraine monasteries and abbeys owning land on the Alsatian side may have incorporated into this Romance community peasants from Lorraine speaking a Romance dialect. These possessions are attested from the 8th century onwards.

Alsace was conquered by Louis XIV following the Peace of Westphalia (1648) and Treaties of Nijmegen. To achieve this, he allied himself with the Swedes, who withdrew in 1635, leaving the territory to the French. However, Alsace (like Lorraine) was traversed by a multitude of troops who pillaged and attacked villages and towns. The population was scattered and succumbed to malnutrition: it lost 66% of its numbers from the north to the south of the province, with nearly 80% of the losses in the Sundgau region. Allied troops and Imperial forces plundered the vineyard regions and the "important" valleys. That is to say, with a castle or convent and priory: thus, from north to south, the valleys of Sainte-Marie-aux-Mines (castle and priory), Kaysersberg (Pairis convent in Orbey), and the valley further south (Muhlbach) were 100% destroyed. Although no convent buildings were located in the Bruche valley, it lost four-fifths of its population. The valleys of the Welche region would "preserve" their Romance dialect, primarily thanks to the survivors, and also through a very limited influx of Vosges residents from the region of Gérardmer, Cornimont, and Saint-Dié, insofar as these latter had permission from their lords to leave their lands (themselves greatly impoverished) for others. Another, more distant population appeared in the Vosges valleys from the early 1650s onwards, speaking Alemannic and practicing the Reformed religion: the Swiss from the canton of Bern. Around 1700, a group of Catholic miners and metalworkers from Austria also arrived, also speaking Alemannic.

The visible consequences at the end of the 17th century were therefore those of a stronger vitality for the Alsatian populations of the foothills which eliminated the Welche presence in Urmatt and Grendelbruch and which pushed back — for example — the linguistic boundary further up the Bruche valley to Natzwiller.

Thus, even today, village names remain Romance (Lapoutroie, Fréland, Orbey, Haute-Goutte, Belmont, Fouday, etc.) contrasting with the neighbouring communes of Kaysersberg, Alspach, Ammerschwihr, etc. or Lutzelhouse, Russ, Hersbach, Schirmeck, Wildersbach, Waldersbach, which are nevertheless historically Romance-speaking.

Similarly, family names of Vosges origin: Petitdemange, Didierjean, Batot (which are found in the Vosges department) contrast with the Muller, Meyer and other Schmidt of the plain, etc. but the Holveck, Grosheins, Hazemann of Ban de la Roche remain of Lorraine dialect.

== Status ==
Various initiatives are trying to keep this dialect alive. For example, the hamlet of Tannach has put on a comedy show in this language. In the Bas-Rhin department, in Neuviller-la-Roche and Steige, as well as in the Haut-Rhin department, in the Val d'Orbey, "dialect table" gatherings are regularly organized.

In 1999, musician Rodolphe Burger and writer Olivier Cadiot published the musical album On n'est pas des indiens c'est dommage, from a performance dedicated to the Welche language.

In Switzerland, Welsch is the nickname familiarly given by German-speaking Swiss to French-speaking Swiss.

In Alsace, the Pays Welche region comprises five communes in the Canton of Lapoutroie : Fréland, Le Bonhomme, Orbey, Lapoutroie, and Labaroche. The Welche dialect is still commonly spoken there. The Musée du Pays Welche (Museum of the Pays Welche) recounts the history and customs of its inhabitants. The Société d’Histoire du Canton de Lapoutroie - Val d’Orbey (Historical Society of the Canton of Lapoutroie - Val d'Orbey) publishes a range of works and a French/Welche dictionary.

== Lexical comparison ==
English	Latin	French	Welche	Alsatian	German
Key	Clavis	Clef / Clé	Kyè	Schlìssel	Schlüssel
Sing	Cantāre	Chanter	Tchantè	Singe	Singen
Goat	Capra	Chèvre	Tchiv	Geiss	Ziege
Language	Lingua	Langue	Longk	Sproch	Sprache
Night	Nox, Noctis	Nuit	Ney	Nacht	Nacht
Soap	Sapo, Saponis	Savon	Savo	Sääf	Seife
Sweat	Sudāre	Suer	Souè	Schwitze	Schwitzen
Life	Vīta	Vie	Vi	Läwe	Leben
Pay	Pācāre	Payer	Pèyi	Zahhle	Zahlen
Place	Platea	Place	Pyès	Plàtz	Platz
Church	Ecclēsia (Monasterium)	Église	Motéy	Kìrch	Kirche
Cheese	Caseus (Formaticus)	Fromage	Fermèdj	Kääs	Käse

== See also ==
- Language policy of France
- Names related to the word Welche
