= Stotzheim =

- Commune
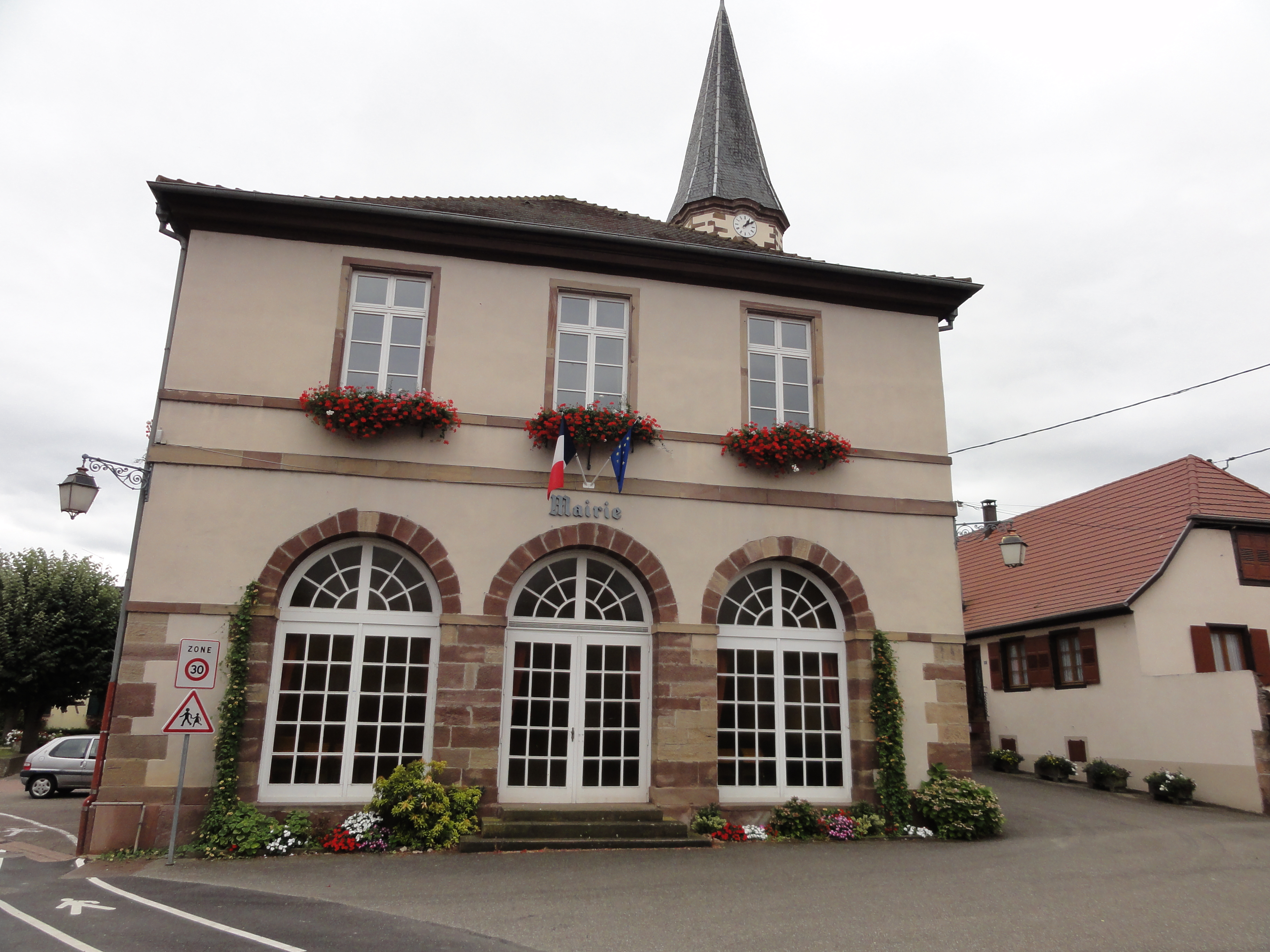
- The town hall in Stotzheim

- Coat of arms
- Location of Stotzheim
- Location within France Location within Grand Est
- Coordinates: 48°22′49″N 7°29′32″E
- Country: France
- Region: Grand Est
- Department: Bas-Rhin
- Arrondissement: Sélestat-Erstein
- Canton: Obernai

Government
  - Mayor (2020–2026): Jean-Marie Koenig
- Area^{1}: 13.61 km^{2} (5.25 sq mi)
- Highest elevation: 189 m (620 ft)
- Lowest elevation: 155 m (509 ft)
- Population (2023): 1,121
  - Density: 82.37/km^{2} (213.3/sq mi)
- Time zone: UTC+01:00 (CET)
  - Summer (DST): UTC+02:00 (CEST)
- INSEE/Postal code: 67481 /67140
- ^{1} French Land Register data, which excludes lakes, ponds, glaciers > 1 km^{2} (0.386 sq mi or 247 acres) and river estuaries.

Stotzheim (French pronunciation: [ʃtɔtsaim]) is a commune in the Bas-Rhin department in Alsace in north-eastern France.

== See also ==
- Communes of the Bas-Rhin department
