= Château du Frankenbourg =

Ruined 12th-century castle in Alsace, France

Coordinates: 48°17′43″N 7°19′30″E

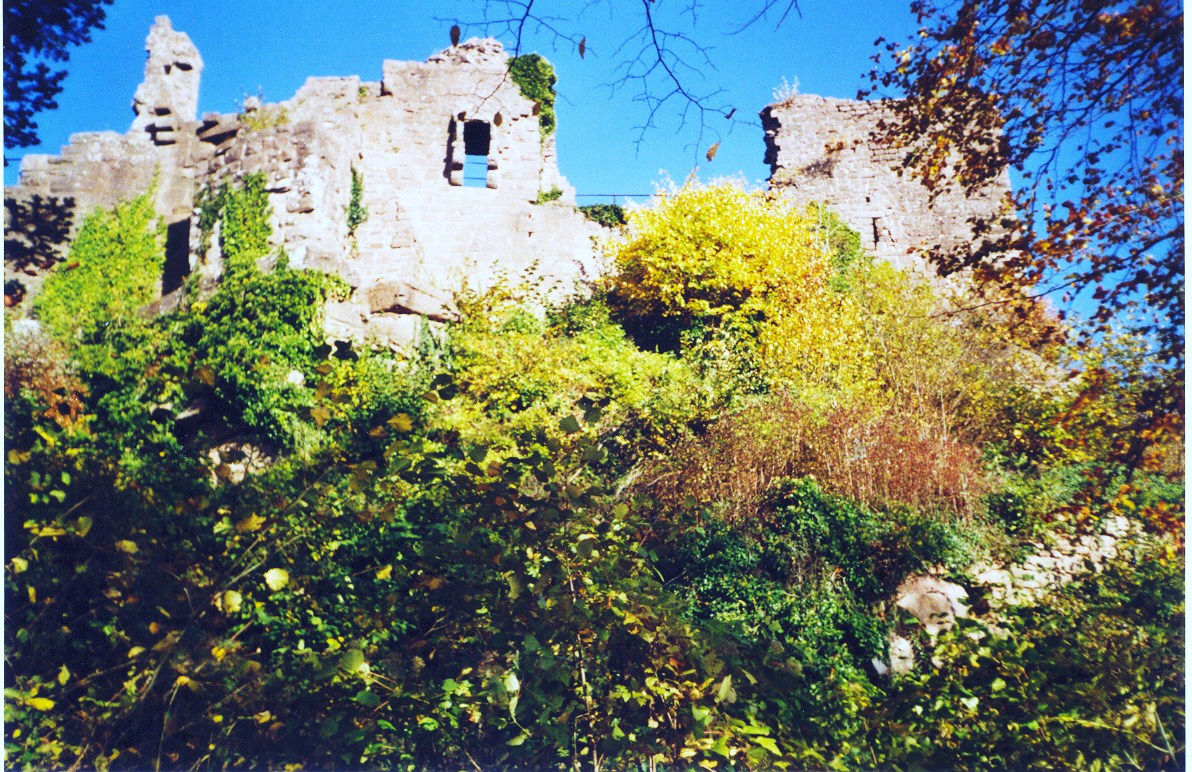

The Château de Frankenbourg is a ruined 12th century castle in the commune of Neubois in the Bas-Rhin département in Alsace, France.

The castle is state-owned. It has been listed since 1898 as a monument historique by the French Ministry of Culture.

== See also ==
- List of castles in France
- Chateau
