= Neuve-Église =

- Commune
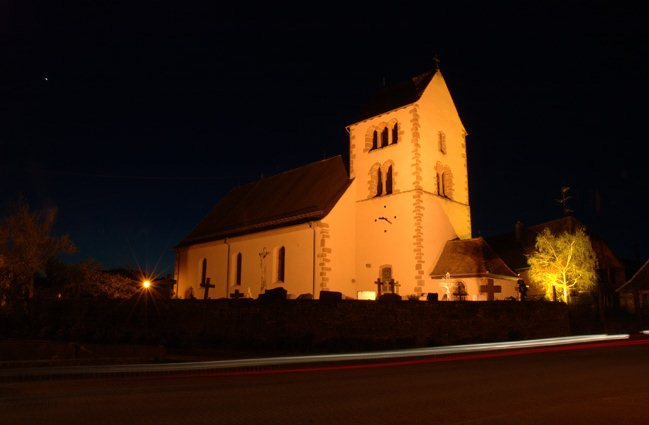
- Saint-Nicolas church

- Coat of arms
- Location of Neuve-Église
- Location within France Location within Grand Est
- Coordinates: 48°19′48″N 7°18′52″E
- Country: France
- Region: Grand Est
- Department: Bas-Rhin
- Arrondissement: Sélestat-Erstein
- Canton: Mutzig
- Intercommunality: Vallée de Villé

Government
  - Mayor (2020–2026): Alexandre Krauth
- Area^{1}: 5.48 km^{2} (2.12 sq mi)
- Highest elevation: 660 m (2,170 ft)
- Lowest elevation: 237 m (778 ft)
- Population (2023): 613
  - Density: 112/km^{2} (290/sq mi)
- Time zone: UTC+01:00 (CET)
  - Summer (DST): UTC+02:00 (CEST)
- INSEE/Postal code: 67320 /67220
- ^{1} French Land Register data, which excludes lakes, ponds, glaciers > 1 km^{2} (0.386 sq mi or 247 acres) and river estuaries.

Neuve-Église (French pronunciation: [nœv eɡliz]; German: Neukirch) is a commune in the Bas-Rhin department in Alsace in north-eastern France.

== See also ==
- Communes of the Bas-Rhin department
