= Saint-Martin, Bas-Rhin =

Saint-Martin
- Commune
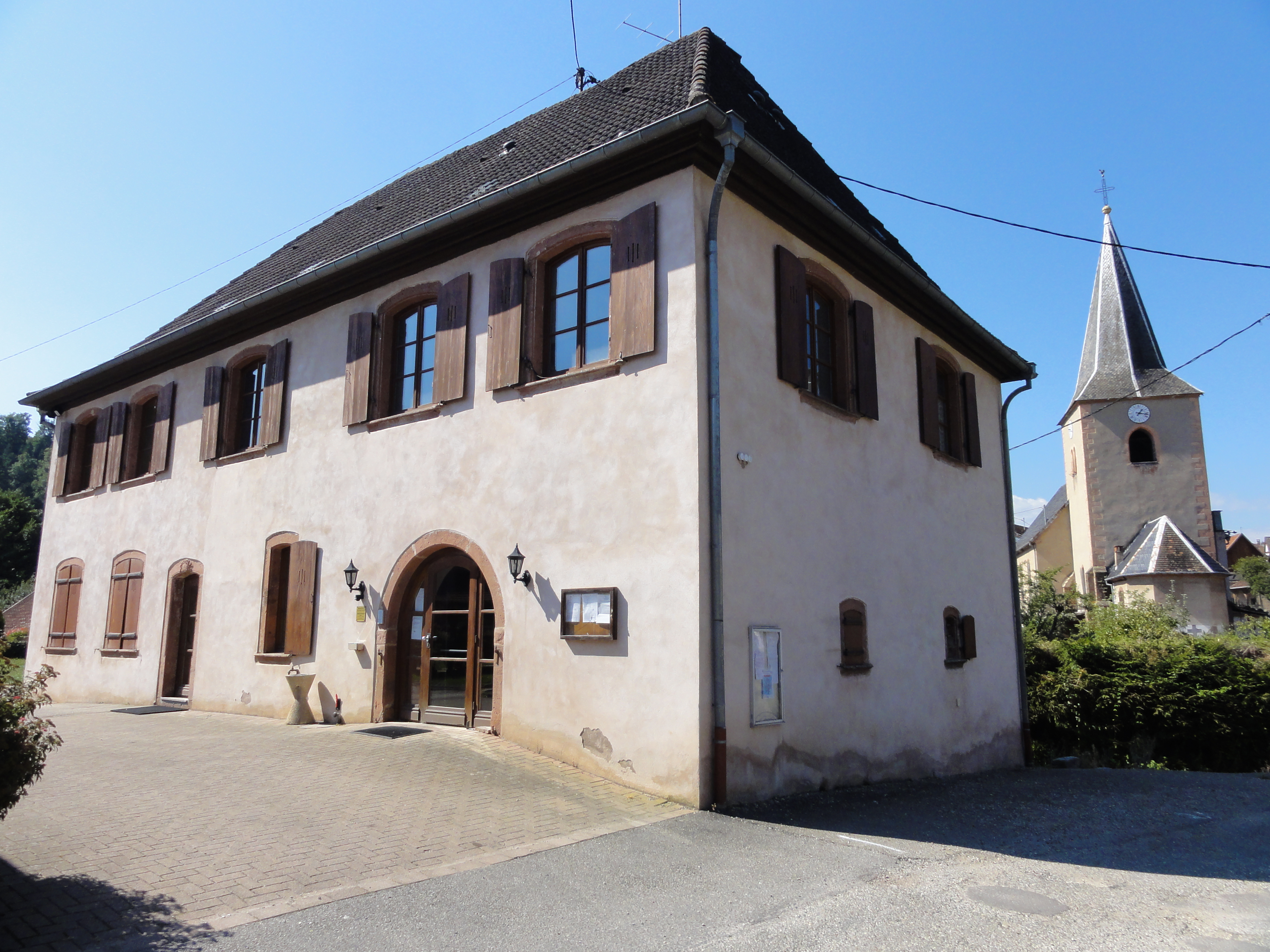
- The town hall in Saint-Martin

- Coat of arms
- Location of Saint-Martin
- Location within France Location within Grand Est
- Coordinates: 48°21′05″N 7°17′26″E
- Country: France
- Region: Grand Est
- Department: Bas-Rhin
- Arrondissement: Sélestat-Erstein
- Canton: Mutzig
- Intercommunality: Vallée de Villé

Government
  - Mayor (2020–2026): André Muller
- Area^{1}: 3.97 km^{2} (1.53 sq mi)
- Highest elevation: 615 m (2,018 ft)
- Lowest elevation: 268 m (879 ft)
- Population (2023): 374
  - Density: 94.2/km^{2} (244/sq mi)
- Time zone: UTC+01:00 (CET)
  - Summer (DST): UTC+02:00 (CEST)
- INSEE/Postal code: 67426 /67220
- ^{1} French Land Register data, which excludes lakes, ponds, glaciers > 1 km^{2} (0.386 sq mi or 247 acres) and river estuaries.

Saint-Martin (French pronunciation: [sɛ̃ maʁtɛ̃]; German: Sankt Martin) is a commune in the Bas-Rhin department in Alsace in north-eastern France.

== See also ==
- Communes of the Bas-Rhin department
