= Steige =

- Commune
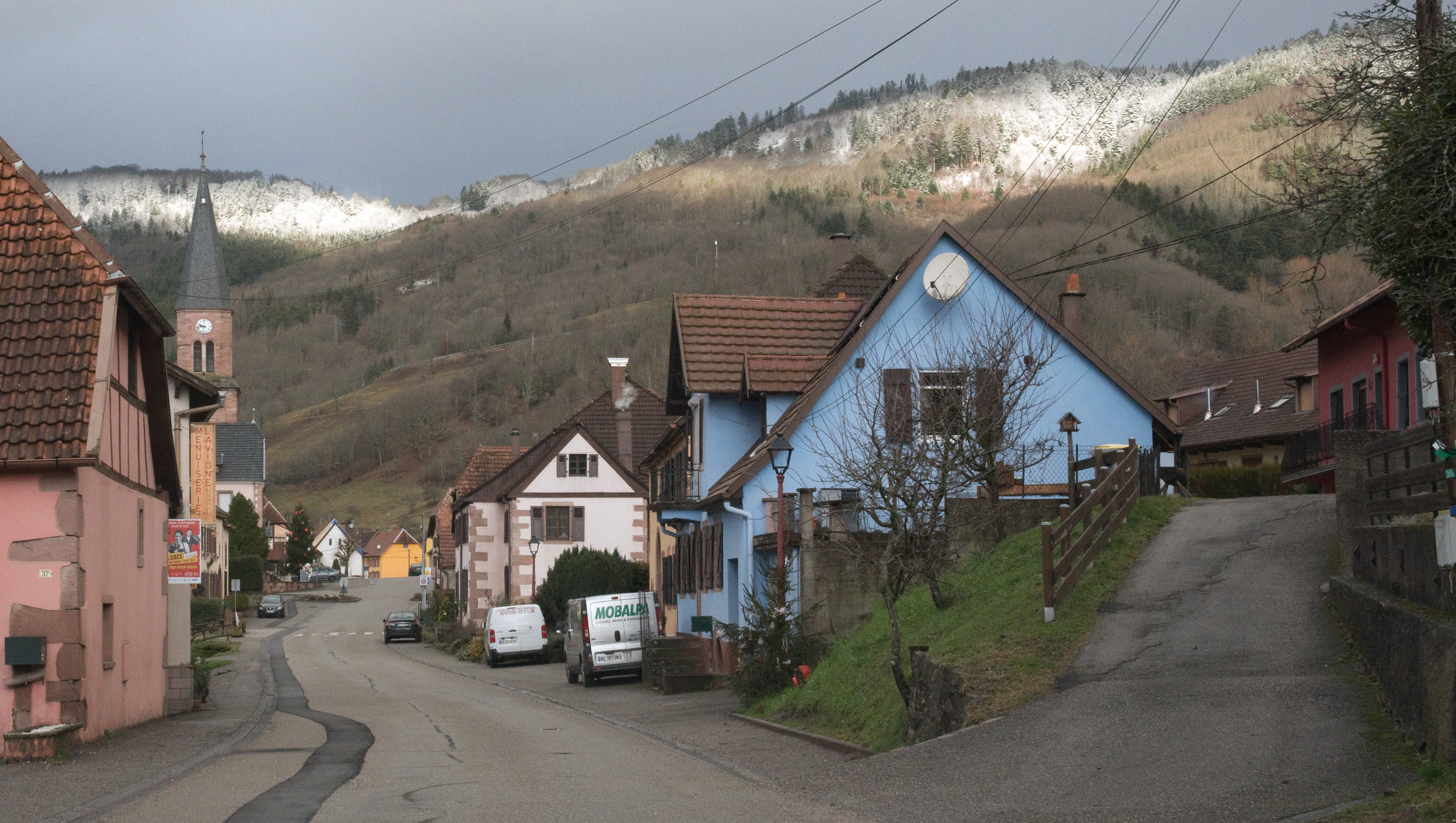
- Village view in winter

- Coat of arms
- Location of Steige
- Location within France Location within Grand Est
- Coordinates: 48°21′42″N 7°14′22″E
- Country: France
- Region: Grand Est
- Department: Bas-Rhin
- Arrondissement: Sélestat-Erstein
- Canton: Mutzig

Government
  - Mayor (2020–2026): Monique Houlné
- Area^{1}: 9.86 km^{2} (3.81 sq mi)
- Highest elevation: 1,020 m (3,350 ft)
- Lowest elevation: 317 m (1,040 ft)
- Population (2023): 623
  - Density: 63.2/km^{2} (164/sq mi)
- Time zone: UTC+01:00 (CET)
  - Summer (DST): UTC+02:00 (CEST)
- INSEE/Postal code: 67477 /67220
- ^{1} French Land Register data, which excludes lakes, ponds, glaciers > 1 km^{2} (0.386 sq mi or 247 acres) and river estuaries.

Steige (French pronunciation: [stɛʒ]) is a commune in the Bas-Rhin department in Alsace in north-eastern France.

== See also ==
- Communes of the Bas-Rhin department
