= Villé =

- Commune
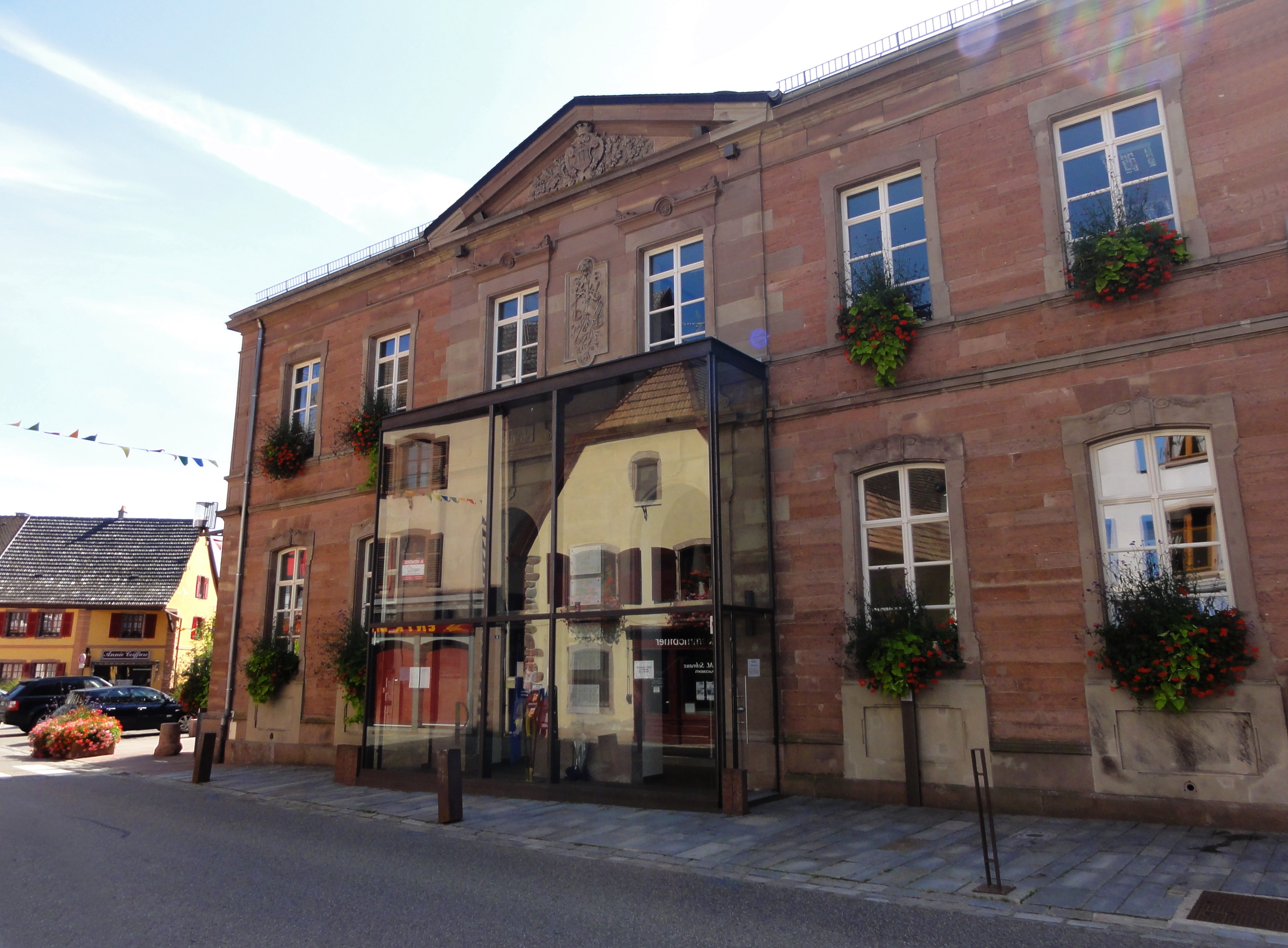
- The town hall in Villé

- Coat of arms
- Location of Villé
- Location within France Location within Grand Est
- Coordinates: 48°20′40″N 7°18′17″E
- Country: France
- Region: Grand Est
- Department: Bas-Rhin
- Arrondissement: Sélestat-Erstein
- Canton: Mutzig
- Intercommunality: Vallée de Villé

Government
  - Mayor (2020–2026): Lionel Pfann
- Area^{1}: 2.84 km^{2} (1.10 sq mi)
- Elevation: 260 m (850 ft)
- Highest elevation: 470 m (1,540 ft)
- Lowest elevation: 253 m (830 ft)
- Population (2023): 1,799
  - Density: 633/km^{2} (1,640/sq mi)
- Time zone: UTC+01:00 (CET)
  - Summer (DST): UTC+02:00 (CEST)
- INSEE/Postal code: 67507 /67220
- ^{1} French Land Register data, which excludes lakes, ponds, glaciers > 1 km^{2} (0.386 sq mi or 247 acres) and river estuaries.

Villé (French pronunciation: [vile]; German: Weiler) is a commune in the Bas-Rhin department and Grand Est region of north-eastern France.

== Climate ==
On average, Villé experiences 67.6 days per year with a minimum temperature below 0 °C (32.0 °F), 3.3 days per year with a minimum temperature below −10 °C (14.0 °F), 9.0 days per year with a maximum temperature below 0 °C (32.0 °F), and 2.8 days per year with a maximum temperature above 30 °C (86.0 °F). The record high temperature was 41.2 °C (106.2 °F) on 27 June 2026, while the record low temperature was −19.0 °C (−2.2 °F) on 7 February 1991.

Climate data for Villé (1991–2020 normals, extremes 1990–present)
Month	Jan	Feb	Mar	Apr	May	Jun	Jul	Aug	Sep	Oct	Nov	Dec	Year
Record high °C (°F)	18.4 (65.1)	22.1 (71.8)	26.5 (79.7)	30.0 (86.0)	35.2 (95.4)	41.2 (106.2)	39.7 (103.5)	39.5 (103.1)	34.4 (93.9)	29.6 (85.3)	23.6 (74.5)	18.3 (64.9)	41.2 (106.2)
Mean daily maximum °C (°F)	5.8 (42.4)	7.3 (45.1)	12.3 (54.1)	17.1 (62.8)	21.1 (70.0)	25.0 (77.0)	26.7 (80.1)	26.3 (79.3)	21.8 (71.2)	15.8 (60.4)	9.6 (49.3)	6.3 (43.3)	16.3 (61.2)
Daily mean °C (°F)	2.7 (36.9)	3.3 (37.9)	7.1 (44.8)	11.0 (51.8)	15.0 (59.0)	18.7 (65.7)	20.4 (68.7)	20.0 (68.0)	16.0 (60.8)	11.3 (52.3)	6.2 (43.2)	3.3 (37.9)	11.3 (52.3)
Mean daily minimum °C (°F)	−0.4 (31.3)	−0.6 (30.9)	2.0 (35.6)	4.9 (40.8)	9.0 (48.2)	12.5 (54.5)	14.1 (57.4)	13.6 (56.5)	10.2 (50.4)	6.8 (44.2)	2.8 (37.0)	0.3 (32.5)	6.3 (43.3)
Record low °C (°F)	−14.5 (5.9)	−19.0 (−2.2)	−14.8 (5.4)	−6.5 (20.3)	−0.5 (31.1)	1.5 (34.7)	4.0 (39.2)	3.5 (38.3)	0.0 (32.0)	−4.6 (23.7)	−11.7 (10.9)	−18.7 (−1.7)	−19.0 (−2.2)
Average precipitation mm (inches)	91.4 (3.60)	80.6 (3.17)	78.8 (3.10)	57.6 (2.27)	84.1 (3.31)	78.1 (3.07)	74.6 (2.94)	69.0 (2.72)	61.5 (2.42)	87.6 (3.45)	86.8 (3.42)	107.6 (4.24)	957.7 (37.71)
Average precipitation days (≥ 1.0 mm)	12.2	11.0	10.5	10.0	12.3	10.0	11.5	10.3	8.6	11.4	12.5	14.1	134.4
Source: Meteociel

== See also ==
- Communes of the Bas-Rhin department
