= Kirrberg =

Kirrberg may refer to:

- Kirrberg (Saar), a district of Homburg, Saarland, Germany
- Kirrberg, Bas-Rhin, a commune in the Bas-Rhin department in France
