= Thal-Drulingen =

- Commune
- Coat of arms
- Location of Thal-Drulingen
- Location within France Location within Grand Est
- Coordinates: 48°54′39″N 7°08′47″E
- Country: France
- Region: Grand Est
- Department: Bas-Rhin
- Arrondissement: Saverne
- Canton: Ingwiller

Government
  - Mayor (2020–2026): Frédy Bach
- Area^{1}: 5.25 km^{2} (2.03 sq mi)
- Highest elevation: 357 m (1,171 ft)
- Lowest elevation: 241 m (791 ft)
- Population (2023): 186
  - Density: 35.4/km^{2} (91.8/sq mi)
- Time zone: UTC+01:00 (CET)
  - Summer (DST): UTC+02:00 (CEST)
- INSEE/Postal code: 67488 /67320
- ^{1} French Land Register data, which excludes lakes, ponds, glaciers > 1 km^{2} (0.386 sq mi or 247 acres) and river estuaries.

Thal-Drulingen (French pronunciation: [tal dʁyliŋ(ɡ)ən]; German: Thal bei Drulingen) is a commune in the Bas-Rhin department in Grand Est in north-eastern France.

== See also ==
- Communes of the Bas-Rhin department
