= Wolfskirchen =

- Commune
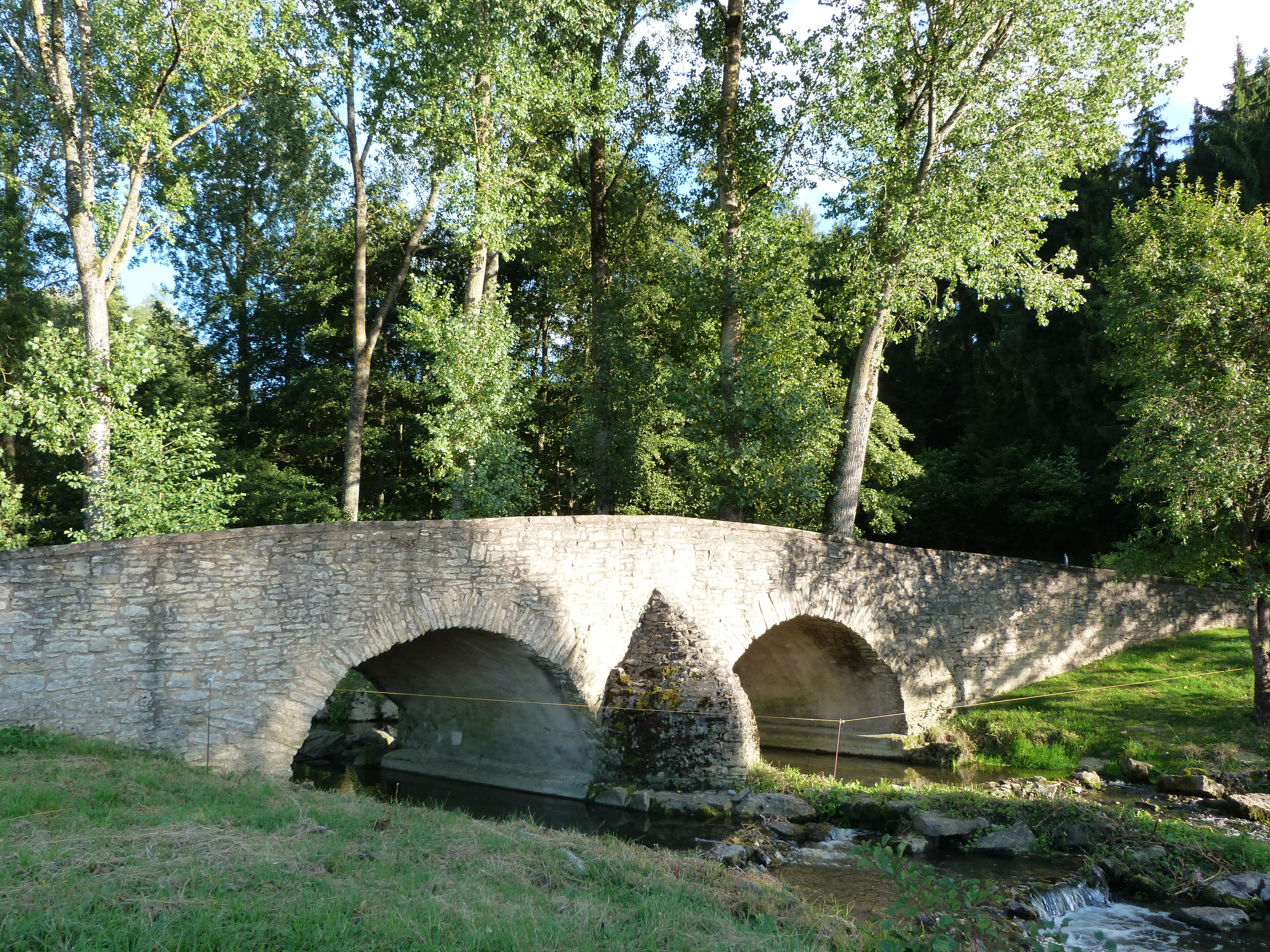
- The Isch bridge in Wolfskirchen

- Coat of arms
- Location of Wolfskirchen
- Location within France Location within Grand Est
- Coordinates: 48°52′50″N 7°04′30″E
- Country: France
- Region: Grand Est
- Department: Bas-Rhin
- Arrondissement: Saverne
- Canton: Ingwiller
- Intercommunality: Alsace Bossue

Government
  - Mayor (2024–2026): Annick Strackar
- Area^{1}: 10.48 km^{2} (4.05 sq mi)
- Elevation: 275 m (902 ft)
- Highest elevation: 355 m (1,165 ft)
- Lowest elevation: 222 m (728 ft)
- Population (2023): 332
  - Density: 31.7/km^{2} (82.0/sq mi)
- Time zone: UTC+01:00 (CET)
  - Summer (DST): UTC+02:00 (CEST)
- INSEE/Postal code: 67552 /67260
- ^{1} French Land Register data, which excludes lakes, ponds, glaciers > 1 km^{2} (0.386 sq mi or 247 acres) and river estuaries.

Wolfskirchen (French pronunciation: [vɔlfskiʁʃən]) is a commune in the Bas-Rhin department in Grand Est in north-eastern France.

== Population ==
Historical population
Year	Pop.	±% p.a.
1968	408	—
1975	401	−0.25%
1982	359	−1.57%
1990	312	−1.74%
1999	335	+0.79%
2007	352	+0.62%
2012	355	+0.17%
2017	344	−0.63%
2023	332	−0.59%
Source: INSEE

== See also ==
- Communes of the Bas-Rhin department
