= Pfalzweyer =

- Commune
- Coat of arms
- Location of Pfalzweyer
- Location within France Location within Grand Est
- Coordinates: 48°48′18″N 7°15′30″E
- Country: France
- Region: Grand Est
- Department: Bas-Rhin
- Arrondissement: Saverne
- Canton: Ingwiller
- Intercommunality: CC Hanau-La Petite Pierre

Government
  - Mayor (2020–2026): Daniel Holzscherer
- Area^{1}: 2.23 km^{2} (0.86 sq mi)
- Highest elevation: 322 m (1,056 ft)
- Lowest elevation: 240 m (790 ft)
- Population (2023): 329
  - Density: 148/km^{2} (382/sq mi)
- Time zone: UTC+01:00 (CET)
  - Summer (DST): UTC+02:00 (CEST)
- INSEE/Postal code: 67373 /67320
- ^{1} French Land Register data, which excludes lakes, ponds, glaciers > 1 km^{2} (0.386 sq mi or 247 acres) and river estuaries.

Pfalzweyer is a commune in the Bas-Rhin department and Grand Est region of north-eastern France.

== Population ==
Historical population
Year	Pop.	±% p.a.
1968	309	—
1975	307	−0.09%
1982	288	−0.91%
1990	307	+0.80%
1999	309	+0.07%
2007	292	−0.70%
2012	321	+1.91%
2017	321	+0.00%
2023	329	+0.41%
Source: INSEE

== See also ==
- Communes of the Bas-Rhin department
