= Hinsingen =

Hinsingen Hinsínge
- Commune
- Coat of arms
- Location of Hinsingen
- Location within France Location within Grand Est
- Coordinates: 48°57′12″N 6°59′33″E
- Country: France
- Region: Grand Est
- Department: Bas-Rhin
- Arrondissement: Saverne
- Canton: Ingwiller

Government
  - Mayor (2020–2026): Frédéric Bellott
- Area^{1}: 2.98 km^{2} (1.15 sq mi)
- Highest elevation: 251 m (823 ft)
- Lowest elevation: 212 m (696 ft)
- Population (2023): 78
  - Density: 26/km^{2} (68/sq mi)
- Time zone: UTC+01:00 (CET)
  - Summer (DST): UTC+02:00 (CEST)
- INSEE/Postal code: 67199 /67260
- ^{1} French Land Register data, which excludes lakes, ponds, glaciers > 1 km^{2} (0.386 sq mi or 247 acres) and river estuaries.

Hinsingen (French pronunciation: [insiŋ(ɡ)ən]) is a commune in the north-western corner of the Bas-Rhin department in Grand Est in north-eastern France.

== History ==
The place is first recorded in 1328 as "Heyngesingen": at that time it was in Saarwerden County. Originally the little village clustered around its castle was positioned in the valley, but it was destroyed in the Thirty Years War. Hinsingen is on the frontier between Alsace and Lorraine: following further sustained destruction wrought by the interminable wars fought between France and The Empire in the final decades of the seventeenth century, remaining villagers removed the settlement to its present hilltop location.

The name of the village has mutated over time through "Hinquezange" to "Hinsingen".

== See also ==
- Communes of the Bas-Rhin department
