= Oermingen =

Oermingen Ermìnge
- Commune
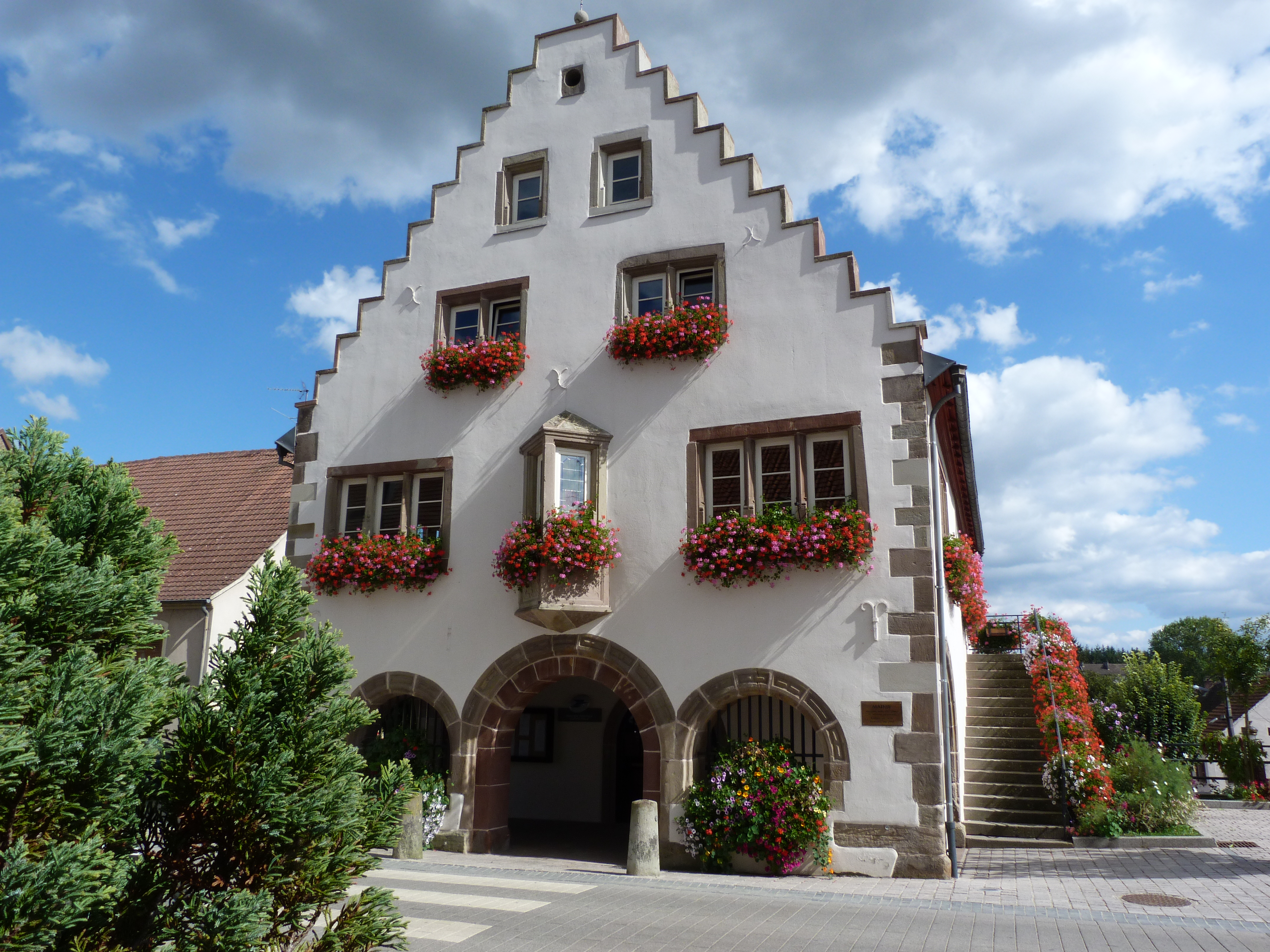
- The town hall in Oermingen

- Coat of arms
- Location of Oermingen
- Location within France Location within Grand Est
- Coordinates: 48°59′59″N 7°07′46″E
- Country: France
- Region: Grand Est
- Department: Bas-Rhin
- Arrondissement: Saverne
- Canton: Ingwiller

Government
  - Mayor (2020–2026): Simon Schmidt
- Area^{1}: 14.63 km^{2} (5.65 sq mi)
- Highest elevation: 324 m (1,063 ft)
- Lowest elevation: 207 m (679 ft)
- Population (2023): 1,086
  - Density: 74.23/km^{2} (192.3/sq mi)
- Time zone: UTC+01:00 (CET)
  - Summer (DST): UTC+02:00 (CEST)
- INSEE/Postal code: 67355 /67970
- ^{1} French Land Register data, which excludes lakes, ponds, glaciers > 1 km^{2} (0.386 sq mi or 247 acres) and river estuaries.

Oermingen (French pronunciation: [œʁmiŋ(ɡ)ən]; German: Örmingen) is a commune in the Bas-Rhin department in Grand Est in northeastern France.

== See also ==
- Communes of the Bas-Rhin department
