= Erckartswiller =

- Commune
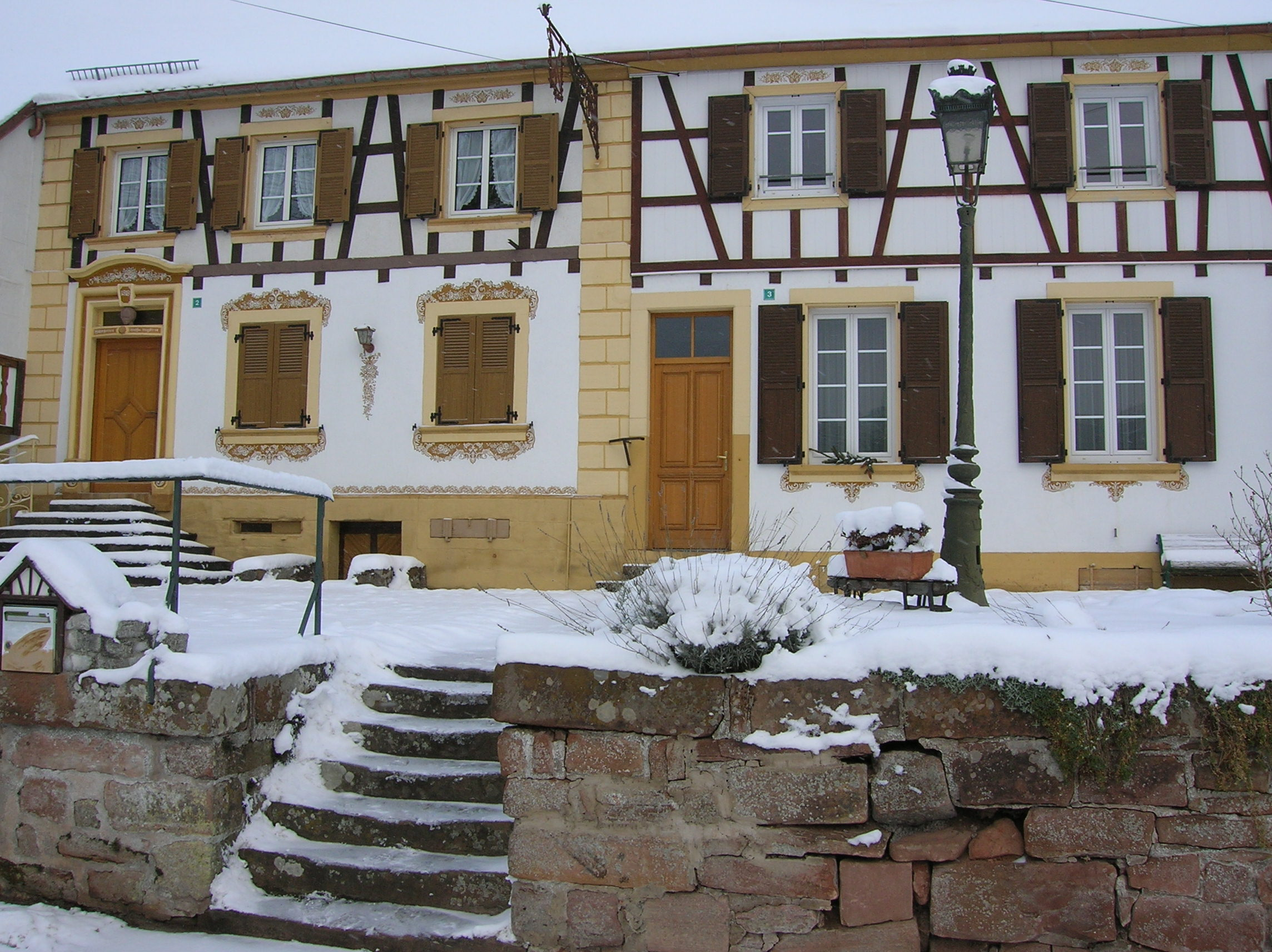
- Houses in Erckartswiller

- Coat of arms
- Location of Erckartswiller
- Location within France Location within Grand Est
- Coordinates: 48°52′37″N 7°22′07″E
- Country: France
- Region: Grand Est
- Department: Bas-Rhin
- Arrondissement: Saverne
- Canton: Ingwiller

Government
  - Mayor (2020–2026): Jean Adam
- Area^{1}: 10.46 km^{2} (4.04 sq mi)
- Highest elevation: 392 m (1,286 ft)
- Lowest elevation: 217 m (712 ft)
- Population (2023): 285
  - Density: 27.2/km^{2} (70.6/sq mi)
- Time zone: UTC+01:00 (CET)
  - Summer (DST): UTC+02:00 (CEST)
- INSEE/Postal code: 67126 /67290
- ^{1} French Land Register data, which excludes lakes, ponds, glaciers > 1 km^{2} (0.386 sq mi or 247 acres) and river estuaries.

Erckartswiller (German: Erkartsweiler) is a commune, in the Bas-Rhin department in Grand Est in north-eastern France. It is part of the arrondissement of Saverne and the canton of Ingwiller.

== History ==
In 1176, the Holy Roman Emperor donated the Ekengeriswilre monastic grange (Note: The term used by the source is "la grangia Ekengeriswilre". Grangia cannot be found in any French dictionary, but it is used in Italian for the English term monastic grange. This also matches the context of the source (translated): "In 1176, Pope Alexander III acknowledged the possession of the Ekengeriswilre [monastic grange] to the cistern abbey of Neubourg, which was undoubtedly received as a donation by the emperor." (The village was within the Holy Roman Empire at the time.)) to Neubourg Abbey in nearby Dauendorf. The fiefdom of Erkartswyler was sold by the Burn family to the lord of Lichtenberg in 1345. Following the end of the lordship of Lichtenberg, the town was transferred to the lord of Oberbronn in 1480 and to the count of Linange (fr) in 1541. Like several cities in the vicinity, many of the inhabitants left during the Thirty Years War and the town was uninhabited from 1649–1651. During the Franco-Prussian War, a brigade of the retreating French army passed through the town on 7 August 1870, during which they quickly mobilized to fight what turned out to be a false alert before slowly advancing to La Petite-Pierre.

Since Erckartswiller lacks significant arable land, the inhabitants have historically lived off of the surrounding forests, with a sizeable number of cobblers. The town also has a windmill, located along the Mittelbach River, which was built before 1630 and continued to function until the early 20th century.

=== Religion ===
Saint Apollonia Chapel (French: Chapelle Sainte-Apollonie), dedicated to Saint Apollonia, is the town's Protestant church. The church's bell tower dates to the 14th century and the church is mentioned for the first time in 1371. Alterations and expansions were made in 1613, 1669, and 1739 and the church was restored in 1994.

The sisters of Neuenberg built a house in Erckartswiller in 1973. It houses a small permanent team that manages a reception center and spiritual retreat for visitors from not only Alsace, but Germany and Switzerland as well. A chapel was built on the same property in 1994.

== Geography ==
Erckartswiller lies entirely within the Northern Vosges Regional Nature Park.

== Demographics ==
The inhabitants of Erckartswiller are known as Erckartswillerois (males) and Erckartswilleroises (females) in French. Its population was 293 in 2021.

== See also ==
- Communes of the Bas-Rhin department
