= Menchhoffen =

Menchhoffen Manischoffe
- Commune
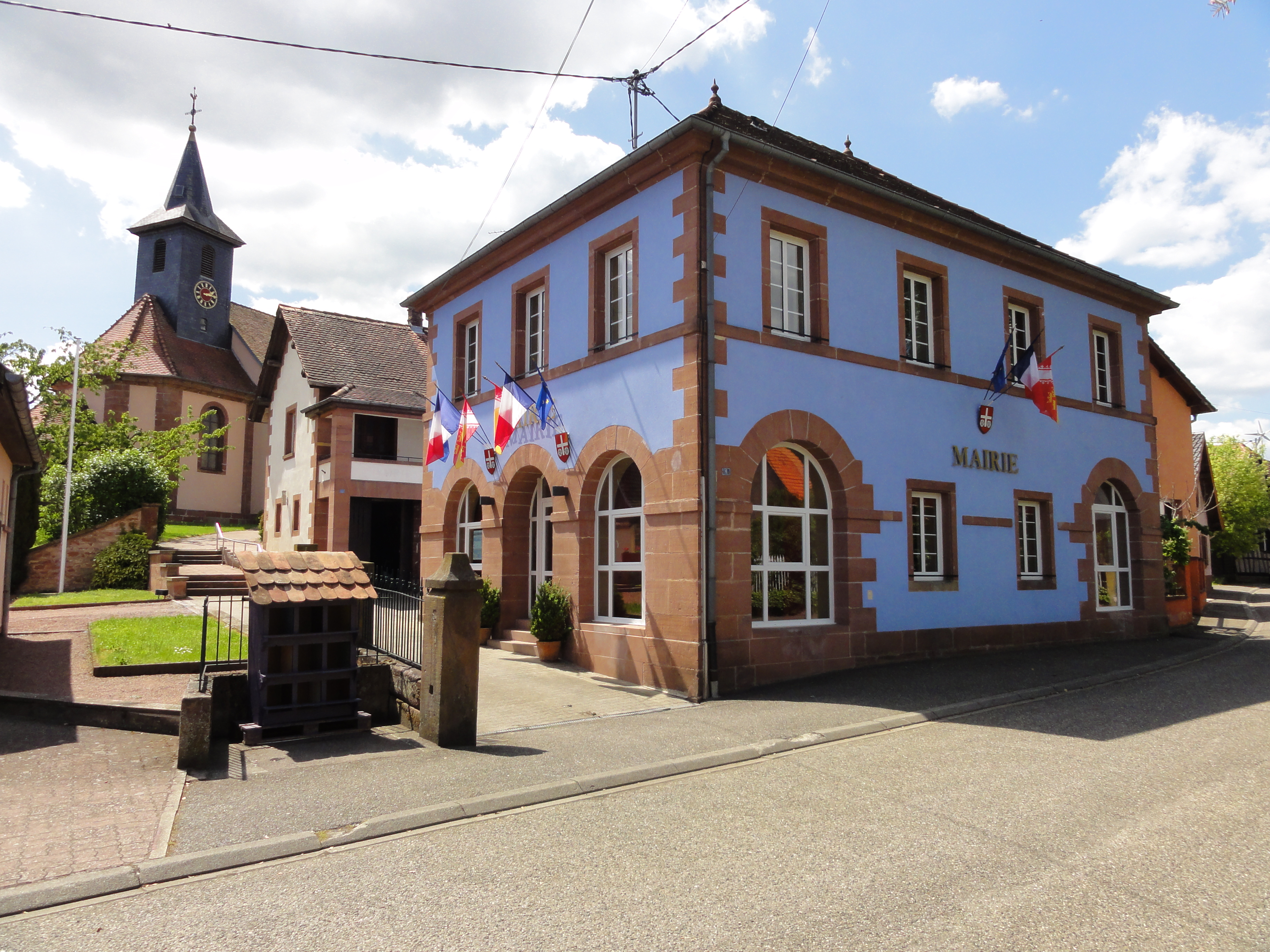
- The town hall in Menchhoffen

- Coat of arms
- Location of Menchhoffen
- Location within France Location within Grand Est
- Coordinates: 48°51′37″N 7°29′57″E
- Country: France
- Region: Grand Est
- Department: Bas-Rhin
- Arrondissement: Saverne
- Canton: Ingwiller

Government
  - Mayor (2020–2026): Alain Danner
- Area^{1}: 4.27 km^{2} (1.65 sq mi)
- Highest elevation: 233 m (764 ft)
- Lowest elevation: 177 m (581 ft)
- Population (2023): 598
  - Density: 140/km^{2} (363/sq mi)
- Time zone: UTC+01:00 (CET)
  - Summer (DST): UTC+02:00 (CEST)
- INSEE/Postal code: 67289 /67340
- ^{1} French Land Register data, which excludes lakes, ponds, glaciers > 1 km^{2} (0.386 sq mi or 247 acres) and river estuaries.

Menchhoffen (French pronunciation: [mɛnʃofən]) is a commune in the Bas-Rhin department in Grand Est in north-eastern France.

== See also ==
- Communes of the Bas-Rhin department
