= Berg, Bas-Rhin =

Berg Bärich
- Commune
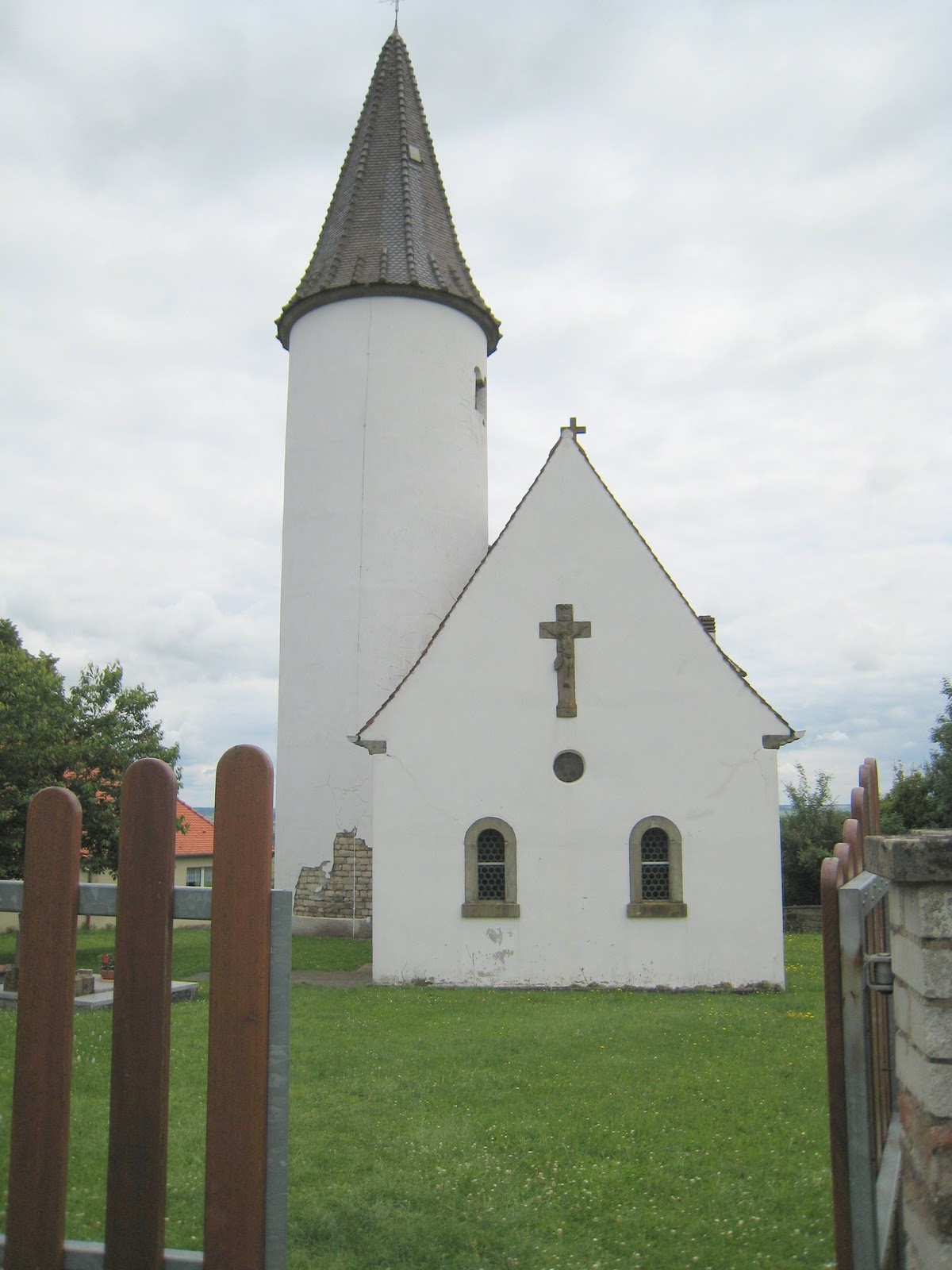
- The church in Berg

- Coat of arms
- Location of Berg
- Location within France Location within Grand Est
- Coordinates: 48°53′53″N 7°09′25″E
- Country: France
- Region: Grand Est
- Department: Bas-Rhin
- Arrondissement: Saverne
- Canton: Ingwiller

Government
  - Mayor (2020–2026): Jean-Pierre Nickles
- Area^{1}: 7.72 km^{2} (2.98 sq mi)
- Highest elevation: 359 m (1,178 ft)
- Lowest elevation: 240 m (790 ft)
- Population (2023): 347
  - Density: 44.9/km^{2} (116/sq mi)
- Time zone: UTC+01:00 (CET)
  - Summer (DST): UTC+02:00 (CEST)
- INSEE/Postal code: 67029 /67320
- ^{1} French Land Register data, which excludes lakes, ponds, glaciers > 1 km^{2} (0.386 sq mi or 247 acres) and river estuaries.

Berg (French pronunciation: [bɛʁg]) is a commune in the Bas-Rhin department in Grand Est in northeastern France.

== Population ==
Historical population
Year	Pop.	±% p.a.
1968	411	—
1975	410	−0.03%
1982	436	+0.88%
1990	428	−0.23%
1999	405	−0.61%
2007	404	−0.03%
2012	413	+0.44%
2017	365	−2.44%
2023	347	−0.84%
Source: INSEE

== See also ==
- Communes of the Bas-Rhin department
