= Weyer, Bas-Rhin =

Weyer
- Commune
- Coat of arms
- Location of Weyer
- Location within France Location within Grand Est
- Coordinates: 48°51′18″N 7°09′33″E
- Country: France
- Region: Grand Est
- Department: Bas-Rhin
- Arrondissement: Saverne
- Canton: Ingwiller
- Intercommunality: Alsace Bossue

Government
  - Mayor (2020–2026): Eddy Rohrbach
- Area^{1}: 11.58 km^{2} (4.47 sq mi)
- Highest elevation: 354 m (1,161 ft)
- Lowest elevation: 257 m (843 ft)
- Population (2023): 509
  - Density: 44.0/km^{2} (114/sq mi)
- Time zone: UTC+01:00 (CET)
  - Summer (DST): UTC+02:00 (CEST)
- INSEE/Postal code: 67528 /67320
- ^{1} French Land Register data, which excludes lakes, ponds, glaciers > 1 km^{2} (0.386 sq mi or 247 acres) and river estuaries.

Weyer is a commune in the Bas-Rhin department in Grand Est in north-eastern France.

== Population ==
Historical population
Year	Pop.	±% p.a.
1968	551	—
1975	562	+0.28%
1982	514	−1.27%
1990	450	−1.65%
1999	496	+1.09%
2007	586	+2.11%
2012	614	+0.94%
2017	576	−1.27%
2023	509	−2.04%
Source: INSEE

== See also ==
- Communes of the Bas-Rhin department
