= Lohr, Bas-Rhin =

Lohr
- Commune
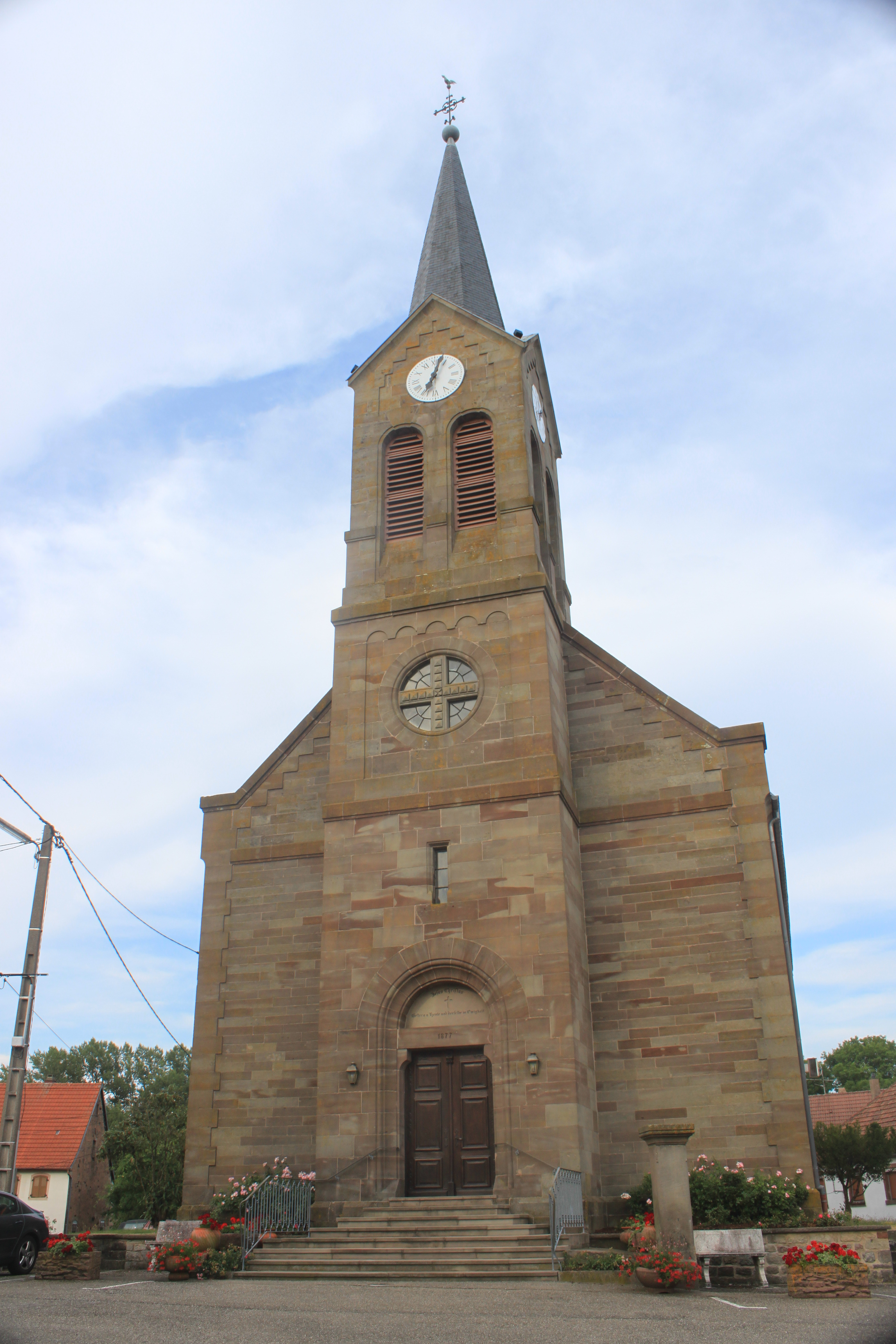
- The church in Lohr

- Coat of arms
- Location of Lohr
- Location within France Location within Grand Est
- Coordinates: 48°51′29″N 7°14′39″E
- Country: France
- Region: Grand Est
- Department: Bas-Rhin
- Arrondissement: Saverne
- Canton: Ingwiller

Government
  - Mayor (2023–2026): Pierre Gangloff
- Area^{1}: 10.41 km^{2} (4.02 sq mi)
- Highest elevation: 383 m (1,257 ft)
- Lowest elevation: 217 m (712 ft)
- Population (2023): 444
  - Density: 42.7/km^{2} (110/sq mi)
- Time zone: UTC+01:00 (CET)
  - Summer (DST): UTC+02:00 (CEST)
- INSEE/Postal code: 67273 /67290
- ^{1} French Land Register data, which excludes lakes, ponds, glaciers > 1 km^{2} (0.386 sq mi or 247 acres) and river estuaries.

Lohr (French pronunciation: [lɔʁ]) is a commune in the Bas-Rhin department in Grand Est in north-eastern France.

== See also ==
- Communes of the Bas-Rhin department
