= Arrondissement of Saverne =

Coordinates: 48.73°N 7.37°E

Saverne Zàwra
- Arrondissement
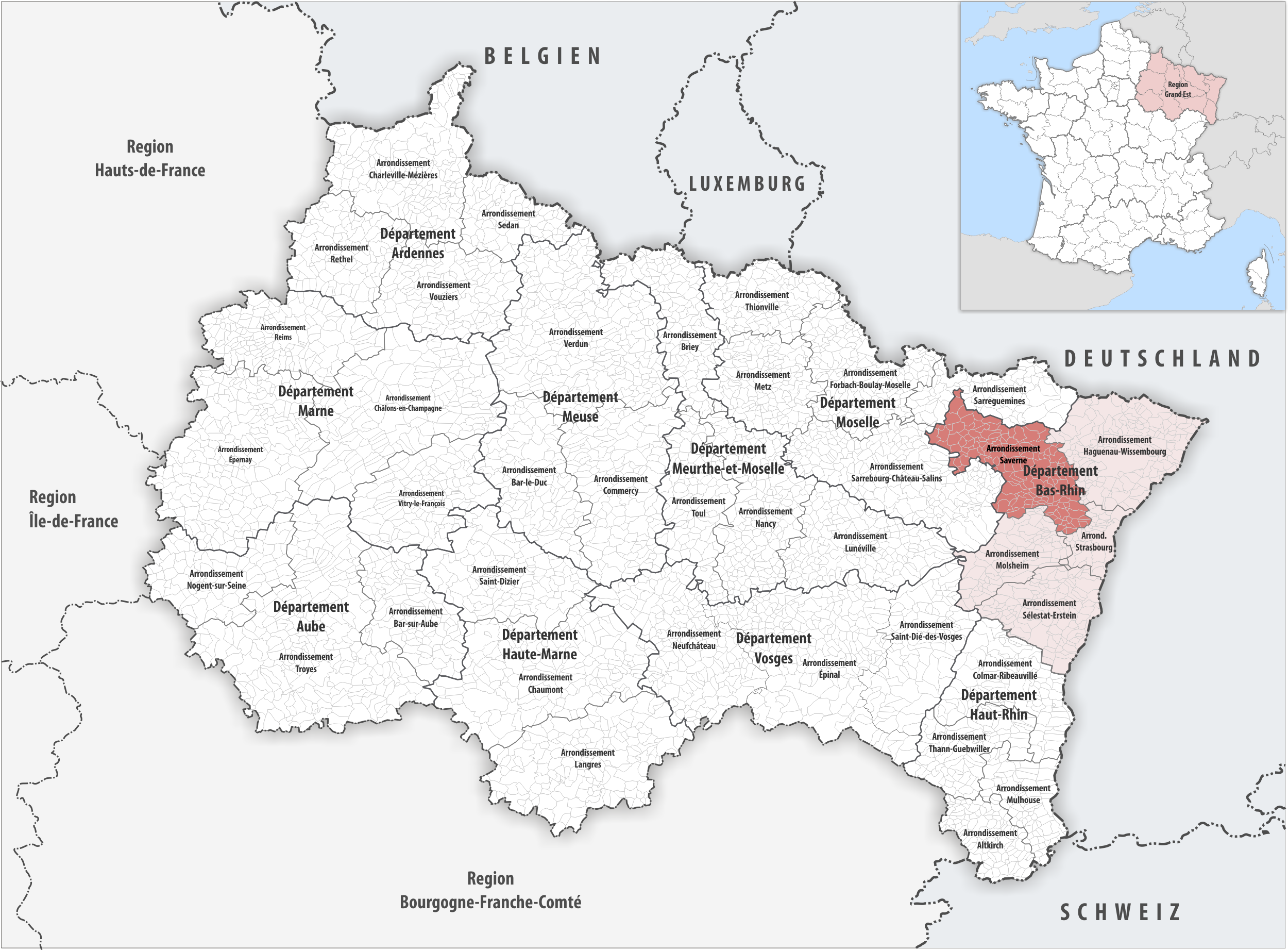
- Location within the region Grand Est
- Country: France
- Region: Grand Est
- Department: Bas-Rhin
- No. of communes: {{{nbcomm}}}
- Area: 1,241.0 km^{2} (479.2 sq mi)
- Population (2023): 129,293
  - Density: 104.18/km^{2} (269.84/sq mi)
- INSEE code: 674

The arrondissement of Saverne (French: Arrondissement de Saverne; Alsatian: Arrondissement Zàwra) is an arrondissement of France in the Bas-Rhin department in the Grand Est region. It has 162 communes. Its population is 129,666 (2021), and its area is 1,241.0 km^{2} (479.2 sq mi).

== Composition ==
The communes of the arrondissement of Saverne are:

1. Adamswiller
2. Alteckendorf
3. Altenheim
4. Altwiller
5. Asswiller
6. Baerendorf
7. Berg
8. Berstett
9. Bettwiller
10. Bischholtz
11. Bissert
12. Bosselshausen
13. Bossendorf
14. Bouxwiller
15. Burbach
16. Bust
17. Buswiller
18. Butten
19. Dehlingen
20. Dettwiller
21. Diedendorf
22. Diemeringen
23. Dimbsthal
24. Dingsheim
25. Domfessel
26. Dossenheim-Kochersberg
27. Dossenheim-sur-Zinsel
28. Drulingen
29. Duntzenheim
30. Durningen
31. Durstel
32. Eckartswiller
33. Erckartswiller
34. Ernolsheim-lès-Saverne
35. Eschbourg
36. Eschwiller
37. Ettendorf
38. Eywiller
39. Fessenheim-le-Bas
40. Friedolsheim
41. Frohmuhl
42. Furchhausen
43. Furdenheim
44. Geiswiller-Zœbersdorf
45. Gœrlingen
46. Gottenhouse
47. Gottesheim
48. Gougenheim
49. Grassendorf
50. Griesheim-sur-Souffel
51. Gungwiller
52. Haegen
53. Handschuheim
54. Harskirchen
55. Hattmatt
56. Hengwiller
57. Herbitzheim
58. Hinsbourg
59. Hinsingen
60. Hirschland
61. Hochfelden
62. Hohfrankenheim
63. Hurtigheim
64. Ingenheim
65. Ingwiller
66. Issenhausen
67. Ittenheim
68. Keskastel
69. Kienheim
70. Kirrberg
71. Kirrwiller
72. Kleingœft
73. Kuttolsheim
74. Landersheim
75. Lichtenberg
76. Littenheim
77. Lixhausen
78. Lochwiller
79. Lohr
80. Lorentzen
81. Lupstein
82. Mackwiller
83. Maennolsheim
84. Marmoutier
85. Melsheim
86. Menchhoffen
87. Minversheim
88. Monswiller
89. Mulhausen
90. Mutzenhouse
91. Neugartheim-Ittlenheim
92. Neuwiller-lès-Saverne
93. Niedersoultzbach
94. Obermodern-Zutzendorf
95. Obersoultzbach
96. Oermingen
97. Ottersthal
98. Otterswiller
99. Ottwiller
100. Petersbach
101. La Petite-Pierre
102. Pfalzweyer
103. Pfulgriesheim
104. Printzheim
105. Puberg
106. Quatzenheim
107. Ratzwiller
108. Rauwiller
109. Reinhardsmunster
110. Reipertswiller
111. Reutenbourg
112. Rexingen
113. Rimsdorf
114. Ringendorf
115. Rohr
116. Rosteig
117. Saessolsheim
118. Saint-Jean-Saverne
119. Sarre-Union
120. Sarrewerden
121. Saverne
122. Schalkendorf
123. Scherlenheim
124. Schillersdorf
125. Schnersheim
126. Schœnbourg
127. Schopperten
128. Schwenheim
129. Schwindratzheim
130. Siewiller
131. Siltzheim
132. Sommerau
133. Sparsbach
134. Steinbourg
135. Struth
136. Stutzheim-Offenheim
137. Thal-Drulingen
138. Thal-Marmoutier
139. Tieffenbach
140. Truchtersheim
141. Uttwiller
142. Vœllerdingen
143. Volksberg
144. Waldhambach
145. Waldolwisheim
146. Waltenheim-sur-Zorn
147. Weinbourg
148. Weislingen
149. Weiterswiller
150. Westhouse-Marmoutier
151. Weyer
152. Wickersheim-Wilshausen
153. Willgottheim
154. Wilwisheim
155. Wimmenau
156. Wingen-sur-Moder
157. Wingersheim-les-Quatre-Bans
158. Wintzenheim-Kochersberg
159. Wiwersheim
160. Wolfskirchen
161. Wolschheim
162. Zittersheim

== History ==
The arrondissement of Saverne was created in 1800, disbanded in 1871 (ceded to Germany) and restored in 1919. In January 2015 it gained 53 communes from the former arrondissement of Strasbourg-Campagne, and it lost two communes to the new arrondissement of Haguenau-Wissembourg and seven communes to the arrondissement of Molsheim.

As a result of the reorganisation of the cantons of France which came into effect in 2015, the borders of the cantons are no longer related to the borders of the arrondissements. The cantons of the arrondissement of Saverne were, as of January 2015:

1. Bouxwiller
2. Drulingen
3. Marmoutier
4. La Petite-Pierre
5. Sarre-Union
6. Saverne
