= Schopperten =

- Commune
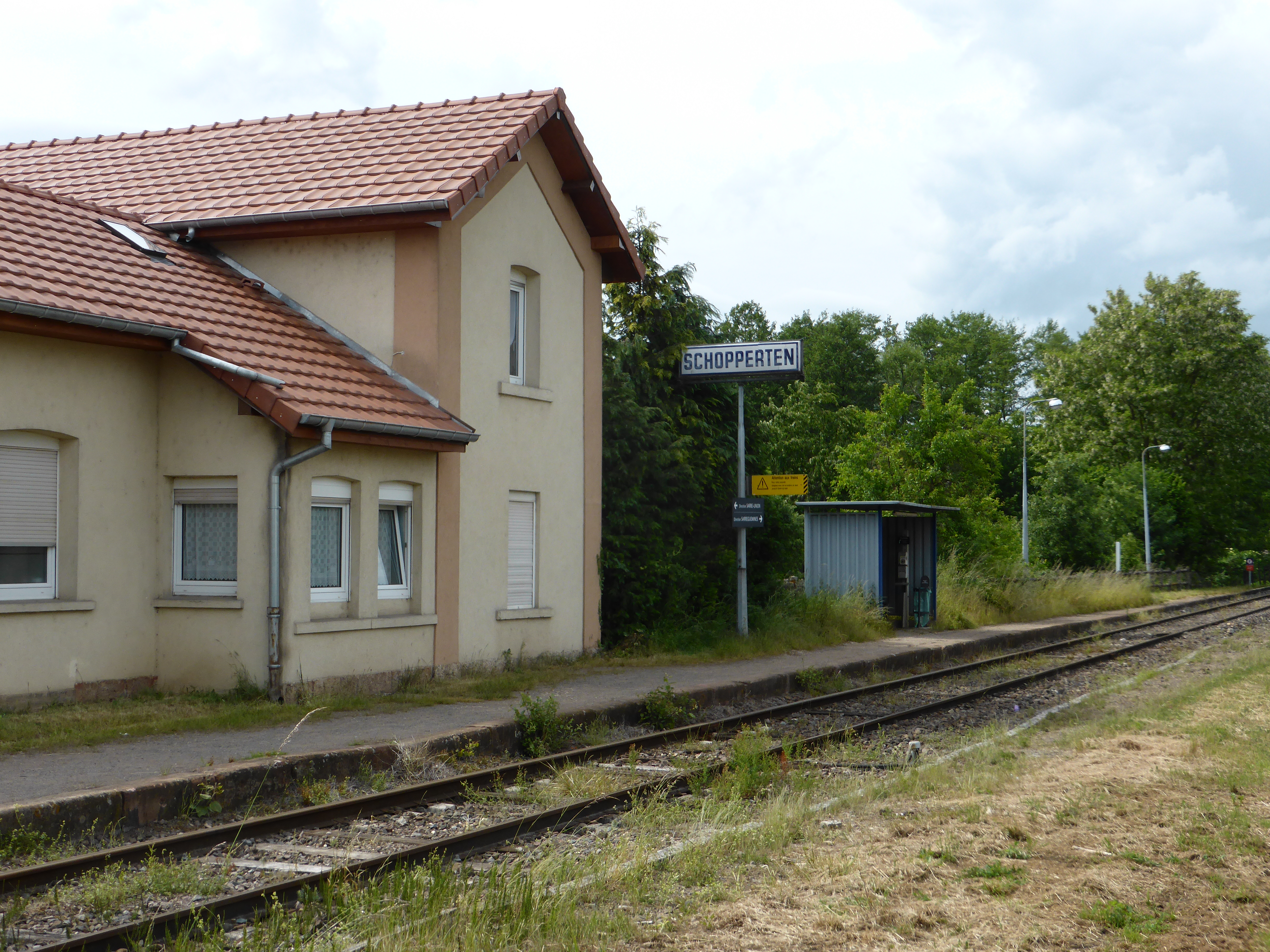
- The railway station in Schopperten

- Coat of arms
- Location of Schopperten
- Location within France Location within Grand Est
- Coordinates: 48°56′51″N 7°03′05″E
- Country: France
- Region: Grand Est
- Department: Bas-Rhin
- Arrondissement: Saverne
- Canton: Ingwiller
- Intercommunality: Alsace Bossue

Government
  - Mayor (2020–2026): Sylvie Reeb
- Area^{1}: 4.19 km^{2} (1.62 sq mi)
- Highest elevation: 245 m (804 ft)
- Lowest elevation: 213 m (699 ft)
- Population (2023): 407
  - Density: 97.1/km^{2} (252/sq mi)
- Time zone: UTC+01:00 (CET)
  - Summer (DST): UTC+02:00 (CEST)
- INSEE/Postal code: 67456 /67260
- ^{1} French Land Register data, which excludes lakes, ponds, glaciers > 1 km^{2} (0.386 sq mi or 247 acres) and river estuaries.

Schopperten is a commune in the Bas-Rhin department and Grand Est region of north-eastern France.

== See also ==
- Communes of the Bas-Rhin department
