= Bischholtz =

Bischholtz Bíscholz
- Commune
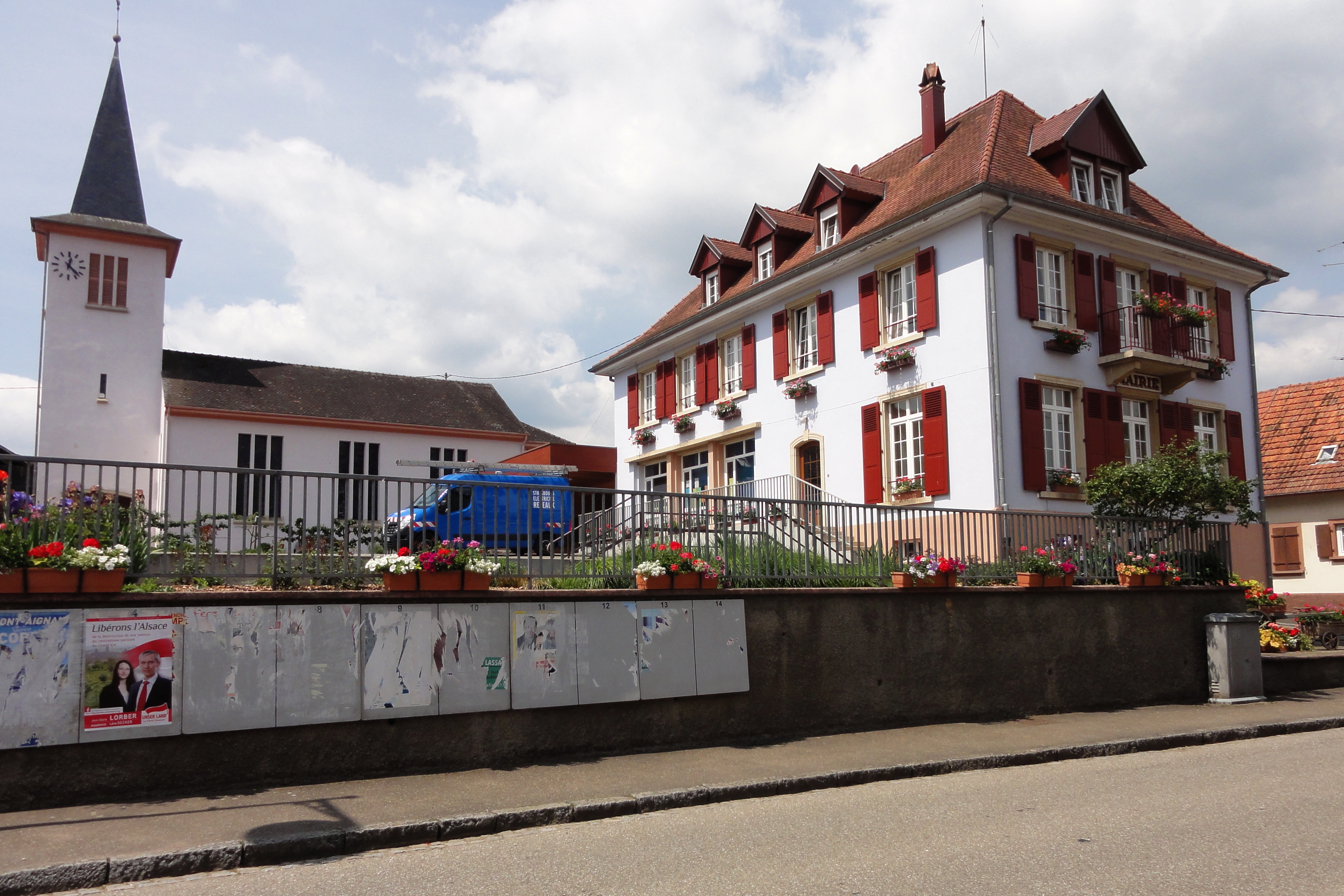
- The church and town hall in Bischholtz

- Coat of arms
- Location of Bischholtz
- Location within France Location within Grand Est
- Coordinates: 48°53′36″N 7°32′28″E
- Country: France
- Region: Grand Est
- Department: Bas-Rhin
- Arrondissement: Saverne
- Canton: Ingwiller

Government
  - Mayor (2020–2026): Thierry Spach
- Area^{1}: 2.39 km^{2} (0.92 sq mi)
- Highest elevation: 242 m (794 ft)
- Lowest elevation: 182 m (597 ft)
- Population (2023): 251
  - Density: 105/km^{2} (272/sq mi)
- Time zone: UTC+01:00 (CET)
  - Summer (DST): UTC+02:00 (CEST)
- INSEE/Postal code: 67044 /67340
- ^{1} French Land Register data, which excludes lakes, ponds, glaciers > 1 km^{2} (0.386 sq mi or 247 acres) and river estuaries.

Bischholtz (French pronunciation: [biʃɔlts]; German: Bischholz) is a commune in the Bas-Rhin department in Grand Est in northeastern France.

== Population ==
Historical population
Year	Pop.	±% p.a.
1968	252	—
1975	256	+0.23%
1982	240	−0.92%
1990	244	+0.21%
1999	240	−0.18%
2007	274	+1.67%
2012	279	+0.36%
2017	273	−0.43%
2023	251	−1.39%
Source: INSEE

== See also ==
- Communes of the Bas-Rhin department
