= Siewiller =

- Commune
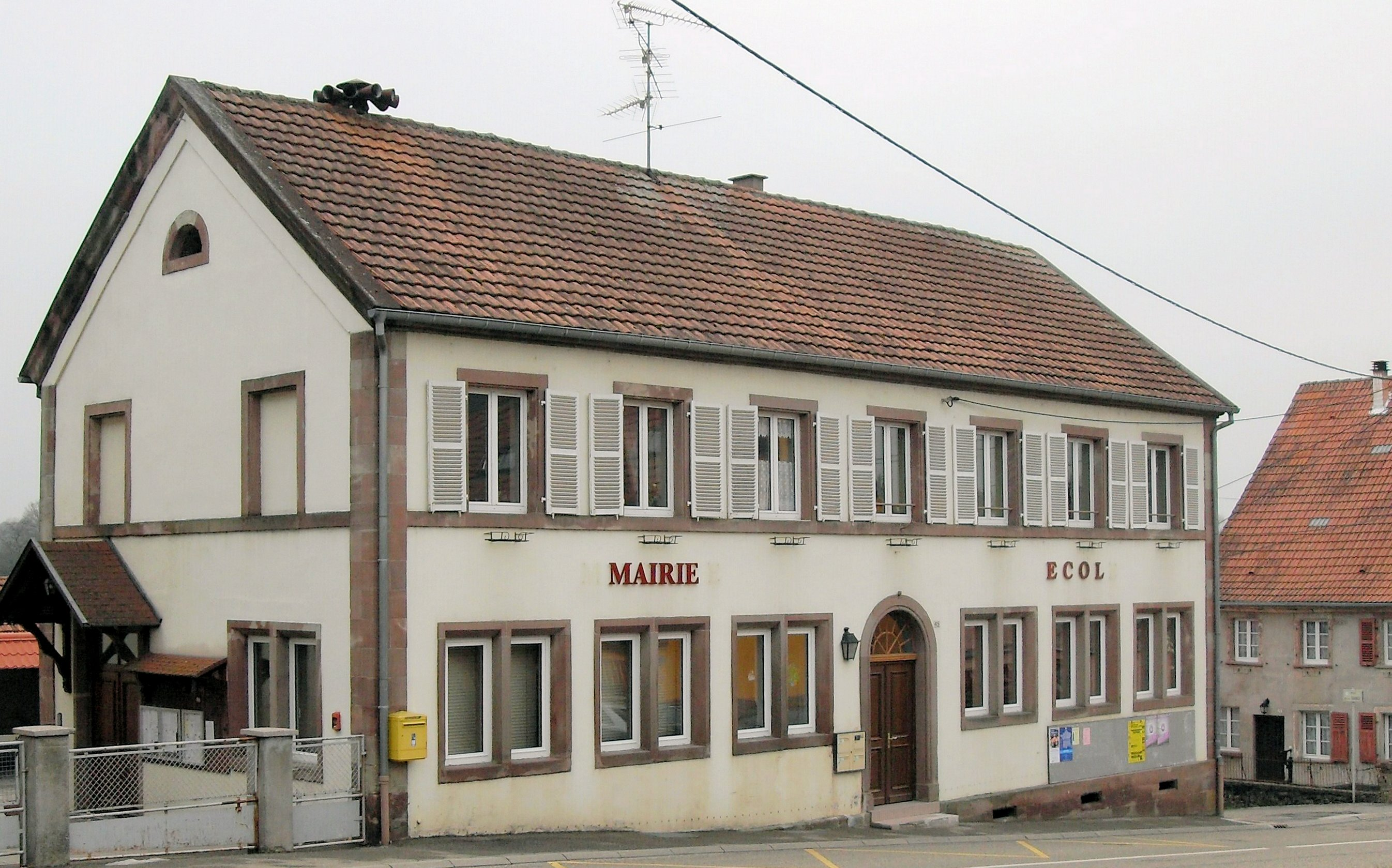
- The town hall in Siewiller

- Coat of arms
- Location of Siewiller
- Location within France Location within Grand Est
- Coordinates: 48°50′42″N 7°12′08″E
- Country: France
- Region: Grand Est
- Department: Bas-Rhin
- Arrondissement: Saverne
- Canton: Ingwiller

Government
  - Mayor (2020–2026): Guy Fenrich
- Area^{1}: 6.2 km^{2} (2.4 sq mi)
- Highest elevation: 357 m (1,171 ft)
- Lowest elevation: 270 m (890 ft)
- Population (2023): 380
  - Density: 61/km^{2} (160/sq mi)
- Time zone: UTC+01:00 (CET)
  - Summer (DST): UTC+02:00 (CEST)
- INSEE/Postal code: 67467 /67320
- ^{1} French Land Register data, which excludes lakes, ponds, glaciers > 1 km^{2} (0.386 sq mi or 247 acres) and river estuaries.

Siewiller (French pronunciation: [sivilɛʁ]; German: Sieweiler; Alsatian: Sììwiller) is a commune in the Bas-Rhin department in Grand Est in north-eastern France.

== See also ==
- Communes of the Bas-Rhin department
