= Diedendorf =

Diedendorf Dììdedorf
- Commune
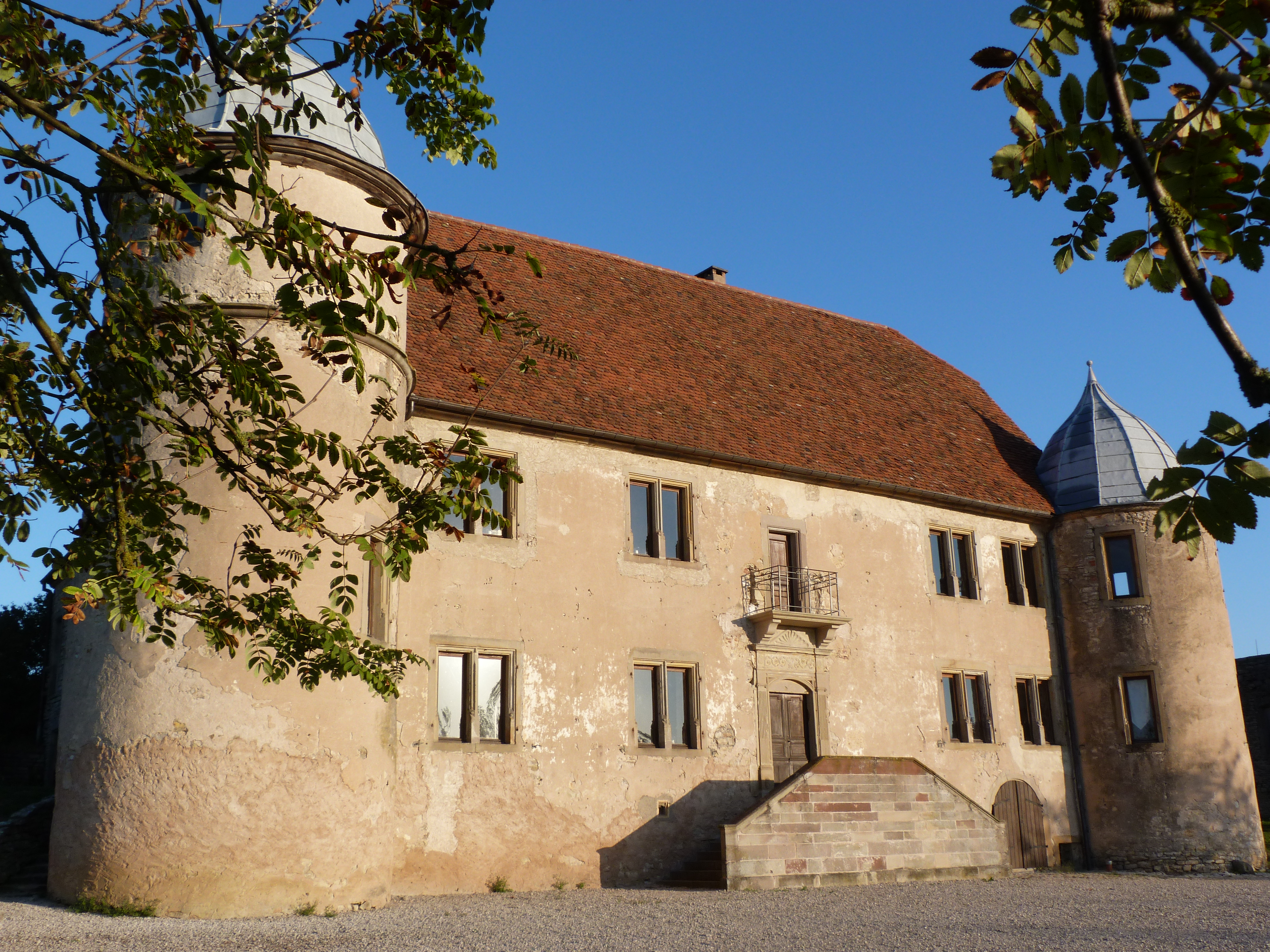
- The chateau in Diedendorf

- Coat of arms
- Location of Diedendorf
- Location within France Location within Grand Est
- Coordinates: 48°52′49″N 7°02′45″E
- Country: France
- Region: Grand Est
- Department: Bas-Rhin
- Arrondissement: Saverne
- Canton: Ingwiller

Government
  - Mayor (2020–2026): Jacky Eberhardt
- Area^{1}: 10.11 km^{2} (3.90 sq mi)
- Highest elevation: 286 m (938 ft)
- Lowest elevation: 220 m (720 ft)
- Population (2023): 314
  - Density: 31.1/km^{2} (80.4/sq mi)
- Time zone: UTC+01:00 (CET)
  - Summer (DST): UTC+02:00 (CEST)
- INSEE/Postal code: 67091 /67260
- ^{1} French Land Register data, which excludes lakes, ponds, glaciers > 1 km^{2} (0.386 sq mi or 247 acres) and river estuaries.

Diedendorf (French pronunciation: [didəndɔʁf]) is a commune in the Bas-Rhin department in Grand Est in north-eastern France.

== See also ==
- Communes of the Bas-Rhin department
