= Vœllerdingen =

- Commune
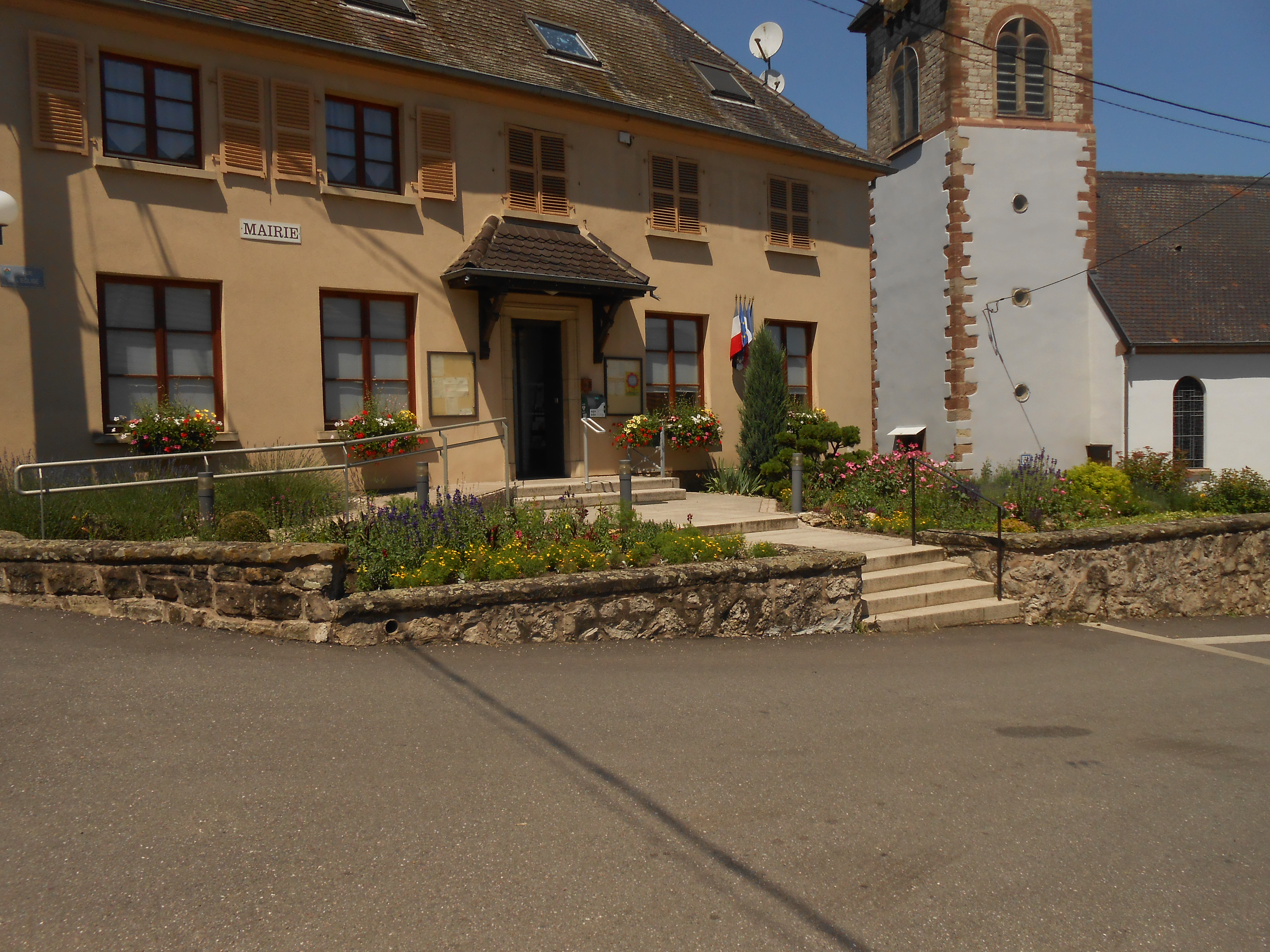
- The town hall in Vœllerdingen

- Coat of arms
- Location of Vœllerdingen
- Location within France Location within Grand Est
- Coordinates: 48°57′45″N 7°08′30″E
- Country: France
- Region: Grand Est
- Department: Bas-Rhin
- Arrondissement: Saverne
- Canton: Ingwiller
- Intercommunality: Alsace Bossue

Government
  - Mayor (2020–2026): Francis Bach
- Area^{1}: 13.05 km^{2} (5.04 sq mi)
- Elevation: 225 m (738 ft)
- Highest elevation: 324 m (1,063 ft)
- Lowest elevation: 215 m (705 ft)
- Population (2023): 418
  - Density: 32.0/km^{2} (83.0/sq mi)
- Time zone: UTC+01:00 (CET)
  - Summer (DST): UTC+02:00 (CEST)
- INSEE/Postal code: 67508 /67430
- ^{1} French Land Register data, which excludes lakes, ponds, glaciers > 1 km^{2} (0.386 sq mi or 247 acres) and river estuaries.

Vœllerdingen (German: Völlerdingen am Eichelbach) is a commune in the Bas-Rhin department in Grand Est in north-eastern France.

== Population ==
Historical population
Year	Pop.	±% p.a.
1968	487	—
1975	456	−0.94%
1982	440	−0.51%
1990	428	−0.35%
1999	419	−0.24%
2007	429	+0.30%
2012	394	−1.69%
2017	398	+0.20%
2023	418	+0.82%
Source: INSEE

== See also ==
- Communes of the Bas-Rhin department
