= Canton of Ingwiller =

Coordinates: 48.87°N 7.48°E

- Canton
- Situation of the canton of Ingwiller in the department of Bas-Rhin
- Country: France
- Region: Grand Est
- Department: Bas-Rhin
- No. of communes: {{{nbcomm}}}
- Population (2023): 42,648
- INSEE code: 6708

The canton of Ingwiller is an administrative division of the Bas-Rhin department, northeastern France. Created at the French canton reorganisation, which came into effect in March 2015, it has its seat in Ingwiller.

It consists of the following communes:

1. Adamswiller
2. Altwiller
3. Asswiller
4. Baerendorf
5. Berg
6. Bettwiller
7. Bischholtz
8. Bissert
9. Burbach
10. Bust
11. Butten
12. Dehlingen
13. Diedendorf
14. Diemeringen
15. Domfessel
16. Dossenheim-sur-Zinsel
17. Drulingen
18. Durstel
19. Erckartswiller
20. Eschbourg
21. Eschwiller
22. Eywiller
23. Frohmuhl
24. Gœrlingen
25. Gungwiller
26. Harskirchen
27. Herbitzheim
28. Hinsbourg
29. Hinsingen
30. Hirschland
31. Ingwiller
32. Keskastel
33. Kirrberg
34. Lichtenberg
35. Lohr
36. Lorentzen
37. Mackwiller
38. Menchhoffen
39. Mulhausen
40. Neuwiller-lès-Saverne
41. Niedersoultzbach
42. Oermingen
43. Ottwiller
44. Petersbach
45. La Petite-Pierre
46. Pfalzweyer
47. Puberg
48. Ratzwiller
49. Rauwiller
50. Reipertswiller
51. Rexingen
52. Rimsdorf
53. Rosteig
54. Sarre-Union
55. Sarrewerden
56. Schillersdorf
57. Schœnbourg
58. Schopperten
59. Siewiller
60. Siltzheim
61. Sparsbach
62. Struth
63. Thal-Drulingen
64. Tieffenbach
65. Vœllerdingen
66. Volksberg
67. Waldhambach
68. Weinbourg
69. Weislingen
70. Weiterswiller
71. Weyer
72. Wimmenau
73. Wingen-sur-Moder
74. Wolfskirchen
75. Zittersheim
