= Rexingen, Bas-Rhin =

Rexingen Rexinge
- Commune
- Coat of arms
- Location of Rexingen
- Location within France Location within Grand Est
- Coordinates: 48°54′11″N 7°10′55″E
- Country: France
- Region: Grand Est
- Department: Bas-Rhin
- Arrondissement: Saverne
- Canton: Ingwiller

Government
  - Mayor (2020–2026): Francis Burry
- Area^{1}: 2.32 km^{2} (0.90 sq mi)
- Highest elevation: 279 m (915 ft)
- Lowest elevation: 233 m (764 ft)
- Population (2023): 202
  - Density: 87.1/km^{2} (226/sq mi)
- Time zone: UTC+01:00 (CET)
  - Summer (DST): UTC+02:00 (CEST)
- INSEE/Postal code: 67396 /67320
- ^{1} French Land Register data, which excludes lakes, ponds, glaciers > 1 km^{2} (0.386 sq mi or 247 acres) and river estuaries.

Rexingen (French pronunciation: [ʁɛksiŋ(ɡ)ən]) is a commune in the Bas-Rhin department in Grand Est in north-eastern France.

== See also ==
- Communes of the Bas-Rhin department
