= Bust, Bas-Rhin =

Bust Bíscht
- Commune
- Coat of arms
- Location of Bust
- Location within France Location within Grand Est
- Coordinates: 48°49′51″N 7°14′10″E
- Country: France
- Region: Grand Est
- Department: Bas-Rhin
- Arrondissement: Saverne
- Canton: Ingwiller

Government
  - Mayor (2020–2026): Michel Beltran
- Area^{1}: 6.76 km^{2} (2.61 sq mi)
- Highest elevation: 366 m (1,201 ft)
- Lowest elevation: 228 m (748 ft)
- Population (2023): 454
  - Density: 67.2/km^{2} (174/sq mi)
- Time zone: UTC+01:00 (CET)
  - Summer (DST): UTC+02:00 (CEST)
- INSEE/Postal code: 67071 /67320
- ^{1} French Land Register data, which excludes lakes, ponds, glaciers > 1 km^{2} (0.386 sq mi or 247 acres) and river estuaries.

Bust (French pronunciation: [byst]; German: Büst) is a commune in the Bas-Rhin department in Grand Est in north-eastern France.

== See also ==
- Communes of the Bas-Rhin department
