= Rauwiller =

- Commune
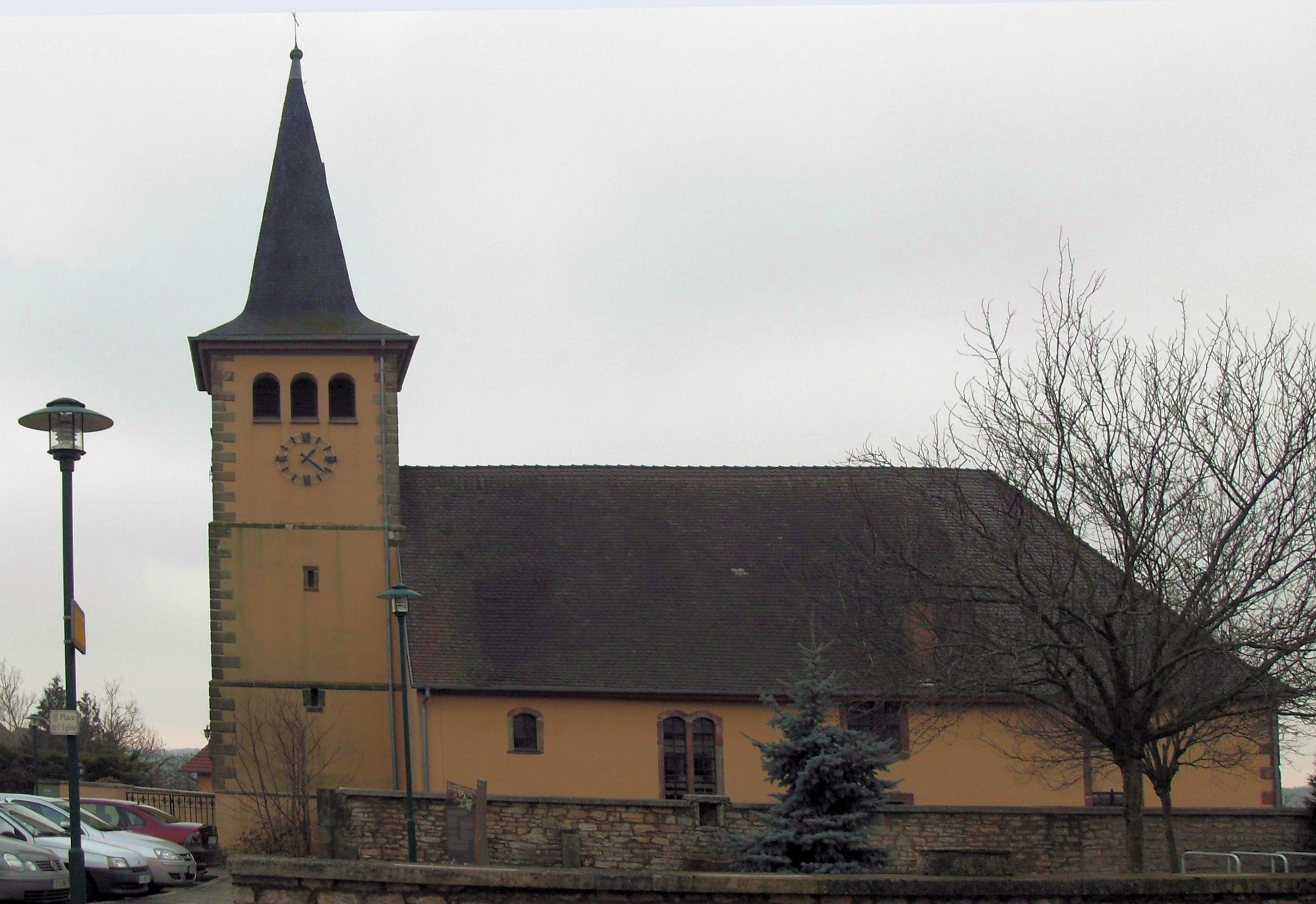
- Reformed Church (EPRAL)

- Coat of arms
- Location of Rauwiller
- Location within France Location within Grand Est
- Coordinates: 48°48′44″N 7°06′31″E
- Country: France
- Region: Grand Est
- Department: Bas-Rhin
- Arrondissement: Saverne
- Canton: Ingwiller

Government
  - Mayor (2020–2026): Rémy Klein
- Area^{1}: 4.89 km^{2} (1.89 sq mi)
- Highest elevation: 332 m (1,089 ft)
- Lowest elevation: 275 m (902 ft)
- Population (2023): 232
  - Density: 47.4/km^{2} (123/sq mi)
- Time zone: UTC+01:00 (CET)
  - Summer (DST): UTC+02:00 (CEST)
- INSEE/Postal code: 67386 /67320
- ^{1} French Land Register data, which excludes lakes, ponds, glaciers > 1 km^{2} (0.386 sq mi or 247 acres) and river estuaries.

Rauwiller (French pronunciation: [ʁauvilɛʁ]; German: Rauweiler) is a commune in the Bas-Rhin department in Grand Est in north-eastern France.

== See also ==
- Communes of the Bas-Rhin department
