= Waldhambach, Bas-Rhin =

Waldhambach
- Commune
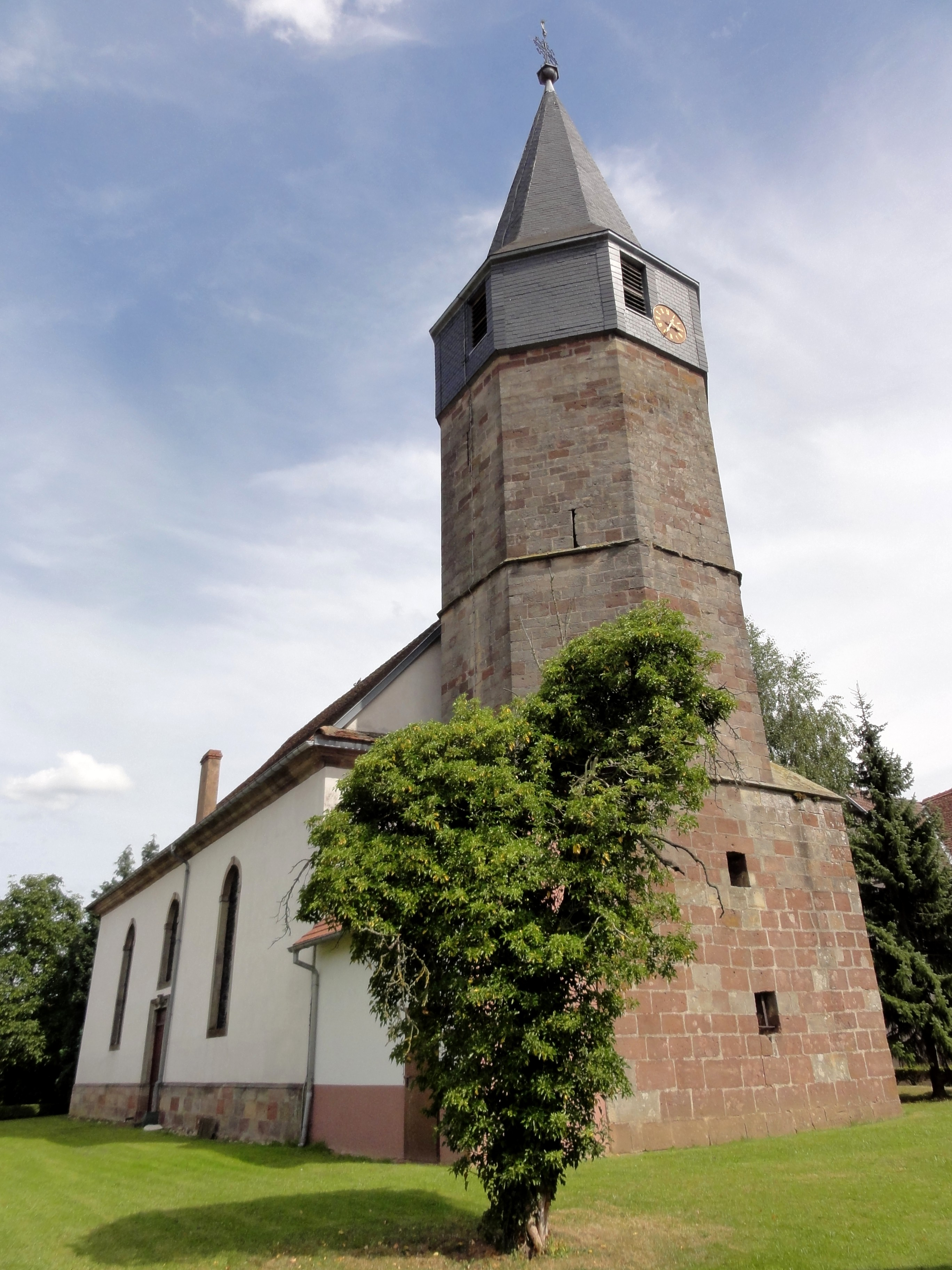
- The Protestant church in Waldhambach

- Coat of arms
- Location of Waldhambach
- Location within France Location within Grand Est
- Coordinates: 48°55′40″N 7°13′04″E
- Country: France
- Region: Grand Est
- Department: Bas-Rhin
- Arrondissement: Saverne
- Canton: Ingwiller
- Intercommunality: Alsace Bossue

Government
  - Mayor (2020–2026): Frédéric Bruppacher
- Area^{1}: 12.59 km^{2} (4.86 sq mi)
- Elevation: 300 m (980 ft)
- Highest elevation: 374 m (1,227 ft)
- Lowest elevation: 225 m (738 ft)
- Population (2023): 598
  - Density: 47.5/km^{2} (123/sq mi)
- Time zone: UTC+01:00 (CET)
  - Summer (DST): UTC+02:00 (CEST)
- INSEE/Postal code: 67514 /67430
- ^{1} French Land Register data, which excludes lakes, ponds, glaciers > 1 km^{2} (0.386 sq mi or 247 acres) and river estuaries.

Waldhambach is a commune in the Bas-Rhin department in Grand Est in north-eastern France.

== Population ==
Historical population
Year	Pop.	±% p.a.
1968	756	—
1975	761	+0.09%
1982	694	−1.31%
1990	626	−1.28%
1999	682	+0.96%
2007	666	−0.30%
2012	624	−1.29%
2017	626	+0.06%
2023	598	−0.76%
Source: INSEE

== See also ==
- Communes of the Bas-Rhin department
