= Weinbourg =

- Commune
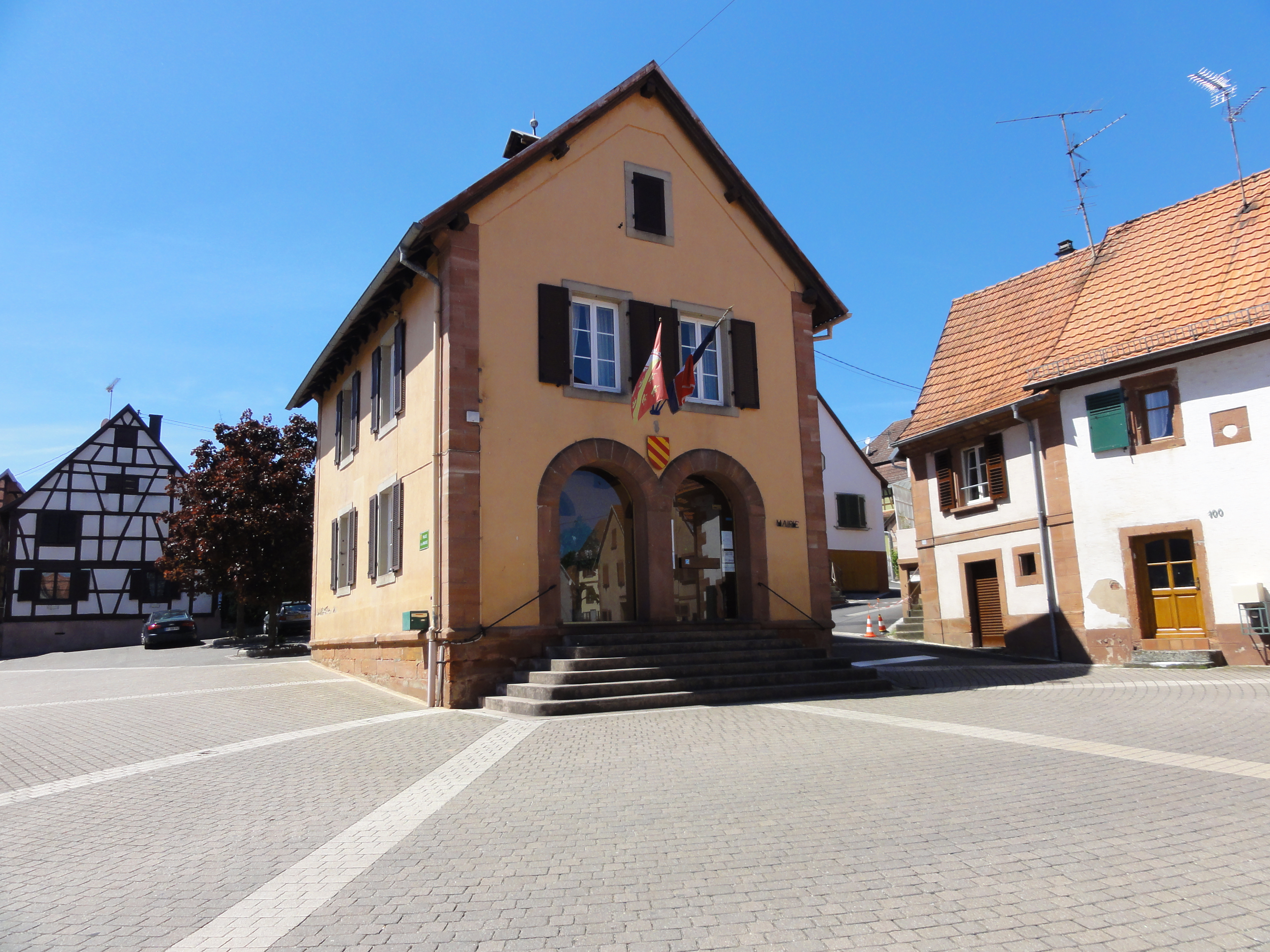
- The town hall in Weinbourg

- Coat of arms
- Location of Weinbourg
- Location within France Location within Grand Est
- Coordinates: 48°52′19″N 7°26′29″E
- Country: France
- Region: Grand Est
- Department: Bas-Rhin
- Arrondissement: Saverne
- Canton: Ingwiller
- Intercommunality: Hanau-La Petite Pierre

Government
  - Mayor (2020–2026): Yves Rudio
- Area^{1}: 5.29 km^{2} (2.04 sq mi)
- Elevation: 215 m (705 ft)
- Highest elevation: 350 m (1,150 ft)
- Lowest elevation: 195 m (640 ft)
- Population (2023): 467
  - Density: 88.3/km^{2} (229/sq mi)
- Time zone: UTC+01:00 (CET)
  - Summer (DST): UTC+02:00 (CEST)
- INSEE/Postal code: 67521 /67340
- ^{1} French Land Register data, which excludes lakes, ponds, glaciers > 1 km^{2} (0.386 sq mi or 247 acres) and river estuaries.

Weinbourg (German: Weinburg) is a commune in the Bas-Rhin department in Grand Est in north-eastern France.

== Population ==
Historical population
Year	Pop.	±% p.a.
1968	486	—
1975	451	−1.06%
1982	457	+0.19%
1990	473	+0.43%
1999	468	−0.12%
2007	455	−0.35%
2012	413	−1.92%
2017	432	+0.90%
2023	467	+1.31%
Source: INSEE

== See also ==
- Communes of the Bas-Rhin department
