= Niedersoultzbach =

- Commune
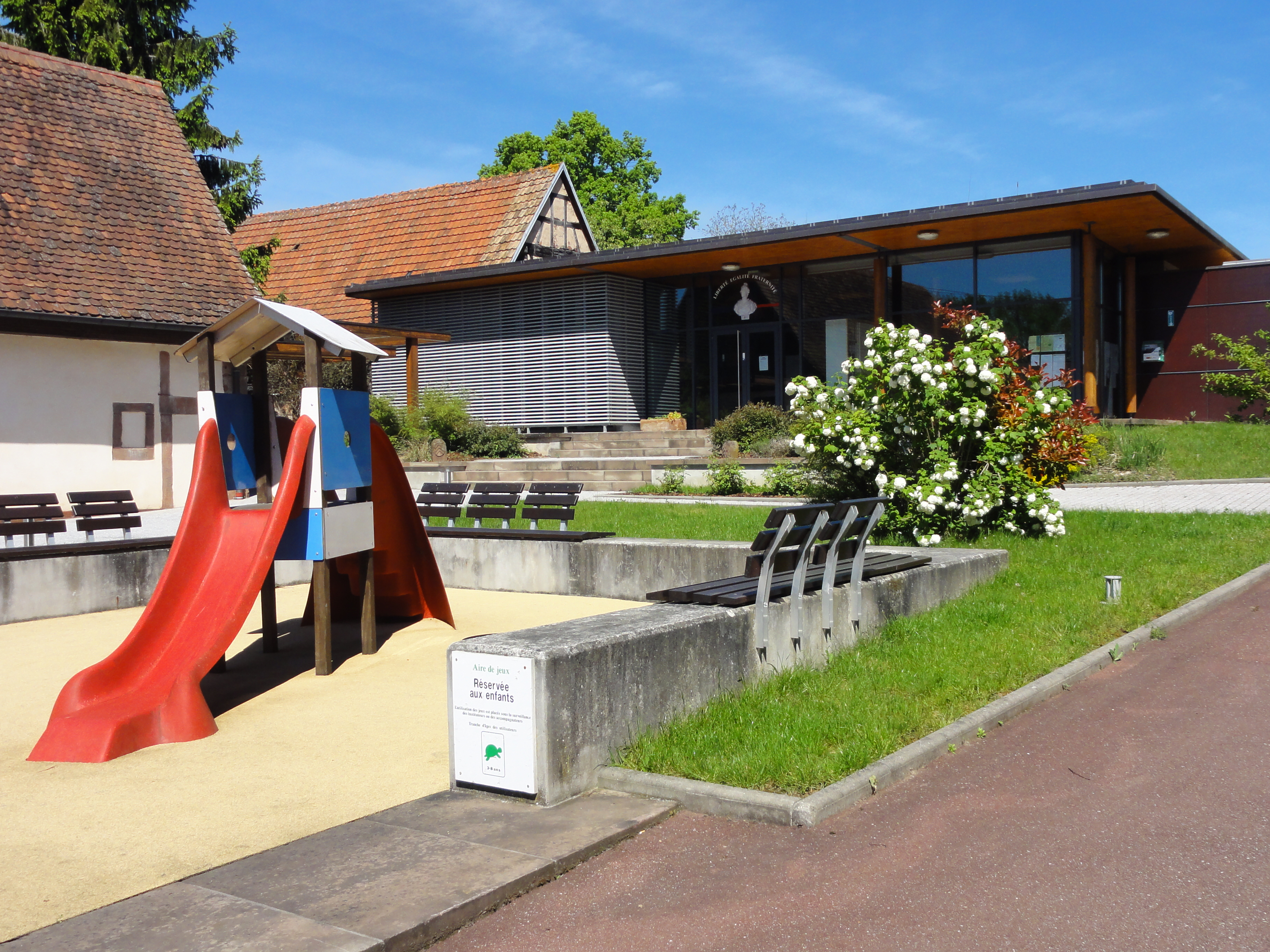
- The town hall in Niedersoultzbach

- Coat of arms
- Location of Niedersoultzbach
- Location within France Location within Grand Est
- Coordinates: 48°51′00″N 7°28′01″E
- Country: France
- Region: Grand Est
- Department: Bas-Rhin
- Arrondissement: Saverne
- Canton: Ingwiller

Government
  - Mayor (2020–2026): Jean-Michel Hoerth
- Area^{1}: 4.19 km^{2} (1.62 sq mi)
- Highest elevation: 233 m (764 ft)
- Lowest elevation: 188 m (617 ft)
- Population (2023): 299
  - Density: 71.4/km^{2} (185/sq mi)
- Time zone: UTC+01:00 (CET)
  - Summer (DST): UTC+02:00 (CEST)
- INSEE/Postal code: 67333 /67330
- ^{1} French Land Register data, which excludes lakes, ponds, glaciers > 1 km^{2} (0.386 sq mi or 247 acres) and river estuaries.

Niedersoultzbach (German: Nieder-Sulzbach or Niedersulzbach) is a commune in the Bas-Rhin department in Grand Est in north-eastern France.

== See also ==
- Communes of the Bas-Rhin department
