= Rimsdorf =

- Commune
- Coat of arms
- Location of Rimsdorf
- Location within France Location within Grand Est
- Coordinates: 48°55′49″N 7°07′37″E
- Country: France
- Region: Grand Est
- Department: Bas-Rhin
- Arrondissement: Saverne
- Canton: Ingwiller

Government
  - Mayor (2020–2026): Didier Engelmann
- Area^{1}: 6.07 km^{2} (2.34 sq mi)
- Highest elevation: 352 m (1,155 ft)
- Lowest elevation: 225 m (738 ft)
- Population (2023): 287
  - Density: 47.3/km^{2} (122/sq mi)
- Time zone: UTC+01:00 (CET)
  - Summer (DST): UTC+02:00 (CEST)
- INSEE/Postal code: 67401 /67260
- ^{1} French Land Register data, which excludes lakes, ponds, glaciers > 1 km^{2} (0.386 sq mi or 247 acres) and river estuaries.

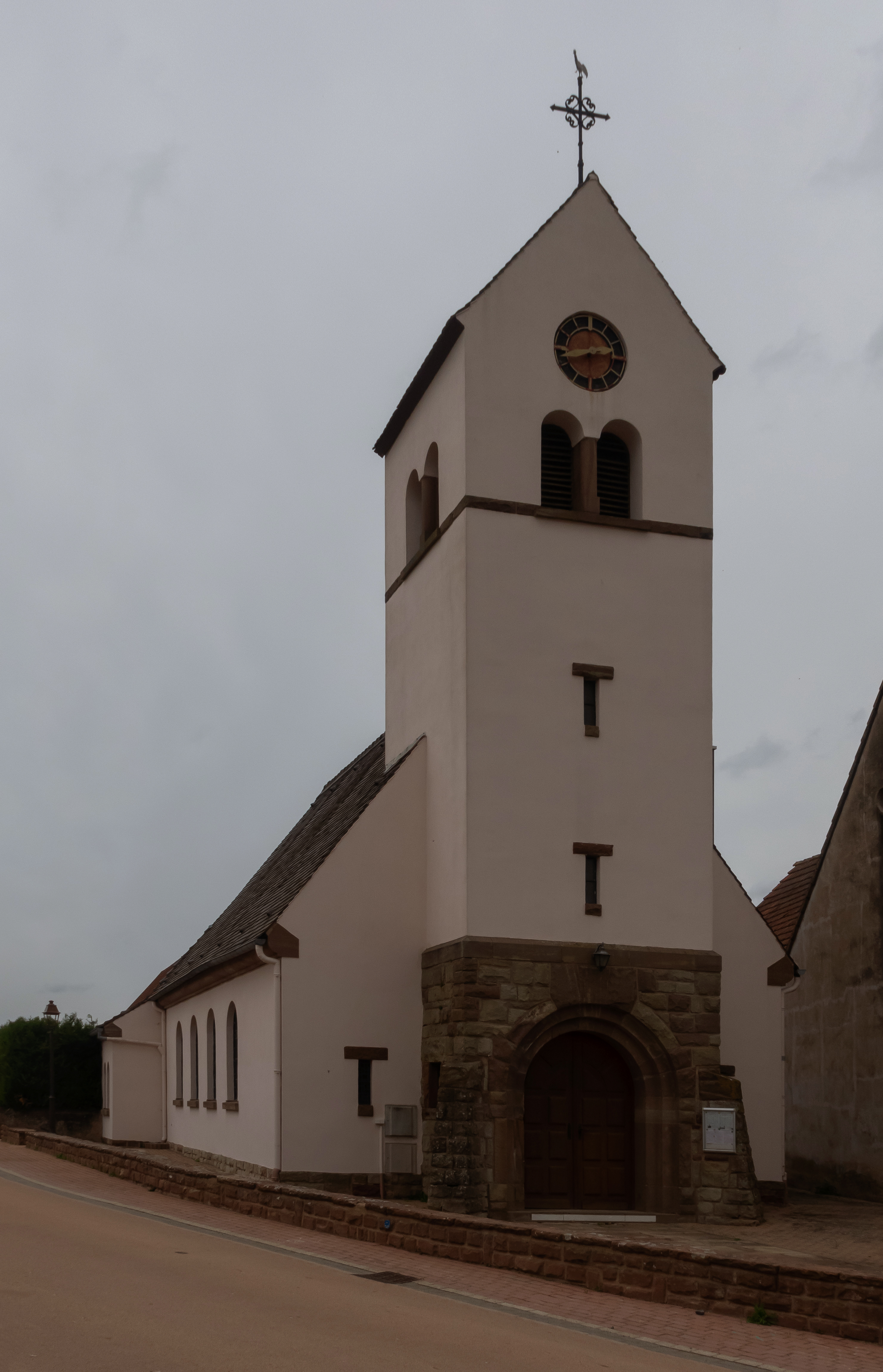
Rimsdorf, reformed church

Rimsdorf (French pronunciation: [ʁimsdɔʁf]) is a commune in the Bas-Rhin department in Grand Est in north-eastern France.

== See also ==
- Communes of the Bas-Rhin department
