= Schœnbourg =

- Commune
- Coat of arms
- Location of Schœnbourg
- Location within France Location within Grand Est
- Coordinates: 48°50′02″N 7°16′03″E
- Country: France
- Region: Grand Est
- Department: Bas-Rhin
- Arrondissement: Saverne
- Canton: Ingwiller

Government
  - Mayor (2020–2026): André Spaedig
- Area^{1}: 5.06 km^{2} (1.95 sq mi)
- Highest elevation: 361 m (1,184 ft)
- Lowest elevation: 212 m (696 ft)
- Population (2023): 366
  - Density: 72.3/km^{2} (187/sq mi)
- Time zone: UTC+01:00 (CET)
  - Summer (DST): UTC+02:00 (CEST)
- INSEE/Postal code: 67454 /67320
- ^{1} French Land Register data, which excludes lakes, ponds, glaciers > 1 km^{2} (0.386 sq mi or 247 acres) and river estuaries.

Schœnbourg (French pronunciation: [ʃønbuʁ]; German: Schönburg) is a commune in the Bas-Rhin department in Grand Est in north-eastern France.

== See also ==
- Communes of the Bas-Rhin department
