= Butten =

Butten Bìtte
- Commune
- Coat of arms
- Location of Butten
- Location within France Location within Grand Est
- Coordinates: 48°58′18″N 7°13′19″E
- Country: France
- Region: Grand Est
- Department: Bas-Rhin
- Arrondissement: Saverne
- Canton: Ingwiller

Government
  - Mayor (2020–2026): Bruno Stock
- Area^{1}: 15.19 km^{2} (5.86 sq mi)
- Highest elevation: 364 m (1,194 ft)
- Lowest elevation: 227 m (745 ft)
- Population (2023): 640
  - Density: 42/km^{2} (110/sq mi)
- Time zone: UTC+01:00 (CET)
  - Summer (DST): UTC+02:00 (CEST)
- INSEE/Postal code: 67072 /67430
- ^{1} French Land Register data, which excludes lakes, ponds, glaciers > 1 km^{2} (0.386 sq mi or 247 acres) and river estuaries.

Butten (French pronunciation: [bytən]; German: Bütten) is a commune in the Bas-Rhin department in Grand Est in north-eastern France. The inhabitants of Butten are called Buttenois, Buttenoises in French.

== See also ==
- Communes of the Bas-Rhin department
