= Gungwiller =

- Commune
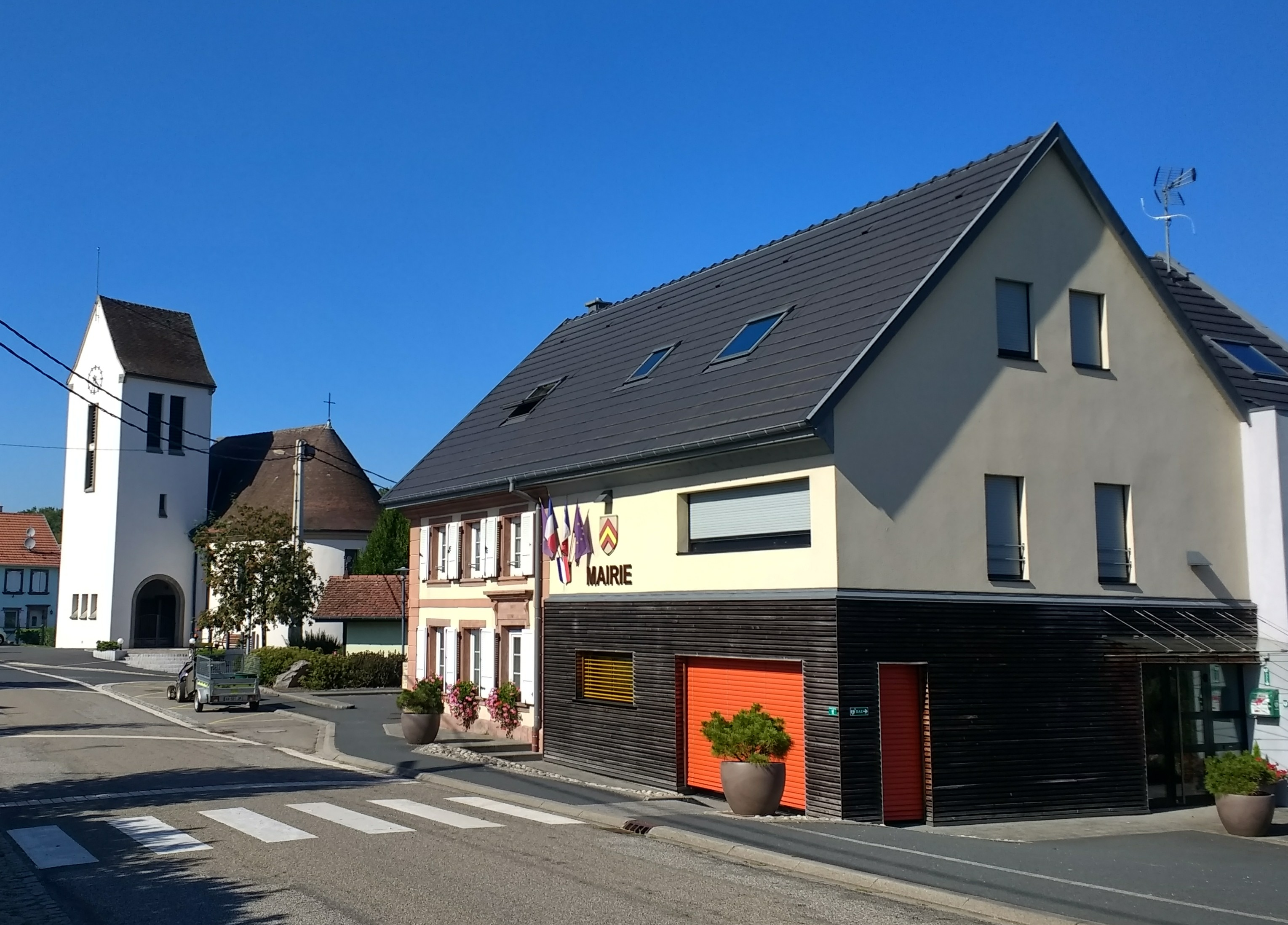
- The church and town hall in Gungwiller

- Coat of arms
- Location of Gungwiller
- Location within France Location within Grand Est
- Coordinates: 48°52′55″N 7°09′31″E
- Country: France
- Region: Grand Est
- Department: Bas-Rhin
- Arrondissement: Saverne
- Canton: Ingwiller

Government
  - Mayor (2020–2026): Jean-Jacques Wursteisen
- Area^{1}: 1.65 km^{2} (0.64 sq mi)
- Highest elevation: 358 m (1,175 ft)
- Lowest elevation: 303 m (994 ft)
- Population (2023): 284
  - Density: 172/km^{2} (446/sq mi)
- Time zone: UTC+01:00 (CET)
  - Summer (DST): UTC+02:00 (CEST)
- INSEE/Postal code: 67178 /67320
- ^{1} French Land Register data, which excludes lakes, ponds, glaciers > 1 km^{2} (0.386 sq mi or 247 acres) and river estuaries.

Gungwiller (German: Gungweiler) is a commune in the Bas-Rhin department in Grand Est in north-eastern France.

== Geography ==
Positioned to the north-west of Phalsbourg on the road towards the Saarland, Gungwiller is a one-street village surrounded by farmland.

== See also ==
- Communes of the Bas-Rhin department
