= Schillersdorf =

- Commune
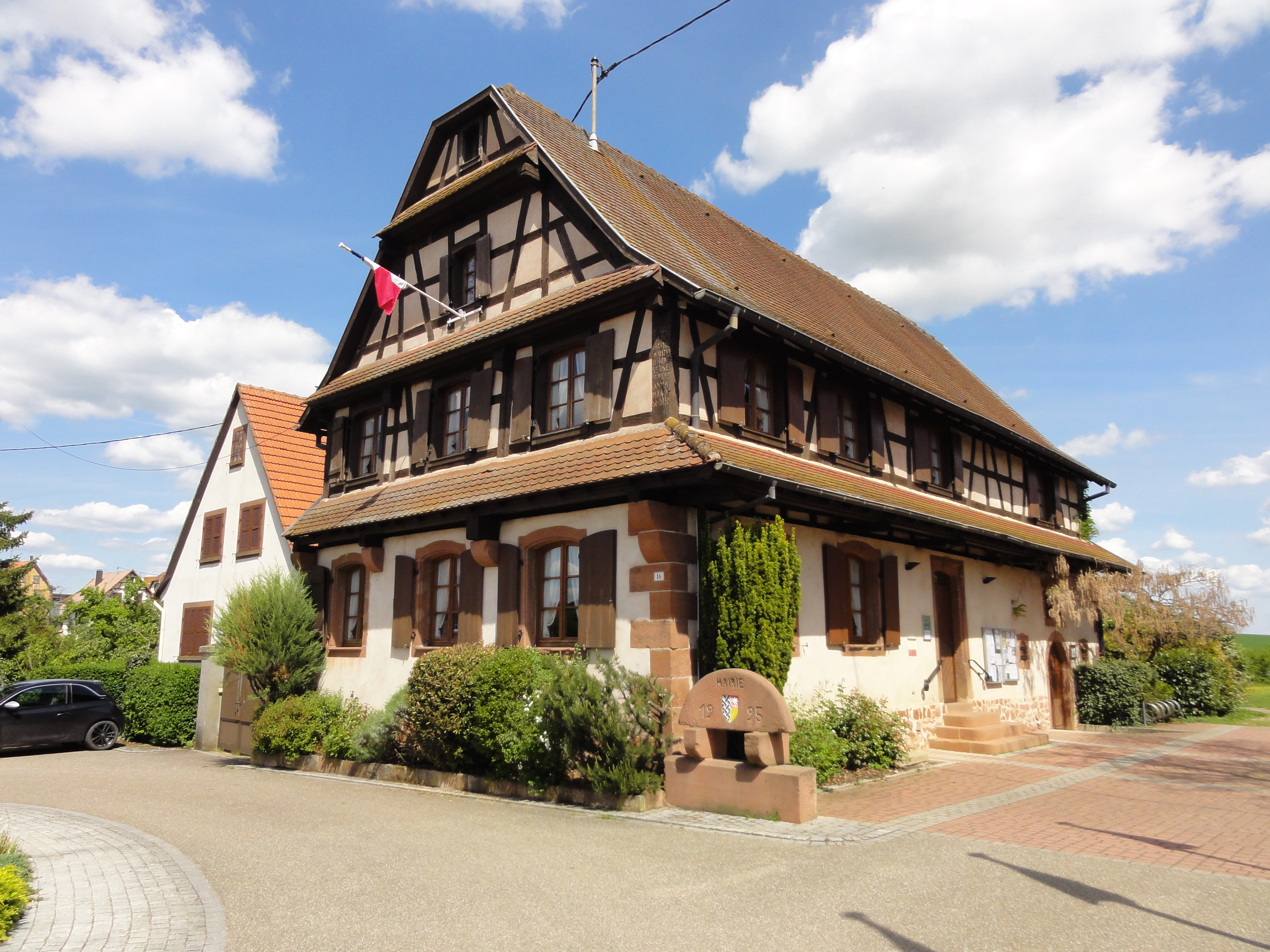
- The town hall in Schillersdorf

- Coat of arms
- Location of Schillersdorf
- Location within France Location within Grand Est
- Coordinates: 48°52′18″N 7°31′32″E
- Country: France
- Region: Grand Est
- Department: Bas-Rhin
- Arrondissement: Saverne
- Canton: Ingwiller

Government
  - Mayor (2020–2026): Marc Krapfenbauer
- Area^{1}: 7.53 km^{2} (2.91 sq mi)
- Highest elevation: 236 m (774 ft)
- Lowest elevation: 178 m (584 ft)
- Population (2023): 407
  - Density: 54.1/km^{2} (140/sq mi)
- Time zone: UTC+01:00 (CET)
  - Summer (DST): UTC+02:00 (CEST)
- INSEE/Postal code: 67446 /67340
- ^{1} French Land Register data, which excludes lakes, ponds, glaciers > 1 km^{2} (0.386 sq mi or 247 acres) and river estuaries.

Schillersdorf is a commune in the Bas-Rhin department in Grand Est in north-eastern France.

== History ==
- 1208: First mention of "Schiltolfesdorf"......
- 1358: Becomes schillersdorf which veient Schilter, which means village on a hill......
- 1400: Construction of the Tower the Bell Tower of fortified ' Church whose base is ours......
- 1405: The Emperor Ruprecht confirms Schillersdorf as stronghold of imperial aus Lichtenberg.......
- 1554: Johann Volk, first pastor, the Protestant parish (introduction of the reform Protestant in County of Hanau-Lichtenberg.) .....
- 1631: The village has 61 subjects due to various conflicts, the paste and the famine......
- 1686: Seal of the Schillersdorf community, representing Saint-Martin......
- 1720: The population of the town is 200 people......
- 1725: First terrier, the first cadastre reported 53 houses.....
- 1759: First clover crop for rotation in Alsace, an initiative deu Pastor Christian Schroeder - promotes agricultural experiments.....
- 1831: cadastre of the municipality.....
- 1851-1854: Construction of the new church with the Bell Tower conservation gold choir and the current Town Hall, primary school, at 20 rue Pasteur Schroeder.....

== See also ==
- Communes of the Bas-Rhin department
