= Baerendorf =

- Commune
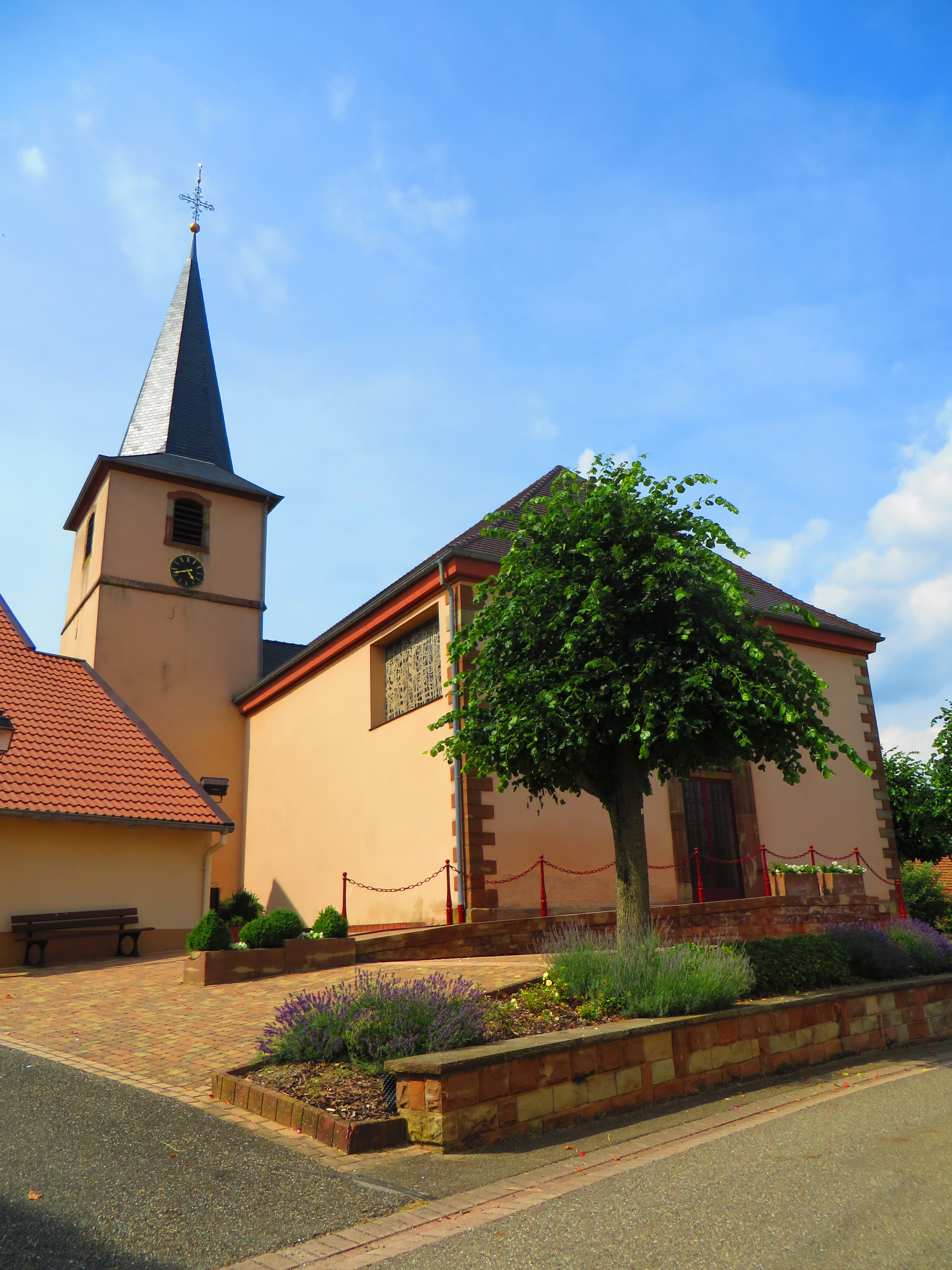
- The church in Baerendorf

- Coat of arms
- Location of Baerendorf
- Location within France Location within Grand Est
- Coordinates: 48°50′21″N 7°05′09″E
- Country: France
- Region: Grand Est
- Department: Bas-Rhin
- Arrondissement: Saverne
- Canton: Ingwiller

Government
  - Mayor (2020–2026): André Klein
- Area^{1}: 7.53 km^{2} (2.91 sq mi)
- Highest elevation: 332 m (1,089 ft)
- Lowest elevation: 237 m (778 ft)
- Population (2023): 304
  - Density: 40.4/km^{2} (105/sq mi)
- Time zone: UTC+01:00 (CET)
  - Summer (DST): UTC+02:00 (CEST)
- INSEE/Postal code: 67017 /67320
- ^{1} French Land Register data, which excludes lakes, ponds, glaciers > 1 km^{2} (0.386 sq mi or 247 acres) and river estuaries.

Baerendorf (French pronunciation: [bɛʁəndɔʁf]; German: Bärendorf) is a commune in the Bas-Rhin department in Grand Est in northeastern France.

== Population ==
Historical population
| Year | Pop. | ±% p.a. |
|---|---|---|
| 1968 | 318 | — |
| 1975 | 313 | −0.23% |
| 1982 | 294 | −0.89% |
| 1990 | 295 | +0.04% |
| 1999 | 305 | +0.37% |
| 2007 | 299 | −0.25% |
| 2012 | 320 | +1.37% |
| 2017 | 302 | −1.15% |
| 2023 | 304 | +0.11% |
Source: INSEE

== See also ==
- Communes of the Bas-Rhin department
