= Ratzwiller =

- Commune
- Coat of arms
- Location of Ratzwiller
- Location within France Location within Grand Est
- Coordinates: 48°57′23″N 7°14′26″E
- Country: France
- Region: Grand Est
- Department: Bas-Rhin
- Arrondissement: Saverne
- Canton: Ingwiller

Government
  - Mayor (2020–2026): Thierry Dehlinger
- Area^{1}: 8.72 km^{2} (3.37 sq mi)
- Highest elevation: 384 m (1,260 ft)
- Lowest elevation: 237 m (778 ft)
- Population (2023): 233
  - Density: 26.7/km^{2} (69.2/sq mi)
- Time zone: UTC+01:00 (CET)
  - Summer (DST): UTC+02:00 (CEST)
- INSEE/Postal code: 67385 /67430
- ^{1} French Land Register data, which excludes lakes, ponds, glaciers > 1 km^{2} (0.386 sq mi or 247 acres) and river estuaries.

Ratzwiller (French pronunciation: [ʁatsvilɛʁ]; German: Ratzweiler) is a commune in the Bas-Rhin department in Grand Est in north-eastern France.

== See also ==
- Communes of the Bas-Rhin department
