= Dossenheim-sur-Zinsel =

- Commune
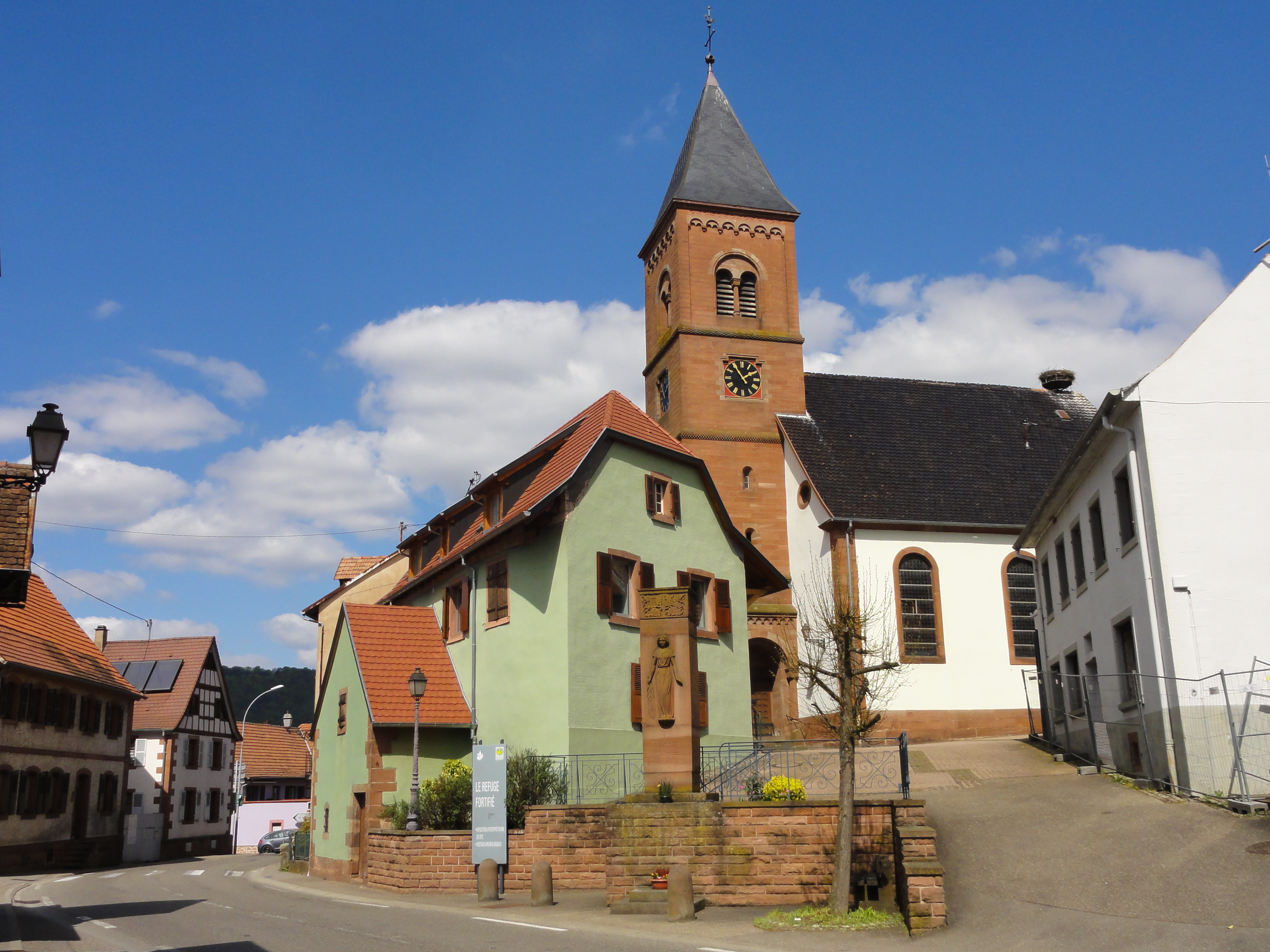
- The church in Dossenheim-sur-Zinsel

- Coat of arms
- Location of Dossenheim-sur-Zinsel
- Location within France Location within Grand Est
- Coordinates: 48°48′19″N 7°24′13″E
- Country: France
- Region: Grand Est
- Department: Bas-Rhin
- Arrondissement: Saverne
- Canton: Ingwiller

Government
  - Mayor (2020–2026): Fabrice Ensminger
- Area^{1}: 17.2 km^{2} (6.6 sq mi)
- Highest elevation: 421 m (1,381 ft)
- Lowest elevation: 176 m (577 ft)
- Population (2023): 1,059
  - Density: 61.6/km^{2} (159/sq mi)
- Time zone: UTC+01:00 (CET)
  - Summer (DST): UTC+02:00 (CEST)
- INSEE/Postal code: 67103 /67330
- ^{1} French Land Register data, which excludes lakes, ponds, glaciers > 1 km^{2} (0.386 sq mi or 247 acres) and river estuaries.

Dossenheim-sur-Zinsel is a commune in the Bas-Rhin department in Grand Est in north-eastern France.

== See also ==
- Communes of the Bas-Rhin department
