= Sparsbach =

- Commune
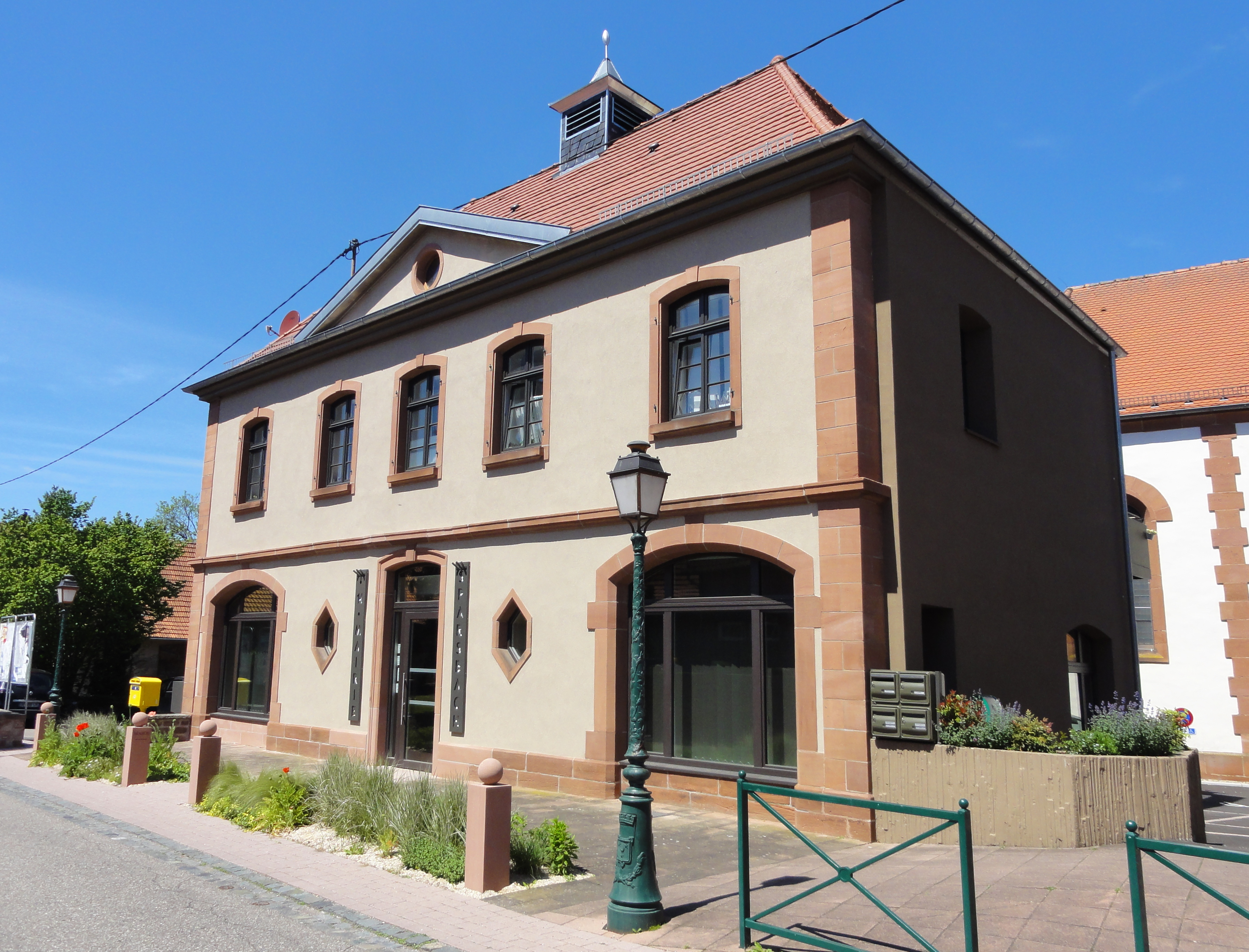
- The town hall in Sparsbach

- Coat of arms
- Location of Sparsbach
- Location within France Location within Grand Est
- Coordinates: 48°52′46″N 7°24′55″E
- Country: France
- Region: Grand Est
- Department: Bas-Rhin
- Arrondissement: Saverne
- Canton: Ingwiller

Government
  - Mayor (2020–2026): Françoise Bourjat
- Area^{1}: 13.58 km^{2} (5.24 sq mi)
- Highest elevation: 387 m (1,270 ft)
- Lowest elevation: 197 m (646 ft)
- Population (2023): 238
  - Density: 17.5/km^{2} (45.4/sq mi)
- Time zone: UTC+01:00 (CET)
  - Summer (DST): UTC+02:00 (CEST)
- INSEE/Postal code: 67475 /67340
- ^{1} French Land Register data, which excludes lakes, ponds, glaciers > 1 km^{2} (0.386 sq mi or 247 acres) and river estuaries.

Sparsbach is a commune in the Bas-Rhin department in Grand Est in north-eastern France.

== See also ==
- Communes of the Bas-Rhin department
