= Ottwiller =

- Commune
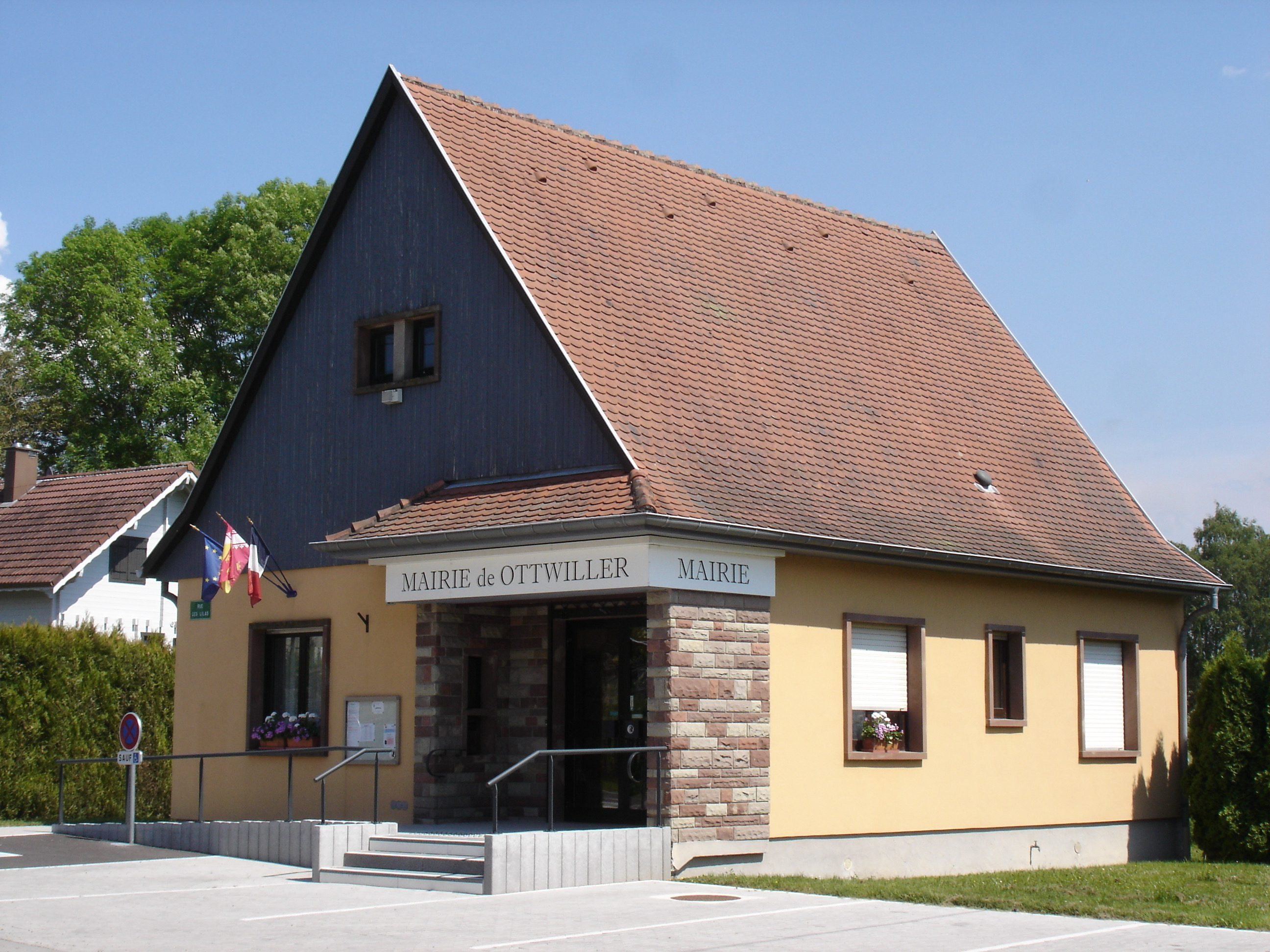
- The town hall in Ottwiller

- Coat of arms
- Location of Ottwiller
- Location within France Location within Grand Est
- Coordinates: 48°51′55″N 7°13′49″E
- Country: France
- Region: Grand Est
- Department: Bas-Rhin
- Arrondissement: Saverne
- Canton: Ingwiller

Government
  - Mayor (2020–2026): Christine Burr
- Area^{1}: 5.09 km^{2} (1.97 sq mi)
- Highest elevation: 372 m (1,220 ft)
- Lowest elevation: 285 m (935 ft)
- Population (2023): 246
  - Density: 48.3/km^{2} (125/sq mi)
- Time zone: UTC+01:00 (CET)
  - Summer (DST): UTC+02:00 (CEST)
- INSEE/Postal code: 67369 /67320
- ^{1} French Land Register data, which excludes lakes, ponds, glaciers > 1 km^{2} (0.386 sq mi or 247 acres) and river estuaries.

Ottwiller (French pronunciation: [ɔtvilɛʁ]; German: Ottweiler) is a commune in the Bas-Rhin department in Grand Est in north-eastern France.

== See also ==
- Communes of the Bas-Rhin department
