= Petersbach =

- Commune
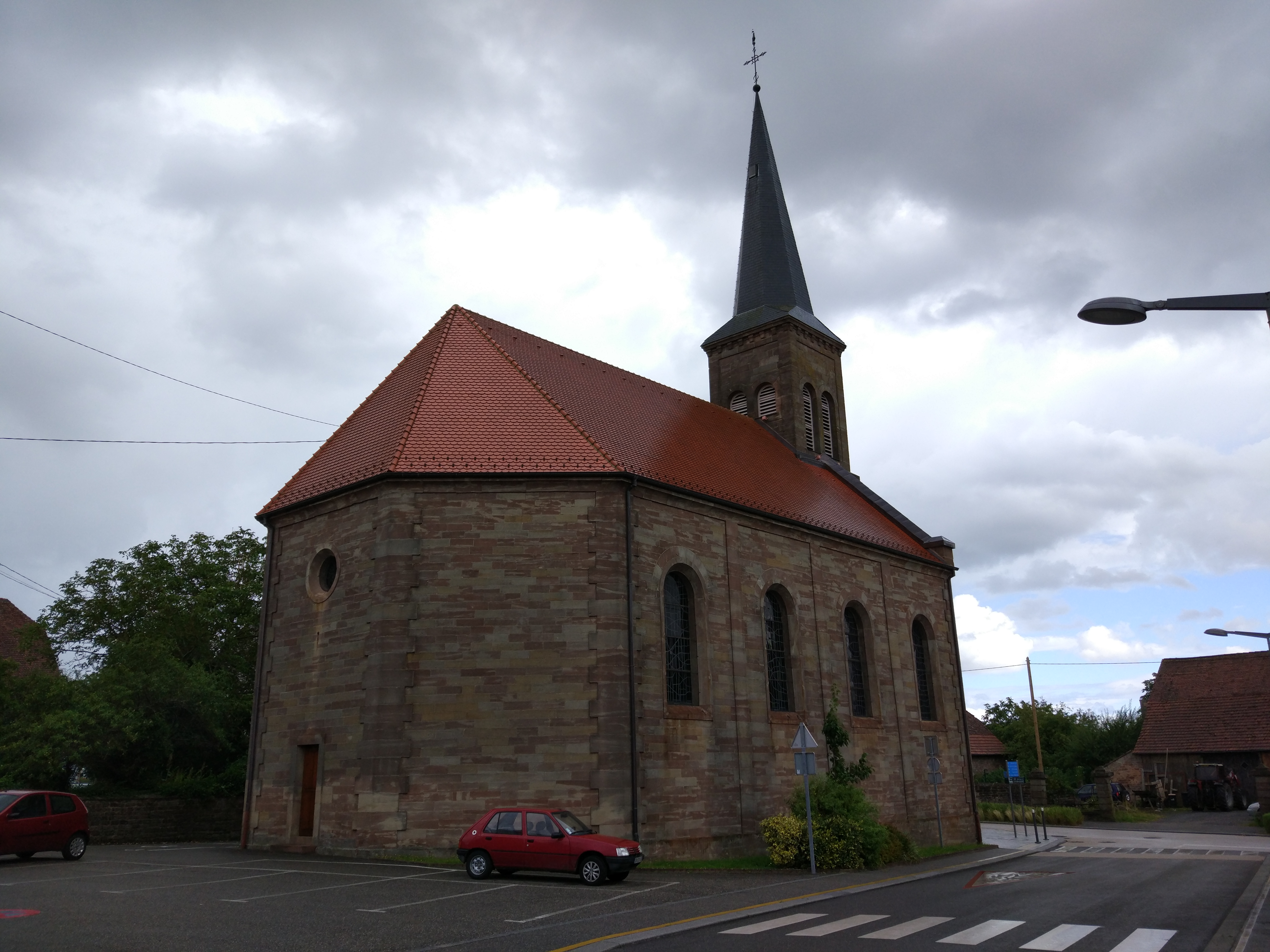
- The Protestant church in Petersbach

- Coat of arms
- Location of Petersbach
- Location within France Location within Grand Est
- Coordinates: 48°52′18″N 7°16′05″E
- Country: France
- Region: Grand Est
- Department: Bas-Rhin
- Arrondissement: Saverne
- Canton: Ingwiller

Government
  - Mayor (2020–2026): Christian Fauth
- Area^{1}: 8.88 km^{2} (3.43 sq mi)
- Highest elevation: 383 m (1,257 ft)
- Lowest elevation: 257 m (843 ft)
- Population (2023): 664
  - Density: 74.8/km^{2} (194/sq mi)
- Time zone: UTC+01:00 (CET)
  - Summer (DST): UTC+02:00 (CEST)
- INSEE/Postal code: 67370 /67290
- ^{1} French Land Register data, which excludes lakes, ponds, glaciers > 1 km^{2} (0.386 sq mi or 247 acres) and river estuaries.

Petersbach is a commune in the Bas-Rhin department in Grand Est in north-eastern France.

Peteresbach is within the Northern Vosges Regional Nature Park (French: Parc naturel régional des Vosges du Nord) that lies in the northern foothills of the Vosges Mountains.

== Industry/Economy ==
At the eastern end of the town is the headquarters and major plant for fr:Grands Chais de France, a major French wine and spirit maker and exporter. It produces over 1m bottles of wine annually.

== Culture ==
The local cultural ties to Germany are strong, including the use of a Rhenish Franconian dialect.

== See also ==
- Communes of the Bas-Rhin department
