= Weislingen =

- Commune
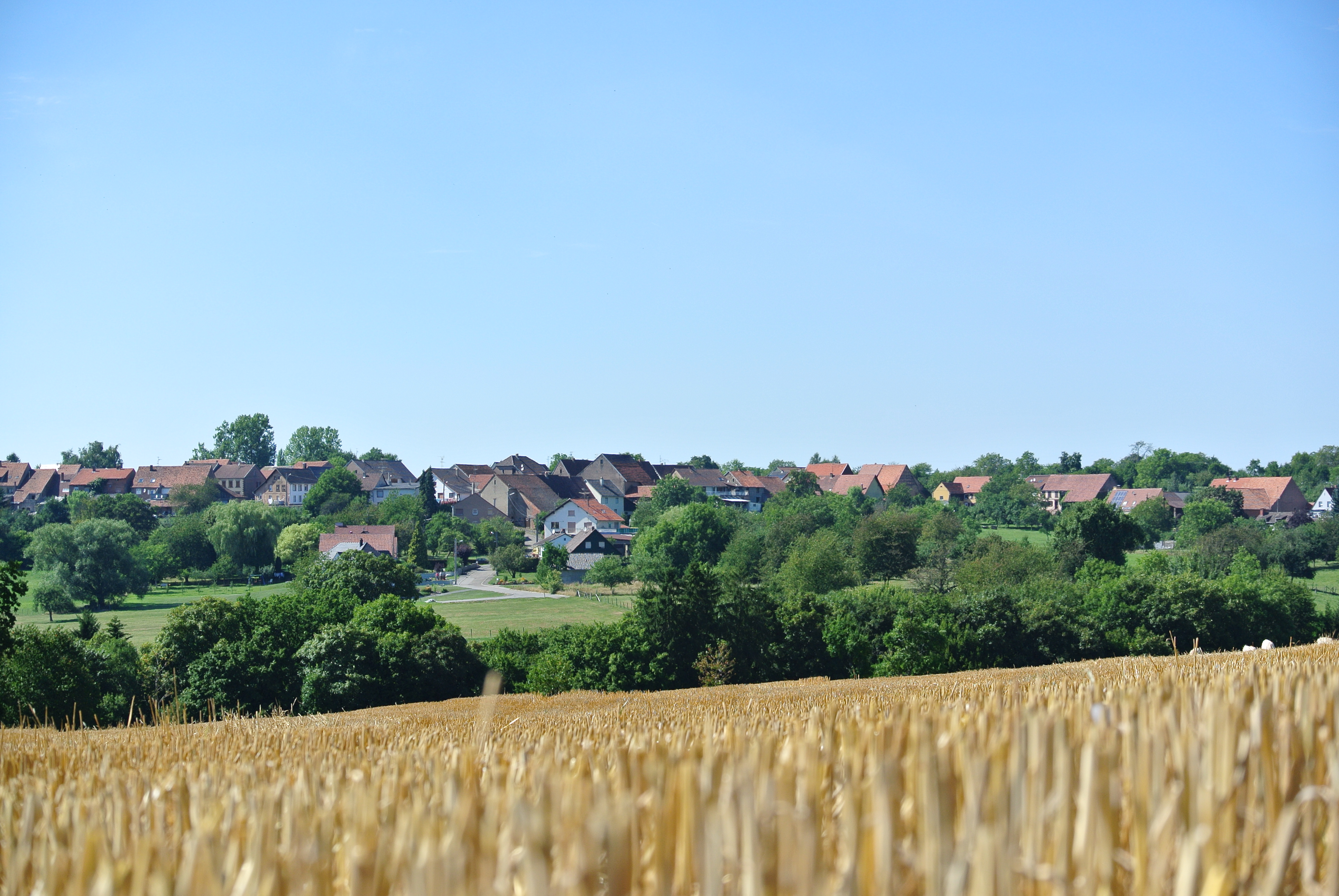
- A general view of Weislingen

- Coat of arms
- Location of Weislingen
- Location within France Location within Grand Est
- Coordinates: 48°55′12″N 7°15′09″E
- Country: France
- Region: Grand Est
- Department: Bas-Rhin
- Arrondissement: Saverne
- Canton: Ingwiller
- Intercommunality: Alsace Bossue

Government
  - Mayor (2020–2026): Marc Burger
- Area^{1}: 7.01 km^{2} (2.71 sq mi)
- Elevation: 330 m (1,080 ft)
- Highest elevation: 374 m (1,227 ft)
- Lowest elevation: 245 m (804 ft)
- Population (2023): 525
  - Density: 74.9/km^{2} (194/sq mi)
- Time zone: UTC+01:00 (CET)
  - Summer (DST): UTC+02:00 (CEST)
- INSEE/Postal code: 67522 /67290
- ^{1} French Land Register data, which excludes lakes, ponds, glaciers > 1 km^{2} (0.386 sq mi or 247 acres) and river estuaries.

Weislingen (French pronunciation: [vaisliŋ(ɡ)ən]) is a commune in the Bas-Rhin department in Grand Est in north-eastern France.

== Population ==
Historical population
Year	Pop.	±% p.a.
1968	652	—
1975	633	−0.42%
1982	605	−0.64%
1990	534	−1.55%
1999	582	+0.96%
2007	566	−0.35%
2012	556	−0.36%
2017	535	−0.77%
2023	525	−0.31%
Source: INSEE

== See also ==
- Communes of the Bas-Rhin department
