= Kirrberg, Bas-Rhin =

Kirrberg
- Commune
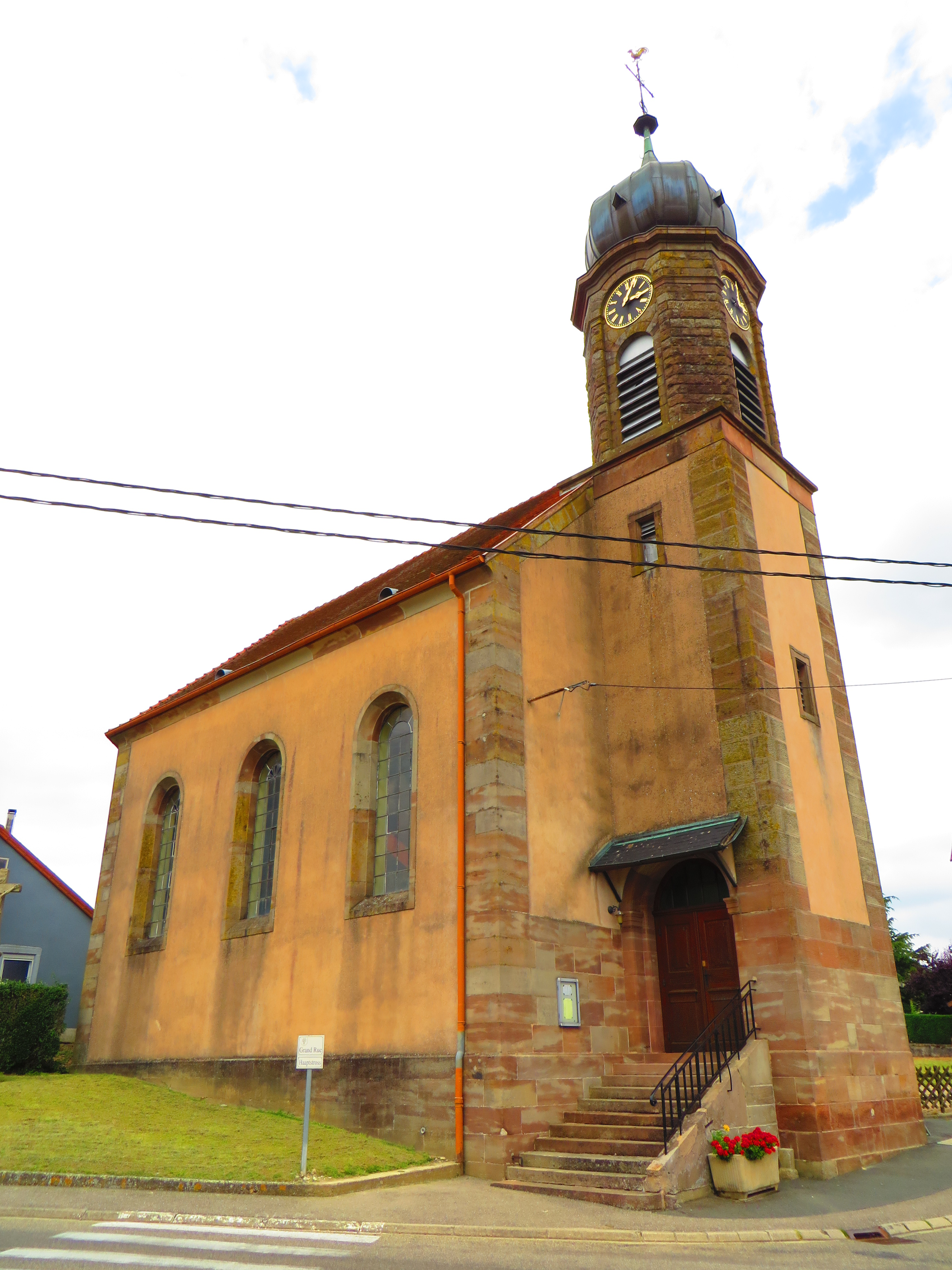
- The Lutheran church in Kirrberg

- Coat of arms
- Location of Kirrberg
- Location within France Location within Grand Est
- Coordinates: 48°49′23″N 7°03′54″E
- Country: France
- Region: Grand Est
- Department: Bas-Rhin
- Arrondissement: Saverne
- Canton: Ingwiller

Government
  - Mayor (2020–2026): Jean-Marie Blaser
- Area^{1}: 6.35 km^{2} (2.45 sq mi)
- Highest elevation: 332 m (1,089 ft)
- Lowest elevation: 235 m (771 ft)
- Population (2023): 167
  - Density: 26.3/km^{2} (68.1/sq mi)
- Time zone: UTC+01:00 (CET)
  - Summer (DST): UTC+02:00 (CEST)
- INSEE/Postal code: 67241 /67320
- ^{1} French Land Register data, which excludes lakes, ponds, glaciers > 1 km^{2} (0.386 sq mi or 247 acres) and river estuaries.

Kirrberg (French pronunciation: [kiʁbɛʁɡ]) is a commune in the northwest of the Bas-Rhin department in Grand Est in north-eastern France. It lies 18 kilometres (11 mi) to the west of Phalsbourg.

== History ==
The earliest surviving record, naming the village as Villa Teurino, dates from 512. The first appearance of a precursor to the present name occurs in 1501 with the name Kirpberg.

During the Thirty Years' War the village was almost entirely destroyed by fire.

== See also ==
- Communes of the Bas-Rhin department
