= Alteckendorf =

Alteckendorf Àltackedorf
- Commune
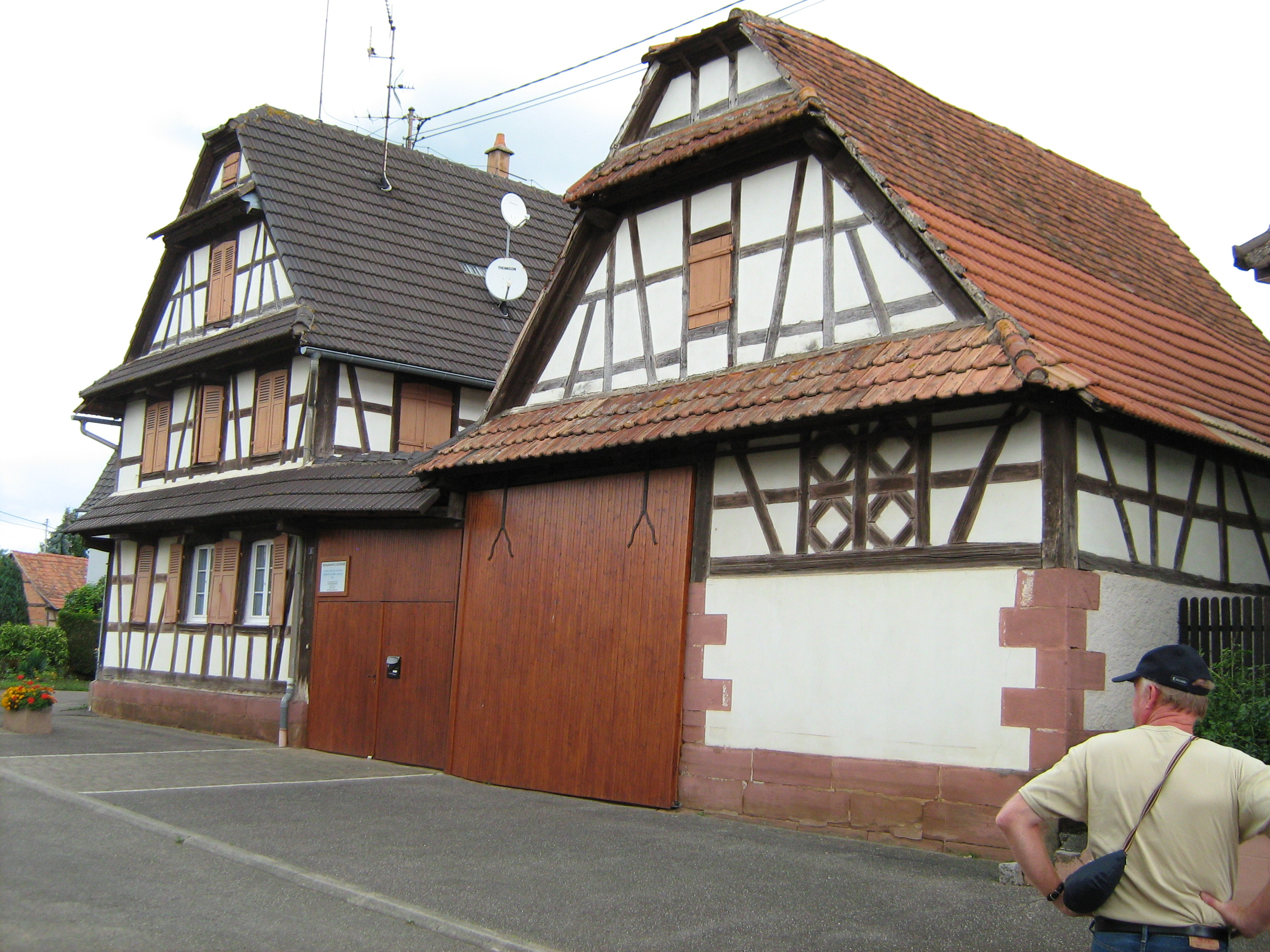
- Half-timbered Farmhouse

- Coat of arms
- Location of Alteckendorf
- Location within France Location within Grand Est
- Coordinates: 48°47′37″N 7°35′43″E
- Country: France
- Region: Grand Est
- Department: Bas-Rhin
- Arrondissement: Saverne
- Canton: Bouxwiller
- Intercommunality: Pays de la Zorn

Government
  - Mayor (2020–2026): Alain Hipp
- Area^{1}: 5.72 km^{2} (2.21 sq mi)
- Highest elevation: 265 m (869 ft)
- Lowest elevation: 167 m (548 ft)
- Population (2023): 857
  - Density: 150/km^{2} (388/sq mi)
- Time zone: UTC+01:00 (CET)
  - Summer (DST): UTC+02:00 (CEST)
- INSEE/Postal code: 67005 /67270
- ^{1} French Land Register data, which excludes lakes, ponds, glaciers > 1 km^{2} (0.386 sq mi or 247 acres) and river estuaries.

Alteckendorf (French pronunciation: [altɛkəndɔrf]; sometimes spelled Alt Eckendorf; Alsatian: Àltackedorf) is a commune in the Bas-Rhin department in the Grand Est region of northeastern France.

== Geography ==
Alteckendorf is about 30 km north-west of Strasbourg and 20 km east of Saverne. Covering an area of 572 hectares, the commune is located on the plain of Alsace and more specifically in the area of some loess hills behind Kochersberg and between the Vosges Mountains and Germany. The town is located 177 metres above sea level and is watered by the Landgraben stream, a tributary of the Zorn. It is surrounded by the Koppenberg (256 metres), Englischberg (288 metres), and Schyrberg (250 metres) hills. To the north of the town is the Alteckendorf forest.

The Sarreguemines-Strasbourg railway runs through the commune with a station on the south-east edge of the village.

Neighbouring localities within a radius of 5 kilometres include Minversheim, Ettendorf, Huttendorf, Ringendorf, Lixhausen, Bossendorf, Hochfelden and Schwindratzheim.

Alteckendorf is approximately an hour by car from Strasbourg and is near the famous militarily historical town of Haguenau.

=== Communications ===
==== Road network ====
The entire road network (local roads, streets and local roads) occupy 9 hectares out of the 572 hectares of the commune. (Note: p. 63, Communal Notice) The town is crossed from west to east (Main Street) by the D69 which connects Kirrwiller to Mommenheim. This road crosses the D25 at Altdorf linking Ettendorf to Hochfelden. This latter approach road is extended by several county roads. The nearest entrance to the Autoroute de L'Est (A4 autoroute) is via the D32 through the toll-gate at Schwindratzheim. There is parking there for car-pooling.

==== Public transport ====
The Sarreguemines–Strasbourg railway line has passed through the commune since 1895 and occupies a total of ten hectares. The railway station located at Eckendorf is now disused. This building was purchased by the municipality in 1982 and transformed in 1984 into a multipurpose hall. (Note: p. 63, Elements of Comfort) Now the nearest SNCF station is at Mommenheim accessible from Alteckendorf by a bus connection on the TER Grand Est service from Buswiller to Mommenheim.

School buses to the college at Hochfelden and to the Bouxwiller High School are available during school terms.

=== Climate ===
The type of climate prevailing in Alteckendorf is a degraded oceanic climate with a relatively large amplitude of temperature. Thus snowfall is fairly common in winter while some summer days can be hot and stuffy. Situated between two mountain ranges (the Vosges and the Black Forest) the village has little exposure to wind. Similarly, rainfall is relatively scarce and irregular compared to other French regions, with natural protection against the prevailing westerly winds from the Vosges (foehn effect). The town is often subject to violent storms in spring and summer. The most devastating occurred on 18 and 30 May 2008 when floods and mudslides invaded homes.

=== Hydrology ===
The communal territory of Alteckendorf is not crossed by streams of significant importance. There however two streams: the Minversheimerbach and Schweingraben. The Minversheimerbach has its source in the north in the commune of Buswiller. It flows south through Ettendorf then through Alteckendorf and Minversheim. At Mommenheim, this modest stream empties into the river Zorn.

The Schweingraben or Schweinbachgraben (in English: "the pigs' stream") is a river that marks part of the eastern border of Alteckendorf. This stream has its source north of the village in the territory of Grassendorf. It flows south to join the Minversheimerbach southwest of Minversheim.

=== Vegetation ===
The entire commune has been dedicated to agriculture for many centuries. The first written references date back to the 8th century when the abbey of Wissembourg declared themselves the owners of Alteckendorf. The landscape is entirely shaped by the hand of man and there is little room for wilderness. The oldest map describing the territory dates back to the year 1760. Of a total of 1051.06 arpents, 635.70 arpents are devoted to arable land, 125.72 arpents of meadows, 118.78 arpents of pastures, 84.40 arpents of vineyards, 48.20 arpents of forest, and 38.26 arpents of orchards and houses.

== Urbanism, a merger of two village communities ==
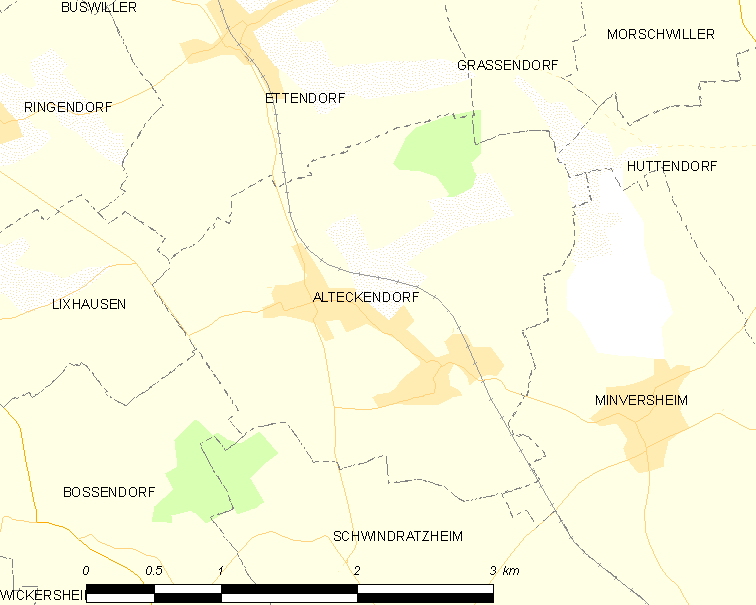

=== Toponymy ===
The present village of Alteckendorf is the result of the merger of two distinct communities. The village of Eckendorf is mentioned in the year 742 under the name Echanhaime.

Subsequently, the name was again mentioned in 744 with various spellings such as: Ecchenheim (744), Ecchenheimomarca (in 764 and 792), and Ecchenthorf, Ekkendorf, Ekindorf. (Note: p. 12. Es waren zwei Dörfer (German)) The Abbey of Wissembourg was listed as the landowner from 752 to 787. In 1120, the monastery at Mauermünster-Sindelsberg was named as the landowner. In 1146 it was recorded that the knight Simon de Frundsberg ceded his possessions at Ekindork for "16½ lötig Silberstücke" to the Abbey of Stürzelbronn. In 1194, the monastery at Neuburg was the landowner of Eckendorf. (Note: idem)

Altdorf does not appear until later in history with a completely different name: perhaps Mazonivilare, because it is recorded in a document of 752 that Sigfrid, son of Sigismund gave up his property of "Villa Ecchenheimo et Mazonivilare". No mention of the village occurs later; it was undoubtedly destroyed during a war and when the inhabitants returned they named the place Altdorf (old village). (Note: p. 12. Es waren zwei Dörfer) The name Altdorf does not appear until 1331.

The name Oberaltdorf was also used to distinguish this village from the nearby hamlet of Niederaltdorf.

The name Eckendorf is formed from Eck(e) meaning "corner" or "locality" followed by the appellative Dorf meaning "village" that is to say "local village" according to Ernest Negro. The name of the hamlet of Oberaltdorf can be translated as "high old village". The two villages were united in 1777 and called Alt und Eckendorf then throughout the 19th century Alt-Eckendorf and finally since the beginning of the 20th century Alteckendorf.

Even today two localities on the cadastral map located one kilometre north of Eckendorf bear the names Weilerhöltzel and Weilerberg. Weiler is the German word for "hamlet" (in German the spelling is willer) and comes from the Latin word villare meaning "farm" derived from villa rustica. It must be assumed that these places once existed although now deserted and forgotten.

The year 1777 is generally advanced as that of the union of the two villages. The parish chronicle reports that, to mark the event, a celebration was held midway between the two locations. This merger however was part of a broader movement both before and after that date so rather than a union it was more a gradual process of fusion.

=== History of the fusion process ===
Alteckendorf was once part of the Bailiwick of Pfaffenhoffen which reported to the County of Hanau-Lichtenberg. It was created in 1777 by the merger of the Eckendorf village community with that of the neighbouring hamlet of Oberaltdorf (or Altdorf). The two villages became French in 1680, when their lord, the Count of Hanau-Lichtenberg, submitted to the authority of Louis XIV at the expense of the Holy Roman Empire. Like the rest of Alsace, the village again became German between 1871 and 1918 and between 1940 and 1944.

Originally affiliated to the Parish of Minversheim, in 1474 Eckendorf and Altdorf formed an independent parish, first Catholic then Lutheran from 1545. In 1577 both villages were assigned a common seal. This seal showed Saint Martin, patron saint of the chapel of Altdorf. This unique seal shows that Eckendorf and Altdorf were already linked administratively and the Lord of Hanau-Lichtenberg was represented in the two villages with a single Schultheiß, the custodian of the seal of the two communities. The Schultheiß exercised judicial authority in the Gericht, a village court consisting of seven Schoeffen (aldermen). The sentences and fines were imposed based on the Dorfordnung, village regulations which were at first an oral then a written codification of customs and usage from the Middle Ages.

In 1662 a unique terrier was written which listed all the landowners of the two villages. This was the Oberalt und Eckendorffer Generalbannerneuerungsprotocoll established by the Schultheiß Dieboldthansen Dieboldt with five aldermen of the village court. This paper demonstrates that both villages had only one communal territory at least a century before the union of 1777.

After the annexation of Alsace to France by Louis XIV a Protestant could not be the Schultheiß. Also within the Lutheran county of Hanau-Lichtenberg, the Schultheißs were replaced by Stabhalter which was simply a name change. From 19 March 1769 to 31 March 1790 this post was held by Johann Richert at Alteckendorf. This Stabhalter was in charge eight years before the celebration of the union of 1777 and for the next thirteen years. As an aside it can be argued that the Napoleonic prefectural authority did continue the local political career of Stabhalter Johann Richert by naming him Mayor of Alteckendorf from 1800 to 1813.

What then is the significance of the year 1777? Before the Revolution the rural population of Alsace was divided roughly into two categories: Schirmer (peasants) and Bürger (bourgeois). Each year, the citizens of Eckendorf elected a Bürgermeister (chief bourgeois) responsible for financing the bourgeois community and for taxes that the latter had to pay. The citizens of Altdorf did the same. It was this function that was merged in 1777. Before that date and since time immemorial the two village communities each had their own Bürgermeister even though they had a single village court headed by a Schultheiß from one of these two bourgeois communities appointed by the Lord of the manor.

=== The geographical merger ===
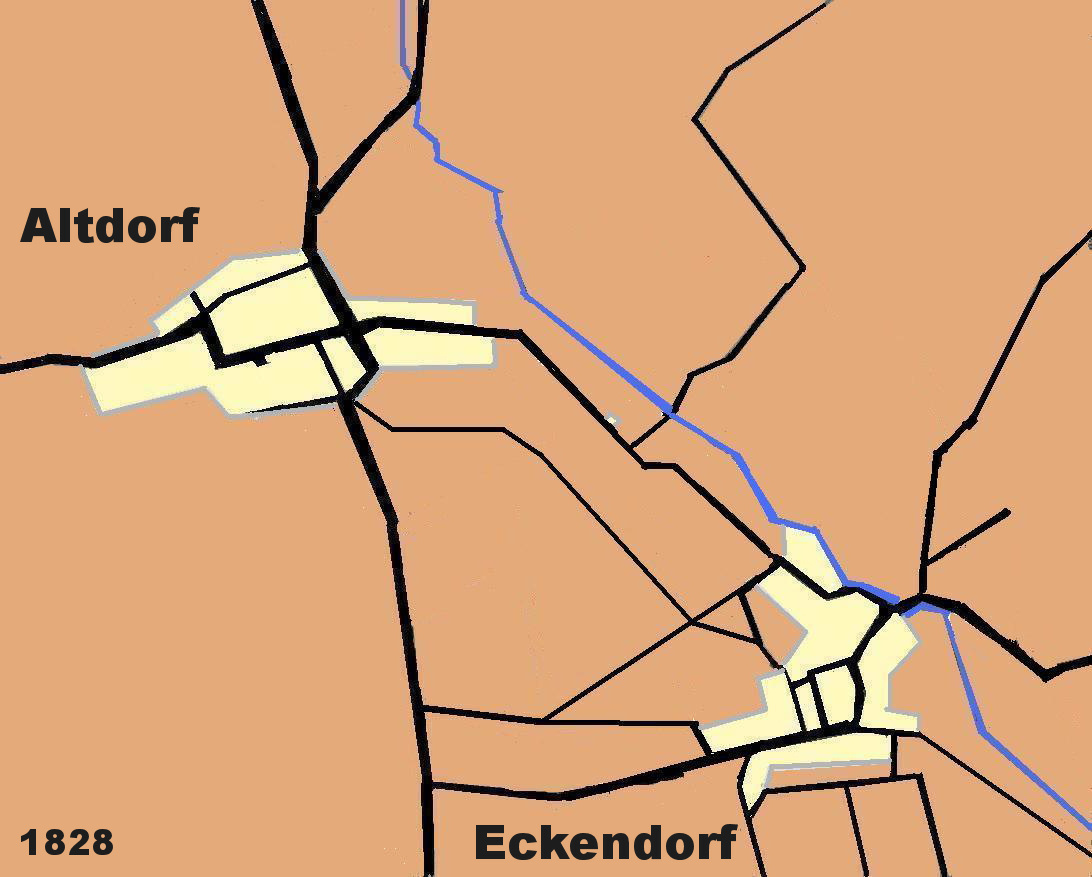
Alteckendorf in 1760 and 1828

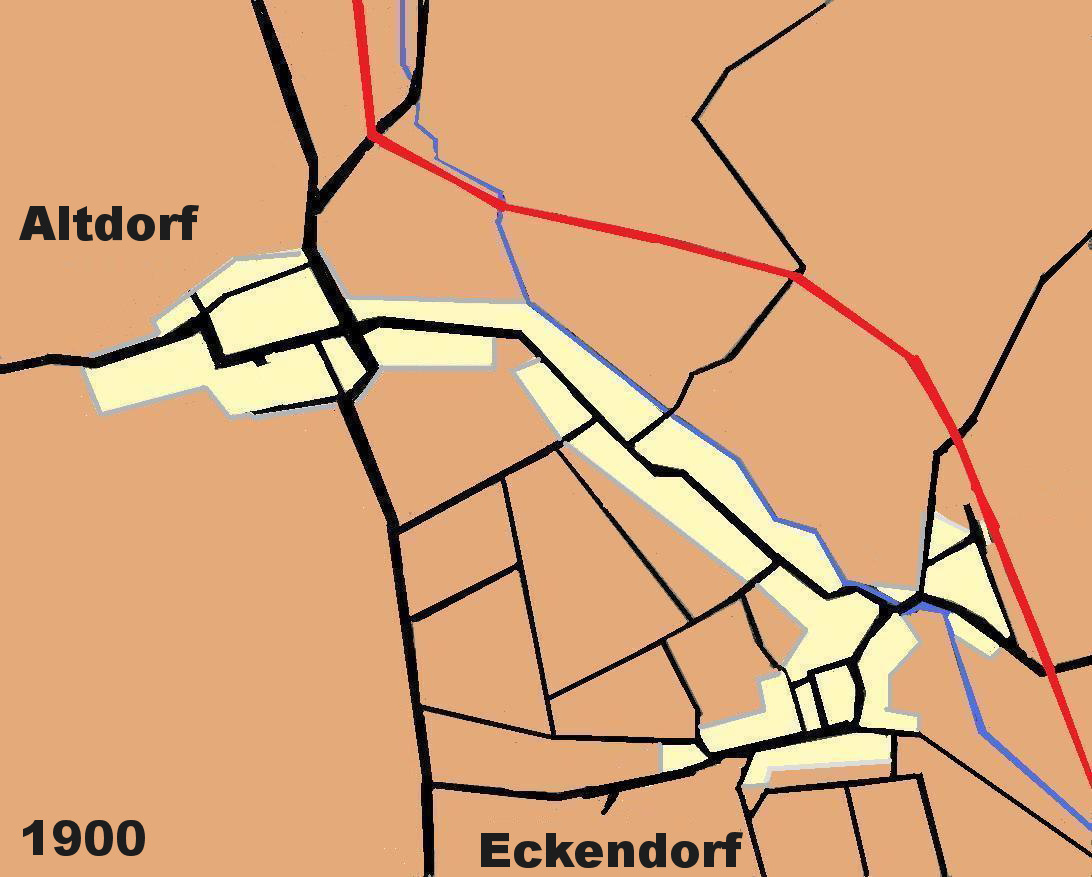
Alteckendorf in 1900

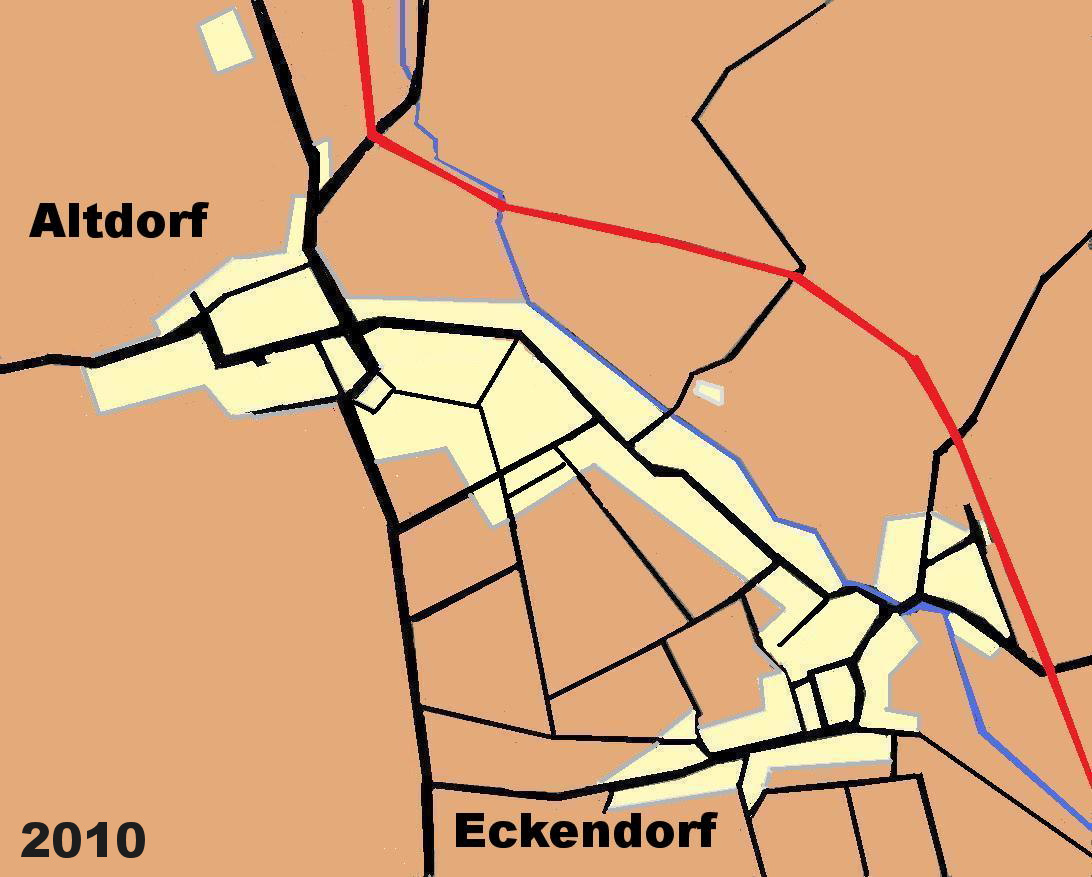
Alteckendorf in 2010

The merger of the two communities endorsed in the year 1777 was not challenged in 1790 when the administrative reorganization of the Revolution took place. The two villages remained linked in a single new municipality. However, the cadastral plan of 1828, like its preceding land plan in 1760, still showed two distinct villages. Eckendorf is separated from Altdorf by meadows but localities are connected by a path then called the Laubweg.

==== The Laubweg Path ====
The German word Laubweg is composed of the word Weg meaning "path" and the word Laub which means "foliage", die Laube translates as "the tree". The Laubweg refers to the pre-revolutionary concept of village justice mentioned above. The court of Gericht led by the Schultheiß sat, in the 14th and 15th centuries, in a house open to all the winds to ensure publicity of its discussions. This house called die Laube was better than the public square located in the shade of the village linden trees which was used previously for debates. Today, the old building of the former town hall of Bischwiller is called die Laub. The plan of the territory of Alteckendorf in 1760 indicated a building erected midway between the two towns not far from the current Rue Mercier (the ancient Herrenweg) the path of the Lords leading to Pfaffenhoffen, the chief town of the Bailiwick on which Alteckendorf depended. There can be seen the building of the Laub Alteckendorf. The cadastral map of 1828 shows construction in the same place. It is unclear if this is the same building.

==== The end of duplicate communal buildings ====
If the cadastral map of 1828 does not provide certainty as to the existence or not of Laub Alteckendorf at that date, it does nevertheless indicate that the commune of Alteckendorf had several duplicate buildings in Eckendorf and Altdorf. Two churches, two schools and two police stations. Although the two churches still exist in 2010, in 1835 other buildings were grouped into a single building. One school for 150 students, a house for the teacher, the offices of the Town Hall and the police. This construction, which was razed in 1999 to make way for a more modern school, was at the supposed site of the old Laub.

The construction of the single school/town hall was the real starting point for the construction of other buildings along the Laubweg. At the beginning of the 20th century this intermediate zone was completely occupied by farms of varying size. During the annexation of Alsace-Lorraine by Imperial Germany, the Laubweg took the names of Dorfgasse or Hauptstrasse. It is this last name that continues today through its translations to French (Rue Principal) and Alsatian (Hauptstross).

After the Second World War the mayor, for the sake of economy, suggested an idea to raze the two churches which were the property of the commune, and replace them by a single building. This proposal was quickly aborted.

=== The habitat ===
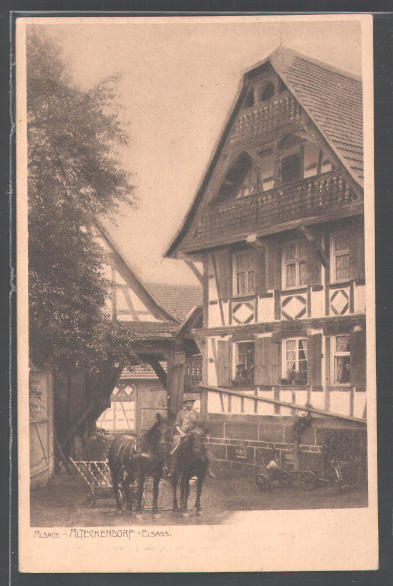
The building of the "Buredewels" farm built in 1809 in Altdorf and photographed one hundred years later.

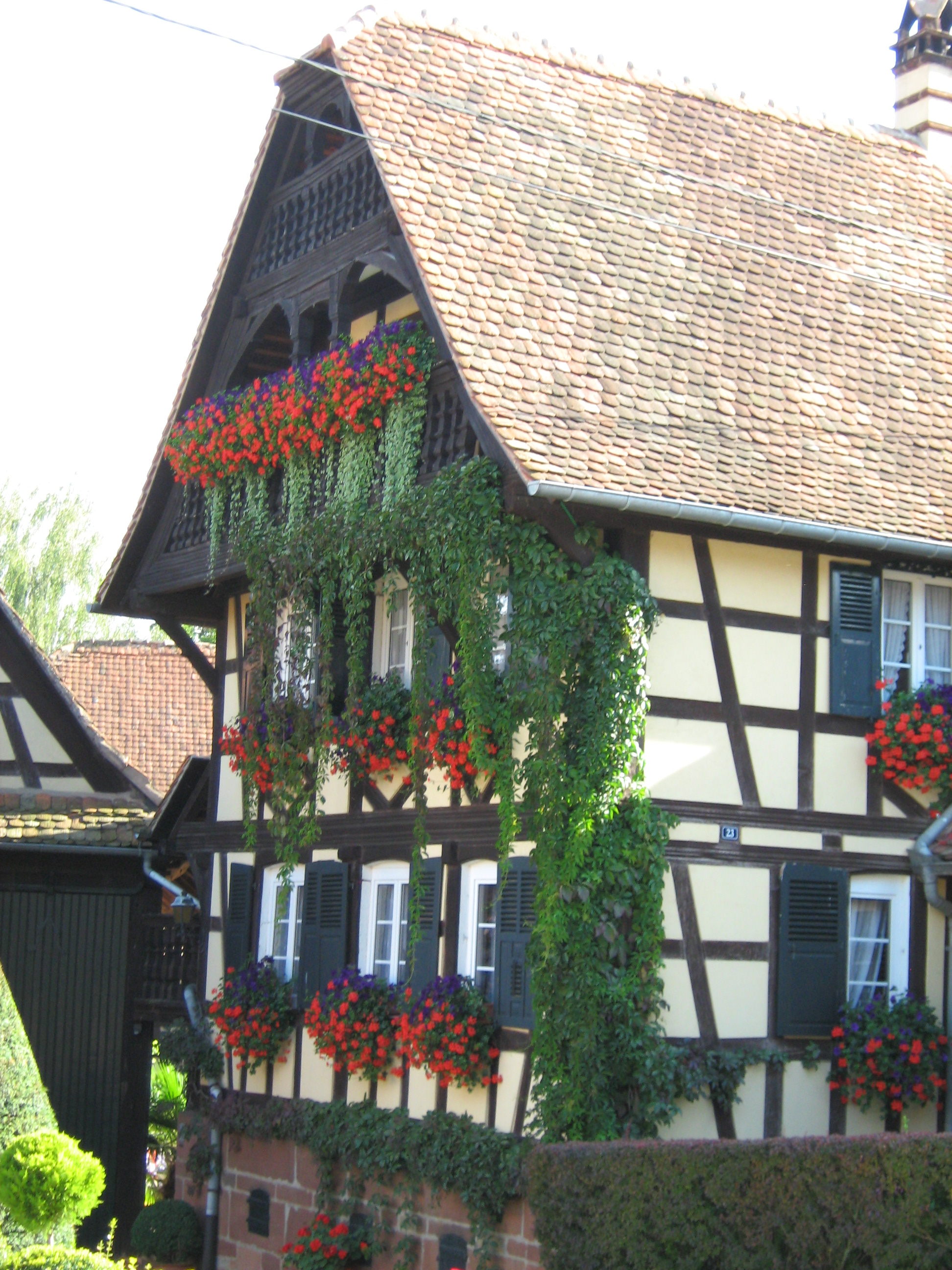
The house today

The oldest farms are the half-timbered houses that were built in the traditional Alsatian architectural style. The frame of the building is wooden with a filling of mud, the foundations being stone. These mixed farms all have more or less the same basic plan. They are composed of several buildings around a courtyard. The main house, with or without a first floor, is oriented towards the street (with rare exceptions). On the other side of the court are the stables and cowsheds with a barn in the back. The yard is separated from the street by a large gate. Visible from the street are the names of the builders with the date of construction on the buildings or the gates. No construction dates back before the 18th century. Farms rebuilt at the beginning of the 19th century are all within Eckendorf and Oberaltdorf. Those built in the middle of the 19th and beginning of the 20th centuries are located along the main street. From the last third of the 19th century the builders gradually abandoned wood and mud in favour of baked bricks, the traditional plan, however, was preserved.

In 1999 there were 265 lodgings but ten were vacant and three were second homes; 80% were houses and 14% were apartments; 88.1% are 4 rooms or more and 77% are owner-occupied. Between 2008 and 2010 two new districts were created. These subdivisions called Clos Saint Georges in Eckendorf and les Vergers in Altdorf consist of forty dwellings. The municipality, having bought in 2009 two former farms at Eckendorf next to the subdivision of Clos Saint Georges, decided to turn them into a set of eight rental lodgings with a multi-service store.

== History ==
=== Middle Ages and Renaissance ===
Before 744 the two villages were imperial possessions. In the 18th Century they were in the possession of Landgraf von Werd in his capacity as the Abbot of the fief of Wissembourg. The first mention of a church in the two villages was in 1313 when Rudolf von Hüttendorf, son of Burckhard, knight of Hüttendorf was installed as rector of the church.

==== Possession of the lords of Lichtenberg ====
In the year 1331, the two villages were fiefs of Ludwig von Onovilsheim. The following year, in 1332, they came as a legacy to Hanemann II and to Ludemann III, both Lords of Lichtenberg. After this succession the two squires received with Brumath and the Castle of Grand Arnsberg a series of villages including Altdorf and Eckendorf. This possession was shared between the children of Ludemann III. Simon received among others Altdorf and Eckendorf. (Note: p. 13 Lichtenbergisches Gut)

After the Lords of Lichtenberg had entered into possession of the two villages, they settled in the Eckendorf castle, a feudal lordship that took the name Eckendorf. From 1334 there are the names of Hans von Eckendorf but also Blass, Fritsch, Ludwig, and Götze. This last was Priest and Canon in Saint-Étienne of Strasbourg in 1365. In 1356 Knight Ludwig von Eckendorf took an oath of citizenship in Strasbourg. In 1384 Ludwig received Lord Ottemann at Ochsenstein, at the fiefs of Furchhausen, Wolschheim, Dettwiller, Hegeney, and Hochfelden. On 12 September 1390 Ludwig von Eckendorf participated in a tournament at Strasbourg. In the middle of the 14th century the nobles of Eckendorf lived in Strasbourg. (Note: p. 13 Lichtenbergisches Gut and p. 91 The Noble family of Eckendorf (German))

In the year 1365 Knight Hans Zuckmantel the elder was confirmed in his fief at Eckendorf. He succeeded Ludwig von Eckendorf and Otto von Hochfelden, son of Ottemann. These last possessed between them the castle of Eckendorf and the rights to tithe at Eckendorf. Hans Zuckmantel was originally from Silesia. He was a knight in the castle of Brumath with the nobles of Weitersheim with whom he shared arms. Hans Zuckmantel, knight of Brumath, son of Knight Wilhelm obtained, by marrying the daughter of the Knight Nicklaus von Grostein suzerainty over the village of Wintzenheim – another fief of Lichtenberg. (Note: p. 92 The Noble Family of Eckendorf (German))

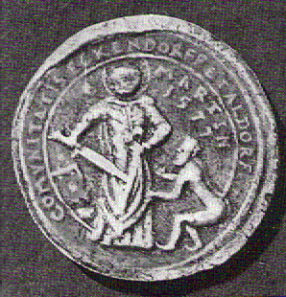
1577 Seal of Altdorf and Eckendorf communities

Coat of Arms currently used by the municipality

Simplified coat of arms but not used

In 1577, the village communities of Eckendorff and Aldorff were granted a seal with the description: Sankt Martin zu fuss, seinen Mantel teilend, mit dem Armen nackt am Rande of Weges sitzend eine zur Seite, Kirchlein und mit Augen Gottes auf einem Hügel zur anderen Seite das ganze in Gold auf blauem Grund. This seal is currently held by the Museum of Bouxwiller.

The Armorial of Louis XIV, took back the seal and revealed a new seal, in heraldic language, for the communities and Oberaltorff Exquendorff: Azure, Saint Martin cutting his cloak in half to give to a pauper sitting sinister, the saint to dexter of a pile of a church set on a hill, all Or.

However, the heraldic commission created by the prefect of the Bas-Rhin in 1946 changed this blazon by simplifying it to: Or, the yoke of Saint Martin Azure. However, the municipality was not aware of this work and used a shield representing an apple upside down until 1990. Learning of the existence of the 1577 seal, they decided to adopt a design inspired by that shield. The simplified shield created by the heraldic commission was never used by the municipality.

=== The horrors of the Thirty Years' War ===
From 1618 to 1648 the Thirty Years' War ravaged Europe. Alsace was in the front line. For this period there is a lack of descriptions or reliable statistics on Alteckendorf and more broadly for the entire County of Hanau-Lichtenberg to which the village belonged. It is therefore difficult to get a clear idea.

==== The Battle of Pfaffenhoffen, 31 July 1633 ====
Based on information found in the parish records of the surrounding villages, the county seemed to be in a sad state. Bouxwiller, its capital, was inhabited in 1634 by only eight people. In 1639 Printzheim had only three inhabitants; Ernolsheim-lès-Saverne had no more than five men, two widows, and a child; Imbsheim and Kirrwiller had no inhabitants at all. Also in 1639, at Hattmatt, there were no longer any townsfolk and only three cultivated fields. Rather than conclude that there was a general massacre, it is more reasonable to assume a migration of villagers before the enemy troops. The pastor of Pfaffenhoffen clearly indicated in one of his books that he had to flee with his parishioners to Lichtenberg and he returned on 10 March 1634. He was found to have recorded no baptisms between 15 May 1633 and 10 August 1634. It was during this time that Pfaffenhoffen and its surroundings were the scene of a battle between 31 July and 1 August 1633, between the victorious Swedish Infantry of the Prince of Birkenfeld and the Lorraine Imperial troops. Another migration occurred between 24 October 1635 and 8 July 1637 when there was also no baptisms registered at Pfaffenhoffen. As discussed below, for several years migrations of the populations of Pfaffenhoffen and Alteckendorf were spread over much the same periods.

==== The city of Bouxwiller, a haven for Alteckendorfois ====
At that time, cities were surrounded by walls and were better defended militarily. Alsatian towns served as a refuge for rural populations. Saverne, which was then a populated city of 2,000 inhabitants, during the invasion of Mansfeld in 1622 hosted more than 1,600 refugees from 33 different villages. Strasbourg, a city of 25,000 inhabitants, identified in January 1622, 9,812 refugees who had come from the surrounding villages with their livestock and reserves of wine, flour and cereals. This overcrowding led to plague epidemics that caused 4,388 deaths in that year in Strasbourg. By studying the Lutheran parish records of Bouxwiller between 1618 and 1648 it appears that this small town had also seen a large population of refugees. In the worst years, these fugitives were from twenty to thirty villages. Most of these places are located south and southeast of Bouxwiller and the villages were predominantly Lutheran. These were in the immediate surroundings of Kirrwiller and Bosselshausen and in more distant places such as Duntzenheim located more than 13 kilometres away in a direct line. The inhabitants of Catholic villages are also mentioned such as: Lixhausen, Bossendorf, and Ettendorf for example.

For the inhabitants of Alteckendorf, three peaks can be distinguished of their presence in Bouxwiller. The first flight of April–May 1622 was the result of the invasion by General Mansfeld of Alsace. The hardest period for Alteckendorfois during the conflict seems to have been between 1633 and 1636. Therefore, most of the acts of baptisms and burials of the people of Alteckendorf registered at Bouxwiller were first between May 1633 and April 1634 with 13 baptisms and 19 funerals. Then secondly between October 1635 and November 1636 with 5 baptisms and 38 funerals, including that of the Schultheiß of Alteckendorf, Hans Ziller, on 12 March 1636.

==== The long return to normality ====
This conflict undoubtedly affected Alteckendorf. At a minimum the authority exercised by the lordship of the county which had organized religious life since the introduction of the Protestant Reformation in 1545 was no longer able to provide a dedicated pastor from 1622 to 1654. At the height of the unrest and the epidemics the parish was served by deacons from Bouxwiller. Georg Burkhard Knoderer was mentioned in 1622 as pastor of Alteckendorf but during this year one of his children was buried in Bouxwiller, a victim of the plague. After the end of the conflict of 1650 to 1654 Alteckendorf is served by Pastor Zinck from the nearby village of Schwindratzheim. Then, the county's administration was reorganized and from 1654 to 1658 Pastor Johann Georg Ledermann was appointed to the parish. His successor from 1658 to 1680 was Johann Schmeder. According to historian Rodolphe Reuss, in 1660 he received 35 Gulden (florins), 20 quartauts of rye, 5 quartauts of wheat, two quartauts of oats and half a cask (about 465.5 litres) of wine. For his role as schoolmaster, he received 50 bales of straw, 50 bundles of sticks and for each child a tuition fee of 2 shillings and 6 pfennig for each term (three terms per year). Local parish registers recorded baptisms, marriages and deaths from 1654 and in 1658 there were two pastors. The ancient books were lost during the conflict.

At the end of the war Alteckendorf had a deficit of population. In 1618, before the conflict, the village had 68 households of townsfolk. At the end of hostilities in 1649–50 there were only 16 households remaining. The peasant population was about 340 people (estimated from 80 households). From the marriage register of the Lutheran parish it appears that the two communities of Eckendorf and Oberaltdorf filled the gap by welcoming more population from 1659 to 1725: mostly consisting of thirty Swiss immigrants, of Protestant origin from the canton of Bern and four German Württembergers. However, these migrants lived in a place adjoining the village. The village community had not been completely decimated by the conflict. Moreover, Oberalt und Bann Eckendorffer General Erneuerungs Protocoll (Book of general renewal of finage (boundaries of the village) for Oberaltdorf and Eckendorf) relates that many fields were no longer cultivated by the owners. These uncultivated lands were assigned to the Swiss immigrants such as Adam Gebweiler, Heinrich Fechter, and Peter Wölling.

=== The Ancien Régime ===
==== The Eckendorf Castle in 1702 ====
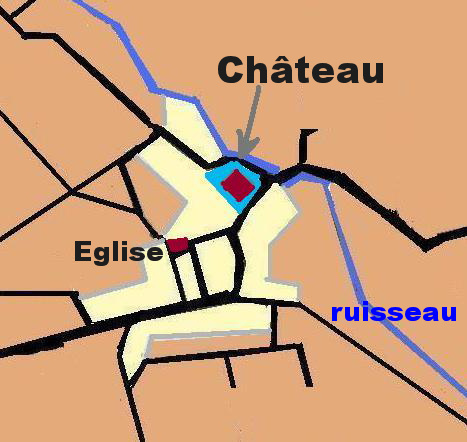
Suggested site of the vanished castle of Eckendorf

The military engineer Guillin in the service of King Louis XIV left a description of a large part of Alsace from a military point of view. His interest was focused on all buildings that may have a use for war or defence (towers, castles, walls and ramparts). Here is his description of Alteckendorf:

Oberaldorff is a place in the bottom in which there is a small chapel.

Eckendorff is located near the bottom of a small creek with a church that has a non-arched belfry. The cemetery is covered in undergrowth. It is said that there is a good castle on the edge of the creek that forms a square face with sides of width 20 Toises flanked by three towers with battlements. The walls are 15 feet high on the ground floor and 2 to 3 feet thick in good condition surrounded by a large ditch full of water 30 to 40 feet across and 6 feet deep while the inside of the castle has been burned..

According to the statements of Guillin, it is clear that the Eckendorf Castle, today gone, was a military building of the Wasserburg type. The body of the castle was a square of 39 metres. Its walls had a thickness of 65 to 95 cm and a height of about 5 metres. There was a gap in the defences probably filled with water from the Landgraben stream. This gap was 10 to 13 metres wide with a depth of 2 metres.

==== Union of two villages ====
The villages of Altdorf and Eckendorf, from 1474 were a single parish but they actually merged in 1777. On this occasion a feast was celebrated midway between the two locations, near a spinney called "die Laube".

==== Censuses, migrations, and statistics ====
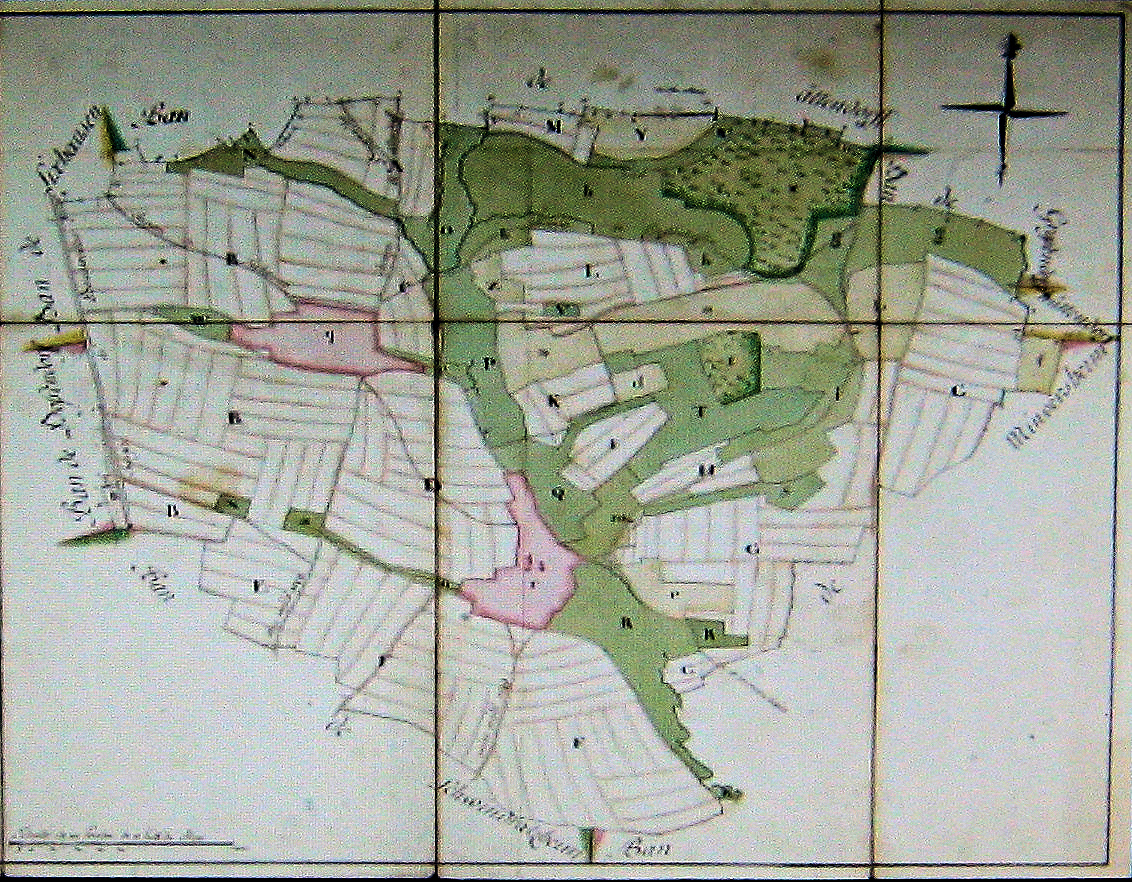
The plan of 1760 shows two distinct villages (in pink)

In 1720, 55 fires are listed but in 1750 there were only 51. Historians generally apply a factor of 5 giving an estimate of 500 people in 100 households. The village population can then be estimated at 275 people in 1720 and 255 in 1755. This figure is probably an underestimate, since in the census of 1793, 531 people were counted.

One of the probable causes of the decline of the local population was religious and economic immigration to the New World. Among other migrants there was Catharina Ruch born on 16 November 1724 in Alt-Eckendorf. On 18 March 1750 she arrived in Herrnhaag in Hesse where she entered the community of the Moravian Church founded by Nikolaus Ludwig von Zinzendorf. Then after stops in Holland and England, she arrived on 25 November 1752 in Bethlehem, Pennsylvania via New York. After passing through Nazareth, Pennsylvania she returned to Bethlehem where she founded a family with Johann Krause. Another of these migrants was Johannes Adam Matter born 14 March 1700 at Eckendorf. After being having his case dismissed in 1730 by the court of the Sovereign Council of Colmar on a tax surplus of 118 florins, he moved to Ingwiller where he married. On 16 and 21 July 1751 his property situated in this locality was seized and sold at auction after his flight to America. He arrived at the port of Philadelphia on 16 September 1751 from the ship Edinburgh and was required, with twenty members of his family, to swear allegiance to the British king.

In 1782, 45% of farmland extent was the property of the villagers. This represented an area of 930 acres out of a total of 2,072 acres. For the collection of the tax of 4% of the produce, five farmers were taxed for operations from 30 to 35 hectares, two from 20 to 30 hectares, five from 10 to 20 hectares and eleven for 2-5 hectares. For 1789 there is a record of the work. This paper identifies three categories of farmers: those who can make available a horse-drawn carriage to the authorities, those who may have an ox-cart, and those who have only themselves. For Alteckendorf, seven farmers had six or more horses, two had five, four had four, and one had three. Eighteen farmers had two cows. In addition, there were 73 labourers available for work. As twelve farmers are taxed for from 10 to 35 hectares and fourteen farmers had from 4 to 10 horses, it is reasonable to assume that the farmer who owned three horses operated at least 10 hectares.

=== During the Revolution ===
Pastor Jakob Christian Roehrich was posted to Alteckendorf from 1795 to 1802 and left in the parish archives a testament about the period of the Terror. (Note: p. 29, 149, 159.)

"In our time the most violent persecutions prevailed against worship and ministers of religion. Under the threat of incurring heavy prison sentences and even the death penalty, it was forbidden for the clergy to perform any religious act whatsoever. It was equally forbidden to baptize, to celebrate a wedding to attend the dead, or to bring words of comfort to the sick. Euloge Schneider and his companions, the representatives of a blood thirsty government, were willing to consider any intervention by clergy as an act of hostility to the state or as a Counter-revolutionary crime falling under the threat of intervention by the guillotine that was paraded across the country. Under the government of Robespierre all objects of worship, vases and vestments were removed and the clergy were imprisoned on the basis of the decree of the 1st Thermidor of Year II. This persecution continued even after the fall of Robespierre and until the decree of 3 Ventôse in the Year III which granted the free exercise of all religions. The most difficult times of persecution had lasted so long that a whole year passed before parish life could resume. My predecessor, Michael Mehl, died a year ago on the 3 Ventôse in Year II. I, Jakob Christian Roehrich from Strasbourg was elected master of religion for this parish and accepted the post on 14 Germinal of the Year III (3 April 1795). I continued to record baptisms, deaths, marriages, and confirmations in the parish register. I also tried to complete the record for the years of persecution when it was forbidden to record. So I tried as much as possible to list all clandestine marriages and baptisms by midwives or other citizens."

In the autumn of 1799, a report on the state of public opinion indicated that for the canton of Hochfelden, "except for some communes: Alteckendorf Duntzenheim Wickersheim Waltenheim, Wilshausen Hohfrankenheim, Ingenheim, and Melsheim all others comprising the arrondissement are havens for rebel priests, emigrants, deserters, and other bitter enemies of the Republic".

=== Alteckendorf during the 19th and 20th centuries ===
==== Population growth (1793–1836) ====
Between 1793 and 1836, like other village communities of the plain of Alsace, Alteckendorf saw its population increase sharply. During these forty-three years, the population grew from 531 inhabitants in 1793 to 777 inhabitants in 1836. An increase of 31.66%. Then from 1836 to 1901 the population of Alteckendorf stabilised. The average population during the second period was 750 people. The lowest was reached in 1856 with 712 inhabitants and the highest in 1901 with 786 inhabitants.

==== The Alsatian agricultural world in crisis (1850–1950) ====
The 1850s marked the beginning of a long crisis latent in the Alsatian agricultural world. According to geographer Etienne Juillard, the Alsatian countryside was not able to adapt to the Industrial Revolution and the urban explosion which followed. Agricultural and social structures inherited from 18th century prosperity were not able to modernize and compete with other French or European regions more responsive to the needs of the time. Alsatian rural areas then froze and remained characterized by the smallness of its farms, the smallness of its cultivated land, and a rural population attached to the land and its obsolete productive methods.

This inability of rural Alsace to adapt to a new more competitive economic environment was accompanied by a rural exodus which continued until the end of the Second World War. Nevertheless, the Alsatian villages retained high population densities (between 75 and 150 people per square kilometre). While the neighbouring villages such Minversheim, Ettendorf, and Buswiller experienced a steady decline in population between 1831 and 1954, Alteckendorf was in a little better demographic situation. Until 1901 the population did not decrease at all but stabilised. The demographic crisis only occurred during the first fifty years of the 20th century. Between 1901 and 1954, the population dropped 23.28% from 786 inhabitants in 1901 to 603 in 1954. Even at the height of the exodus, however, Alteckendorf remained densely populated with 105 inhabitants per square kilometre.

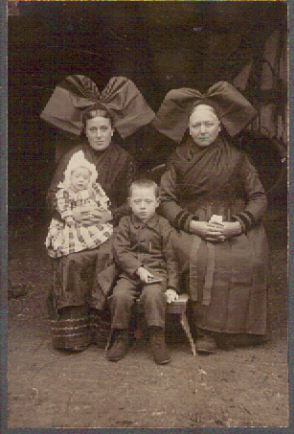
The Finitzer family of Alteckendorf circa 1915

Another sign of this crisis in the Alsatian agricultural world was the departure of the rural population to the New World. This migration preoccupied the French royal and imperial authorities. Religious officials were charged with taking an inventory on these departures out of France. In 1856 there was a notice in the baptismal register that said that since 1828, for Alteckendorf, nearly a hundred people went to the Americas.

During the 19th century the village community remained very homogeneous from a religious point of view. In 1861 734 people consisted of 725 Lutherans, 3 Catholics, and 6 dissidents. Five years later, in 1866, of 760 people surveyed, 748 were Protestants and the remaining 12 were sectarian. People counted as dissidents or sectarian were probably members of the Fröhlichianer religious movement, a new Anabaptist religion introduced in Alteckendorf by Sophie Abert, the daughter of the local Lutheran pastor from 1802 to 1841: Friedrich Christian Schneider.

Philippe Auguste Kroh, a Lutheran pastor who served from 1855 to 1886, in one of his reports indicated that Alteckendorf was primarily an agricultural town. Few could properly be called poor; some relief funds are distributed to well-off people, the welfare office combines a portion of its revenue. Four cabarets in a commune of 760 souls do not promote morality nor economy among the youth.

==== The end of the agricultural world ====
The first decade of the 20th century for Alteckendorf marked the height of its population. In 1901, the village was inhabited by 786 people. This figure is a maximum that will never be reached again. In 1907 there were 156 farms with ten having an area less than half a hectare. Forty-eight farms with areas from a half to 2 hectares, 60 from 2 to 5 hectares, and thirty-eight from 5 to 20 hectares. These figures show the preponderance of small farms. In the 1950s, to maintain a modest income, these farms are operated as polycultures. Within one farm diversification is extreme: a handful of breeding calves and piglets, daily sales from a few litres of milk to the cooperative, crops of tobacco, sugar beet, cereals, and potatoes, for harvest.

In 1989 there were only 26 farms, three of which had an area of less than 5 hectares. 7 farms have areas from 4 to 10 hectares, 7 from 10 to 20 hectares, 6 from 20 to 40 hectares and 3 over 40 hectares.

In 2006, only 2.2% of workers in Alteckendorf were still engaged in agriculture.

==== The World Wars ====
At the outbreak of World War I Alsace-Lorraine had been German since the Treaty of Frankfurt in 1871. Between 1914 and 1918, 166 Alteckendorfois young men were conscripted into the army of Kaiser Wilhelm II. Nineteen of them were killed or missing. Eight soldiers were killed on the Russian front, one in Morocco and nine on the French front.

On 10 December 1919, after the return of Alsace to France, the Bürgermeister (Mayor) of Alteckendorf Johann Richert, who had been in office since 1893, resigned because he did not speak French. His successor, Mayor George Luke Richert remained in office until 1940. In that year, he was deposed by the occupying Nazi authorities. He was replaced until the end of the war by Michael Fuchs.

In 1940, two Alteckendorfois fighting in French uniform were killed in the fighting against the Germans, one near Seltz and one near Rennes.

On 25 August 1942, when Alsace was not officially German, the Nazis, who had controlled the region since 1940, mandated the enlistment of young Alsatians into the Wehrmacht. Sixty-eight young Alteckendorfoises were conscripted and forty-three of them were sent to the Russian front. Twenty of these Malgré-nous were killed.

From the point of view of fighting in Alteckendorf, there were two air incidents in 1944. On 21 September 1944 a German train was attacked and bombed near the station by allied aircraft. Ten Germans were injured and three were killed. A week later on 28 September 1944 there was a dogfight in the sky above Alteckendorf at low altitude. Three aircraft crashed to the ground at Hochfelden, Issenhausen, and Obermodern and a villager was shot and wounded in the thigh.

On 24 November 1944, the village was liberated by U.S. ground forces. The council set up by the Nazis was dissolved and the Francophile Mayor George Richert Luke remained in office until his death, at the age of 65 on 2 November 1949.

=== Heraldry ===
Arms of Alteckendorf	In the armorial of Louis XIV, the blazon of the Communes of Oberaltorff and Exquendorff is: Blazon: Azure, Saint Martin cutting his cloak to give to a pauper sitting at sinister, the Saint to dexter of a pile of a church all posed on a hill all in Or. It represents the Parish Seal from 1577.

The municipality does not use the simplified official crest and decided to keep the old version so the new one was never used.

During part of the 20th century the city used a shield showing an apple upside down which was abandoned in the 1980s.

== Administration ==
=== Canton and intercommunality ===
Alteckendorf is one of 53 communes in the canton of Bouxwiller. The town is part of the community of communes of Pays de la Zorn.

=== Mayors ===
List of Successive Mayors of Alteckendorf

Mayors from the 17th century to 1940

From	To	Name
1633		Matern Poss
1635	1636	Hans Ziller
1648		Hans Diebold
1662	1684	Diebolt
1686	1686	Lucas Reichhardt
1727		Nicolaus Schmidt
1735		Anton Kieffer
1769	1790	Johann Richert
1775	1775	Nicolaus Scholler
1776	1776	Georg Ruch
1777	1777	Johann Ruch
1778	1778	Georg Wein
1779	1779	Jacob Schleiffer
1780	1780	Georg Rohr
1790	1792	Jacques Matter
1796	1796	Jacob Mattern
1796	1797	Johann Matter
1797	1797	Michel Mattern
1797	1797	Johann Fuchs
1798	1798	Michel Mattern
1800	1813	Johann Richert
1813	1821	Michel Richert
1821	1826	Matter
1826	1837	Jacques Mattern
1837	1871	Michel Richert
1871	1882	Georges Mattern
1882	1887	Lucas Richert
1887	1893	Georges Bronner
1893	1919	Jean Richert
1919	1940	Georges Luc Richert

Mayors from 1940

From	To	Name
1940	1945	Michel Fuchs
1945	1949	Georges Luc Richert
1949	1953	Michel Mahler
1953	1971	Michel Trog
1971	1983	Jean-Paul Richert
1983	2001	Georges Schultz
2001	2012	Georges Harter
2012	2026	Alain Hipp

=== Taxation ===
The taxation of households and businesses of Alteckendorf in 2008 and 2009
Tax	Taxes applied in 2008 (communal part)	Taxes applied in 2009 (communal part)	Revenue generated dégagées in 2009 in €
Household Tax (TH)	6.41%	6.57%	51,000
Building Tax (TFPB)	7.41%	7.60%	39,000
Land Tax (TFPNB)	40.80%	41.82%	17,000
Business Tax (TP)	9.83%	10.08%	21,000

=== Budget ===
Evolution of indebtedness (in thousands of €):	Changes in capital expenditure (in thousands of €):

== Economy ==
=== Economic activity ===
The town is located in a triangle formed by the cities of Strasbourg, Haguenau, and Saverne which is the main places of employment in the Department of Bas-Rhin.

In 2009, the only local shops were a bakery, a butcher, and a restaurant called S'Rebstoeckel. Agriculture has become marginal in terms of employment (2.2% of the workforce).

The main business is industrial bodywork heavy industry founded in 1959. Next to that in the construction industry are a tiler, a metal roofer, a carpenter-cabinetmaker, an art Glazier, a locksmith, etc.

=== Active population ===
In 2004, the average household income was €16,583 / year (cf. €15,027 / year nationwide). In 2006 out of 739 inhabitants, the working population was 350 people (204 men and 146 women). Only 36 of them worked in the town. The majority (297 individuals) worked in other communes of the department.

Structure of employment in Alteckendorf according to the 1999 census

	Farm Workers	Tradesmen, shopkeepers, business managers	Officials, Intellectuals	Intermediate Professions	Employees	Workers
Alteckendorf	2,2 %	4,4 %	7,89 %	21,1 %	25,6 %	38,9 %
National Average	2,4 %	6,4 %	12,1 %	22,1 %	29,9 %	27,1 %
Source of data: INSEE

== Demography ==
The inhabitants of the commune are known as Alteckendorfois or Alteckendorfoises in French.

Historical population

Year	Pop.	±% p.a.
1793	531	—
1800	588	+1.47%
1806	624	+1.00%
1821	701	+0.78%
1831	732	+0.43%
1836	777	+1.20%
1841	770	−0.18%
1846	757	−0.34%
1851	758	+0.03%
1856	712	−1.24%
1861	734	+0.61%
1866	760	+0.70%
1872	747	−0.29%
1875	730	−0.76%
1880	745	+0.41%
1885	739	−0.16%
1890	735	−0.11%
1895	757	+0.59%
1900	786	+0.75%

Year	Pop.	±% p.a.
1905	776	−0.26%
1910	767	−0.23%
1921	675	−1.15%
1926	646	−0.87%
1931	670	+0.73%
1936	653	−0.51%
1946	637	−0.25%
1954	603	−0.68%
1962	619	+0.33%
1968	618	−0.03%
1975	648	+0.68%
1982	661	+0.28%
1990	705	+0.81%
1999	746	+0.63%
2007	738	−0.13%
2012	824	+2.23%
2017	868	+1.05%
2023	857	−0.21%

Source: EHESS and INSEE

=== Housing ===
In 2017 of the 371 dwellings in the town 92.6% were primary residences. Only two units were second homes (0.5%). The dwellings were mainly houses (91.5%) – apartments accounted for only 8.2%. There were 26 vacant dwellings. 85.8% of residents were their own landlord while 11.6% were renting, and 2.7% were housed free of charge. Between 2007 and 2017, 58 units were added. 28.7% of housing units were built before 1945, 31.5% between 1946 and 1990, 17.2% between 1991 and 2005 and 22.7% between 2006 and 2014.

== Local life ==
=== Language ===
The majority of the inhabitants can speak and/or understand German and also speak French. The local dialect is known as Alsacien. Alsacien is a dialect of German that has been spoken and developed in the region for over a thousand years.

=== Facilities and services ===
- The multipurpose hall has been in operation since the 1980s. This is the old SNCF train station which became the property of the commune. The building is composed of a large and a small room that are rented to associations and individuals for their festive and cultural events. The management of this site is provided by the Association of Sports and Leisure of Alteckendorf (ASLA), which includes within it all the Alteckendorf associations.
- The waste sorting station is located in the square at the Station. Individuals can drop off their old paper and paperboard, used glass, and plastic bottles. For more bulky waste the community of communes of Pays de la Zorn has established drop-off centres at Bossendorf and Mutzenhouse.
- The municipal stadium or large football field, inaugurated on 27 June 1987, is owned by the commune. The small stage at the back of the stadium is the property of the Alteckendorf Football Club.
- The multipurpose hall in the old school is reserved for associations. During elections this place serves as a polling station.

=== Education ===
Alteckendorf depends on the Academy of Strasbourg.

Since 1983, the municipalities of Minversheim and Alteckendorf have teamed up to provide a better educational environment for students in primary grades and to avoid class closures. Students then go on to Gustave Doré college at Hochfelden.

To continue their studies in high school, young Alteckendorfois mainly go to Bouxwiller or Saverne.

=== Health ===
A general practitioner resides in Alteckendorf. The nearest pharmacies are in Schwindratzheim, Hochfelden, and Mommenheim. As for hospitals, they are located in Saverne, Haguenau, and Strasbourg.

=== Associations ===
In 2008, the associative provisions for a village of fewer than 800 inhabitants was quite diverse.

- The friendly Corps of firefighters. The local corps was created in 1888 and has been pooled with that of Ettendorf since 23 October 2008 (18 firefighters with 12 from the area).
- The union of Arborists of Alteckendorf and surroundings, created circa 1899 by the teacher Valentin Huss.
- The music society Alsatia, founded 9 December 1925 (19 members).
- The Football Club of Alteckendorf (FCA), established on 2 December 1983 (35 licensed seniors for the 2008–09 season), the first team playing in the third departmental division.
- The club Gymnastics of Alteckendorf (GEA), founded in July 1984 (thirty members).
- the Club Flower of the Ages (formerly seniors club).
- The Country Club Black Angels (thirty members).
- The parish choir founded in 1995 under the leadership of Pastor Sybille Stohrer (fifteen singers).
- the club Les Frissons de la Danse was created in 2001 (70 members).

=== Religions ===
Throughout its history, Alteckendorf has been a predominantly Protestant village. The village passed to Lutheranism in 1545 as did all the County of Hanau-Lichtenberg but the first pastor was not appointed until in 1547. Since the 1970s, the dominance of Lutheranism has been diluted with the arrival of new Catholic residents and the creation of a new Evangelical Free Church.

The Lutheran parish

With churches available, there are services every second Sunday in Altdorf alternating with Eckendorf. The rectory is located at the rear of the church in Eckendorf. The Lutheran parish of Alteckendorf is part of the Consistory of Schwindratzheim and depends on inspections from Bouxwiller. It is a member of the Protestant Church of Augsburg Confession of Alsace and Lorraine (EPCAAL) with about 200,000 members, 235 parishes and 260 pastors (25% women and 75% men). Like all ancient religious communities in Alsace and Moselle, the EPCAAL lives under the Organic Articles, which were promulgated by Napoleon I in 1802. Pastors are treated as civil servants, they are appointed and paid by the State.

The Evangelical Church of Alteckendorf

The origin of this young church dates back to 1965 when the Swiss Nicolas Kessely began a work of evangelization among young people in the region. Five years later, he moved to Alteckendorf. From there, he organized parties in various places in the area, where dozens of young people gather to study the Bible, pray, and share with others their religious experiences. In 1974, to meet the spiritual longing of believers, it was decided to form a church: "The evangelical church of Alteckendorf" was created. In 1980, the Church was registered as a religious association and adhered to the Evangelical Federation of France. Then in 1983, an Alteckendorf barn is transformed into a space for meetings. Ten years later, the premises had become too small and a new worship hall was built in 1994.

== Culture and heritage ==
=== Civil heritage ===
The commune has many buildings that are registered as historical monuments:

- A Farmhouse at 14 Rue de l'Eglise (1825)
- A Farmhouse at 115 Rue Principale (1818)
- A Farmhouse at 12 Rue Principale (19th century)
- A Farmhouse at 123 Rue Principale (1826)
- A Farmhouse at 126 Rue Principale (1699)
- A Farmhouse at 132 Rue Principale (18th century)
- A Farmhouse at 141 Rue Principale (19th century)
- A Farmhouse at 146 Rue Principale (1699). This Farmhouse contains a Fresco: A cavalryman brandishing his arms which is registered as an historical object. The fresco represents the Pandour of Baron Franz von der Trenck. During the War of the Austrian Succession the pandours made their camp in the Hochfelden area in 1744 and created a reign of terror there.
- A Farmhouse at 148 Rue Principale (1694)
- A Farmhouse at 149 Rue Principale (1763)
- A Farmhouse at 150 Rue Principale (1753)
- A Farmhouse at 18 Rue Principale (1749)
- A Farmhouse at 24 Rue Principale (1841)
- A Farmhouse at 25 Rue Principale (1798)
- A Farmhouse at 27 Rue Principale (1770)
- A Farmhouse at 28 Rue Principale (1820)
- Houses and Farms

=== Religious heritage ===
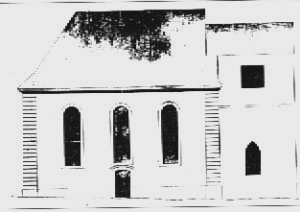
The church at Eckendorf in 1765.

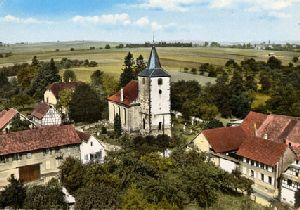
The church at Eckendorf in 1950.

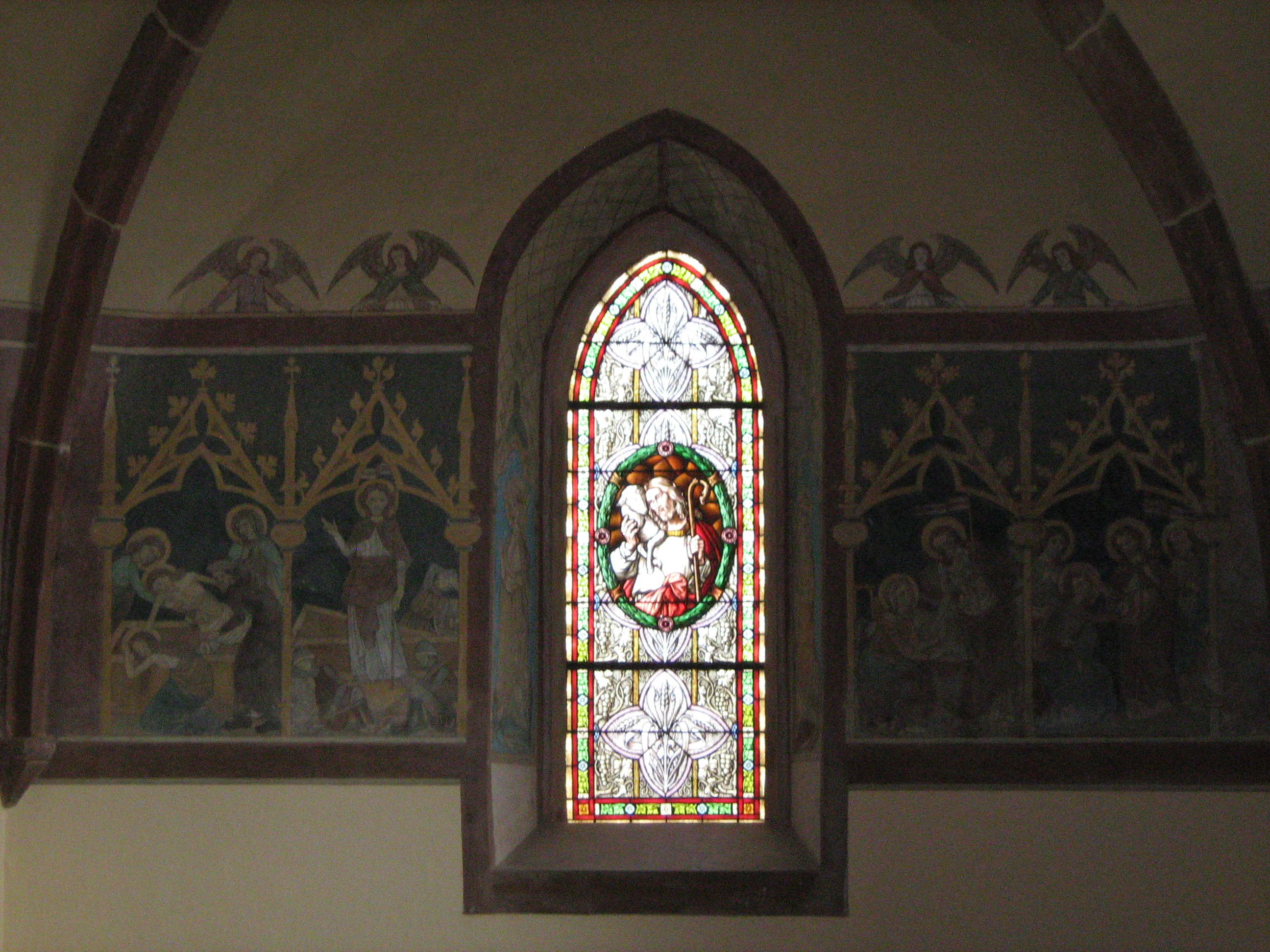
Frescoes in the Eckendorf church

The commune has two religious buildings that are registered as historical monuments:

- The Protestant Church of Saint-Arbogast (14th century). The Church has frescoes of the Passion of Christ. The oldest part is the tower-choir in Romanesque style which may date from the 14th century for its two lower levels. The last two levels were added in the 18th century after the reconstruction of the nave in 1765. The keystone of the choir bears the date of 1667 perhaps indicating the date of restoration. An Organ from 1898 by the Brothers Linck of Württemberg with a facade restored in 1928 by Roetinger, transformed in 1954 by Muhleisen, and repaired in 1991. Now the church of Eckendorf can be seen as it was after the reconstruction of the nave in 1765 – the tower has not been raised since and has remained the same through the 20th century. The church has many items that are registered as historical objects:
  - The Furniture in the Church of Saint Arbogast
  - A Protestant Chalice with Paten (1822)
  - The Organ (1898)
  - Monumental Paintings (14th century)
  - A Pulpit (18th century)

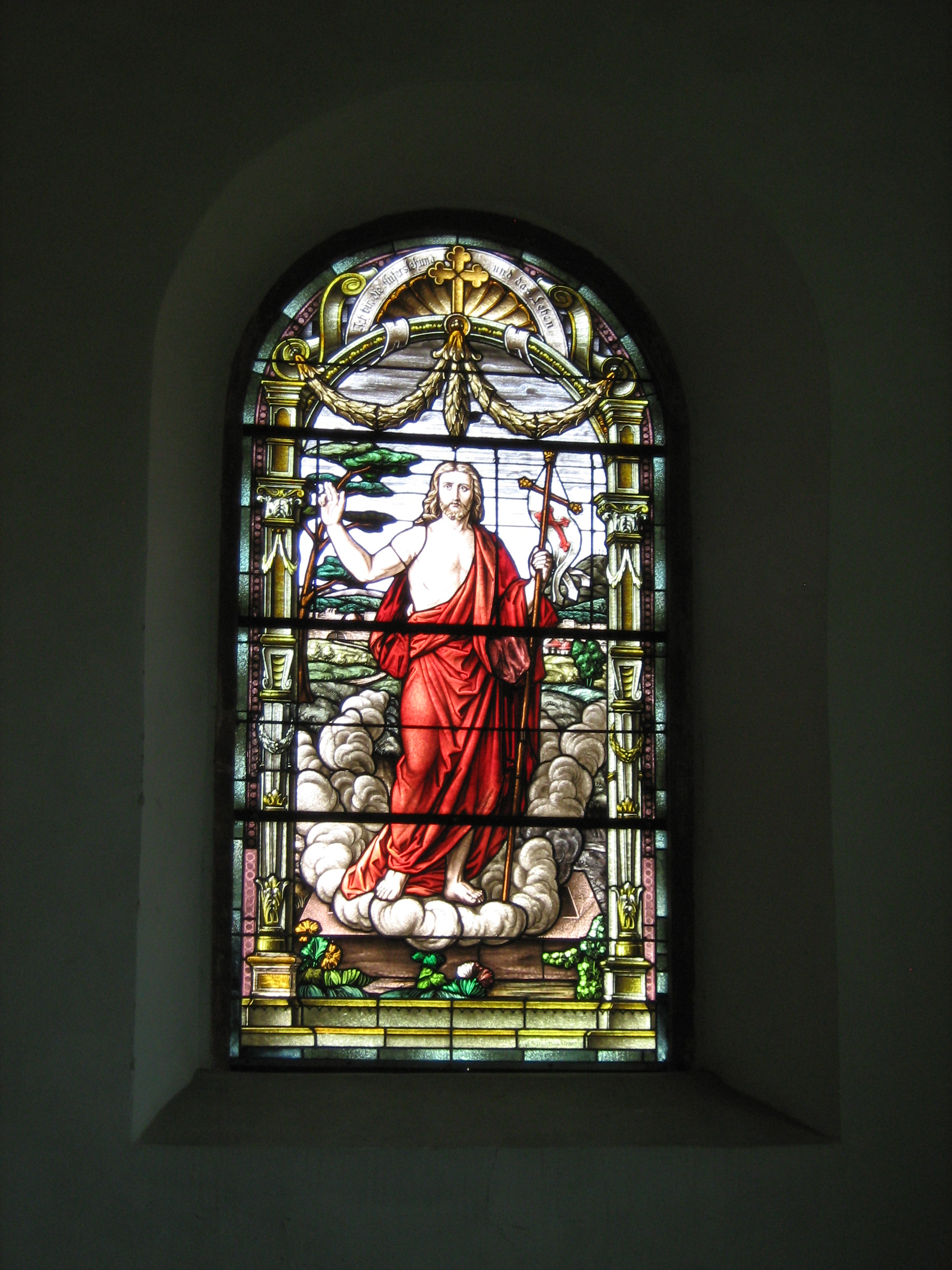
Stained glass in the tower-choir of the Altdorf church

- The Protestant Church of Saint-Martin (1775). The Church was completely rebuilt in 1775 to plans by the inspector of bridges and pathways of Lower Alsace, Charles Christiani for a total of 5,885 livres and paid for from another by the third Earl of Hessen-Hanau-Lichtenberg. The original polychrome decoration of the balustrade in the Alsatian folk art style with gray, yellow, and blue tones in harmony with yellow mottling columns were restored in 1976. The altar, dated 1776, shows a naive picture of a ewe, the body being too stretched over its legs and holding a banner. The window of the tower-choir represents Christ standing, clothed in red, exiting from his tomb into the clouds, blessing with his right hand and holding a banner with his left hand. The church contains many items that are registered as historical objects:
  - The Organ (1907)
  - A Pulpit (18th century)
  - A Protestant Altar (1776)
  - The Furniture in the Church of Saint Martin
- All movable items in the Cemetery are registered as historical objects.

=== Nicknames and traditions of the past ===
- Sürmelichblotzer : churned curdled milk
- d'Briechler: those from the swamp
- Söïkewwel : pig trough
- Until 1930 every Whit Monday there was a costume Parade called Pfingstknechte.

== Notable People linked to the commune ==
- Jacques Matter born 31 May 1791 at Alteckendorf, the son of a former mayor of the town. Died in 1864. Educator, philosopher and historian. His gifts for the studies were noticed by the local pastor at the time, Jean Frederic Schneider.
- Thimothée Guillaume Roehrich born in 1802 at Alteckendorf, died at Strasbourg in 1860. Pastor at the Saint William Temple in Strasbourg, he published a four-volume History of the Reformation in Alsace (in French). Son of the pastor of Alteckendorf, Jacques Christian Roehrich.

== See also ==
- Communes of the Bas-Rhin department

=== Bibliography ===
History and Geography

- Walter Bodmer, Swiss immigration in the county of Hanau-Lichtenberg in the 17th century, Strasbourg: Heintz, 1930 (in French)
- Jean-Michel Boehler, Rural society in the middle Rhine: The peasants of the plain of Alsace, Strasbourg, Presses Universitaires de Strasbourg, 1995, 2222 pages, ISBN 2868201393. (in French)
- Collective, Alteckendorf: two towers, one village, Strasbourg: Coprur, 1991, 224 pages, ISBN 2903297452. (in French and German)
- Etienne Juillard, Rural life in Lower Alsace, Strasbourg, Presses Universitaires de Strasbourg, 1992, 585 pages, ISBN 2868208169 (in French)
- Jean-Pierre Kintz, Strasbourg city refuge, at a Glance History of Alsace 16th-20th centuries, Tribute FSHAA, Strasbourg, Imprimerie Scheuer in Drulingen, 2008, 578 pages, ISBN 2913162770 (in French)

Religion

- Collective, Protestants of Alsace and Moselle, memoirs and life, Ingersheim, SAEP, 2006, 317 pages, ISBN 2737208122 (in French)
- Katherine M. Faull, Moravian Women's Memoires, Their related Lives, 1750-1820, Syracuse, New York, USA, Syracuse University Press, 1997, 166 pages, ISBN 0815603975

=== External links ===
- Presentation of the Architectural Heritage of Alteckendorf in a report transmitted by Zorn TV in January 2012. (in French)
- Alteckendorf on the GeneaWiki (in French)
- Alteckendorf on the old National Geographic Institute website (in French)
- Toponymy of Wissembourgeois expressions (in French)
- Alteckendorf on Géoportail, National Geographic Institute (IGN) website (in French)
- Altdorff on the 1750 Cassini Map
