= Jacques Matter =

French historian (1791–1864)

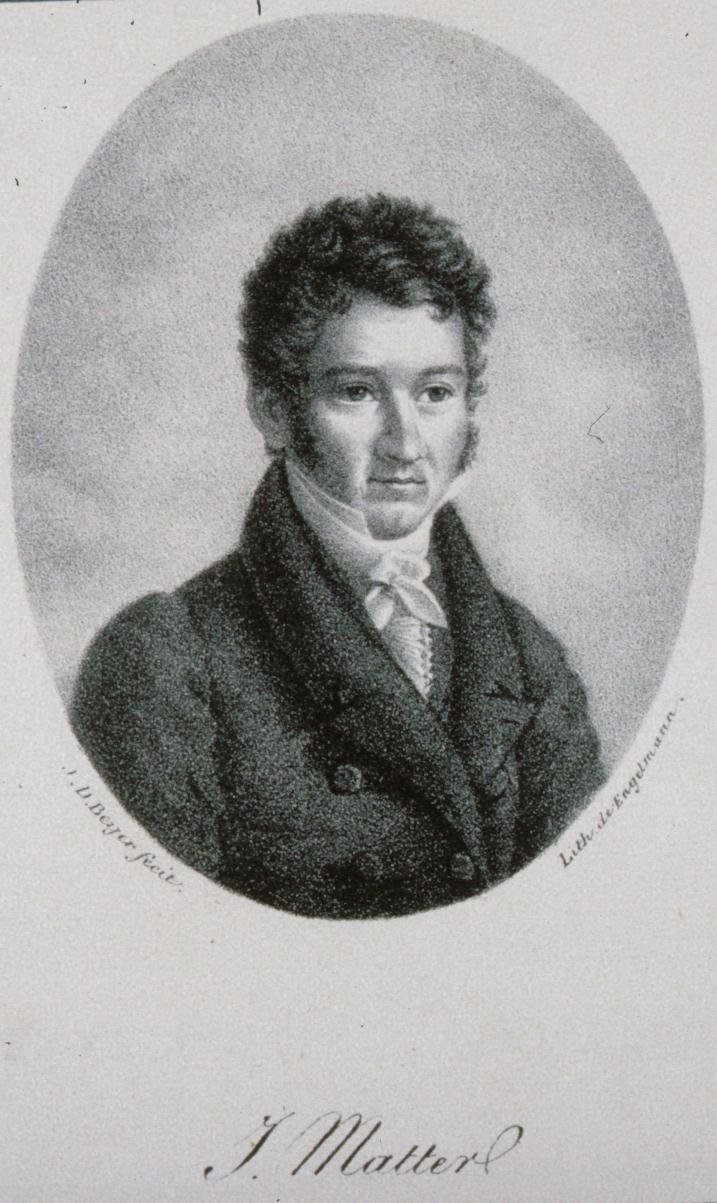
- Born: May 31, 1791; Alteckendorf, France
- Died: June 22, 1864 (aged 73)
- Education: Jean Sturm Gymnasium, Protestant Seminary
- Occupation: History professor

Jacques Matter (31 May 1791 – 22 June 1864) was an inspector general and professor of ecclesiastical history for the Faculty of Protestant Theology at the University of Strasbourg.

== Biography ==
Jacques Matter was born in Alteckendorf, France, to Jean Matter, a farmer, and Anne-Marie Schwœbel. He studied at the Jean Sturm Gymnasium, then at the Protestant Seminary and the Faculty of Protestant Theology. To further his studies, he went to Göttingen in 1814, then to Paris from 1815 to 1817, where he was mentored by the naturalist and numismatist archaeologist Millin. In 1817, he defended two theses on subjects of ancient history, and he obtained a doctorate of theology four years later.

He was married in Strasbourg on 31 March 1819 to Marie Sophie Pauline Goguel, the daughter of Georges Frédéric Goguel, a tobacco manufacturer, and Marie Marguerite Élisabeth Saltzmann, daughter of the Strasbourg theosophist Frédéric-Rodolphe Saltzmann.

He was a professor of history at the Royal College of Strasbourg (1818–1820), then professor of philosophy at the Protestant Seminary (from 1820 to 1843 and from 1846 to 1864), and finally a professor of ecclesiastical history at the Faculty of Theology. Other than teaching, Jacques Matter was also an administrator, pastor (from 1825 to 1829 in Saint-Thomas) and a prolific writer. He was appointed inspector of the academy in 1818, then inspector general of studies from 1828 to 1845. From 1822 to 1828, he was also principal of the Jean Sturm Gymnasium, which he helped to modernize and imposed French as the language of instruction in all subjects.

He particularly insisted on the use of French because he was one of the few people of his time who was aware that there was a real risk of social cleavage in Alsace between those who mastered the national language and the working class who continued to ignore it. Thus, if he did not ban German, he at least promoted the spread of French as an inspector and teacher.

In order to contribute to the training of teachers, he founded several pedagogical journals such as The Primary Institute, the Visitor of Schools and the General Manual of Primary Education.

In 1845, Jacques Matter resigned from his position to be appointed inspector general of libraries, but he only held this position for one year, before definitively devoting himself to his research. These mainly concerned esoteric philosophical doctrines, which helped to put him at the head of a circle of Strasbourg theosophists. He is also the inventor of the name "esotericism" in French, which can be found as early as 1828 in the Critical History of Gnosticism. A Freemason, he inherited Saint Martin's personal writings and was his first biographer.

His son, Albert Jules Timothée Matter (1823–1907), was also a pastor and a teacher. A specialist in Lutheran dogmas, he was the founder of the Theological Society in 1883. He also became the president of the Bible Society of France and headed the synodal commission for the revision of the Ostervald Bible published in 1744.

== Works ==
In addition to this non-exhaustive list, there are numerous contributions to periodicals, such as The Dictionary of Conversation, The Encyclopedia of the People of the World, The Revue d'Alsace, The Literature of France and the Theological Encyclopedia.

Most of Jacques Matter's books have been reprinted.

=== History and Philosophy ===
- Essai historique sur l'école d'Alexandrie et coup d'œil comparatif sur la littérature grecque depuis le temps d'Alexandre le Grand jusqu'à celui d'Alexandre Sévère, 2 t., Paris, F. G. Levrault, 1820 – rééd. et complété en 1840 (tome 1) et en 1844 (tome2)
- De l'influence des mœurs sur les lois et des lois sur les mœurs, Paris, 1823 – éd. de 1832
- Histoire critique du gnosticisme et de son influence sur les sectes religieuses et philosophiques de six premiers siècles de l'ère chrétienne, Paris, F. G. Levrault, 1828, 2 vol. (tome 1/tome2) – un troisième volume contient des planches
- Histoire universelle de l'Église chrétienne, considérée principalement dans ses institutions et ses doctrines, Strasbourg, Veuve Silbermann, 1829–1835, 4 vol. (tome 1/tome 2/tome 3/tome 4)
- Histoire des doctrines morales et politiques des trois derniers siècles, Paris, AB. Cherbuliez et Cie, 1836–1837, 3 vol. (tome 1/tome 2/tome 3)
- De l'affaiblissement des idées et des études morales, Paris, J. Hetzel et Paulin, 1841
- De l'état moral, politique et littéraire de l'Allemagne, Paris, 1847, 2 vol.
- Histoire de la philosophie dans ses rapports avec la religion depuis l'ère chrétienne, Paris Libr. Meyrueis et Cie – Libr. Hachette, 1854
- Philosophie de la religion, Paris, Grassart, 1857, 2 vol. (tome 1/tome2)

=== Pedagogy ===
- Le visiteur des écoles, 1830 – repris et complété en 1838
- L'instituteur primaire, Paris, Libr. L. Hachette, 1832
- L'instituteur primaire, ou conseils et directions pour préparer les instituteurs [...] à leur carrière, Paris, 1843
- De l'éducation des enfants dans les classes ouvrières et de leur retrait prématuré de l'école, Strasbourg, 1858

=== Mysticism and Theosophy ===
- Saint-Martin, le philosophe inconnu, sa vie et ses écrits [...], Paris, 1862 – deuxième édition sur Gallica, actuellement encore la biographie la plus complète sur ce mystique d'après l'ordre martiniste
- Emmanuel de Swedenborg, sa vie, ses écrits et sa doctrine, Paris, Didier et Cie, 1863
- Le mysticisme en France au temps de Fénélon, Paris, Didier et Cie, 1865

== See also ==
=== Bibliography ===
- P. Matter, Jacques et Albert Matter, Paris, 1908.
- Bernard Vogler, « Matter Jacques », dans Fédération des sociétés d'histoire et d'archéologie d'Alsace, Nouveau dictionnaire de biographie alsacienne, Vol.VI, Mar-Reic, 1997, p. 2561–2562.
