= Hattmatt =

Hattmatt Hàttmàtt
- Commune
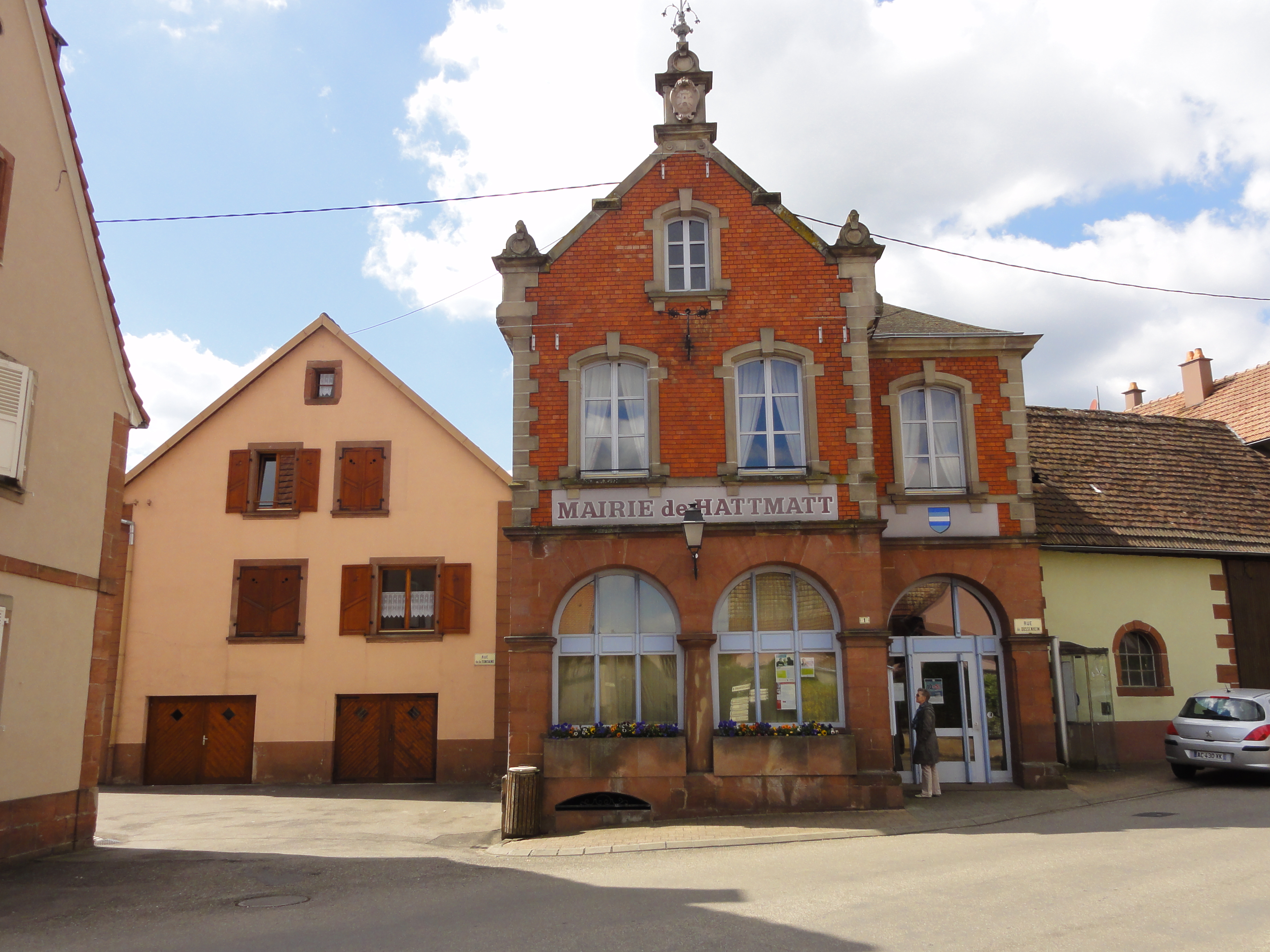
- The town hall in Hattmatt

- Coat of arms
- Location of Hattmatt
- Location within France Location within Grand Est
- Coordinates: 48°47′29″N 7°25′26″E
- Country: France
- Region: Grand Est
- Department: Bas-Rhin
- Arrondissement: Saverne
- Canton: Saverne
- Intercommunality: Pays de Saverne

Government
  - Mayor (2020–2026): Alain Sutter
- Area^{1}: 4.15 km^{2} (1.60 sq mi)
- Highest elevation: 234 m (768 ft)
- Lowest elevation: 173 m (568 ft)
- Population (2023): 619
  - Density: 149/km^{2} (386/sq mi)
- Time zone: UTC+01:00 (CET)
  - Summer (DST): UTC+02:00 (CEST)
- INSEE/Postal code: 67185 /67330
- ^{1} French Land Register data, which excludes lakes, ponds, glaciers > 1 km^{2} (0.386 sq mi or 247 acres) and river estuaries.

Hattmatt (French pronunciation: [atmat]) is a commune in the Bas-Rhin department in Grand Est in north-eastern France.

The village is located a few kilometres to the northeast of Saverne on the departmental road RD6.

== Geography ==
The river Zinsel passes through the village. The surrounding villages are Rosenwiller, Steinbourg, Dossenheim-sur-Zinsel, and Imbsheim.

== History ==
According to oral tradition, the birthplace of Hattmattois was in Wiesenau (now defunct) along Rosenwiller near Dettwiller. As the war outraged peasants, houses were burned and the population decimated. The few survivors wondered then WER HAT HÈ MOT, which means who has a meadow (field) hence the origin of HATT MOT (Hattmatt).

Other sources affirm the two villages existed at the same time. Wiesenau was an independent village of Hattmatt rather scattered habitat type (hamlet), which probably disappeared during the invasions of the Armagnacs (Armengecken) in the fifteenth century. Wiesenau is no longer mentioned as a village thereafter. There was, therefore, no longer anything in the Peasant War of 1525. It was Hattmatt Hanau-Lichtenberg who obtained the tenancy of the bank of the lost village. After a trial during the Revolution, Hattmatt obtained ownership of this bank (1793).

As for the etymology of the name, the most plausible is that of the Germanic root associated with the suffix of Hatto matt (pre). So the pre Hatto.

== Administration ==
List of mayors
Period		Name
1989	2001	Charles Jung
2001	2014	Jean-Charles Ernst
2014	2026	Alain Sutter

== See also ==
- Communes of the Bas-Rhin department
