= Altenheim =

Altenheim Àltene
- Commune
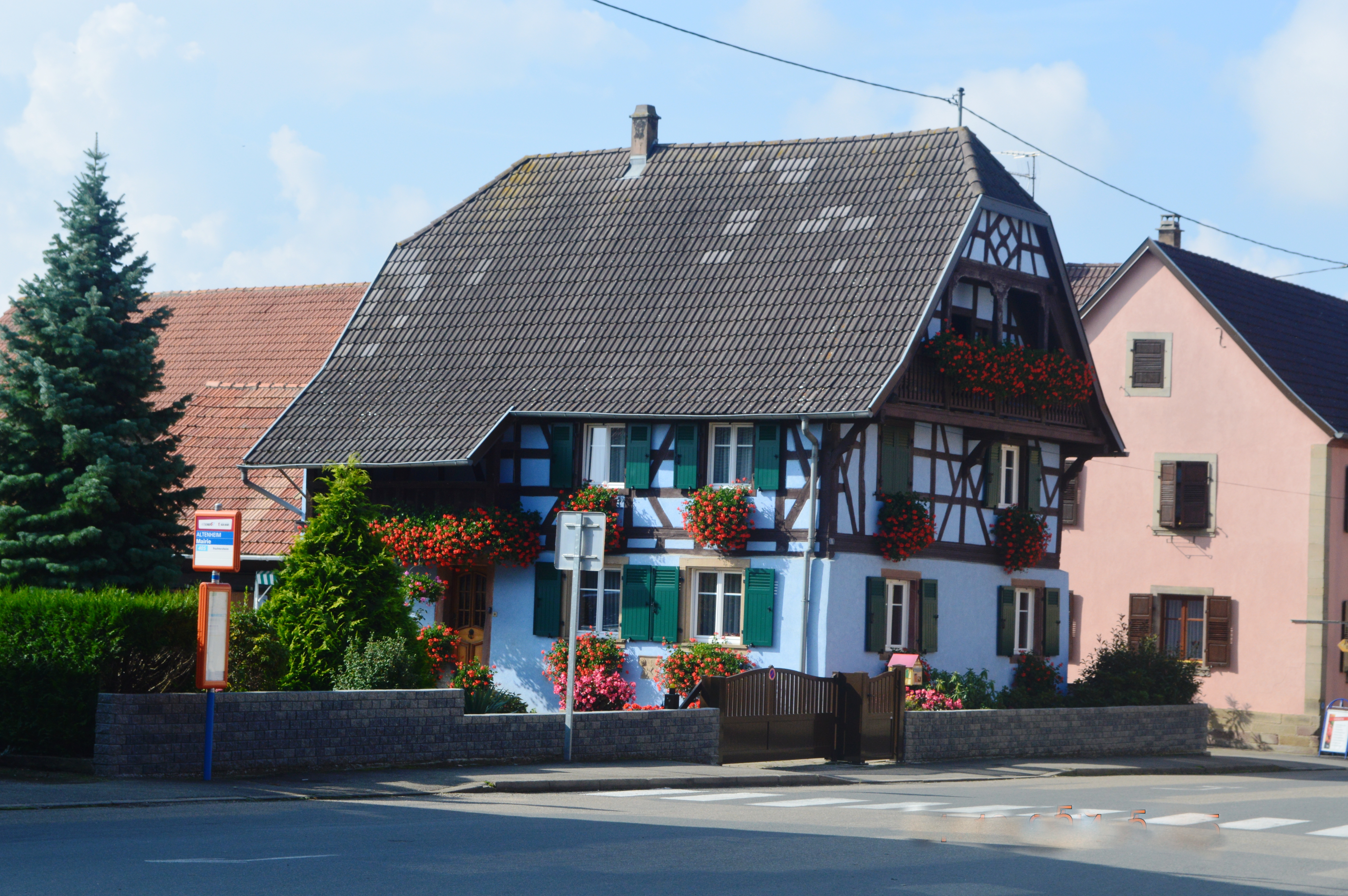
- An old house in Altenheim

- Coat of arms
- Location of Altenheim
- Location within France Location within Grand Est
- Coordinates: 48°43′13″N 7°27′52″E
- Country: France
- Region: Grand Est
- Department: Bas-Rhin
- Arrondissement: Saverne
- Canton: Saverne

Government
  - Mayor (2020–2026): Laura Ritter
- Area^{1}: 2.71 km^{2} (1.05 sq mi)
- Highest elevation: 254 m (833 ft)
- Lowest elevation: 187 m (614 ft)
- Population (2023): 229
  - Density: 84.5/km^{2} (219/sq mi)
- Time zone: UTC+01:00 (CET)
  - Summer (DST): UTC+02:00 (CEST)
- INSEE/Postal code: 67006 /67490
- ^{1} French Land Register data, which excludes lakes, ponds, glaciers > 1 km^{2} (0.386 sq mi or 247 acres) and river estuaries.

Altenheim (French pronunciation: [altənaim]) is a commune in the Bas-Rhin department in the Grand Est region of north-eastern France. It should not be confused with the German village of the same name, part of the municipality Neuried in the state of Baden-Württemberg.

== Geography ==
Altenheim is located some 10 km east by south-east of Saverne and 30 km north-west of Strasbourg. It can be accessed from five directions: from Furchhausen in the west by road D230, from Dettwiller in the north by road D112, from Littenheim in the east by road D151, from Saessolsheim in the south-east by road D230, and from Wolschheim in the south by road D112. All these roads intersect in the village. The commune consists entirely of farmland other than the village. The only waterway in the commune is the Drusenbach crossing the south-western corner and two small tributaries of this stream in the north of the commune.

== History ==
On 21 January 1945, an American B-17 bomber, the "Princess Pat" was hit by flak returning from a mission to Heilbronn and landed on its belly near the D230 road between Altenheim and Furchhausen.

=== Heraldry ===
Arms of Altenheim	Blazon: Azure, a dove argent, in its beak a laurel branch Vert, perched on a hill of three hillocks the same in pile.

== Administration ==
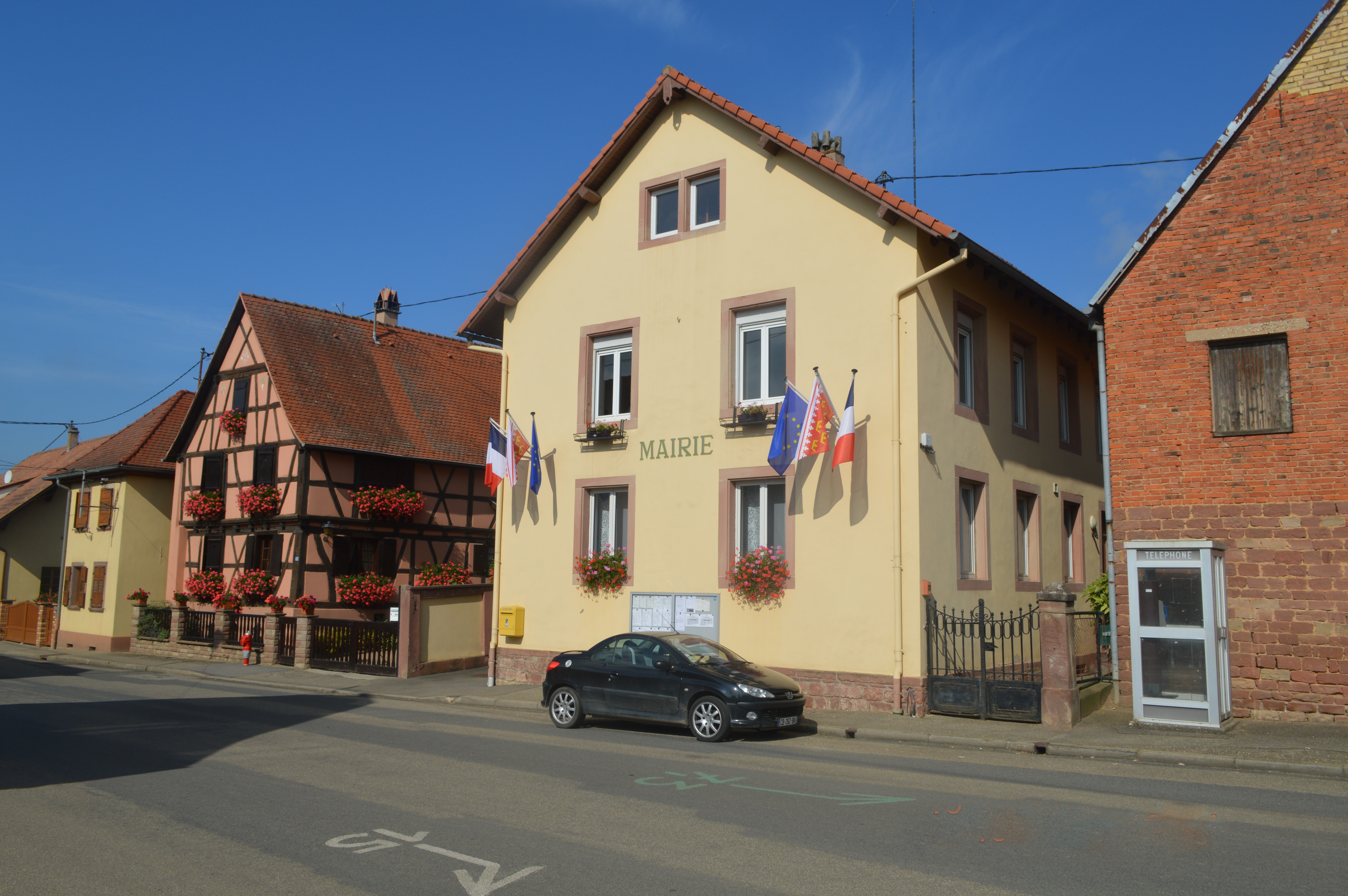
The Town Hall

List of Successive Mayors of Altenheim

From	To	Name
2001	2014	Jean-Claude Hollner
2014	2020	Mickaël Vollmar
2020	2026	Laura Ritter

== Demography ==
The inhabitants of the commune are known as Altenheimois or Altenheimoises in French.

Historical population

Year	Pop.	±% p.a.
1793	228	—
1821	349	+1.53%
1846	342	−0.08%
1871	289	−0.67%
1900	296	+0.08%
1926	269	−0.37%
1946	262	−0.13%
1962	224	−0.97%
1968	215	−0.68%

Year	Pop.	±% p.a.
1975	209	−0.40%
1982	226	+1.12%
1990	210	−0.91%
1999	215	+0.26%
2007	218	+0.17%
2012	214	−0.37%
2017	212	−0.19%
2023	229	+1.29%

Source: EHESS and INSEE

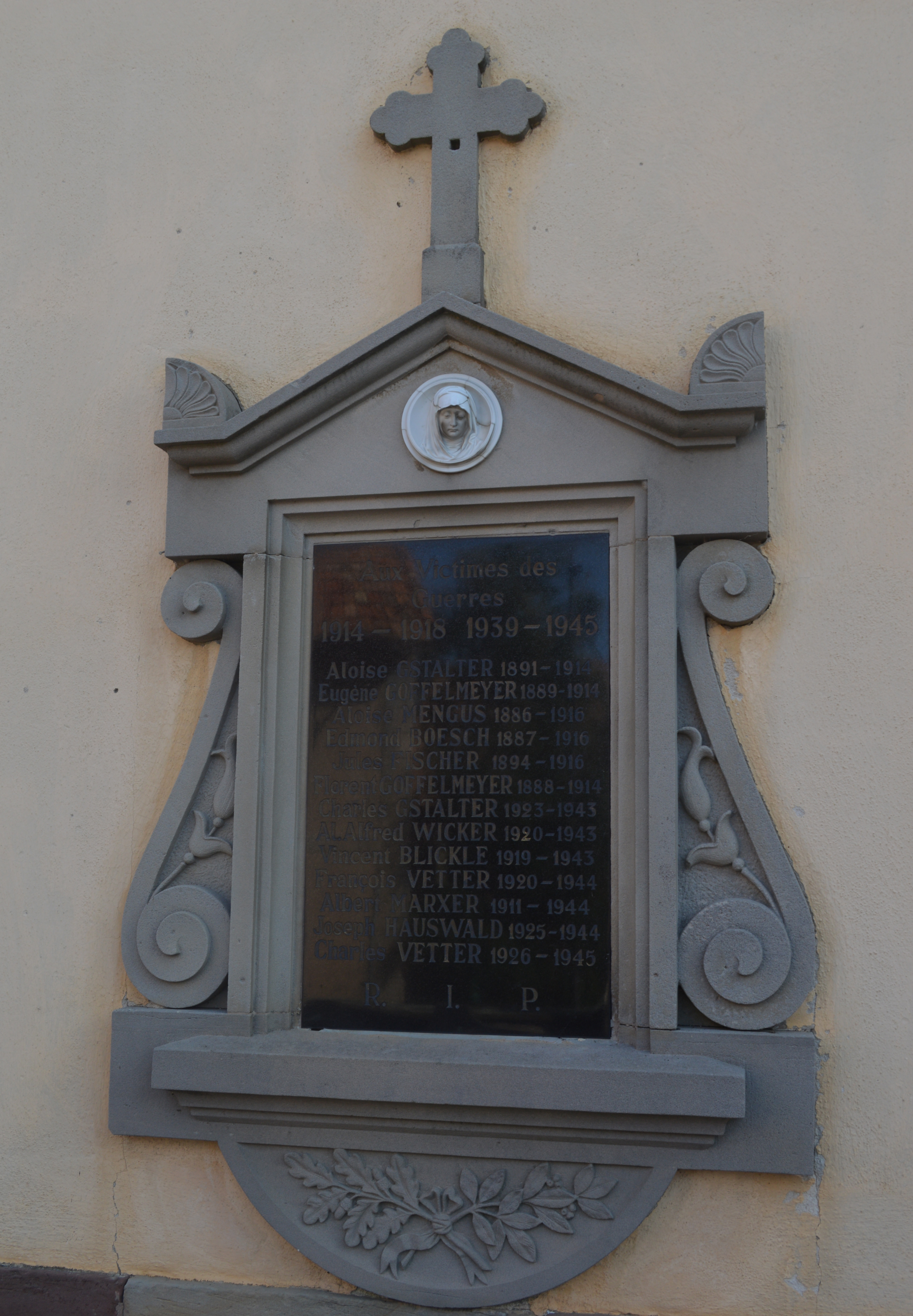
Altenheim War Memorial

== Culture and heritage ==
=== Civil heritage ===
The commune has a large number of buildings and structures that are registered as historical monuments:

- A House (4) (1837)
- A House (5)
- A House (7) (1825)
- A House (8)
- A House (11) (1716)
- A House (24) (1716)
- A House (33) (1732)
- A House (43) (1716)
- A Napoleonic Banc-Reposoir (1854)
- The Village (Prehistory to 8th century)
- Houses (18th-19th century)

=== Religious heritage ===
The commune has several religious buildings and structures that are registered as historical monuments:

- A Wayside Cross at R.D. 112 (1698)
- A Wayside Cross at R.D. 112 / R.D. 151 (1824)
- A Wayside Cross at R.D. 112 (north) (19th century)
- A Wayside Cross at R.D. 112 (south) (1870)
- A Wayside Cross at R.D. 230 (1692)
- A Wayside Cross at R.D. 230 (1742)
- A Wayside Cross at R.D. 230 (1698)
- The Chapel of la-Fête-Dieu (19th century)
- The Church of Saint Lambert (18th century). The Church contains many items that are registered as historical objects:
  - A Funeral Monument of Marie-rose Schmitt and family (1829)
  - A Funeral Monument of Maria Diss and Jean-Michel Klein (1824)
  - A Funeral Monument of Marie-Odile Debs (1837)
  - A Funeral Monument (19th century)
  - A Chalice with Paten (19th century)
  - A Statue: Saint Lambert (18th century)
  - A Neo-Gothic Chalice (19th century)
  - A Cross: Christ on the Cross
  - 2 Confessionals (18th century)
  - A Baptismal font (1690)
  - A Tabernacle (18th century)
- A Monumental Cross (1861)
- A Cemetery Cross (1882)

=== Altenheim Picture Gallery ===
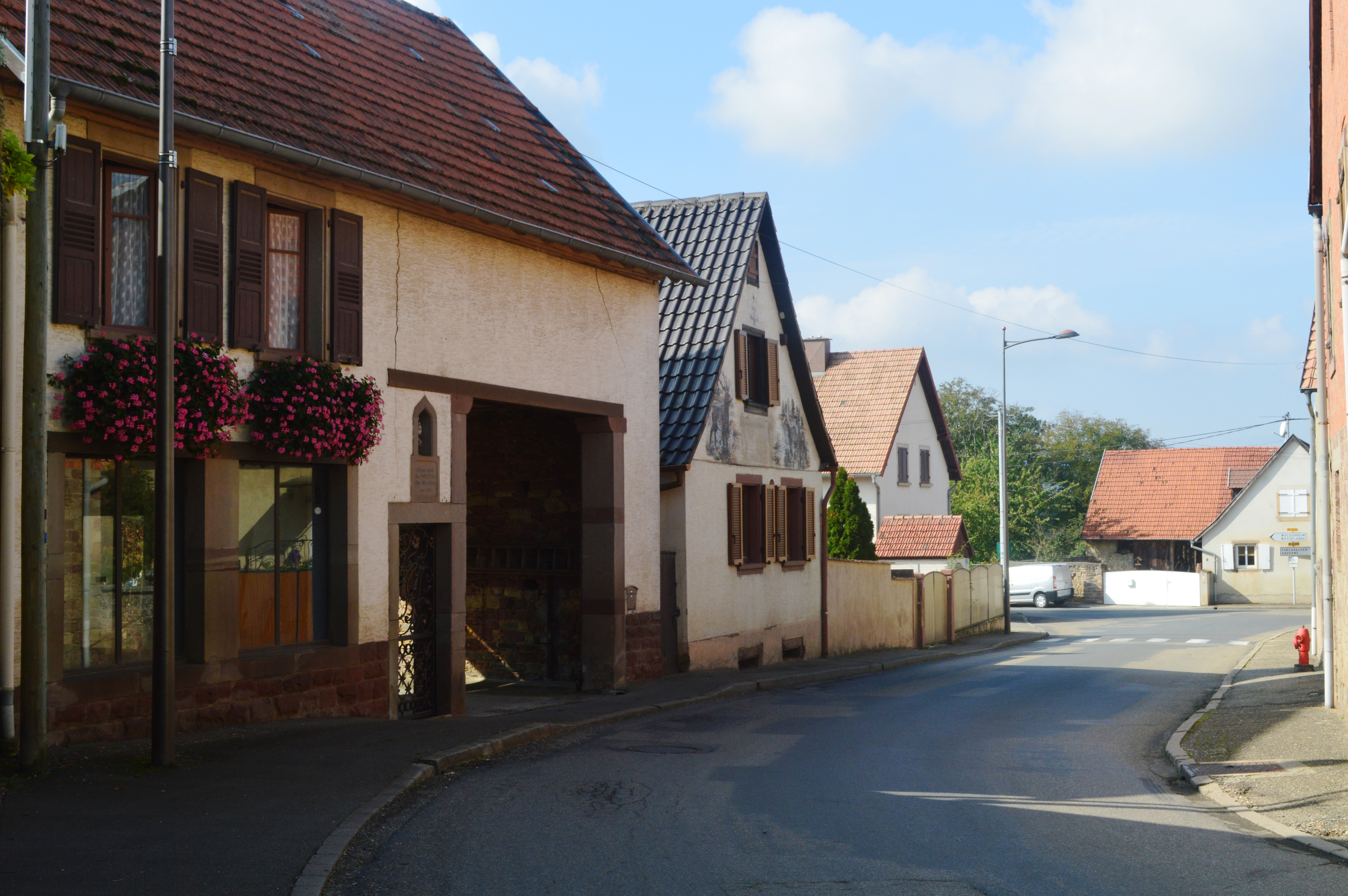
A street in Altenheim

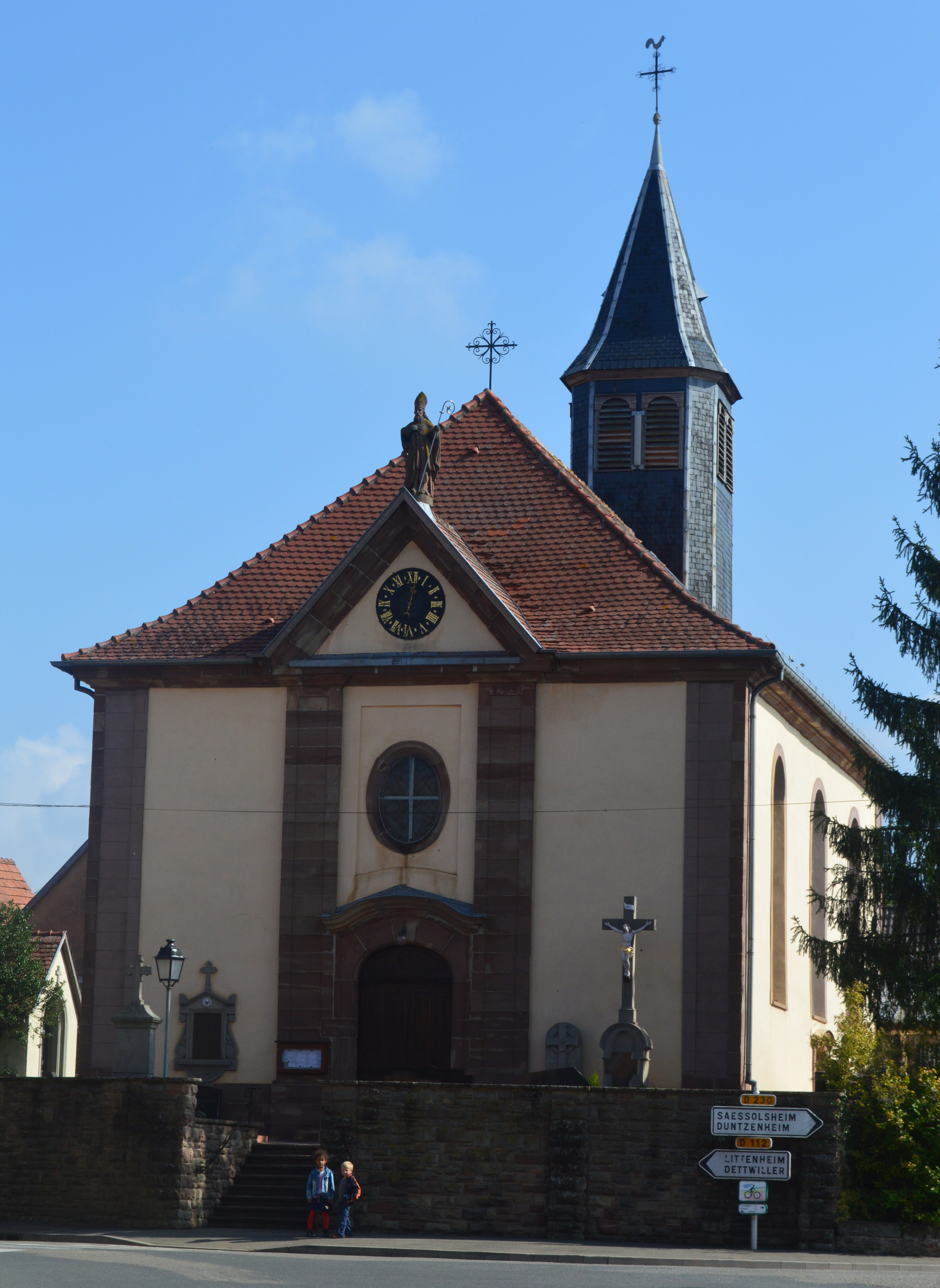
The Church of Saint Lambert

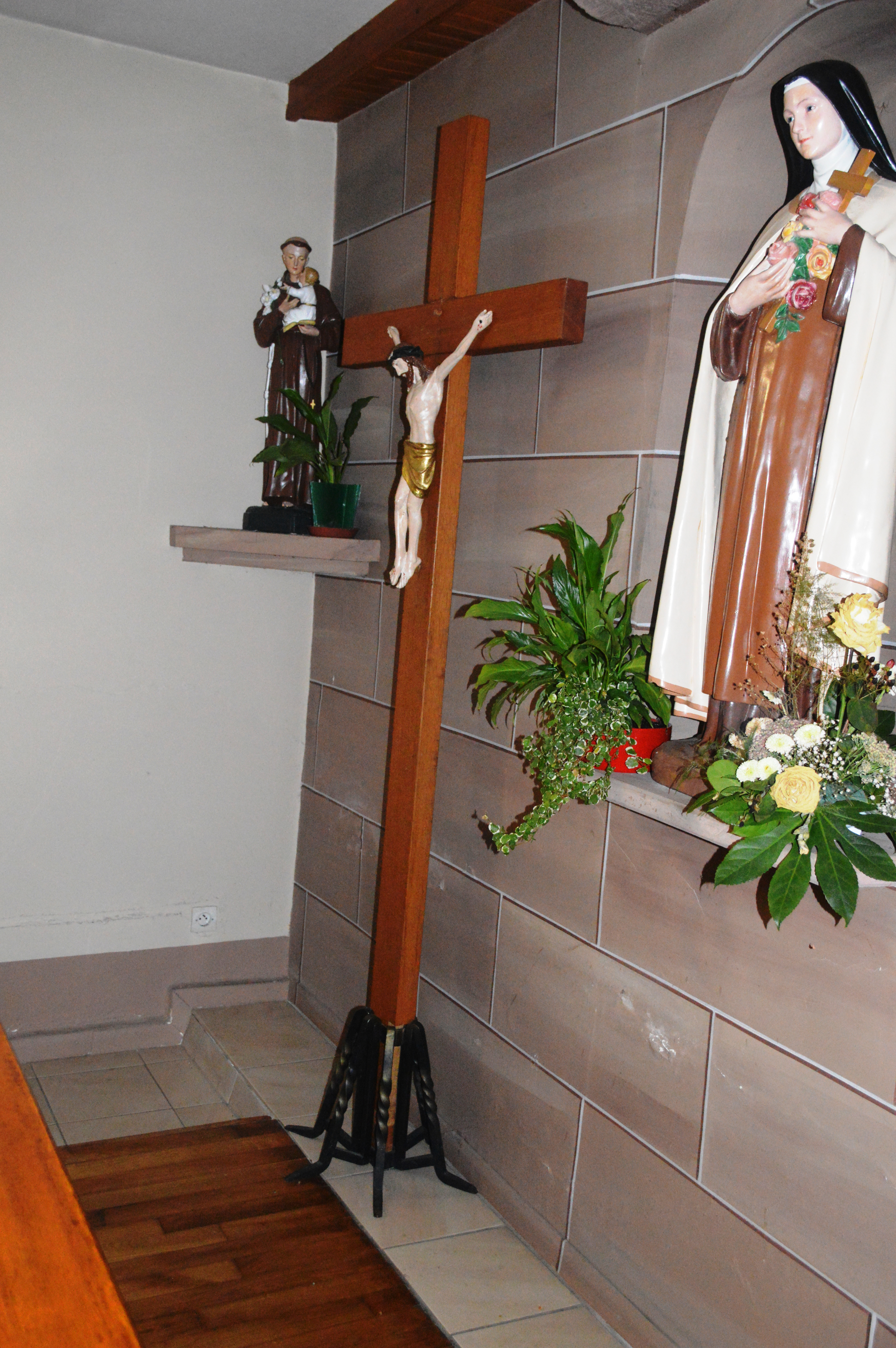
Christ on the Cross

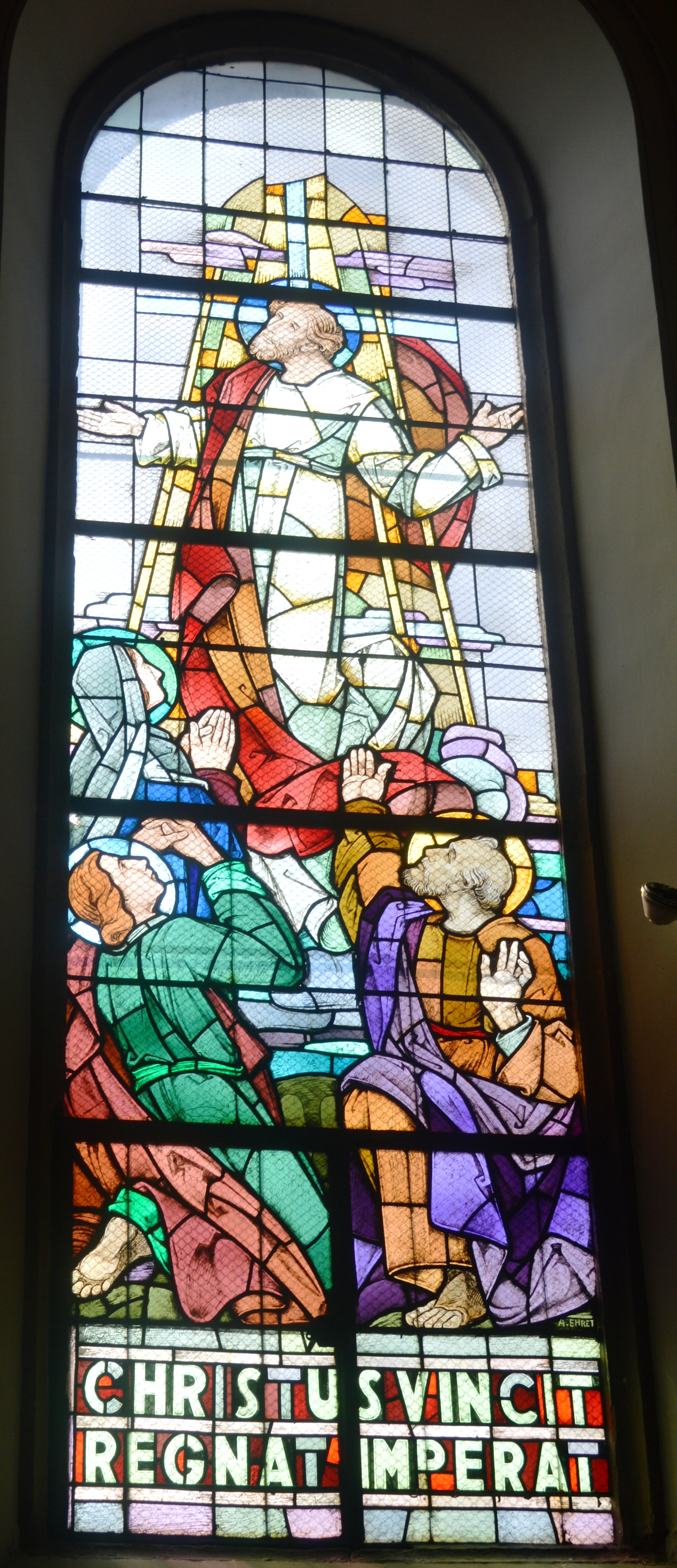
Stained Glass

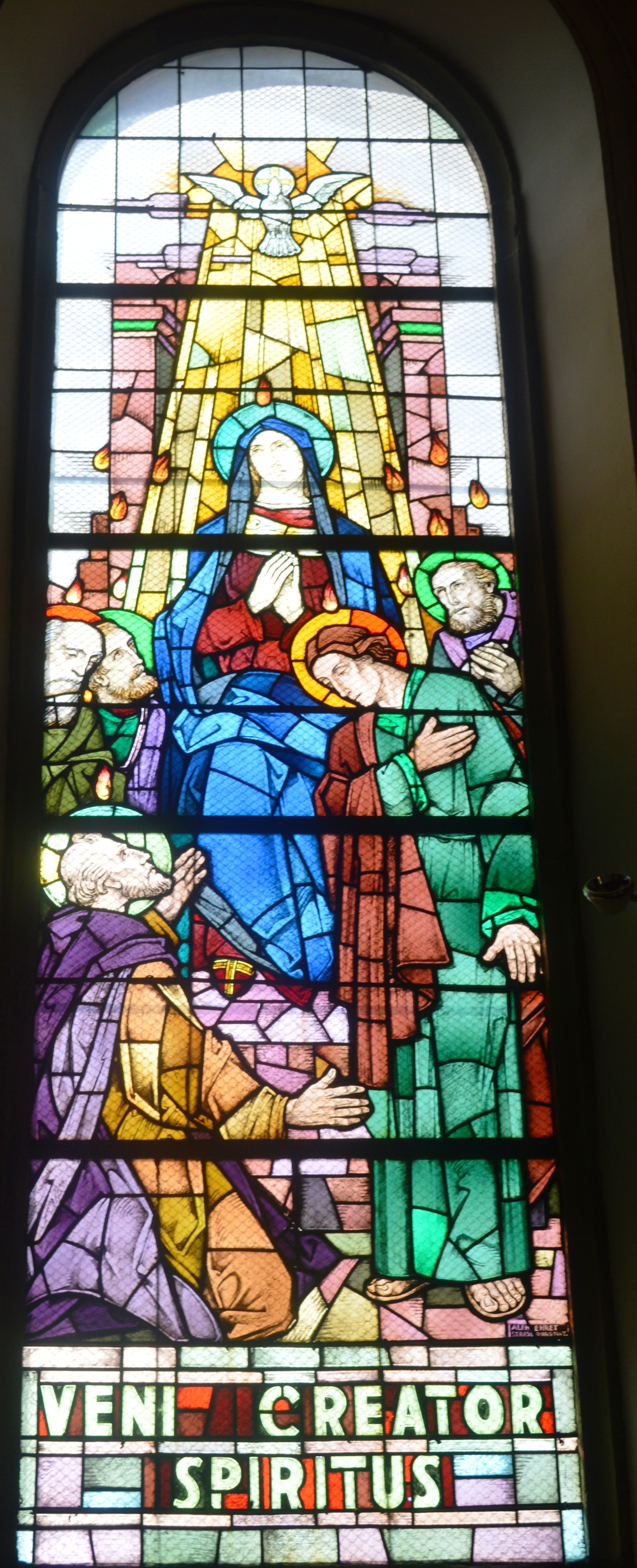
Stained Glass

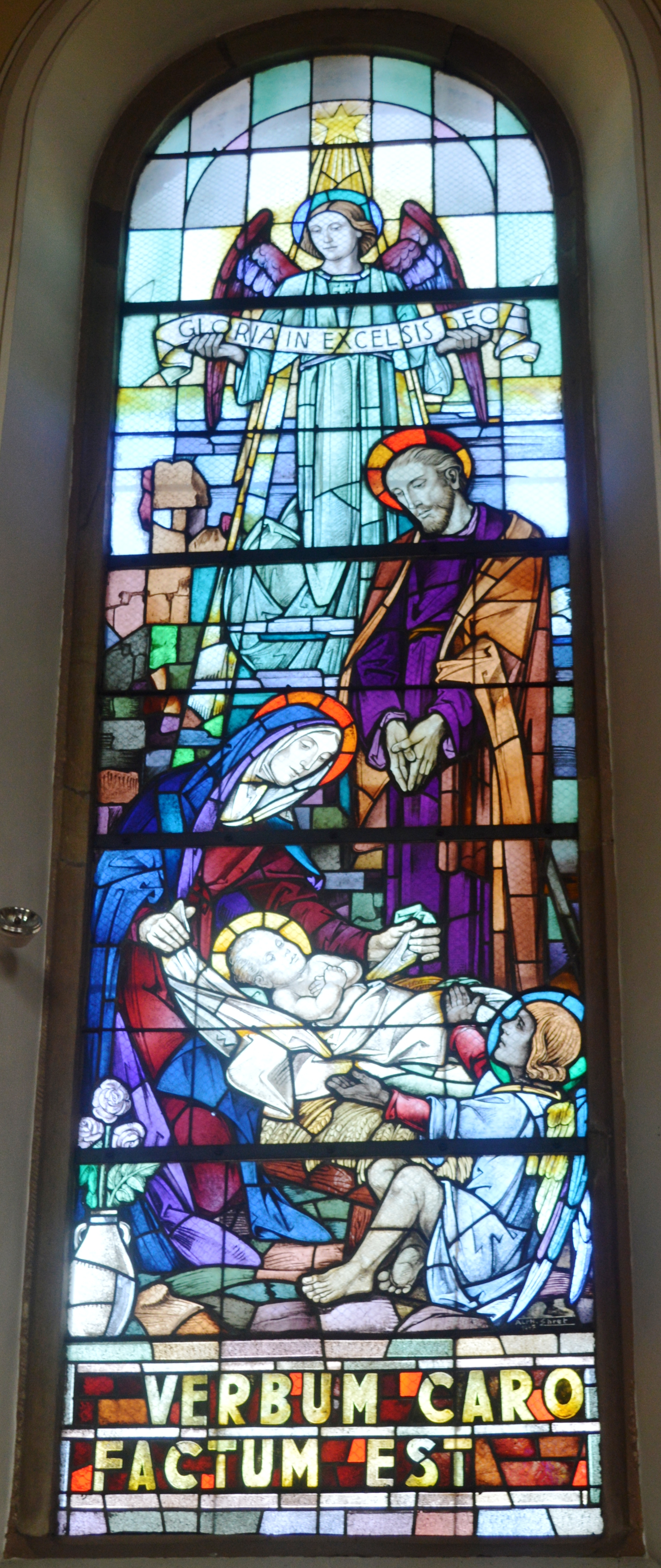
Stained Glass

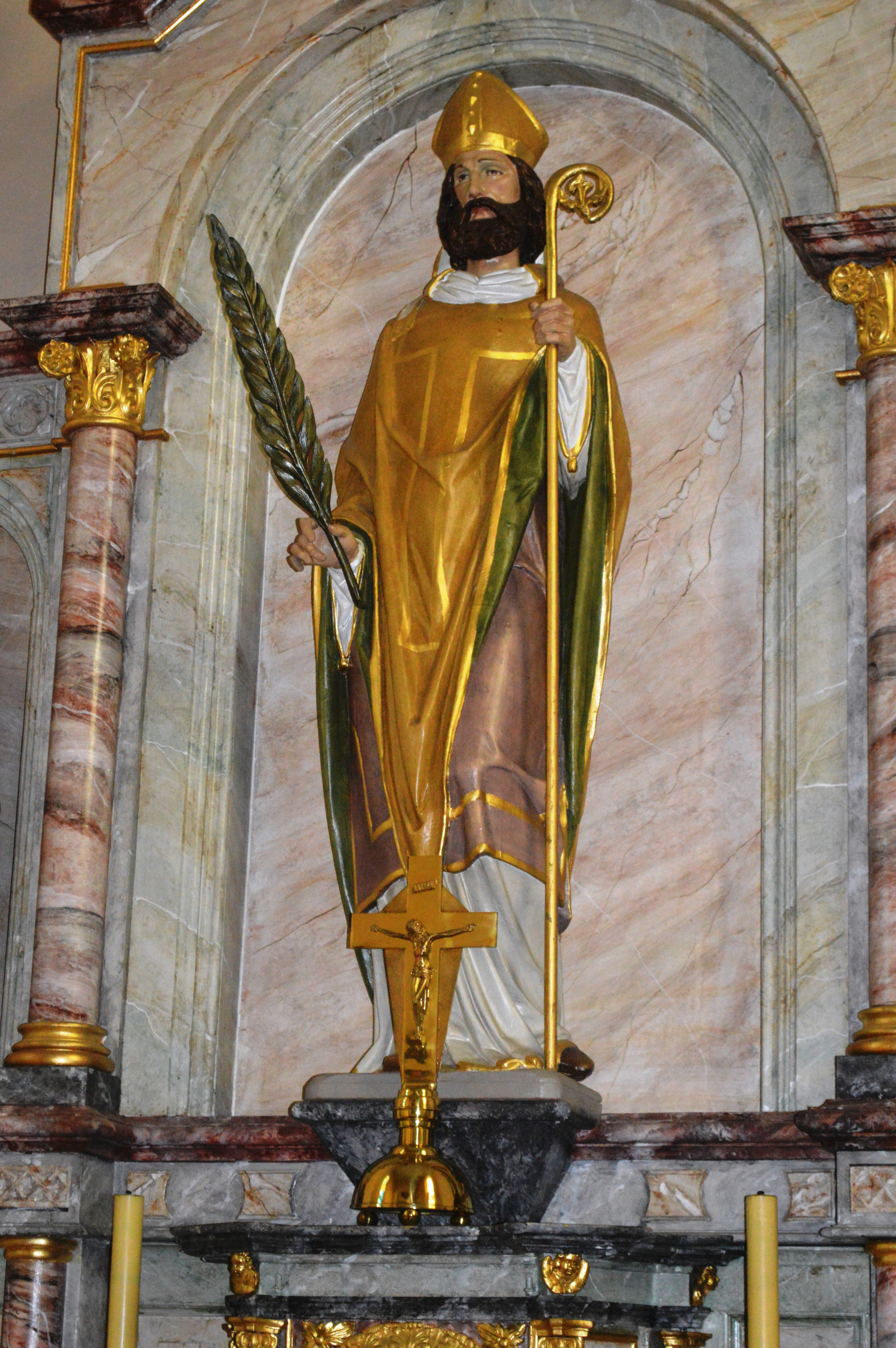
Statue of Saint Lambert

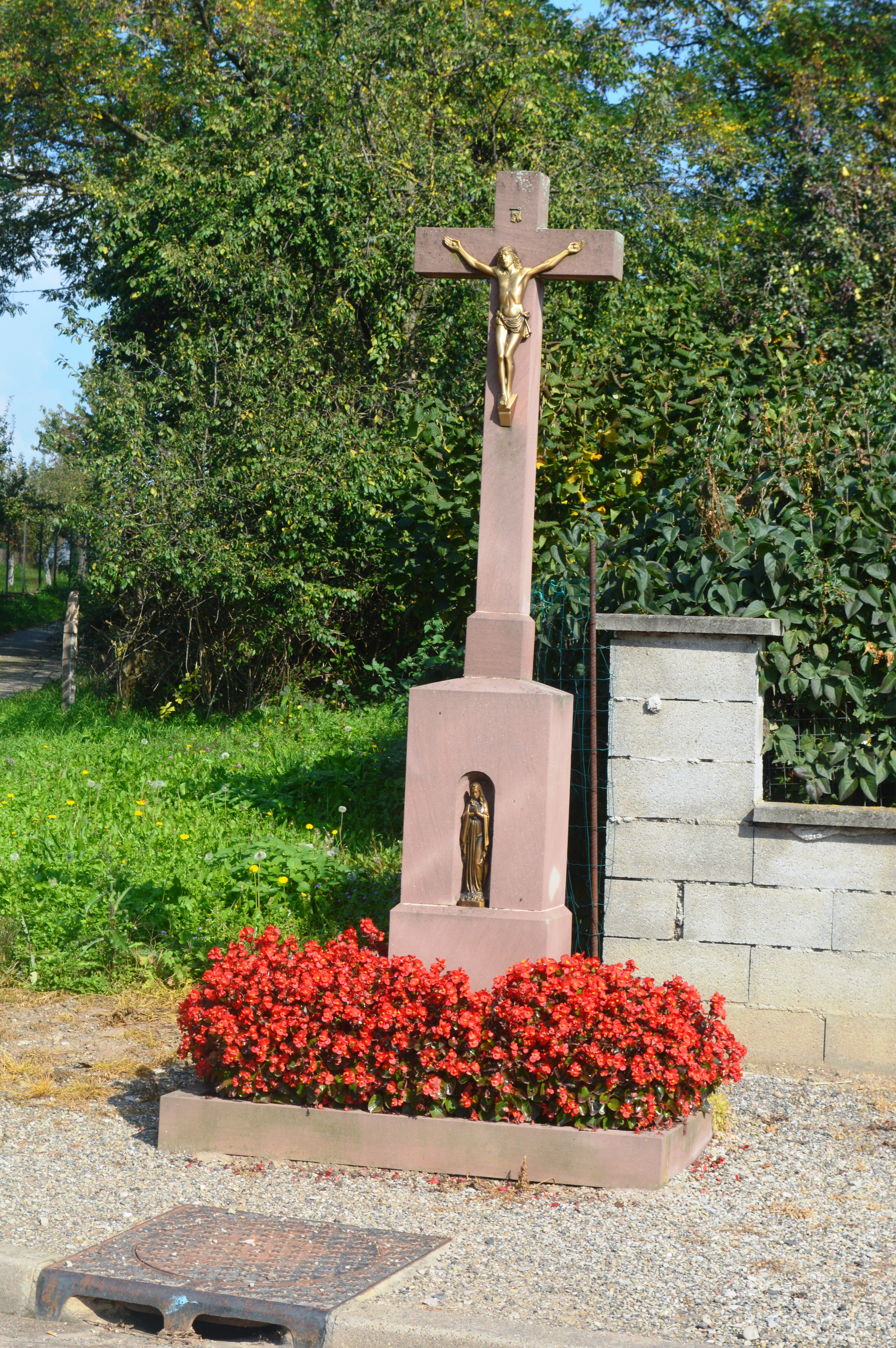
The Monumental Cross

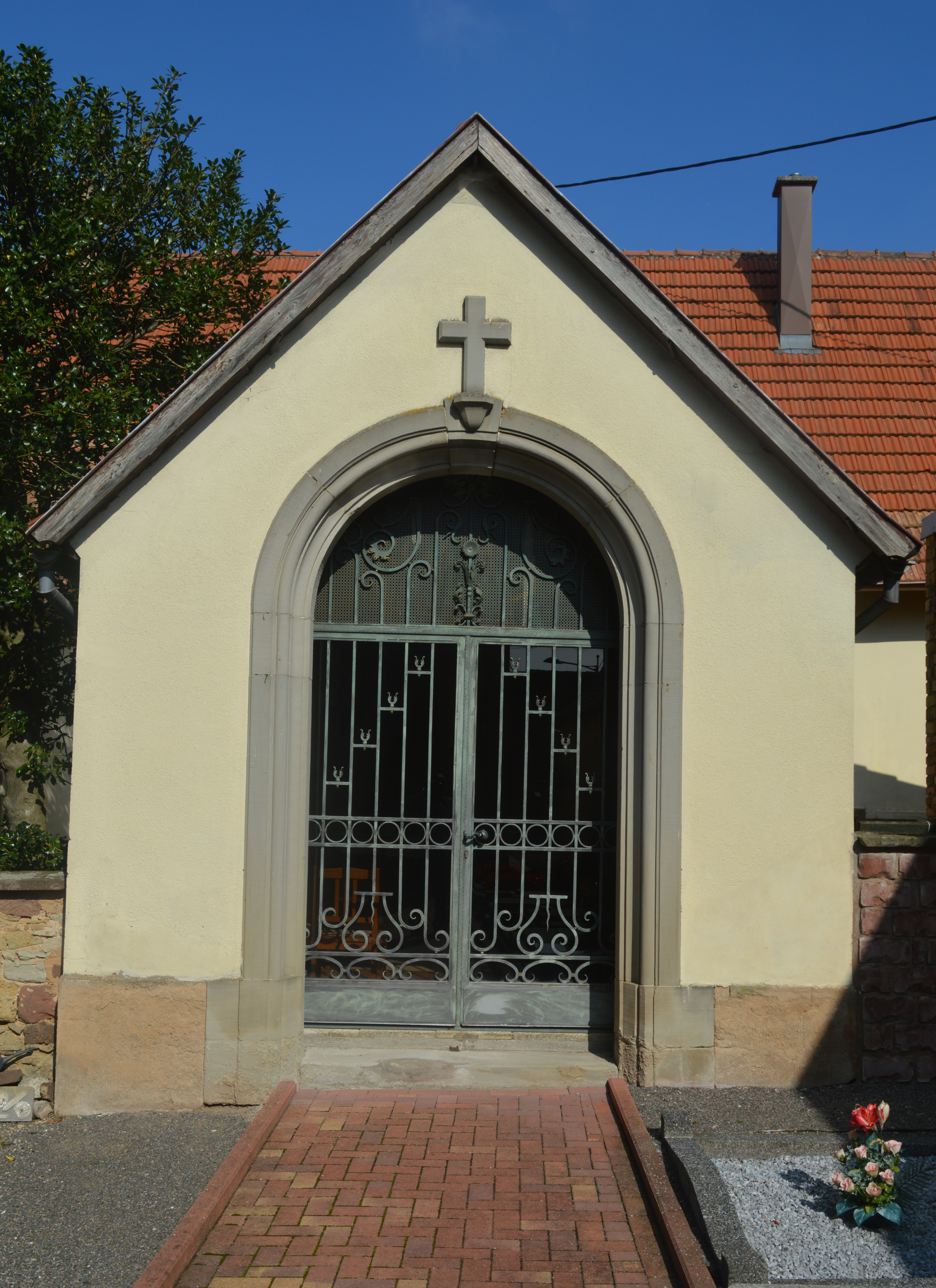
The Chapel of la-Fête-Dieu

== See also ==
- Communes of the Bas-Rhin department
