= Imbsheim =

- Associated commune of Bouxwiller
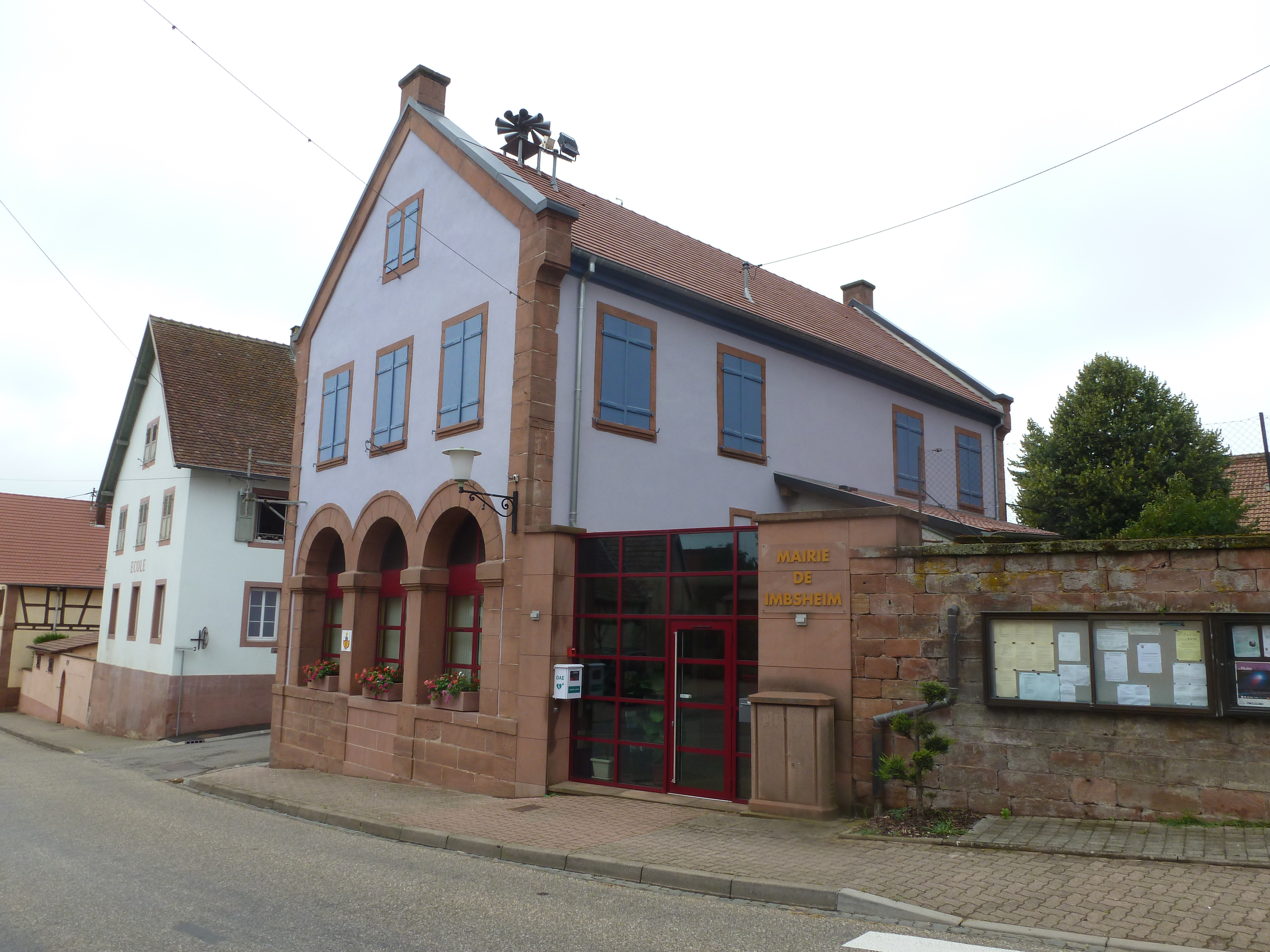
- Imbsheim Town hall
- Location of Imbsheim
- Location within France Location within Grand Est
- Coordinates: 48°48′N 7°27′E
- Country: France
- Region: Grand Est
- Department: Bas-Rhin
- Commune: Bouxwiller
- Population (2022): 527
- Time zone: UTC+01:00 (CET)
  - Summer (DST): UTC+02:00 (CEST)

Imbsheim is a village and a former commune in the Bas-Rhin department, eastern France. Since March 1, 1973, this village has been an associated commune of Bouxwiller. Its population is 527 (2022).

== Names ==
The village was mentioned in 1178 as Ummenesheim which probably comes from Umbiniacum. formed by the Paleo-European root meaning a terrain obstacle or hollow, since the village is located near Bastberg Hill.

== Heraldry ==
Upon the arms of the village is emblazoned "Coupé au premier d'argent au buste de Saint-Martin de carnation mitré et nimbé d'or, vêtu pontificalement d'azur et d'argent, bénissant de la dextre et tenant de la senestre un livre d'or, au deuxième d'or au lion de gueules et à la bordure du même."

== Nickname in Alsatian language ==
- Steinbicker (the stone miners), in reference to the quarrying of ancient stones in the hills of Bastberg.
