= Dettwiller =

- Commune
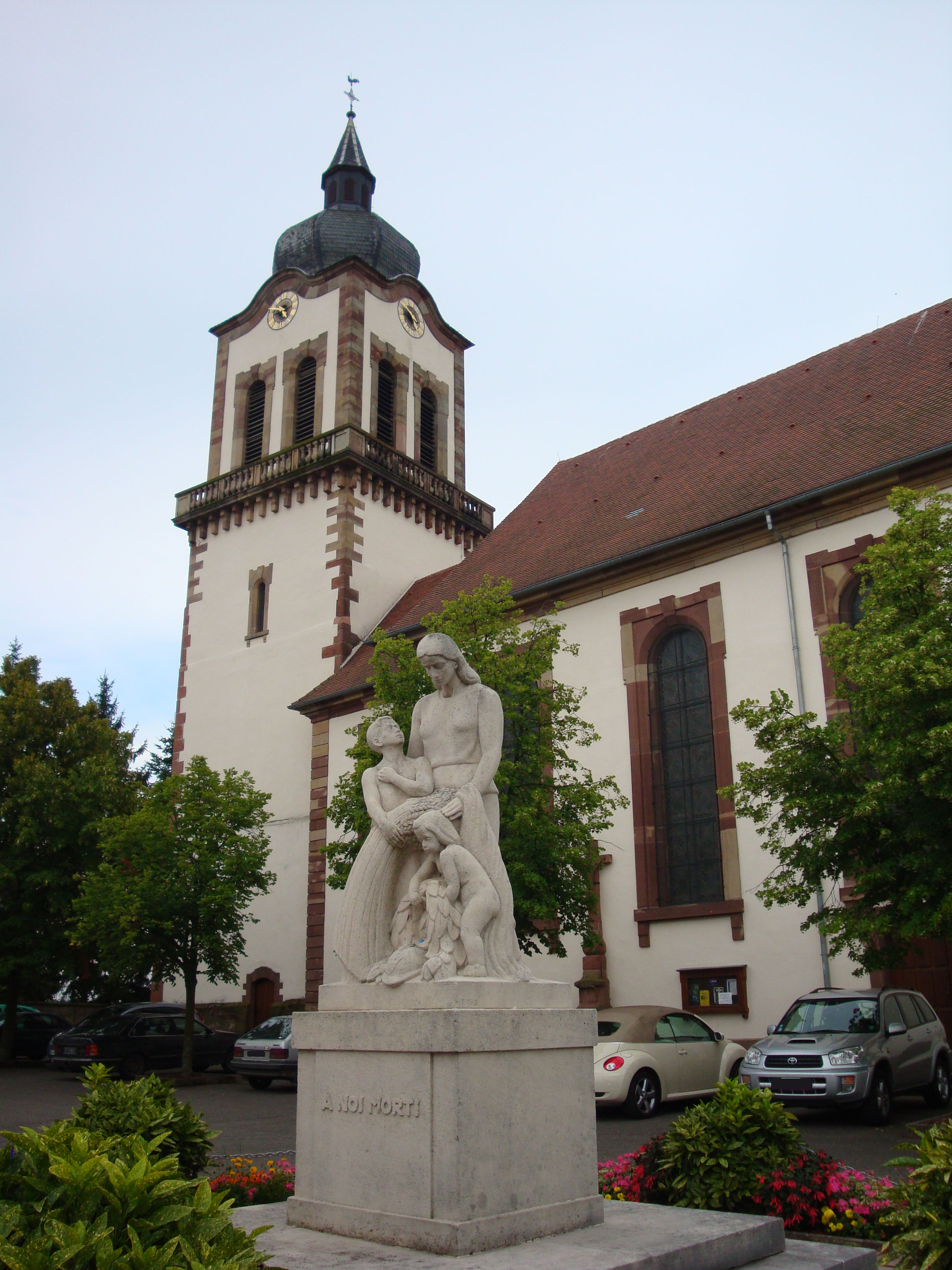
- Church in Dettwiller

- Coat of arms
- Location of Dettwiller
- Location within France Location within Grand Est
- Coordinates: 48°45′17″N 7°28′03″E
- Country: France
- Region: Grand Est
- Department: Bas-Rhin
- Arrondissement: Saverne
- Canton: Saverne

Government
  - Mayor (2024–2026): Pascal Boehm
- Area^{1}: 10.77 km^{2} (4.16 sq mi)
- Elevation: 170 m (560 ft)
- Highest elevation: 218 m (715 ft)
- Lowest elevation: 162 m (531 ft)
- Population (2023): 2,558
  - Density: 237.5/km^{2} (615.2/sq mi)
- Time zone: UTC+01:00 (CET)
  - Summer (DST): UTC+02:00 (CEST)
- INSEE/Postal code: 67089 /67490
- ^{1} French Land Register data, which excludes lakes, ponds, glaciers > 1 km^{2} (0.386 sq mi or 247 acres) and river estuaries.

Dettwiller (French pronunciation: [dɛtvilɛʁ]; German: Dettweiler) is a commune in the Bas-Rhin department in Grand Est in north-eastern France.

Dettwiller was historically known for shoe production. An Adidas factory was in operation between the 1960s into the 1980s.

== Population ==
Historical population
Year	Pop.	±% p.a.
1968	2,626	—
1975	2,743	+0.62%
1982	2,598	−0.77%
1990	2,544	−0.26%
1999	2,584	+0.17%
2007	2,596	+0.06%
2012	2,669	+0.56%
2017	2,612	−0.43%
2023	2,558	−0.35%
Source: INSEE

== See also ==
- Communes of the Bas-Rhin department
