= Arrondissement of Strasbourg-Campagne =

Coordinates: 48.58°N 7.75°E

Strasbourg-Campagne
- Former arrondissement
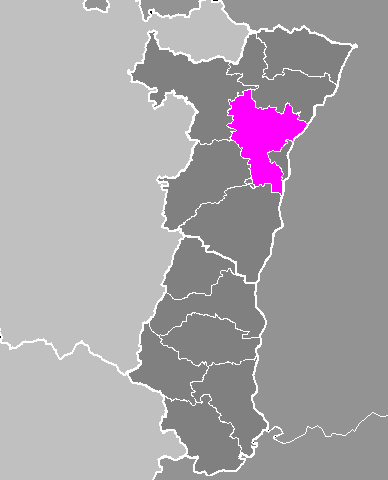
- Location within the former region Alsace
- Country: France
- Region: Grand Est
- Department: Bas-Rhin
- No. of communes: {{{nbcomm}}}
- Disbanded: 2015
- Area: 684 km^{2} (264 sq mi)
- Population (2012): 284,815
  - Density: 416/km^{2} (1,080/sq mi)

The arrondissement of Strasbourg-Campagne is a former arrondissement of France in the Bas-Rhin department in the Alsace region. It was disbanded at the 2015 arrondissements reform, and its communes were assigned to the arrondissements of Saverne, Strasbourg, Haguenau-Wissembourg and Molsheim. It had 104 communes, and its population was 284,815 (2012).

== Composition ==
The 104 communes of the arrondissement of Strasbourg-Campagne, and their INSEE codes, were:

- Achenheim (67001)
- Alteckendorf (67005)
- Bernolsheim (67033)
- Berstett (67034)
- Bietlenheim (67038)
- Bilwisheim (67039)
- Bischheim (67043)
- Blaesheim (67049)
- Bossendorf (67058)
- Breuschwickersheim (67065)
- Brumath (67067)
- Dingsheim (67097)
- Donnenheim (67100)
- Dossenheim-Kochersberg (67102)
- Duntzenheim (67107)
- Duppigheim (67108)
- Durningen (67109)
- Eckbolsheim (67118)
- Eckwersheim (67119)
- Entzheim (67124)
- Eschau (67131)
- Ettendorf (67135)
- Fegersheim (67137)
- Fessenheim-le-Bas (67138)
- Friedolsheim (67145)
- Furdenheim (67150)
- Gambsheim (67151)
- Geispolsheim (67152)
- Geiswiller (67153)
- Geudertheim (67156)
- Gingsheim (67158)
- Gougenheim (67163)
- Grassendorf (67166)
- Gries (67169)
- Griesheim-sur-Souffel (67173)
- Handschuheim (67181)
- Hangenbieten (67182)
- Hochfelden (67202)
- Hoenheim (67204)
- Hœrdt (67205)
- Hohatzenheim (67207)
- Hohfrankenheim (67209)
- Holtzheim (67212)
- Hurtigheim (67214)
- Illkirch-Graffenstaden (67218)
- Ingenheim (67220)
- Issenhausen (67225)
- Ittenheim (67226)
- Kienheim (67236)
- Kilstett (67237)
- Kolbsheim (67247)
- Krautwiller (67249)
- Kriegsheim (67250)
- Kurtzenhouse (67252)
- Kuttolsheim (67253)
- La Wantzenau (67519)
- Lampertheim (67256)
- Lingolsheim (67267)
- Lipsheim (67268)
- Lixhausen (67270)
- Melsheim (67287)
- Minversheim (67293)
- Mittelhausbergen (67296)
- Mittelhausen (67297)
- Mittelschaeffolsheim (67298)
- Mommenheim (67301)
- Mundolsheim (67309)
- Mutzenhouse (67312)
- Neugartheim-Ittlenheim (67228)
- Niederhausbergen (67326)
- Oberhausbergen (67343)
- Oberschaeffolsheim (67350)
- Olwisheim (67361)
- Osthoffen (67363)
- Ostwald (67365)
- Pfettisheim (67374)
- Pfulgriesheim (67375)
- Plobsheim (67378)
- Quatzenheim (67382)
- Reichstett (67389)
- Ringeldorf (67402)
- Ringendorf (67403)
- Rohr (67406)
- Rottelsheim (67417)
- Saessolsheim (67423)
- Schaffhouse-sur-Zorn (67439)
- Scherlenheim (67444)
- Schiltigheim (67447)
- Schnersheim (67452)
- Schwindratzheim (67460)
- Souffelweyersheim (67471)
- Stutzheim-Offenheim (67485)
- Truchtersheim (67495)
- Vendenheim (67506)
- Waltenheim-sur-Zorn (67516)
- Weyersheim (67529)
- Wickersheim-Wilshausen (67530)
- Willgottheim (67532)
- Wilwisheim (67534)
- Wingersheim (67539)
- Wintzenheim-Kochersberg (67542)
- Wiwersheim (67548)
- Wolfisheim (67551)
- Zœbersdorf (67560)

== History ==
The arrondissement of Strasbourg-Campagne was created in 1919. It was disbanded in 2015. The cantons of the arrondissement of Strasbourg-Campagne were, as of January 2015:

1. Bischheim
2. Brumath
3. Geispolsheim
4. Hochfelden
5. Illkirch-Graffenstaden
6. Mundolsheim
7. Schiltigheim
8. Truchtersheim
