= Canton of Hochfelden =

Coordinates: 48.7500°N 7.5667°E

Hochfelden
- Former canton
- Interactive map of Hochfelden
- Country: France
- Region: Grand Est
- Department: Bas-Rhin
- No. of communes: {{{nbcomm}}}
- Disbanded: 2015
- Area: 133.91 km^{2} (51.70 sq mi)
- Population (2012): 16,918
  - Density: 126.34/km^{2} (327.22/sq mi)

The canton of Hochfelden is a former canton of France, located in the Bas-Rhin department, in the Alsace region. It had 16,918 inhabitants (2012). It was disbanded following the French canton reorganisation which came into effect in March 2015. It consisted of 29 communes.

== Communes ==
The communes of the canton of Hochfelden were:

1. Alteckendorf
2. Bossendorf
3. Duntzenheim
4. Ettendorf
5. Friedolsheim
6. Geiswiller
7. Gingsheim
8. Grassendorf
9. Hochfelden
10. Hohatzenheim
11. Hohfrankenheim
12. Ingenheim
13. Issenhausen
14. Lixhausen
15. Melsheim
16. Minversheim
17. Mittelhausen
18. Mutzenhouse
19. Ringeldorf
20. Ringendorf
21. Saessolsheim
22. Schaffhouse-sur-Zorn
23. Scherlenheim
24. Schwindratzheim
25. Waltenheim-sur-Zorn
26. Wickersheim-Wilshausen
27. Wilwisheim
28. Wingersheim
29. Zœbersdorf

== See also ==
- Cantons of the Bas-Rhin department
