= Communes of the Bas-Rhin department =

The following is a list of the 514 communes of the Bas-Rhin department of France.

The communes cooperate in the following intercommunalities (as of 2025):

- Eurométropole de Strasbourg
- Communauté d'agglomération de Haguenau
- Communauté d'agglomération Sarreguemines Confluences (partly)
- Communauté de communes de l'Alsace Bossue
- Communauté de communes de la Basse Zorn
- Communauté de communes du canton d'Erstein
- Communauté de communes de Hanau-La Petite Pierre
- Communauté de communes du Kochersberg
- Communauté de communes de la Mossig et du Vignoble
- Communauté de communes de l'Outre-Forêt
- Communauté de communes du Pays de Barr
- Communauté de communes du Pays de Niederbronn-les-Bains
- Communauté de communes du Pays Rhénan
- Communauté de communes du Pays de Sainte-Odile
- Communauté de communes du Pays de Saverne
- Communauté de communes du Pays de Wissembourg
- Communauté de communes du Pays de la Zorn
- Communauté de communes de la Plaine du Rhin
- Communauté de communes des Portes de Rosheim
- Communauté de communes de la Région de Molsheim-Mutzig
- Communauté de communes du Ried de Marckolsheim (partly)
- Communauté de communes Sauer-Pechelbronn
- Communauté de communes de Sélestat
- Communauté de communes de la Vallée de la Bruche
- Communauté de communes de la Vallée de Villé

INSEE	Postal	Commune	Arrondissement	Canton
67001	67204	Achenheim	Strasbourg	Lingolsheim
67002	67320	Adamswiller	Saverne	Ingwiller
67003	67220	Albé	Sélestat-Erstein	Mutzig
67005	67270	Alteckendorf	Saverne	Bouxwiller
67006	67490	Altenheim	Saverne	Saverne
67008	67120	Altorf	Molsheim	Molsheim
67009	67260	Altwiller	Saverne	Ingwiller
67010	67140	Andlau	Sélestat-Erstein	Obernai
67011	67390	Artolsheim	Sélestat-Erstein	Sélestat
67012	67250	Aschbach	Haguenau-Wissembourg	Wissembourg
67013	67320	Asswiller	Saverne	Ingwiller
67016	67120	Avolsheim	Molsheim	Molsheim
67017	67320	Baerendorf	Saverne	Ingwiller
67018	67310	Balbronn	Molsheim	Saverne
67019	67600	Baldenheim	Sélestat-Erstein	Sélestat
67020	67130	Barembach	Molsheim	Mutzig
67021	67140	Barr	Sélestat-Erstein	Obernai
67022	67220	Bassemberg	Sélestat-Erstein	Mutzig
67023	67500	Batzendorf	Haguenau-Wissembourg	Haguenau
67025	67930	Beinheim	Haguenau-Wissembourg	Wissembourg
67026	67130	Bellefosse	Molsheim	Mutzig
67027	67130	Belmont	Molsheim	Mutzig
67028	67230	Benfeld	Sélestat-Erstein	Erstein
67029	67320	Berg	Saverne	Ingwiller
67030	67310	Bergbieten	Molsheim	Molsheim
67031	67210	Bernardswiller	Sélestat-Erstein	Obernai
67032	67140	Bernardvillé	Sélestat-Erstein	Obernai
67033	67170	Bernolsheim	Haguenau-Wissembourg	Brumath
67034	67370	Berstett	Saverne	Bouxwiller
67035	67170	Berstheim	Haguenau-Wissembourg	Haguenau
67339	67660	Betschdorf	Haguenau-Wissembourg	Wissembourg
67036	67320	Bettwiller	Saverne	Ingwiller
67037	67360	Biblisheim	Haguenau-Wissembourg	Reichshoffen
67038	67720	Bietlenheim	Haguenau-Wissembourg	Brumath
67039	67170	Bilwisheim	Haguenau-Wissembourg	Brumath
67040	67600	Bindernheim	Sélestat-Erstein	Sélestat
67043	67800	Bischheim	Strasbourg	Schiltigheim
67044	67340	Bischholtz	Saverne	Ingwiller
67045	67870	Bischoffsheim	Molsheim	Molsheim
67046	67240	Bischwiller	Haguenau-Wissembourg	Bischwiller
67047	67260	Bissert	Saverne	Ingwiller
67048	67350	Bitschhoffen	Haguenau-Wissembourg	Reichshoffen
67049	67113	Blaesheim	Strasbourg	Lingolsheim
67050	67130	Blancherupt	Molsheim	Mutzig
67051	67650	Blienschwiller	Sélestat-Erstein	Obernai
67052	67530	Bœrsch	Molsheim	Molsheim
67053	67390	Bœsenbiesen	Sélestat-Erstein	Sélestat
67054	67150	Bolsenheim	Sélestat-Erstein	Erstein
67055	67860	Boofzheim	Sélestat-Erstein	Erstein
67056	67390	Bootzheim	Sélestat-Erstein	Sélestat
67057	67330	Bosselshausen	Saverne	Bouxwiller
67058	67270	Bossendorf	Saverne	Bouxwiller
67059	67420	Bourg-Bruche	Molsheim	Mutzig
67060	67140	Bourgheim	Sélestat-Erstein	Obernai
67061	67330	Bouxwiller	Saverne	Bouxwiller
67062	67220	Breitenau	Sélestat-Erstein	Mutzig
67063	67220	Breitenbach	Sélestat-Erstein	Mutzig
67065	67112	Breuschwickersheim	Strasbourg	Lingolsheim
67066	67130	La Broque	Molsheim	Mutzig
67067	67170	Brumath	Haguenau-Wissembourg	Brumath
67069	67470	Buhl	Haguenau-Wissembourg	Wissembourg
67070	67260	Burbach	Saverne	Ingwiller
67071	67320	Bust	Saverne	Ingwiller
67068	67350	Buswiller	Saverne	Bouxwiller
67072	67430	Butten	Saverne	Ingwiller
67073	67730	Châtenois	Sélestat-Erstein	Sélestat
67074	67160	Cleebourg	Haguenau-Wissembourg	Wissembourg
67075	67510	Climbach	Haguenau-Wissembourg	Wissembourg
67076	67420	Colroy-la-Roche	Molsheim	Mutzig
67077	67310	Cosswiller	Molsheim	Saverne
67078	67310	Crastatt	Molsheim	Saverne
67079	67470	Crœttwiller	Haguenau-Wissembourg	Wissembourg
67080	67120	Dachstein	Molsheim	Molsheim
67081	67310	Dahlenheim	Molsheim	Molsheim
67082	67770	Dalhunden	Haguenau-Wissembourg	Bischwiller
67083	67110	Dambach	Haguenau-Wissembourg	Reichshoffen
67084	67650	Dambach-la-Ville	Sélestat-Erstein	Obernai
67085	67310	Dangolsheim	Molsheim	Molsheim
67086	67150	Daubensand	Sélestat-Erstein	Erstein
67087	67350	Dauendorf	Haguenau-Wissembourg	Haguenau
67088	67430	Dehlingen	Saverne	Ingwiller
67089	67490	Dettwiller	Saverne	Saverne
67090	67230	Diebolsheim	Sélestat-Erstein	Erstein
67091	67260	Diedendorf	Saverne	Ingwiller
67092	67220	Dieffenbach-au-Val	Sélestat-Erstein	Mutzig
67093	67360	Dieffenbach-lès-Wœrth	Haguenau-Wissembourg	Reichshoffen
67094	67650	Dieffenthal	Sélestat-Erstein	Sélestat
67095	67430	Diemeringen	Saverne	Ingwiller
67096	67440	Dimbsthal	Saverne	Saverne
67097	67370	Dingsheim	Saverne	Bouxwiller
67098	67190	Dinsheim-sur-Bruche	Molsheim	Mutzig
67099	67430	Domfessel	Saverne	Ingwiller
67100	67170	Donnenheim	Haguenau-Wissembourg	Brumath
67101	67120	Dorlisheim	Molsheim	Molsheim
67102	67117	Dossenheim-Kochersberg	Saverne	Bouxwiller
67103	67330	Dossenheim-sur-Zinsel	Saverne	Ingwiller
67104	67160	Drachenbronn-Birlenbach	Haguenau-Wissembourg	Wissembourg
67105	67320	Drulingen	Saverne	Ingwiller
67106	67410	Drusenheim	Haguenau-Wissembourg	Bischwiller
67107	67270	Duntzenheim	Saverne	Bouxwiller
67108	67120	Duppigheim	Molsheim	Molsheim
67109	67270	Durningen	Saverne	Bouxwiller
67110	67360	Durrenbach	Haguenau-Wissembourg	Reichshoffen
67111	67320	Durstel	Saverne	Ingwiller
67112	67120	Duttlenheim	Molsheim	Molsheim
67113	67470	Eberbach-Seltz	Haguenau-Wissembourg	Wissembourg
67115	67600	Ebersheim	Sélestat-Erstein	Sélestat
67116	67600	Ebersmunster	Sélestat-Erstein	Sélestat
67117	67700	Eckartswiller	Saverne	Saverne
67118	67201	Eckbolsheim	Strasbourg	Hœnheim
67119	67550	Eckwersheim	Strasbourg	Brumath
67120	67140	Eichhoffen	Sélestat-Erstein	Obernai
67121	67390	Elsenheim	Sélestat-Erstein	Sélestat
67123	67350	Engwiller	Haguenau-Wissembourg	Reichshoffen
67124	67960	Entzheim	Strasbourg	Lingolsheim
67125	67680	Epfig	Sélestat-Erstein	Obernai
67126	67290	Erckartswiller	Saverne	Ingwiller
67127	67120	Ergersheim	Molsheim	Molsheim
67128	67120	Ernolsheim-Bruche	Molsheim	Molsheim
67129	67330	Ernolsheim-lès-Saverne	Saverne	Saverne
67130	67150	Erstein	Sélestat-Erstein	Erstein
67131	67114	Eschau	Strasbourg	Illkirch-Graffenstaden
67132	67360	Eschbach	Haguenau-Wissembourg	Reichshoffen
67133	67320	Eschbourg	Saverne	Ingwiller
67134	67320	Eschwiller	Saverne	Ingwiller
67135	67350	Ettendorf	Saverne	Bouxwiller
67136	67320	Eywiller	Saverne	Ingwiller
67137	67640	Fegersheim	Strasbourg	Lingolsheim
67138	67117	Fessenheim-le-Bas	Saverne	Bouxwiller
67139	67310	Flexbourg	Molsheim	Molsheim
67140	67480	Forstfeld	Haguenau-Wissembourg	Bischwiller
67141	67580	Forstheim	Haguenau-Wissembourg	Reichshoffen
67142	67480	Fort-Louis	Haguenau-Wissembourg	Bischwiller
67143	67220	Fouchy	Sélestat-Erstein	Mutzig
67144	67130	Fouday	Molsheim	Mutzig
67145	67490	Friedolsheim	Saverne	Saverne
67146	67860	Friesenheim	Sélestat-Erstein	Erstein
67147	67360	Frœschwiller	Haguenau-Wissembourg	Reichshoffen
67148	67290	Frohmuhl	Saverne	Ingwiller
67149	67700	Furchhausen	Saverne	Saverne
67150	67117	Furdenheim	Saverne	Bouxwiller
67151	67760	Gambsheim	Haguenau-Wissembourg	Brumath
67152	67118	Geispolsheim	Strasbourg	Lingolsheim
67153	67270	Geiswiller-Zœbersdorf	Saverne	Bouxwiller
67154	67150	Gerstheim	Sélestat-Erstein	Erstein
67155	67140	Gertwiller	Sélestat-Erstein	Obernai
67156	67170	Geudertheim	Haguenau-Wissembourg	Brumath
67159	67320	Gœrlingen	Saverne	Ingwiller
67160	67360	Gœrsdorf	Haguenau-Wissembourg	Reichshoffen
67161	67700	Gottenhouse	Saverne	Saverne
67162	67490	Gottesheim	Saverne	Saverne
67163	67270	Gougenheim	Saverne	Bouxwiller
67164	67210	Goxwiller	Sélestat-Erstein	Obernai
67165	67130	Grandfontaine	Molsheim	Mutzig
67166	67350	Grassendorf	Saverne	Bouxwiller
67167	67190	Grendelbruch	Molsheim	Molsheim
67168	67190	Gresswiller	Molsheim	Mutzig
67169	67240	Gries	Haguenau-Wissembourg	Brumath
67172	67870	Griesheim-près-Molsheim	Molsheim	Molsheim
67173	67370	Griesheim-sur-Souffel	Saverne	Bouxwiller
67174	67110	Gumbrechtshoffen	Haguenau-Wissembourg	Reichshoffen
67176	67110	Gundershoffen	Haguenau-Wissembourg	Reichshoffen
67178	67320	Gungwiller	Saverne	Ingwiller
67177	67360	Gunstett	Haguenau-Wissembourg	Reichshoffen
67179	67700	Haegen	Saverne	Saverne
67180	67500	Haguenau	Haguenau-Wissembourg	Haguenau
67181	67117	Handschuheim	Saverne	Bouxwiller
67182	67980	Hangenbieten	Strasbourg	Lingolsheim
67183	67260	Harskirchen	Saverne	Ingwiller
67184	67690	Hatten	Haguenau-Wissembourg	Wissembourg
67185	67330	Hattmatt	Saverne	Saverne
67186	67360	Hegeney	Haguenau-Wissembourg	Reichshoffen
67187	67390	Heidolsheim	Sélestat-Erstein	Sélestat
67188	67190	Heiligenberg	Molsheim	Mutzig
67189	67140	Heiligenstein	Sélestat-Erstein	Obernai
67190	67440	Hengwiller	Saverne	Saverne
67191	67260	Herbitzheim	Saverne	Ingwiller
67192	67230	Herbsheim	Sélestat-Erstein	Erstein
67194	67850	Herrlisheim	Haguenau-Wissembourg	Bischwiller
67195	67390	Hessenheim	Sélestat-Erstein	Sélestat
67196	67600	Hilsenheim	Sélestat-Erstein	Sélestat
67197	67150	Hindisheim	Sélestat-Erstein	Erstein
67198	67290	Hinsbourg	Saverne	Ingwiller
67199	67260	Hinsingen	Saverne	Ingwiller
67200	67150	Hipsheim	Sélestat-Erstein	Erstein
67201	67320	Hirschland	Saverne	Ingwiller
67202	67270	Hochfelden	Saverne	Bouxwiller
67203	67170	Hochstett	Haguenau-Wissembourg	Haguenau
67204	67800	Hœnheim	Strasbourg	Hœnheim
67205	67720	Hœrdt	Haguenau-Wissembourg	Brumath
67206	67250	Hoffen	Haguenau-Wissembourg	Wissembourg
67208	67310	Hohengœft	Molsheim	Saverne
67209	67270	Hohfrankenheim	Saverne	Bouxwiller
67210	67140	Le Hohwald	Sélestat-Erstein	Obernai
67212	67810	Holtzheim	Strasbourg	Lingolsheim
67213	67250	Hunspach	Haguenau-Wissembourg	Wissembourg
67214	67117	Hurtigheim	Saverne	Bouxwiller
67215	67270	Huttendorf	Haguenau-Wissembourg	Haguenau
67216	67230	Huttenheim	Sélestat-Erstein	Erstein
67217	67640	Ichtratzheim	Sélestat-Erstein	Erstein
67218	67400	Illkirch-Graffenstaden	Strasbourg	Illkirch-Graffenstaden
67220	67270	Ingenheim	Saverne	Bouxwiller
67221	67250	Ingolsheim	Haguenau-Wissembourg	Wissembourg
67222	67340	Ingwiller	Saverne	Ingwiller
67223	67880	Innenheim	Sélestat-Erstein	Molsheim
67225	67330	Issenhausen	Saverne	Bouxwiller
67226	67117	Ittenheim	Saverne	Bouxwiller
67227	67140	Itterswiller	Sélestat-Erstein	Obernai
67229	67440	Jetterswiller	Molsheim	Saverne
67230	67240	Kaltenhouse	Haguenau-Wissembourg	Bischwiller
67231	67480	Kauffenheim	Haguenau-Wissembourg	Bischwiller
67232	67250	Keffenach	Haguenau-Wissembourg	Wissembourg
67233	67230	Kertzfeld	Sélestat-Erstein	Erstein
67234	67260	Keskastel	Saverne	Ingwiller
67235	67930	Kesseldorf	Haguenau-Wissembourg	Wissembourg
67236	67270	Kienheim	Saverne	Bouxwiller
67237	67840	Kilstett	Haguenau-Wissembourg	Brumath
67238	67350	Kindwiller	Haguenau-Wissembourg	Reichshoffen
67239	67600	Kintzheim	Sélestat-Erstein	Sélestat
67240	67520	Kirchheim	Molsheim	Molsheim
67241	67320	Kirrberg	Saverne	Ingwiller
67242	67330	Kirrwiller	Saverne	Bouxwiller
67244	67440	Kleingœft	Saverne	Saverne
67245	67310	Knœrsheim	Molsheim	Saverne
67246	67230	Kogenheim	Sélestat-Erstein	Erstein
67247	67120	Kolbsheim	Strasbourg	Lingolsheim
67248	67880	Krautergersheim	Sélestat-Erstein	Obernai
67249	67170	Krautwiller	Haguenau-Wissembourg	Brumath
67250	67170	Kriegsheim	Haguenau-Wissembourg	Brumath
67252	67240	Kurtzenhouse	Haguenau-Wissembourg	Brumath
67253	67520	Kuttolsheim	Saverne	Bouxwiller
67254	67250	Kutzenhausen	Haguenau-Wissembourg	Reichshoffen
67255	67220	Lalaye	Sélestat-Erstein	Mutzig
67256	67450	Lampertheim	Strasbourg	Hœnheim
67257	67250	Lampertsloch	Haguenau-Wissembourg	Reichshoffen
67258	67700	Landersheim	Saverne	Saverne
67259	67360	Langensoultzbach	Haguenau-Wissembourg	Reichshoffen
67260	67580	Laubach	Haguenau-Wissembourg	Reichshoffen
67261	67630	Lauterbourg	Haguenau-Wissembourg	Wissembourg
67263	67510	Lembach	Haguenau-Wissembourg	Reichshoffen
67264	67480	Leutenheim	Haguenau-Wissembourg	Bischwiller
67265	67340	Lichtenberg	Saverne	Ingwiller
67266	67150	Limersheim	Sélestat-Erstein	Erstein
67267	67380	Lingolsheim	Strasbourg	Lingolsheim
67268	67640	Lipsheim	Strasbourg	Lingolsheim
67269	67490	Littenheim	Saverne	Saverne
67270	67270	Lixhausen	Saverne	Bouxwiller
67271	67250	Lobsann	Haguenau-Wissembourg	Reichshoffen
67272	67440	Lochwiller	Saverne	Saverne
67273	67290	Lohr	Saverne	Ingwiller
67274	67430	Lorentzen	Saverne	Ingwiller
67275	67490	Lupstein	Saverne	Saverne
67276	67130	Lutzelhouse	Molsheim	Mutzig
67277	67390	Mackenheim	Sélestat-Erstein	Sélestat
67278	67430	Mackwiller	Saverne	Ingwiller
67279	67700	Maennolsheim	Saverne	Saverne
67280	67220	Maisonsgoutte	Sélestat-Erstein	Mutzig
67281	67390	Marckolsheim	Sélestat-Erstein	Sélestat
67282	67520	Marlenheim	Molsheim	Molsheim
67283	67440	Marmoutier	Saverne	Saverne
67285	67150	Matzenheim	Sélestat-Erstein	Erstein
67286	67210	Meistratzheim	Sélestat-Erstein	Obernai
67287	67270	Melsheim	Saverne	Bouxwiller
67288	67250	Memmelshoffen	Haguenau-Wissembourg	Wissembourg
67289	67340	Menchhoffen	Saverne	Ingwiller
67290	67250	Merkwiller-Pechelbronn	Haguenau-Wissembourg	Reichshoffen
67291	67580	Mertzwiller	Haguenau-Wissembourg	Reichshoffen
67292	67580	Mietesheim	Haguenau-Wissembourg	Reichshoffen
67293	67270	Minversheim	Saverne	Bouxwiller
67295	67140	Mittelbergheim	Sélestat-Erstein	Obernai
67296	67206	Mittelhausbergen	Strasbourg	Hœnheim
67298	67170	Mittelschaeffolsheim	Haguenau-Wissembourg	Brumath
67299	67190	Mollkirch	Molsheim	Molsheim
67300	67120	Molsheim	Molsheim	Molsheim
67301	67670	Mommenheim	Haguenau-Wissembourg	Brumath
67302	67700	Monswiller	Saverne	Saverne
67303	67360	Morsbronn-les-Bains	Haguenau-Wissembourg	Reichshoffen
67304	67350	Morschwiller	Haguenau-Wissembourg	Haguenau
67305	67470	Mothern	Haguenau-Wissembourg	Wissembourg
67306	67130	Muhlbach-sur-Bruche	Molsheim	Mutzig
67307	67350	Mulhausen	Saverne	Ingwiller
67308	67470	Munchhausen	Haguenau-Wissembourg	Wissembourg
67309	67450	Mundolsheim	Strasbourg	Hœnheim
67310	67600	Mussig	Sélestat-Erstein	Sélestat
67311	67600	Muttersholtz	Sélestat-Erstein	Sélestat
67312	67270	Mutzenhouse	Saverne	Bouxwiller
67313	67190	Mutzig	Molsheim	Mutzig
67314	67130	Natzwiller	Molsheim	Mutzig
67315	67630	Neewiller-près-Lauterbourg	Haguenau-Wissembourg	Wissembourg
67317	67220	Neubois	Sélestat-Erstein	Mutzig
67228	67370	Neugartheim-Ittlenheim	Saverne	Bouxwiller
67319	67480	Neuhaeusel	Haguenau-Wissembourg	Bischwiller
67320	67220	Neuve-Église	Sélestat-Erstein	Mutzig
67321	67130	Neuviller-la-Roche	Molsheim	Mutzig
67322	67330	Neuwiller-lès-Saverne	Saverne	Ingwiller
67324	67110	Niederbronn-les-Bains	Haguenau-Wissembourg	Reichshoffen
67325	67280	Niederhaslach	Molsheim	Mutzig
67326	67207	Niederhausbergen	Strasbourg	Hœnheim
67327	67630	Niederlauterbach	Haguenau-Wissembourg	Wissembourg
67328	67350	Niedermodern	Haguenau-Wissembourg	Reichshoffen
67329	67210	Niedernai	Sélestat-Erstein	Obernai
67330	67470	Niederrœdern	Haguenau-Wissembourg	Wissembourg
67331	67500	Niederschaeffolsheim	Haguenau-Wissembourg	Haguenau
67333	67330	Niedersoultzbach	Saverne	Ingwiller
67334	67510	Niedersteinbach	Haguenau-Wissembourg	Reichshoffen
67335	67520	Nordheim	Molsheim	Molsheim
67336	67150	Nordhouse	Sélestat-Erstein	Erstein
67337	67680	Nothalten	Sélestat-Erstein	Obernai
67338	67230	Obenheim	Sélestat-Erstein	Erstein
67340	67110	Oberbronn	Haguenau-Wissembourg	Reichshoffen
67341	67360	Oberdorf-Spachbach	Haguenau-Wissembourg	Reichshoffen
67342	67280	Oberhaslach	Molsheim	Mutzig
67343	67205	Oberhausbergen	Strasbourg	Hœnheim
67344	67160	Oberhoffen-lès-Wissembourg	Haguenau-Wissembourg	Wissembourg
67345	67240	Oberhoffen-sur-Moder	Haguenau-Wissembourg	Bischwiller
67346	67160	Oberlauterbach	Haguenau-Wissembourg	Wissembourg
67347	67330	Obermodern-Zutzendorf	Saverne	Bouxwiller
67348	67210	Obernai	Sélestat-Erstein	Obernai
67349	67250	Oberrœdern	Haguenau-Wissembourg	Wissembourg
67350	67203	Oberschaeffolsheim	Strasbourg	Lingolsheim
67352	67330	Obersoultzbach	Saverne	Bouxwiller
67353	67510	Obersteinbach	Haguenau-Wissembourg	Reichshoffen
67354	67520	Odratzheim	Molsheim	Molsheim
67355	67970	Oermingen	Saverne	Ingwiller
67356	67850	Offendorf	Haguenau-Wissembourg	Bischwiller
67358	67340	Offwiller	Haguenau-Wissembourg	Reichshoffen
67359	67590	Ohlungen	Haguenau-Wissembourg	Haguenau
67360	67390	Ohnenheim	Sélestat-Erstein	Sélestat
67361	67170	Olwisheim	Haguenau-Wissembourg	Brumath
67362	67600	Orschwiller	Sélestat-Erstein	Sélestat
67363	67990	Osthoffen	Strasbourg	Lingolsheim
67364	67150	Osthouse	Sélestat-Erstein	Erstein
67365	67540	Ostwald	Strasbourg	Illkirch-Graffenstaden
67366	67700	Ottersthal	Saverne	Saverne
67367	67700	Otterswiller	Saverne	Saverne
67368	67530	Ottrott	Molsheim	Molsheim
67369	67320	Ottwiller	Saverne	Ingwiller
67370	67290	Petersbach	Saverne	Ingwiller
67371	67290	La Petite-Pierre	Saverne	Ingwiller
67373	67320	Pfalzweyer	Saverne	Ingwiller
67375	67370	Pfulgriesheim	Saverne	Bouxwiller
67377	67420	Plaine	Molsheim	Mutzig
67378	67115	Plobsheim	Strasbourg	Illkirch-Graffenstaden
67379	67250	Preuschdorf	Haguenau-Wissembourg	Reichshoffen
67380	67490	Printzheim	Saverne	Saverne
67381	67290	Puberg	Saverne	Ingwiller
67382	67117	Quatzenheim	Saverne	Bouxwiller
67383	67310	Rangen	Molsheim	Saverne
67384	67420	Ranrupt	Molsheim	Mutzig
67385	67430	Ratzwiller	Saverne	Ingwiller
67386	67320	Rauwiller	Saverne	Ingwiller
67387	67140	Reichsfeld	Sélestat-Erstein	Obernai
67388	67110	Reichshoffen	Haguenau-Wissembourg	Reichshoffen
67389	67116	Reichstett	Strasbourg	Hœnheim
67391	67440	Reinhardsmunster	Saverne	Saverne
67392	67340	Reipertswiller	Saverne	Ingwiller
67394	67250	Retschwiller	Haguenau-Wissembourg	Wissembourg
67395	67440	Reutenbourg	Saverne	Saverne
67396	67320	Rexingen	Saverne	Ingwiller
67397	67860	Rhinau	Sélestat-Erstein	Erstein
67398	67390	Richtolsheim	Sélestat-Erstein	Sélestat
67400	67160	Riedseltz	Haguenau-Wissembourg	Wissembourg
67401	67260	Rimsdorf	Saverne	Ingwiller
67403	67350	Ringendorf	Saverne	Bouxwiller
67404	67690	Rittershoffen	Haguenau-Wissembourg	Wissembourg
67405	67480	Rœschwoog	Haguenau-Wissembourg	Bischwiller
67406	67270	Rohr	Saverne	Bouxwiller
67407	67410	Rohrwiller	Haguenau-Wissembourg	Bischwiller
67408	67310	Romanswiller	Molsheim	Saverne
67409	67480	Roppenheim	Haguenau-Wissembourg	Bischwiller
67410	67560	Rosenwiller	Molsheim	Molsheim
67411	67560	Rosheim	Molsheim	Molsheim
67412	67230	Rossfeld	Sélestat-Erstein	Erstein
67413	67290	Rosteig	Saverne	Ingwiller
67414	67570	Rothau	Molsheim	Mutzig
67415	67340	Rothbach	Haguenau-Wissembourg	Reichshoffen
67416	67160	Rott	Haguenau-Wissembourg	Wissembourg
67417	67170	Rottelsheim	Haguenau-Wissembourg	Brumath
67418	67480	Rountzenheim-Auenheim	Haguenau-Wissembourg	Bischwiller
67420	67130	Russ	Molsheim	Mutzig
67421	67420	Saales	Molsheim	Mutzig
67422	67390	Saasenheim	Sélestat-Erstein	Sélestat
67423	67270	Saessolsheim	Saverne	Saverne
67424	67420	Saint-Blaise-la-Roche	Molsheim	Mutzig
67425	67700	Saint-Jean-Saverne	Saverne	Saverne
67426	67220	Saint-Martin	Sélestat-Erstein	Mutzig
67427	67220	Saint-Maurice	Sélestat-Erstein	Mutzig
67428	67530	Saint-Nabor	Molsheim	Molsheim
67429	67140	Saint-Pierre	Sélestat-Erstein	Obernai
67430	67220	Saint-Pierre-Bois	Sélestat-Erstein	Mutzig
67432	67160	Salmbach	Haguenau-Wissembourg	Wissembourg
67433	67230	Sand	Sélestat-Erstein	Erstein
67434	67260	Sarre-Union	Saverne	Ingwiller
67435	67260	Sarrewerden	Saverne	Ingwiller
67436	67420	Saulxures	Molsheim	Mutzig
67437	67700	Saverne	Saverne	Saverne
67438	67150	Schaeffersheim	Sélestat-Erstein	Erstein
67440	67470	Schaffhouse-près-Seltz	Haguenau-Wissembourg	Wissembourg
67441	67350	Schalkendorf	Saverne	Bouxwiller
67442	67310	Scharrachbergheim-Irmstett	Molsheim	Molsheim
67443	67630	Scheibenhard	Haguenau-Wissembourg	Wissembourg
67444	67270	Scherlenheim	Saverne	Bouxwiller
67445	67750	Scherwiller	Sélestat-Erstein	Sélestat
67446	67340	Schillersdorf	Saverne	Ingwiller
67447	67300	Schiltigheim	Strasbourg	Schiltigheim
67448	67130	Schirmeck	Molsheim	Mutzig
67449	67240	Schirrhein	Haguenau-Wissembourg	Bischwiller
67450	67240	Schirrhoffen	Haguenau-Wissembourg	Bischwiller
67451	67160	Schleithal	Haguenau-Wissembourg	Wissembourg
67452	67370	Schnersheim	Saverne	Bouxwiller
67453	67390	Schœnau	Sélestat-Erstein	Sélestat
67454	67320	Schœnbourg	Saverne	Ingwiller
67455	67250	Schœnenbourg	Haguenau-Wissembourg	Wissembourg
67456	67260	Schopperten	Saverne	Ingwiller
67458	67590	Schweighouse-sur-Moder	Haguenau-Wissembourg	Haguenau
67459	67440	Schwenheim	Saverne	Saverne
67460	67270	Schwindratzheim	Saverne	Bouxwiller
67461	67390	Schwobsheim	Sélestat-Erstein	Sélestat
67351	67160	Seebach	Haguenau-Wissembourg	Wissembourg
67462	67600	Sélestat	Sélestat-Erstein	Sélestat
67463	67470	Seltz	Haguenau-Wissembourg	Wissembourg
67464	67230	Sermersheim	Sélestat-Erstein	Erstein
67465	67770	Sessenheim	Haguenau-Wissembourg	Bischwiller
67466	67160	Siegen	Haguenau-Wissembourg	Wissembourg
67467	67320	Siewiller	Saverne	Ingwiller
67468	67260	Siltzheim	Saverne	Ingwiller
67470	67130	Solbach	Molsheim	Mutzig
67004	67310	Sommerau	Saverne	Saverne
67471	67460	Souffelweyersheim	Strasbourg	Hœnheim
67472	67620	Soufflenheim	Haguenau-Wissembourg	Bischwiller
67473	67120	Soultz-les-Bains	Molsheim	Molsheim
67474	67250	Soultz-sous-Forêts	Haguenau-Wissembourg	Wissembourg
67475	67340	Sparsbach	Saverne	Ingwiller
67476	67770	Stattmatten	Haguenau-Wissembourg	Bischwiller
67477	67220	Steige	Sélestat-Erstein	Mutzig
67478	67790	Steinbourg	Saverne	Saverne
67479	67160	Steinseltz	Haguenau-Wissembourg	Wissembourg
67480	67190	Still	Molsheim	Mutzig
67481	67140	Stotzheim	Sélestat-Erstein	Obernai
67482	67000	Strasbourg	Strasbourg	Strasbourg 1-6
67483	67290	Struth	Saverne	Ingwiller
67484	67250	Stundwiller	Haguenau-Wissembourg	Wissembourg
67485	67370	Stutzheim-Offenheim	Saverne	Bouxwiller
67486	67920	Sundhouse	Sélestat-Erstein	Sélestat
67487	67250	Surbourg	Haguenau-Wissembourg	Wissembourg
67488	67320	Thal-Drulingen	Saverne	Ingwiller
67489	67440	Thal-Marmoutier	Saverne	Saverne
67490	67220	Thanvillé	Sélestat-Erstein	Mutzig
67491	67290	Tieffenbach	Saverne	Ingwiller
67492	67310	Traenheim	Molsheim	Saverne
67493	67220	Triembach-au-Val	Sélestat-Erstein	Mutzig
67494	67470	Trimbach	Haguenau-Wissembourg	Wissembourg
67495	67370	Truchtersheim	Saverne	Bouxwiller
67497	67350	Uhlwiller	Haguenau-Wissembourg	Haguenau
67498	67350	Uhrwiller	Haguenau-Wissembourg	Reichshoffen
67499	67220	Urbeis	Sélestat-Erstein	Mutzig
67500	67280	Urmatt	Molsheim	Mutzig
67501	67150	Uttenheim	Sélestat-Erstein	Erstein
67502	67110	Uttenhoffen	Haguenau-Wissembourg	Reichshoffen
67503	67330	Uttwiller	Saverne	Bouxwiller
67372	67350	Val-de-Moder	Haguenau-Wissembourg	Reichshoffen, Bouxwiller
67504	67210	Valff	Sélestat-Erstein	Obernai
67505	67730	La Vancelle	Sélestat-Erstein	Sélestat
67506	67550	Vendenheim	Strasbourg	Brumath
67507	67220	Villé	Sélestat-Erstein	Mutzig
67508	67430	Vœllerdingen	Saverne	Ingwiller
67509	67290	Volksberg	Saverne	Ingwiller
67510	67170	Wahlenheim	Haguenau-Wissembourg	Haguenau
67511	67360	Walbourg	Haguenau-Wissembourg	Reichshoffen
67513	67130	Waldersbach	Molsheim	Mutzig
67514	67430	Waldhambach	Saverne	Ingwiller
67515	67700	Waldolwisheim	Saverne	Saverne
67516	67670	Waltenheim-sur-Zorn	Saverne	Bouxwiller
67517	67520	Wangen	Molsheim	Molsheim
67122	67710	Wangenbourg-Engenthal	Molsheim	Saverne
67519	67610	La Wantzenau	Strasbourg	Brumath
67520	67310	Wasselonne	Molsheim	Saverne
67521	67340	Weinbourg	Saverne	Ingwiller
67522	67290	Weislingen	Saverne	Ingwiller
67523	67500	Weitbruch	Haguenau-Wissembourg	Brumath
67524	67340	Weiterswiller	Saverne	Ingwiller
67525	67310	Westhoffen	Molsheim	Saverne
67526	67230	Westhouse	Sélestat-Erstein	Erstein
67527	67440	Westhouse-Marmoutier	Saverne	Saverne
67528	67320	Weyer	Saverne	Ingwiller
67529	67720	Weyersheim	Haguenau-Wissembourg	Brumath
67530	67270	Wickersheim-Wilshausen	Saverne	Bouxwiller
67531	67130	Wildersbach	Molsheim	Mutzig
67532	67370	Willgottheim	Saverne	Bouxwiller
67534	67270	Wilwisheim	Saverne	Bouxwiller
67535	67290	Wimmenau	Saverne	Ingwiller
67536	67110	Windstein	Haguenau-Wissembourg	Reichshoffen
67537	67510	Wingen	Haguenau-Wissembourg	Reichshoffen
67538	67290	Wingen-sur-Moder	Saverne	Ingwiller
67539	67170	Wingersheim-les-Quatre-Bans	Saverne	Bouxwiller
67540	67590	Wintershouse	Haguenau-Wissembourg	Haguenau
67541	67470	Wintzenbach	Haguenau-Wissembourg	Wissembourg
67542	67370	Wintzenheim-Kochersberg	Saverne	Bouxwiller
67543	67130	Wisches	Molsheim	Mutzig
67544	67160	Wissembourg	Haguenau-Wissembourg	Wissembourg
67545	67230	Witternheim	Sélestat-Erstein	Erstein
67546	67670	Wittersheim	Haguenau-Wissembourg	Haguenau
67547	67820	Wittisheim	Sélestat-Erstein	Sélestat
67548	67370	Wiwersheim	Saverne	Bouxwiller
67550	67360	Wœrth	Haguenau-Wissembourg	Reichshoffen
67551	67202	Wolfisheim	Strasbourg	Hœnheim
67552	67260	Wolfskirchen	Saverne	Ingwiller
67553	67700	Wolschheim	Saverne	Saverne
67554	67120	Wolxheim	Molsheim	Molsheim
67555	67310	Zehnacker	Molsheim	Saverne
67556	67310	Zeinheim	Molsheim	Saverne
67557	67140	Zellwiller	Sélestat-Erstein	Obernai
67558	67110	Zinswiller	Haguenau-Wissembourg	Reichshoffen
67559	67290	Zittersheim	Saverne	Ingwiller

== See also ==
- Arrondissements of the Bas-Rhin department
- Cantons of the Bas-Rhin department
- Lists of communes of France
- Administrative divisions of France
