= Bischheim =

Bischheim may refer to:

- Bischheim, Germany, a municipality in Rhineland-Palatinate, Germany
- Bischheim, a village in the municipality of Haselbachtal, Saxony, Germany
- Bischheim, Bas-Rhin, a municipality in Alsace, France
- Canton of Bischheim, a former canton in Alsace, France
