= Bissert =

Bissert Bìssert
- Commune
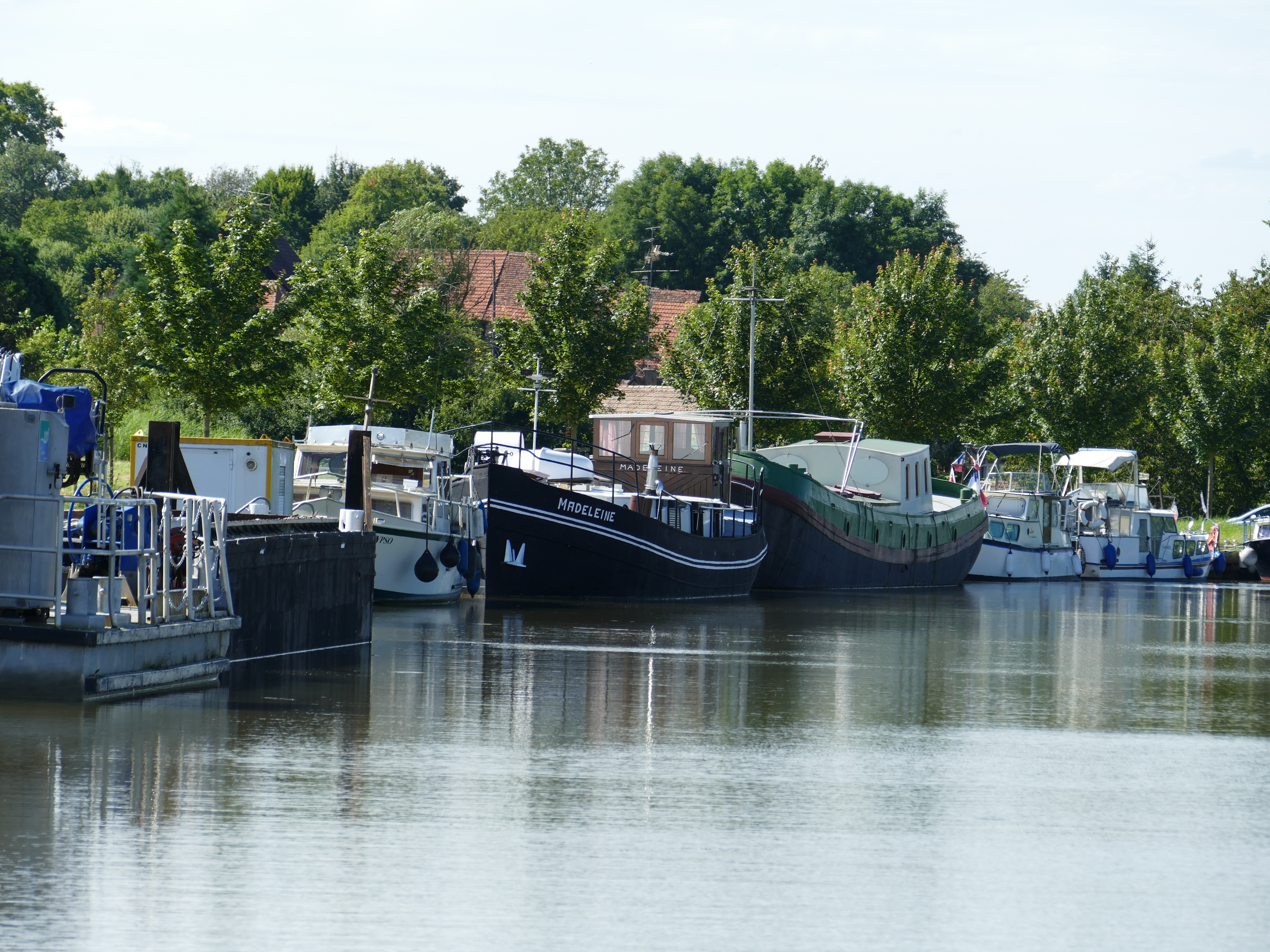
- The moorings in Bissert

- Coat of arms
- Location of Bissert
- Location within France Location within Grand Est
- Coordinates: 48°56′34″N 7°01′28″E
- Country: France
- Region: Grand Est
- Department: Bas-Rhin
- Arrondissement: Saverne
- Canton: Ingwiller

Government
  - Mayor (2020–2026): Francis Schorung
- Area^{1}: 3.37 km^{2} (1.30 sq mi)
- Highest elevation: 258 m (846 ft)
- Lowest elevation: 213 m (699 ft)
- Population (2023): 153
  - Density: 45.4/km^{2} (118/sq mi)
- Time zone: UTC+01:00 (CET)
  - Summer (DST): UTC+02:00 (CEST)
- INSEE/Postal code: 67047 /67260
- ^{1} French Land Register data, which excludes lakes, ponds, glaciers > 1 km^{2} (0.386 sq mi or 247 acres) and river estuaries.

Bissert is a commune in the Bas-Rhin department in Grand Est in northeastern France.

== Population ==
Historical population
Year	Pop.	±% p.a.
1968	190	—
1975	174	−1.25%
1982	135	−3.56%
1990	133	−0.19%
1999	157	+1.86%
2007	144	−1.07%
2012	159	+2.00%
2017	155	−0.51%
2023	153	−0.22%
Source: INSEE

== See also ==
- Communes of the Bas-Rhin department
