= Canton of Bischheim =

Coordinates: 48.6167°N 7.7500°E

Bischheim
- Former canton
- Interactive map of Bischheim
- Country: France
- Region: Grand Est
- Department: Bas-Rhin
- No. of communes: {{{nbcomm}}}
- Disbanded: 2015
- Area: 7.83 km^{2} (3.02 sq mi)
- Population (2012): 28,522
  - Density: 3,640/km^{2} (9,430/sq mi)

The Canton of Bischheim is a former canton in Alsace, France. It had 28,522 inhabitants (2012). It consisted of two municipalities: Bischheim and Hoenheim.

This canton was founded on March 4, 1790 as part of the District of Strasbourg. With the founding of arrondissements in 1800, Bischheim was merged into the Arrondissement of Strasbourg. On June 28, 1900 the canton became part of the Arrondissement of Strasbourg-Campagne. It was disbanded following the French canton reorganisation which came into effect in March 2015.

To the north the canton of Bischheim bordered with the canton of Mundolsheim and to the south with the canton of Schiltigheim.
