= Obersoultzbach =

Obersoultzbach Owersulzbàch
- Commune
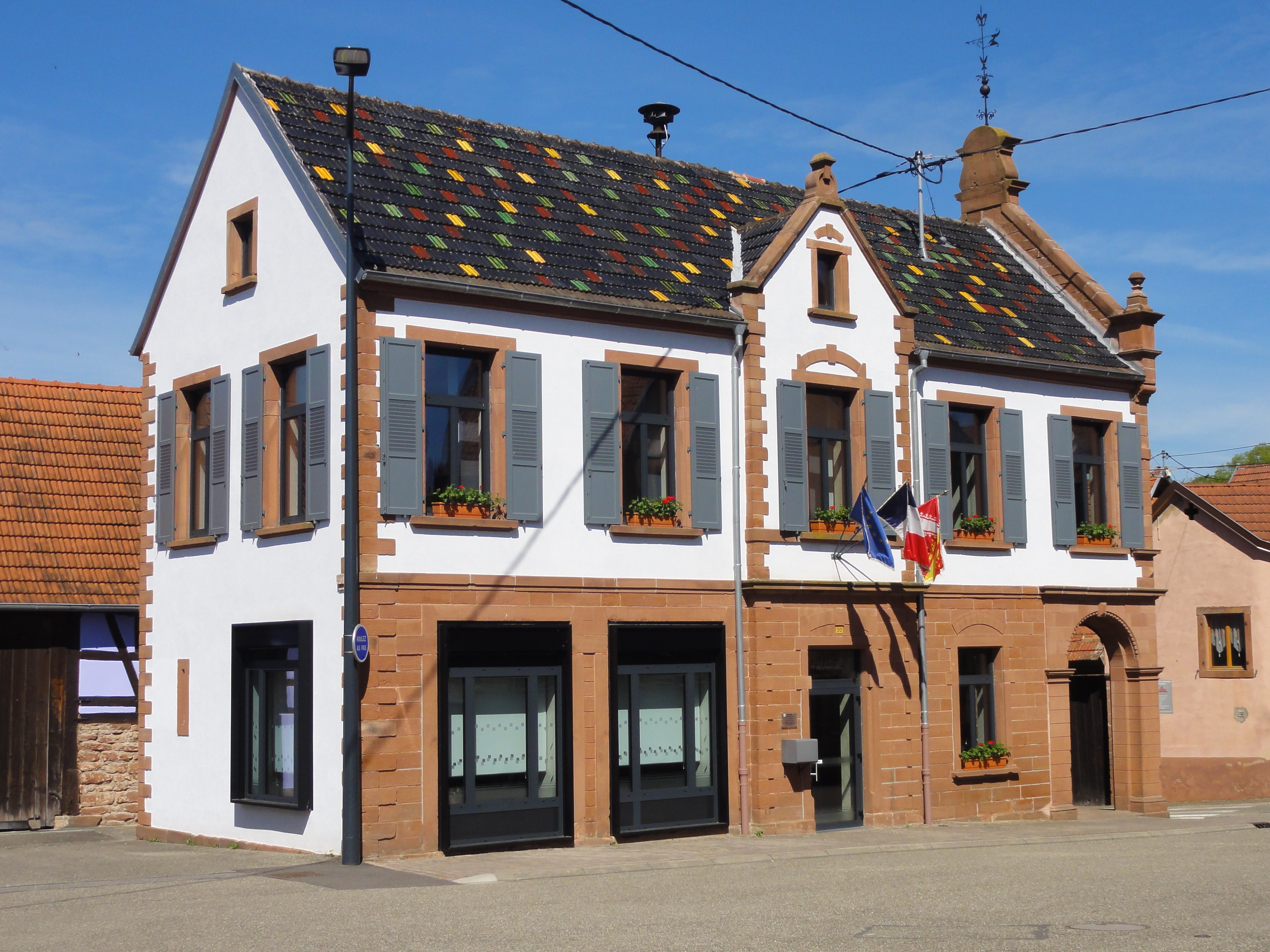
- The town hall in Obersoultzbach

- Coat of arms
- Location of Obersoultzbach
- Location within France Location within Grand Est
- Coordinates: 48°51′08″N 7°27′01″E
- Country: France
- Region: Grand Est
- Department: Bas-Rhin
- Arrondissement: Saverne
- Canton: Bouxwiller
- Intercommunality: Hanau-La Petite Pierre

Government
  - Mayor (2020–2026): Richard Muller
- Area^{1}: 5.16 km^{2} (1.99 sq mi)
- Highest elevation: 239 m (784 ft)
- Lowest elevation: 195 m (640 ft)
- Population (2023): 386
  - Density: 74.8/km^{2} (194/sq mi)
- Time zone: UTC+01:00 (CET)
  - Summer (DST): UTC+02:00 (CEST)
- INSEE/Postal code: 67352 /67330
- ^{1} French Land Register data, which excludes lakes, ponds, glaciers > 1 km^{2} (0.386 sq mi or 247 acres) and river estuaries.

Obersoultzbach (Owersulzbàch in Alsatian) is a commune in the Bas-Rhin department and Grand Est region of north-eastern France.

== See also ==
- Communes of the Bas-Rhin department
