= Buswiller =

Buswiller Büswiller
- Commune
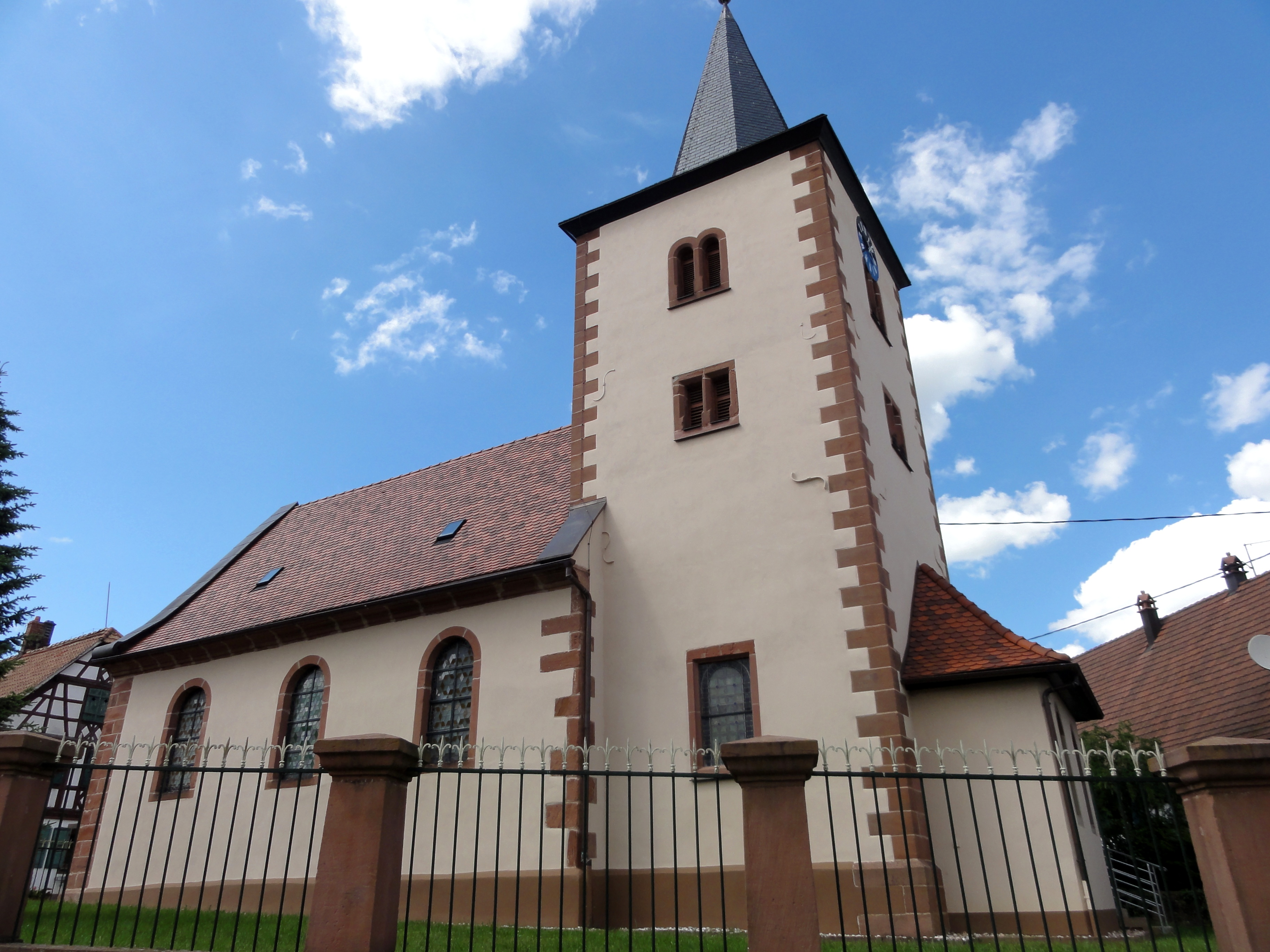
- The Protestant church in Buswiller

- Coat of arms
- Location of Buswiller
- Location within France Location within Grand Est
- Coordinates: 48°49′14″N 7°33′36″E
- Country: France
- Region: Grand Est
- Department: Bas-Rhin
- Arrondissement: Saverne
- Canton: Bouxwiller

Government
  - Mayor (2020–2026): Daniel Etter
- Area^{1}: 2.3 km^{2} (0.89 sq mi)
- Highest elevation: 275 m (902 ft)
- Lowest elevation: 199 m (653 ft)
- Population (2023): 281
  - Density: 120/km^{2} (320/sq mi)
- Time zone: UTC+01:00 (CET)
  - Summer (DST): UTC+02:00 (CEST)
- INSEE/Postal code: 67068 /67350
- ^{1} French Land Register data, which excludes lakes, ponds, glaciers > 1 km^{2} (0.386 sq mi or 247 acres) and river estuaries.

Buswiller (French pronunciation: [bysvilɛr]; German: Büsweiler) is a commune in the Bas-Rhin department in Grand Est in north-eastern France.

== See also ==
- Communes of the Bas-Rhin department
