= Ingenheim =

Ingenheim Íngne
- Commune
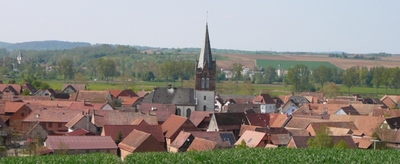
- A general view of Ingenheim

- Coat of arms
- Location of Ingenheim
- Location within France Location within Grand Est
- Coordinates: 48°44′07″N 7°31′17″E
- Country: France
- Region: Grand Est
- Department: Bas-Rhin
- Arrondissement: Saverne
- Canton: Bouxwiller

Government
  - Mayor (2020–2026): Gérard Schweitzer
- Area^{1}: 5.37 km^{2} (2.07 sq mi)
- Highest elevation: 229 m (751 ft)
- Lowest elevation: 157 m (515 ft)
- Population (2023): 376
  - Density: 70.0/km^{2} (181/sq mi)
- Time zone: UTC+01:00 (CET)
  - Summer (DST): UTC+02:00 (CEST)
- INSEE/Postal code: 67220 /67270
- ^{1} French Land Register data, which excludes lakes, ponds, glaciers > 1 km^{2} (0.386 sq mi or 247 acres) and river estuaries.

Ingenheim (French pronunciation: [iŋ(ɡ)ənaim]; Alsatian: Íngne) is a commune in the Bas-Rhin department in Grand Est in north-eastern France.

== The name ==
The earliest surviving record dates from 739 and names the village Ingenhaim. The first two syllables may comes from the Germanic given/Christian name, "Ingo". "Heim" occurs frequently in place names in countries where the local language is or has been a dialect of German: it is from the same root as the English word "home" and may refer to a grouping of houses or to a farmstead.

== History ==
Between 1802 and 1853 the village was the centre for a consistory for Protestant communities in the surrounding settlements of Dettwiller, Ernolsheim-lès-Saverne, Schwindratzheim, Alteckendorf, Waltenheim-sur-Zorn and Duntzenheim. It lost out to Schwindratzheim after 1852 when the parish replaced the consistory as the defining organisational unit for protestant churches in France.

== Landmarks ==
The Protestant church, completed in 1911.

== See also ==
- Communes of the Bas-Rhin department
