= Bettwiller =

- Commune
- Coat of arms
- Location of Bettwiller
- Location within France Location within Grand Est
- Coordinates: 48°53′14″N 7°10′48″E
- Country: France
- Region: Grand Est
- Department: Bas-Rhin
- Arrondissement: Saverne
- Canton: Ingwiller

Government
  - Mayor (2020–2026): Gilbert Holtzscherer
- Area^{1}: 4.06 km^{2} (1.57 sq mi)
- Highest elevation: 351 m (1,152 ft)
- Lowest elevation: 248 m (814 ft)
- Population (2023): 299
  - Density: 73.6/km^{2} (191/sq mi)
- Time zone: UTC+01:00 (CET)
  - Summer (DST): UTC+02:00 (CEST)
- INSEE/Postal code: 67036 /67320
- ^{1} French Land Register data, which excludes lakes, ponds, glaciers > 1 km^{2} (0.386 sq mi or 247 acres) and river estuaries.

Bettwiller (French pronunciation: [bɛtvilɛʁ]; German: Bettweiler) is a commune in the Bas-Rhin department in Grand Est in northeastern France.

== Population ==
Historical population
Year	Pop.	±% p.a.
1968	283	—
1975	302	+0.93%
1982	332	+1.36%
1990	347	+0.55%
1999	332	−0.49%
2007	338	+0.22%
2012	321	−1.03%
2017	308	−0.82%
2023	299	−0.49%
Source: INSEE

== See also ==
- Communes of the Bas-Rhin department
