= Schalkendorf =

Schalkendorf Schàlkedorf
- Commune
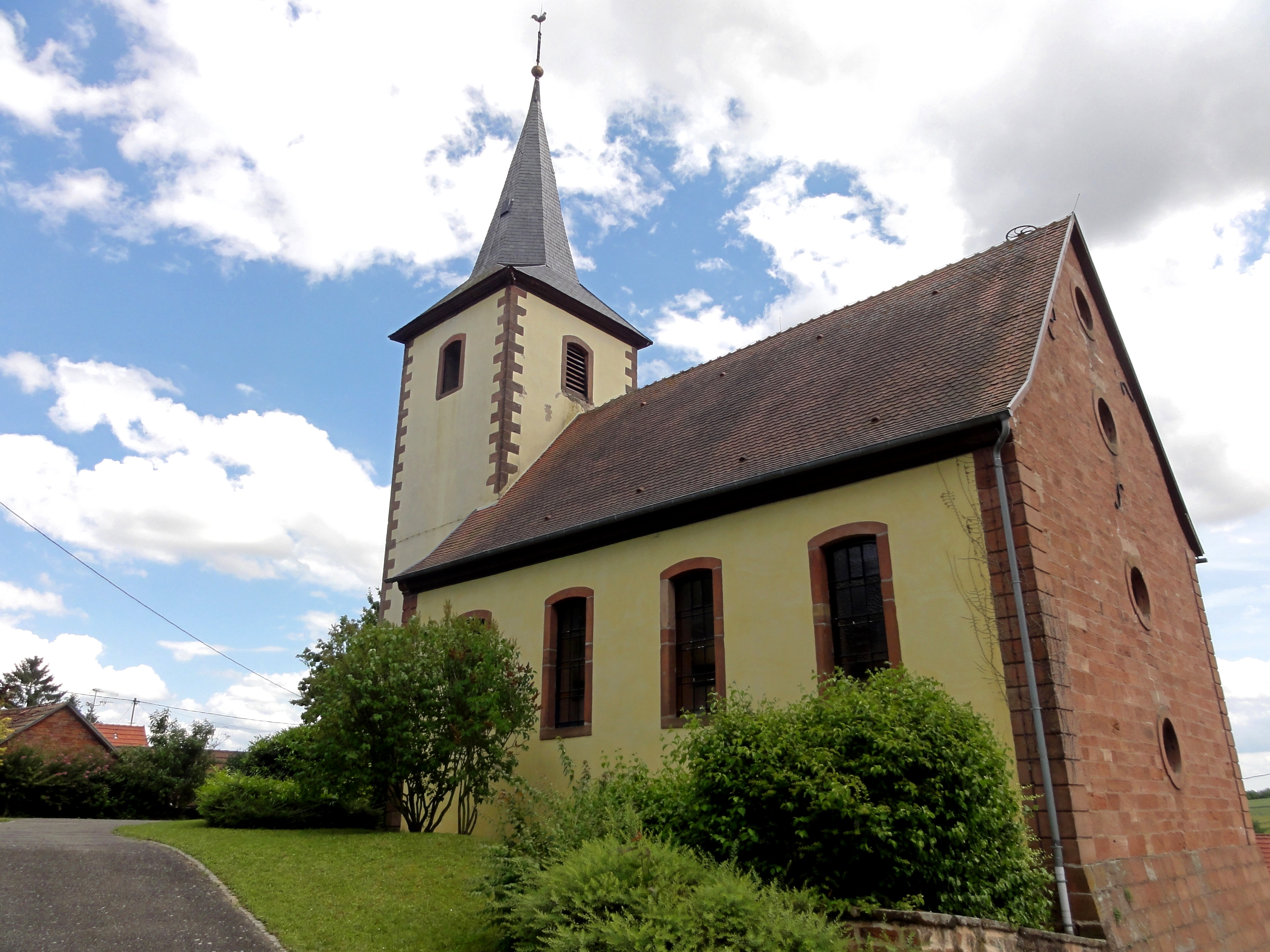
- The Protestant church in Schalkendorf

- Coat of arms
- Location of Schalkendorf
- Location within France Location within Grand Est
- Coordinates: 48°50′00″N 7°33′45″E
- Country: France
- Region: Grand Est
- Department: Bas-Rhin
- Arrondissement: Saverne
- Canton: Bouxwiller
- Intercommunality: Hanau-La Petite Pierre

Government
  - Mayor (2020–2026): Bernard Krieger
- Area^{1}: 5.21 km^{2} (2.01 sq mi)
- Highest elevation: 272 m (892 ft)
- Lowest elevation: 167 m (548 ft)
- Population (2023): 335
  - Density: 64.3/km^{2} (167/sq mi)
- Time zone: UTC+01:00 (CET)
  - Summer (DST): UTC+02:00 (CEST)
- INSEE/Postal code: 67441 /67350
- ^{1} French Land Register data, which excludes lakes, ponds, glaciers > 1 km^{2} (0.386 sq mi or 247 acres) and river estuaries.

Schalkendorf (French pronunciation: [ʃalkəndɔʁf]) is a commune in the Bas-Rhin department and Grand Est region of north-eastern France.

== See also ==
- Communes of the Bas-Rhin department
