= Uttwiller =

- Commune
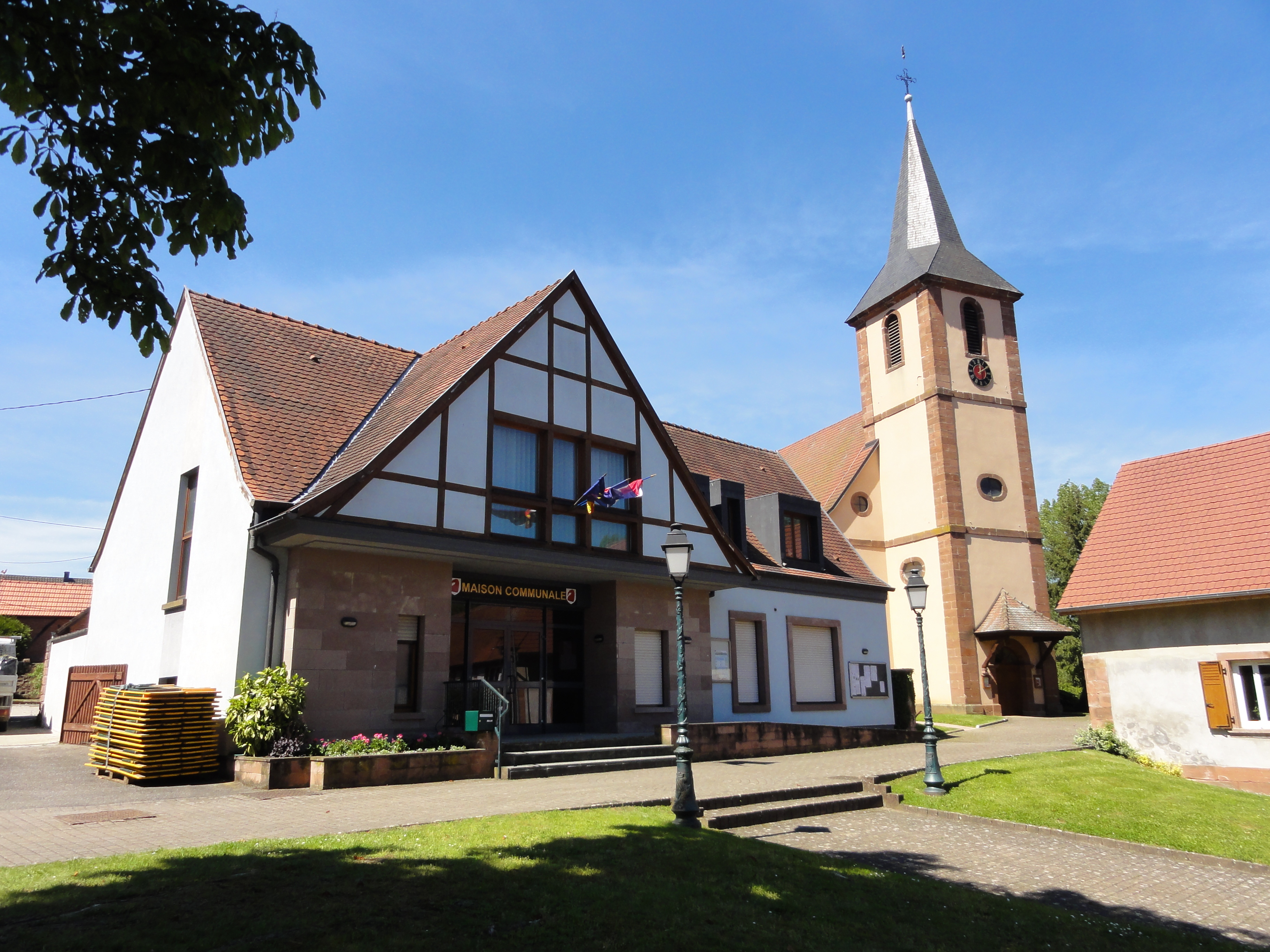
- The town hall in Uttwiller

- Coat of arms
- Location of Uttwiller
- Location within France Location within Grand Est
- Coordinates: 48°50′52″N 7°29′22″E
- Country: France
- Region: Grand Est
- Department: Bas-Rhin
- Arrondissement: Saverne
- Canton: Bouxwiller

Government
  - Mayor (2020–2026): Roland Koenig
- Area^{1}: 2.99 km^{2} (1.15 sq mi)
- Highest elevation: 256 m (840 ft)
- Lowest elevation: 184 m (604 ft)
- Population (2023): 154
  - Density: 51.5/km^{2} (133/sq mi)
- Time zone: UTC+01:00 (CET)
  - Summer (DST): UTC+02:00 (CEST)
- INSEE/Postal code: 67503 /67330
- ^{1} French Land Register data, which excludes lakes, ponds, glaciers > 1 km^{2} (0.386 sq mi or 247 acres) and river estuaries.

Uttwiller (German: Uttweiler) is a commune in the Bas-Rhin department in Grand Est in north-eastern France.

== See also ==
- Communes of the Bas-Rhin department
