= Eschwiller =

- Commune
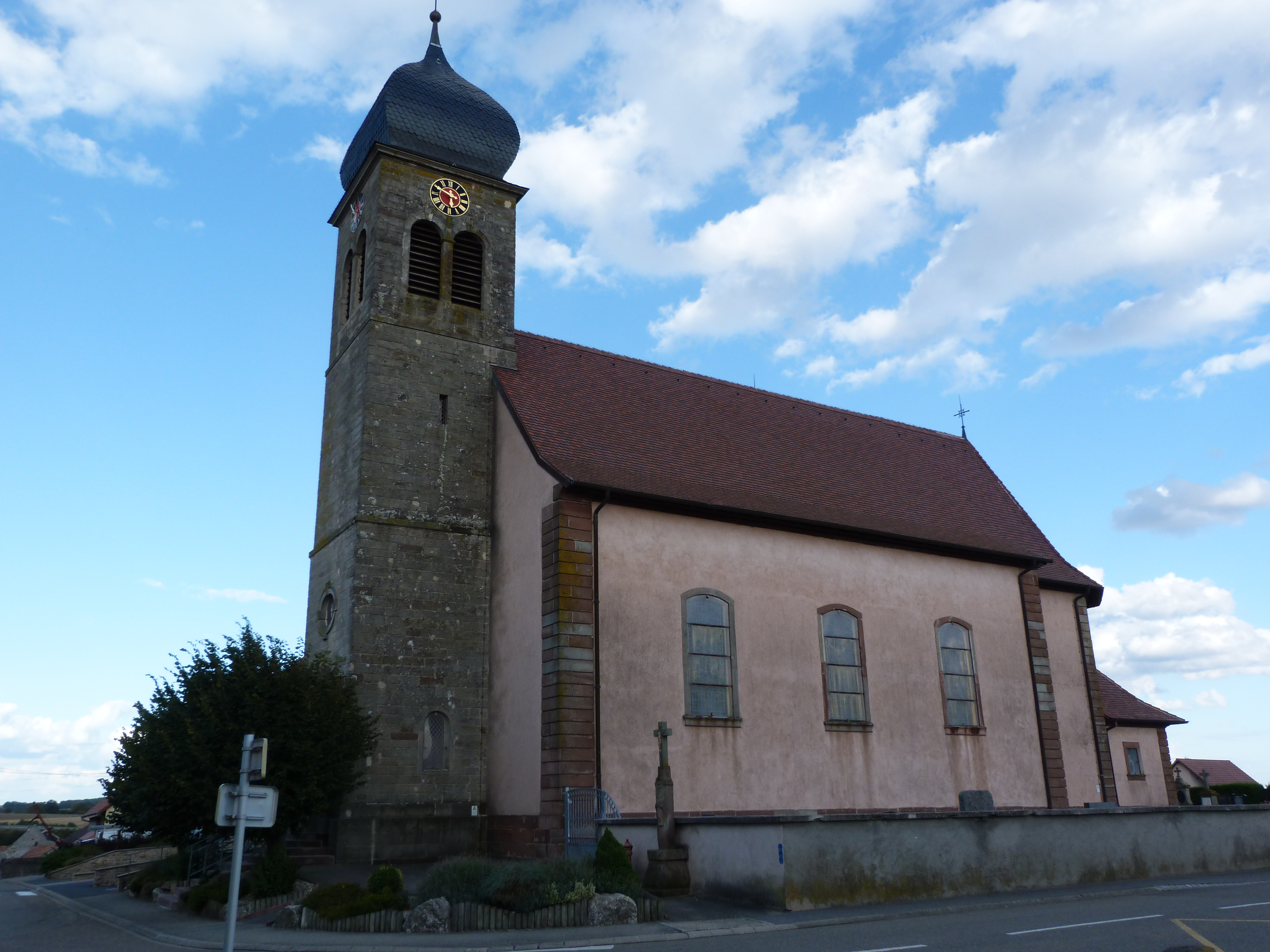
- The church in Eschwiller

- Coat of arms
- Location of Eschwiller
- Location within France Location within Grand Est
- Coordinates: 48°51′37″N 7°06′57″E
- Country: France
- Region: Grand Est
- Department: Bas-Rhin
- Arrondissement: Saverne
- Canton: Ingwiller

Government
  - Mayor (2020–2026): Jean-Paul Traxel
- Area^{1}: 3.49 km^{2} (1.35 sq mi)
- Highest elevation: 345 m (1,132 ft)
- Lowest elevation: 252 m (827 ft)
- Population (2023): 173
  - Density: 49.6/km^{2} (128/sq mi)
- Time zone: UTC+01:00 (CET)
  - Summer (DST): UTC+02:00 (CEST)
- INSEE/Postal code: 67134 /67320
- ^{1} French Land Register data, which excludes lakes, ponds, glaciers > 1 km^{2} (0.386 sq mi or 247 acres) and river estuaries.

Eschwiller (French pronunciation: [ɛʃvilɛʁ]; German: Eschweiler) is a commune in the Bas-Rhin department in Grand Est in north-eastern France.

== See also ==
- Communes of the Bas-Rhin department
