= Olwisheim =

- Commune
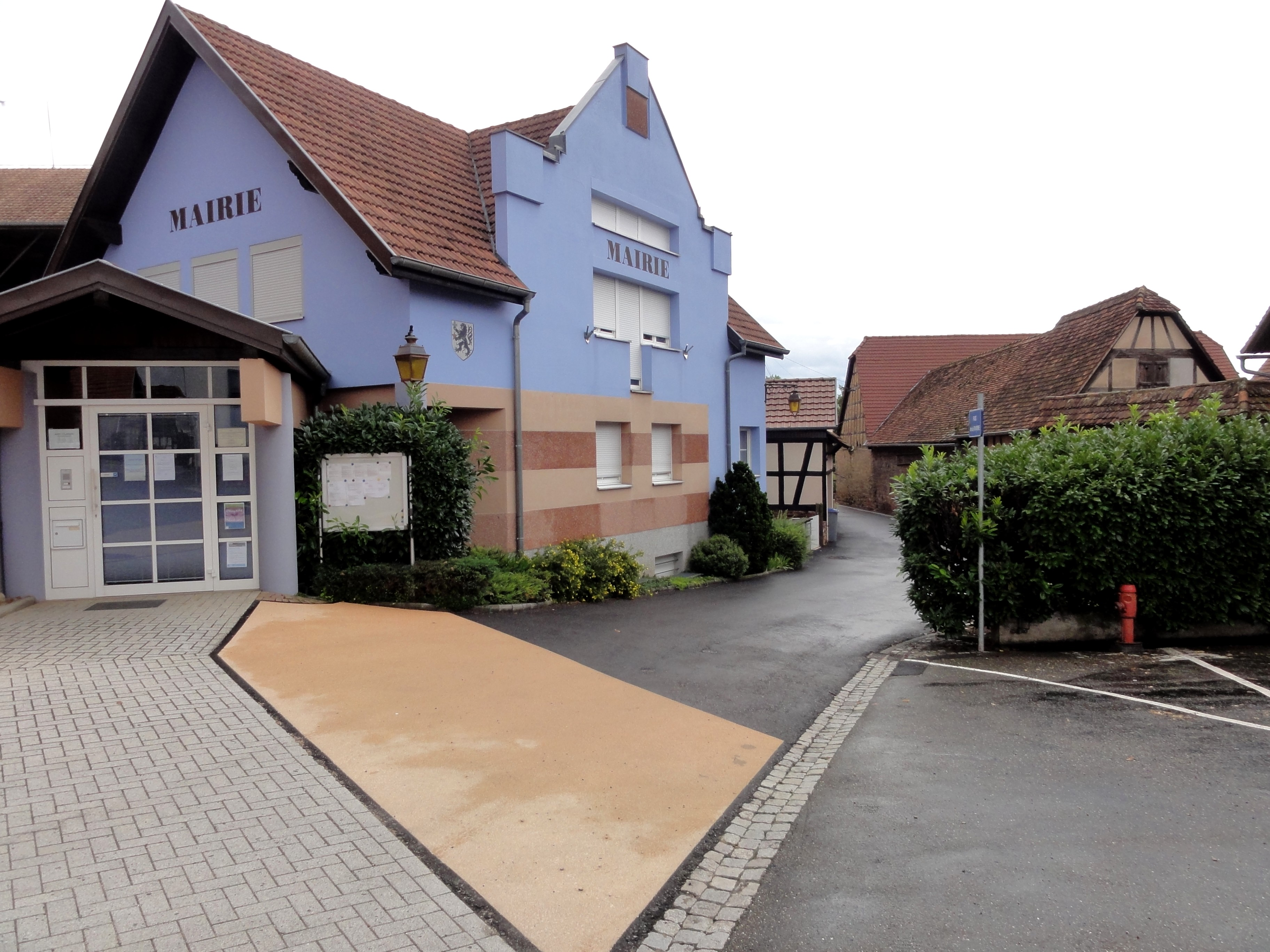
- The town hall in Olwisheim

- Coat of arms
- Location of Olwisheim
- Location within France Location within Grand Est
- Coordinates: 48°41′52″N 7°40′36″E
- Country: France
- Region: Grand Est
- Department: Bas-Rhin
- Arrondissement: Haguenau-Wissembourg
- Canton: Brumath
- Intercommunality: CA Haguenau

Government
  - Mayor (2020–2026): Alain Rhein
- Area^{1}: 2.96 km^{2} (1.14 sq mi)
- Highest elevation: 187 m (614 ft)
- Lowest elevation: 148 m (486 ft)
- Population (2023): 484
  - Density: 164/km^{2} (423/sq mi)
- Time zone: UTC+01:00 (CET)
  - Summer (DST): UTC+02:00 (CEST)
- INSEE/Postal code: 67361 /67170
- ^{1} French Land Register data, which excludes lakes, ponds, glaciers > 1 km^{2} (0.386 sq mi or 247 acres) and river estuaries.

Olwisheim (French pronunciation: [ɔlvisaim]; Alsatian: Olse) is a commune in the Bas-Rhin department in Grand Est in north-eastern France.

== See also ==
- Communes of the Bas-Rhin department
