= Canton of Bouxwiller =

Coordinates: 48.82°N 7.48°E

- Canton
- Situation of the canton of Bouxwiller in the department of Bas-Rhin
- Country: France
- Region: Grand Est
- Department: Bas-Rhin
- No. of communes: {{{nbcomm}}}
- Population (2023): 51,047
- INSEE code: 6702

The canton of Bouxwiller is an administrative division of the Bas-Rhin department, northeastern France. Its borders were modified at the French canton reorganisation which came into effect in March 2015. Its seat is in Bouxwiller.

It consists of the following communes:

1. Alteckendorf
2. Berstett
3. Bosselshausen
4. Bossendorf
5. Bouxwiller
6. Buswiller
7. Dingsheim
8. Dossenheim-Kochersberg
9. Duntzenheim
10. Durningen
11. Ettendorf
12. Fessenheim-le-Bas
13. Furdenheim
14. Geiswiller-Zœbersdorf
15. Gougenheim
16. Grassendorf
17. Griesheim-sur-Souffel
18. Handschuheim
19. Hochfelden
20. Hohfrankenheim
21. Hurtigheim
22. Ingenheim
23. Issenhausen
24. Ittenheim
25. Kienheim
26. Kirrwiller
27. Kuttolsheim
28. Lixhausen
29. Melsheim
30. Minversheim
31. Mutzenhouse
32. Neugartheim-Ittlenheim
33. Obermodern-Zutzendorf
34. Obersoultzbach
35. Pfulgriesheim
36. Quatzenheim
37. Ringendorf
38. Rohr
39. Schalkendorf
40. Scherlenheim
41. Schnersheim
42. Schwindratzheim
43. Stutzheim-Offenheim
44. Truchtersheim
45. Uttwiller
46. Val-de-Moder (partly)
47. Waltenheim-sur-Zorn
48. Wickersheim-Wilshausen
49. Willgottheim
50. Wilwisheim
51. Wingersheim-les-Quatre-Bans
52. Wintzenheim-Kochersberg
53. Wiwersheim
