= Wickersheim-Wilshausen =

- Commune
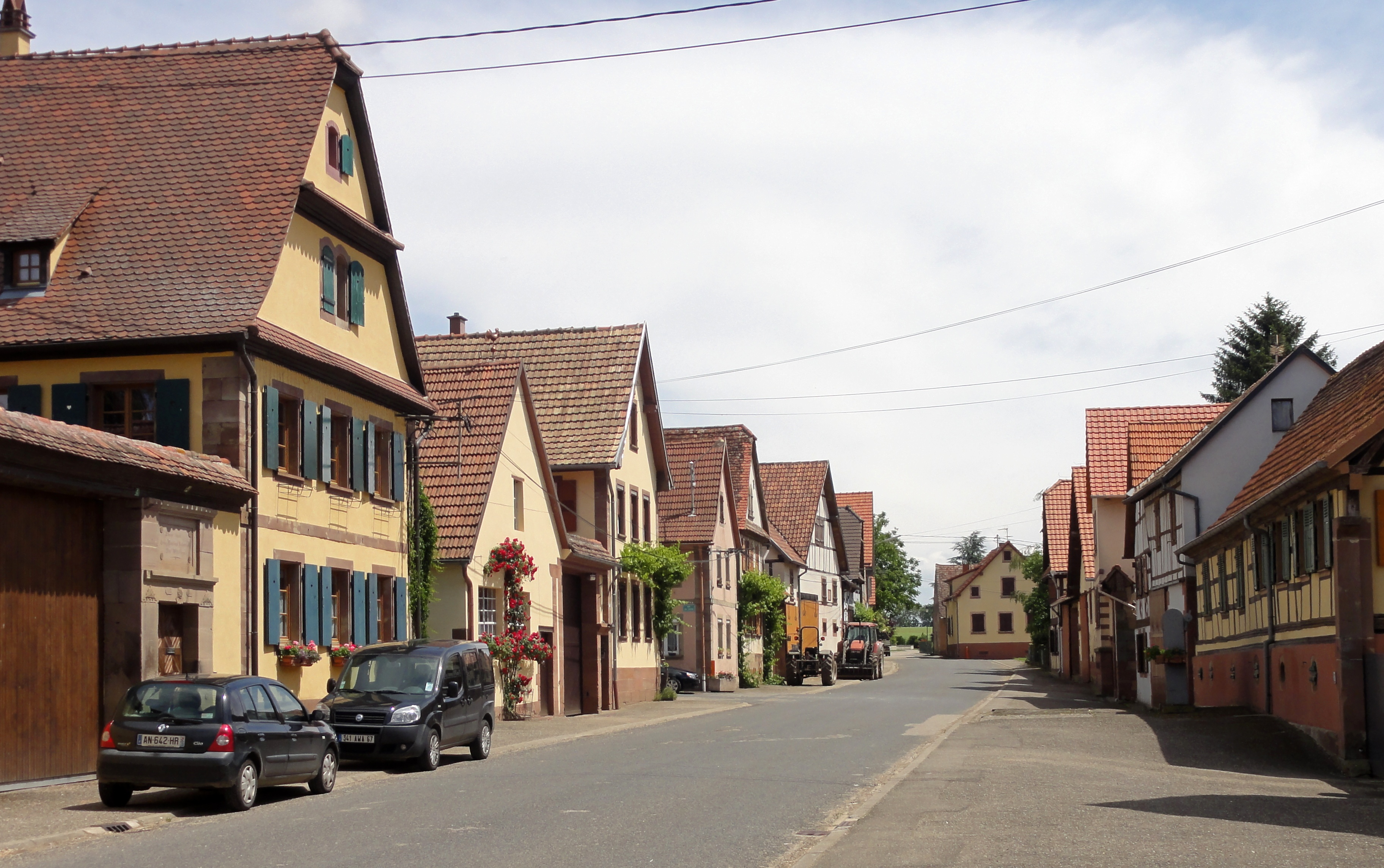
- The main road in Wickersheim

- Coat of arms
- Location of Wickersheim-Wilshausen
- Location within France Location within Grand Est
- Coordinates: 48°47′02″N 7°31′57″E
- Country: France
- Region: Grand Est
- Department: Bas-Rhin
- Arrondissement: Saverne
- Canton: Bouxwiller
- Intercommunality: Pays de la Zorn

Government
  - Mayor (2020–2026): René Hatt
- Area^{1}: 5.45 km^{2} (2.10 sq mi)
- Elevation: 185 m (607 ft)
- Highest elevation: 228 m (748 ft)
- Lowest elevation: 168 m (551 ft)
- Population (2023): 391
  - Density: 71.7/km^{2} (186/sq mi)
- Time zone: UTC+01:00 (CET)
  - Summer (DST): UTC+02:00 (CEST)
- INSEE/Postal code: 67530 /67270
- ^{1} French Land Register data, which excludes lakes, ponds, glaciers > 1 km^{2} (0.386 sq mi or 247 acres) and river estuaries.

Wickersheim-Wilshausen is a commune in the Bas-Rhin department in Grand Est in north-eastern France. The commune was formed in 1973 by the merger of the former communes Wickersheim and Wilshausen.

== Population ==
Population data refer to the area corresponding with the commune as of January 2025.

Historical population
Year	Pop.	±% p.a.
1968	389	—
1975	378	−0.41%
1982	394	+0.59%
1990	429	+1.07%
1999	433	+0.10%
2007	435	+0.06%
2012	454	+0.86%
2017	392	−2.89%
2023	391	−0.04%
Source: INSEE

== See also ==
- Communes of the Bas-Rhin department
