= Melsheim =

Melsheim Malse
- Commune
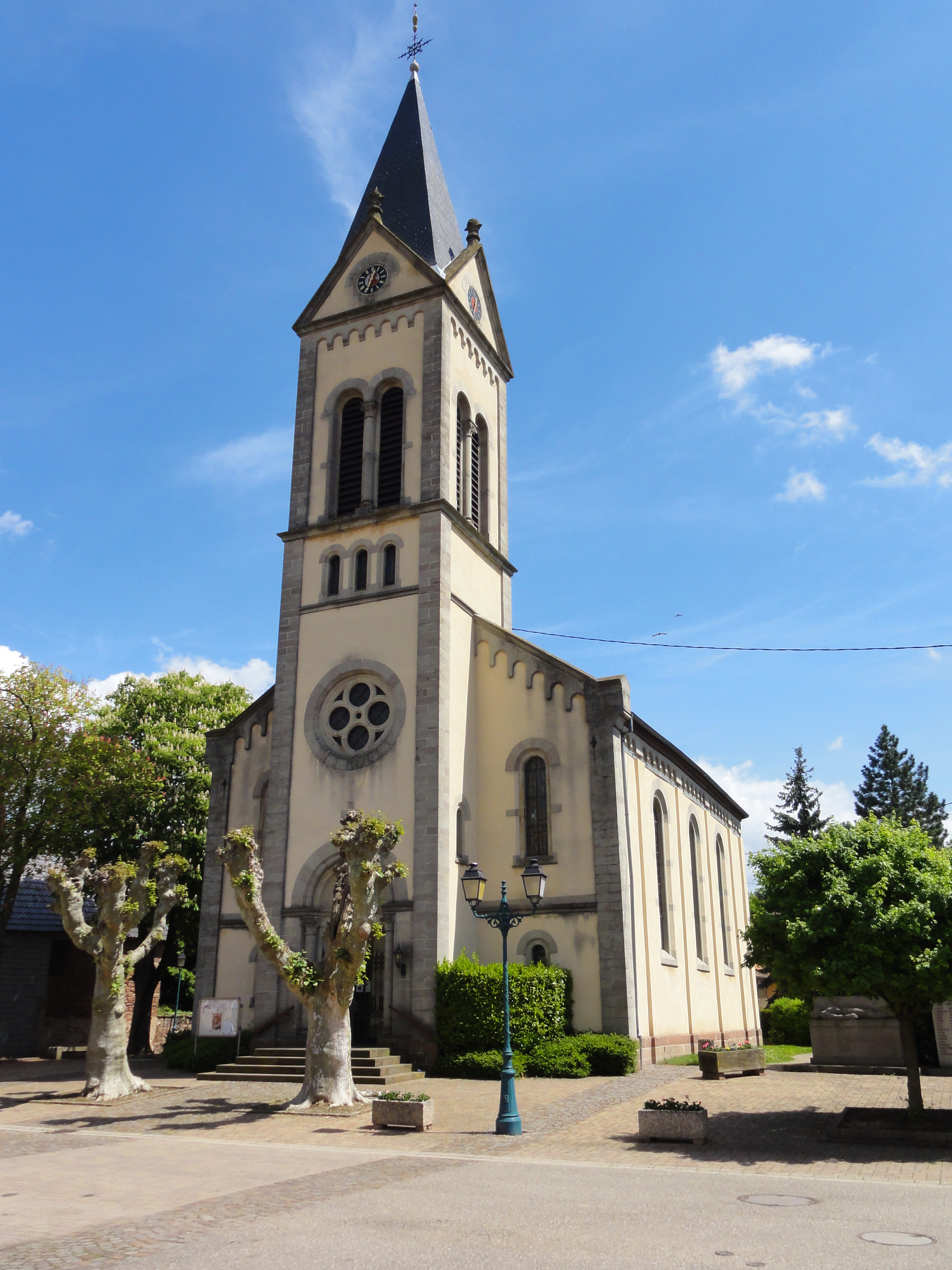
- The Protestant church in Melsheim

- Coat of arms
- Location of Melsheim
- Location within France Location within Grand Est
- Coordinates: 48°45′29″N 7°31′21″E
- Country: France
- Region: Grand Est
- Department: Bas-Rhin
- Arrondissement: Saverne
- Canton: Bouxwiller

Government
  - Mayor (2023–2026): Raphaël Mehl
- Area^{1}: 5.21 km^{2} (2.01 sq mi)
- Highest elevation: 236 m (774 ft)
- Lowest elevation: 158 m (518 ft)
- Population (2023): 554
  - Density: 106/km^{2} (275/sq mi)
- Time zone: UTC+01:00 (CET)
  - Summer (DST): UTC+02:00 (CEST)
- INSEE/Postal code: 67287 /67270
- ^{1} French Land Register data, which excludes lakes, ponds, glaciers > 1 km^{2} (0.386 sq mi or 247 acres) and river estuaries.

Melsheim (French pronunciation: [mɛlsaim]; Alsatian: Malse) is a commune in the Bas-Rhin department in Grand Est in north-eastern France.

== See also ==
- Communes of the Bas-Rhin department
