= Ringendorf =

Ringendorf Ríngedorf
- Commune
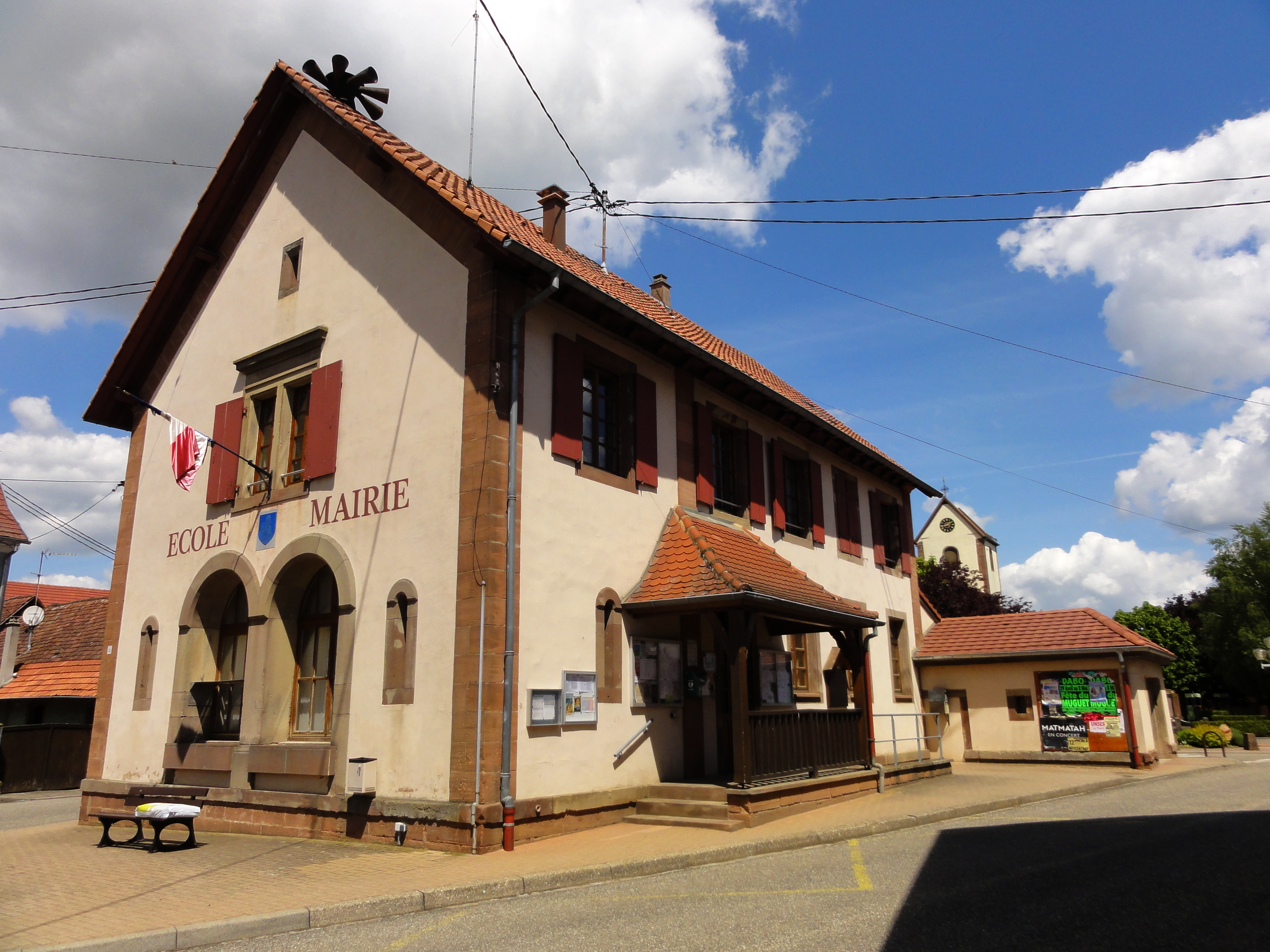
- The town hall in Ringendorf

- Coat of arms
- Location of Ringendorf
- Location within France Location within Grand Est
- Coordinates: 48°48′29″N 7°33′22″E
- Country: France
- Region: Grand Est
- Department: Bas-Rhin
- Arrondissement: Saverne
- Canton: Bouxwiller

Government
  - Mayor (2020–2026): Pascal Herrmann
- Area^{1}: 3.66 km^{2} (1.41 sq mi)
- Highest elevation: 276 m (906 ft)
- Lowest elevation: 190 m (620 ft)
- Population (2023): 457
  - Density: 125/km^{2} (323/sq mi)
- Time zone: UTC+01:00 (CET)
  - Summer (DST): UTC+02:00 (CEST)
- INSEE/Postal code: 67403 /67350
- ^{1} French Land Register data, which excludes lakes, ponds, glaciers > 1 km^{2} (0.386 sq mi or 247 acres) and river estuaries.

Ringendorf (French pronunciation: [ʁiŋ(ɡ)əndɔʁf]; Alsatian: Ríngedorf) is a commune in the Bas-Rhin department in Grand Est in north-eastern France.

== Notable people ==
- André Maurois, French academic

== See also ==
- Communes of the Bas-Rhin department
