= Lixhausen =

Lixhausen Líxhüse
- Commune
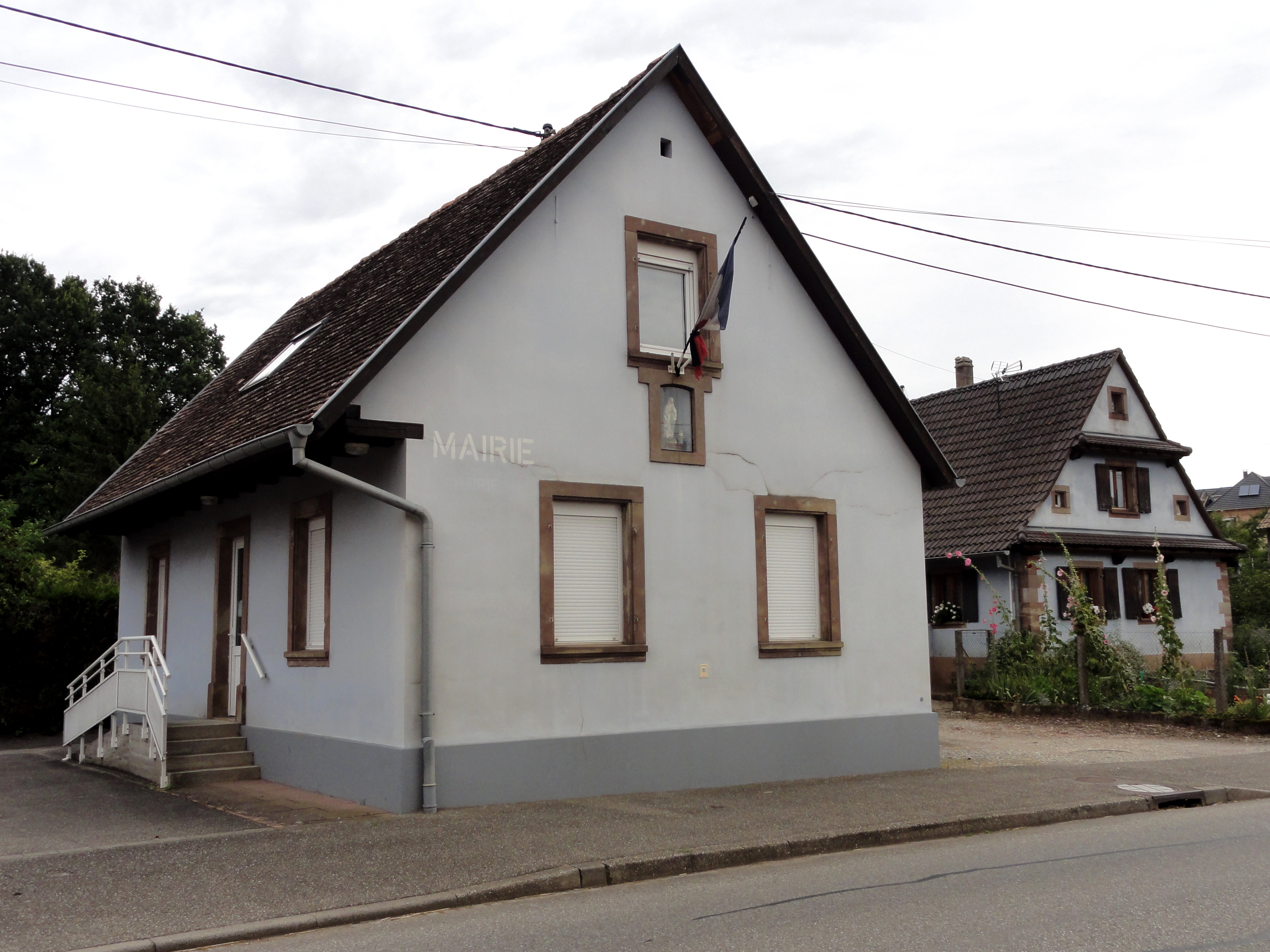
- The town hall in Lixhausen

- Coat of arms
- Location of Lixhausen
- Location within France Location within Grand Est
- Coordinates: 48°47′42″N 7°33′00″E
- Country: France
- Region: Grand Est
- Department: Bas-Rhin
- Arrondissement: Saverne
- Canton: Bouxwiller

Government
  - Mayor (2020–2026): Daniel Lengenfelder
- Area^{1}: 3.29 km^{2} (1.27 sq mi)
- Highest elevation: 248 m (814 ft)
- Lowest elevation: 167 m (548 ft)
- Population (2023): 364
  - Density: 111/km^{2} (287/sq mi)
- Time zone: UTC+01:00 (CET)
  - Summer (DST): UTC+02:00 (CEST)
- INSEE/Postal code: 67270 /67270
- ^{1} French Land Register data, which excludes lakes, ponds, glaciers > 1 km^{2} (0.386 sq mi or 247 acres) and river estuaries.

Lixhausen (French pronunciation: [liksauzən]; Alsatian: Líxhüse) is a commune in the Bas-Rhin department in Grand Est in north-eastern France.

== See also ==
- Communes of the Bas-Rhin department
