= Scherlenheim =

- Commune
- Coat of arms
- Location of Scherlenheim
- Location within France Location within Grand Est
- Coordinates: 48°45′55″N 7°32′08″E
- Country: France
- Region: Grand Est
- Department: Bas-Rhin
- Arrondissement: Saverne
- Canton: Bouxwiller

Government
  - Mayor (2020–2026): Marie-Paule Lehmann
- Area^{1}: 2.32 km^{2} (0.90 sq mi)
- Highest elevation: 229 m (751 ft)
- Lowest elevation: 173 m (568 ft)
- Population (2023): 112
  - Density: 48.3/km^{2} (125/sq mi)
- Time zone: UTC+01:00 (CET)
  - Summer (DST): UTC+02:00 (CEST)
- INSEE/Postal code: 67444 /67270
- ^{1} French Land Register data, which excludes lakes, ponds, glaciers > 1 km^{2} (0.386 sq mi or 247 acres) and river estuaries.

Scherlenheim (French pronunciation: [ʃɛʁlənaim]) is a commune in the Bas-Rhin department in Grand Est in north-eastern France.

== See also ==
- Communes of the Bas-Rhin department
