= Hohfrankenheim =

Hohfrankenheim Huhfrànkne
- Commune
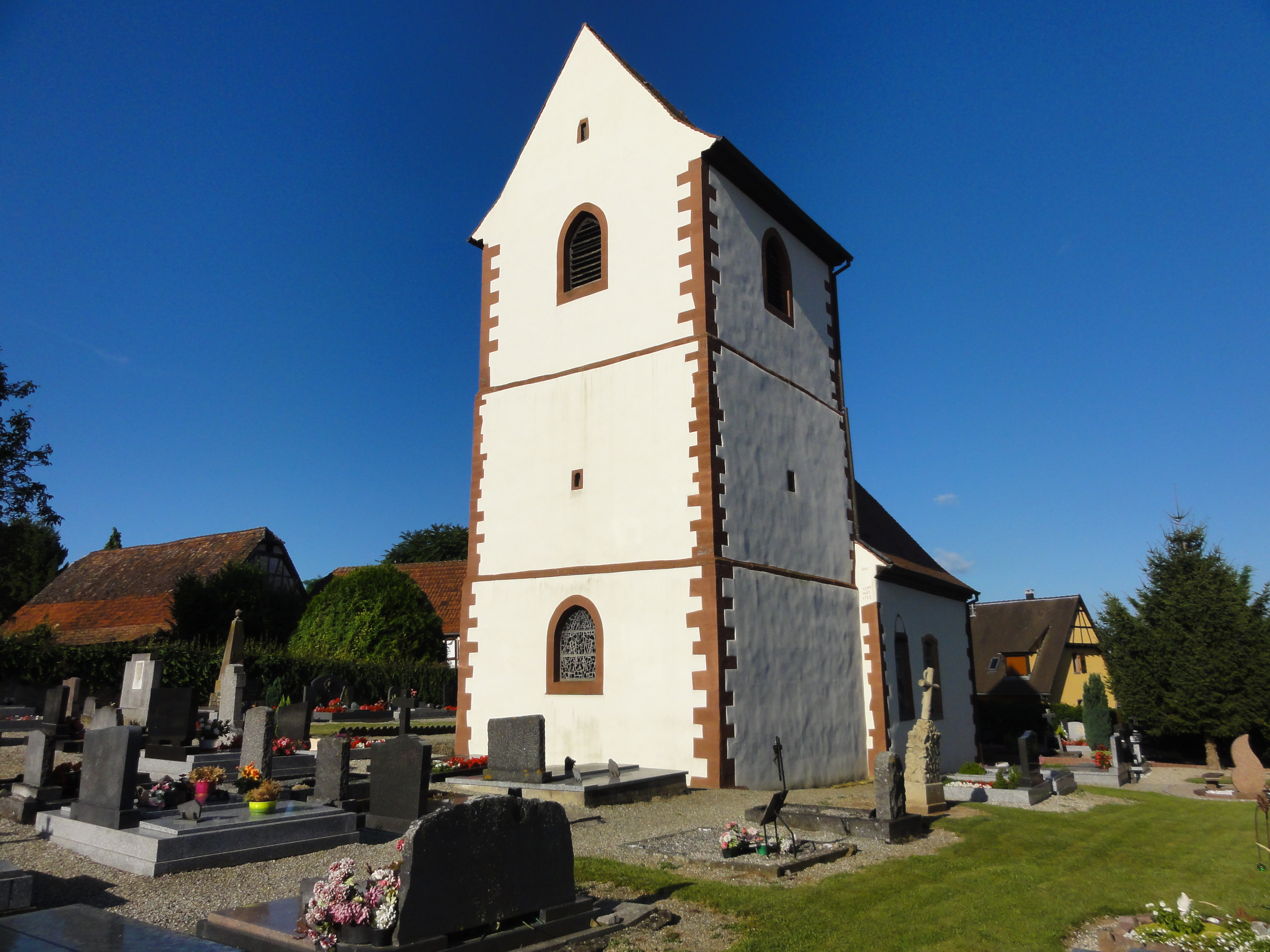
- The Protestant church in Hohfrankenheim

- Coat of arms
- Location of Hohfrankenheim
- Location within France Location within Grand Est
- Coordinates: 48°43′51″N 7°34′38″E
- Country: France
- Region: Grand Est
- Department: Bas-Rhin
- Arrondissement: Saverne
- Canton: Bouxwiller

Government
  - Mayor (2020–2026): Patrick Lentz
- Area^{1}: 2.76 km^{2} (1.07 sq mi)
- Highest elevation: 260 m (850 ft)
- Lowest elevation: 168 m (551 ft)
- Population (2023): 273
  - Density: 98.9/km^{2} (256/sq mi)
- Time zone: UTC+01:00 (CET)
  - Summer (DST): UTC+02:00 (CEST)
- INSEE/Postal code: 67209 /67270
- ^{1} French Land Register data, which excludes lakes, ponds, glaciers > 1 km^{2} (0.386 sq mi or 247 acres) and river estuaries.

Hohfrankenheim (French pronunciation: [oːfraŋkənajm]) is a commune in the Bas-Rhin department in Grand Est in north-eastern France.

== History ==
The first surviving record of Hohfrankenheim dates from 830.

== See also ==
- Communes of the Bas-Rhin department
