= Mutzenhouse =

Mutzenhouse Mutzehüse
- Commune
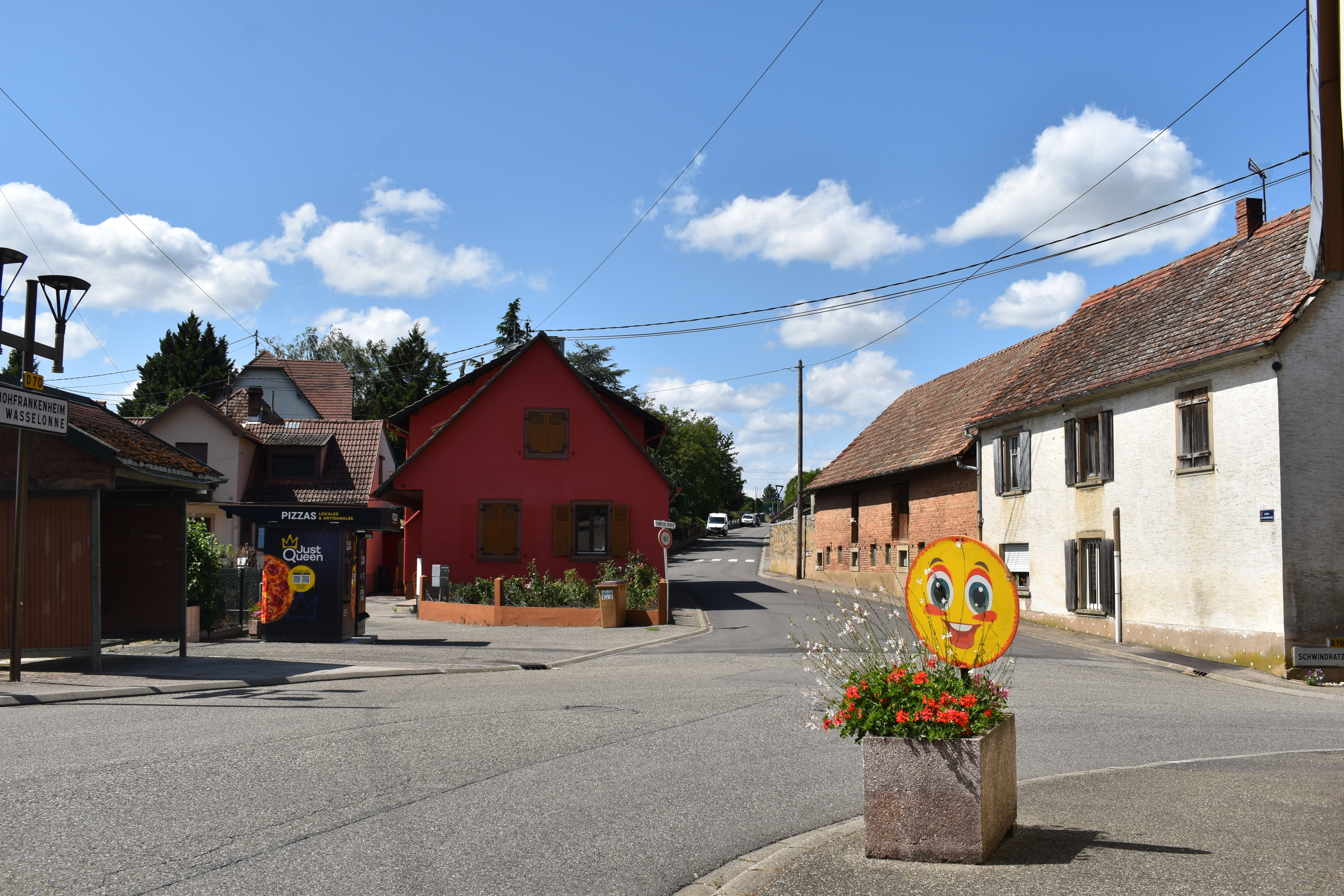
- Mutzenhouse's main intersection in 2023

- Coat of arms
- Location of Mutzenhouse
- Location within France Location within Grand Est
- Coordinates: 48°44′30″N 7°35′22″E
- Country: France
- Region: Grand Est
- Department: Bas-Rhin
- Arrondissement: Saverne
- Canton: Bouxwiller
- Intercommunality: Communauté de communes du Pays de la Zorn

Government
  - Mayor (2020–2026): Pascal Wicker
- Area^{1}: 2.21 km^{2} (0.85 sq mi)
- Highest elevation: 251 m (823 ft)
- Lowest elevation: 155 m (509 ft)
- Population (2023): 450
  - Density: 200/km^{2} (530/sq mi)
- Time zone: UTC+01:00 (CET)
  - Summer (DST): UTC+02:00 (CEST)
- INSEE/Postal code: 67312 /67270
- ^{1} French Land Register data, which excludes lakes, ponds, glaciers > 1 km^{2} (0.386 sq mi or 247 acres) and river estuaries.

Mutzenhouse (German: Mutzenhausen) is a commune in the Bas-Rhin department in Grand Est in north-eastern France.

== See also ==
- Communes of the Bas-Rhin department
