= Bossendorf =

Bossendorf Bossedorf
- Commune
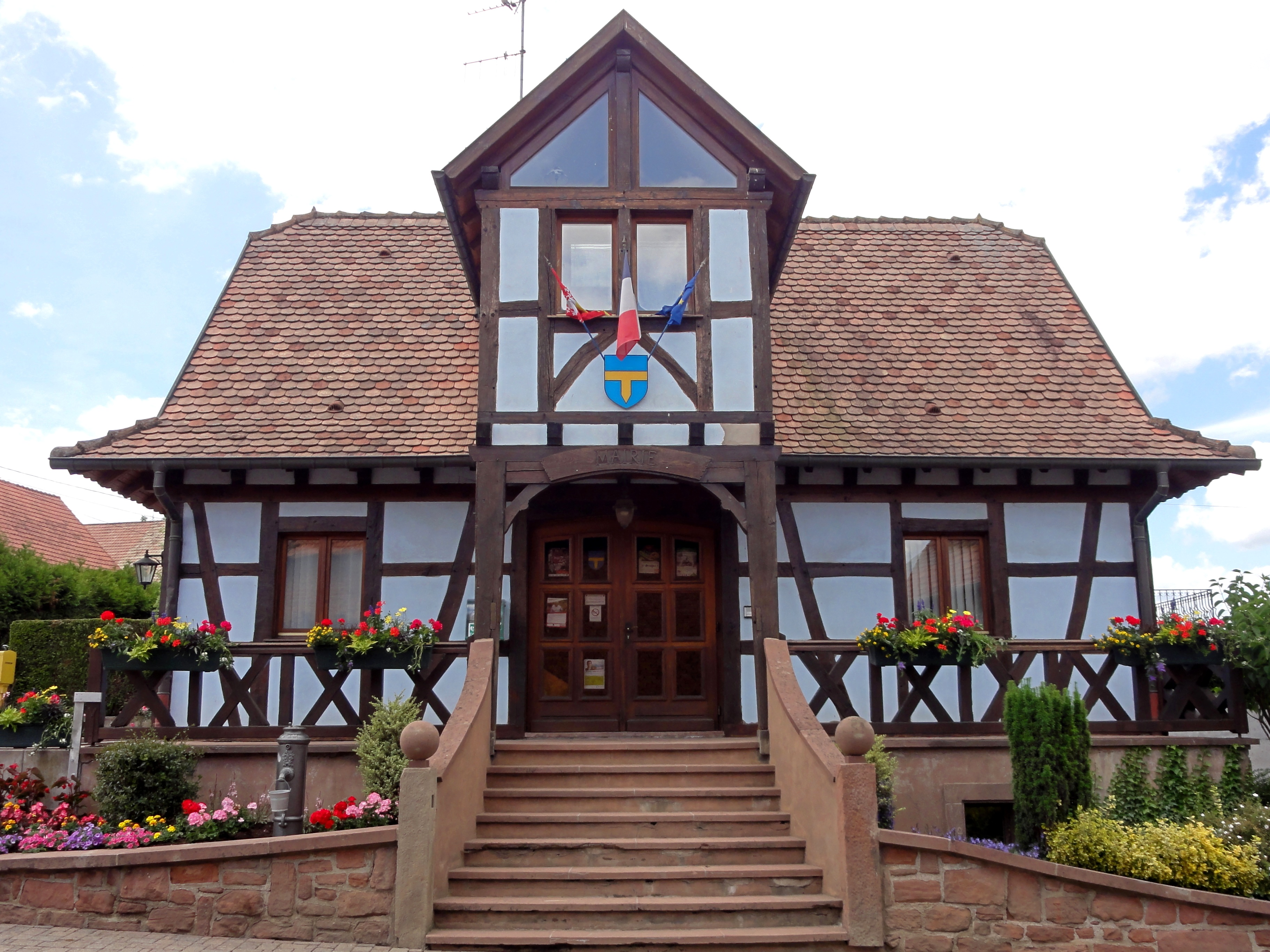
- The town hall in Bossendorf

- Coat of arms
- Location of Bossendorf
- Location within France Location within Grand Est
- Coordinates: 48°46′54″N 7°33′35″E
- Country: France
- Region: Grand Est
- Department: Bas-Rhin
- Arrondissement: Saverne
- Canton: Bouxwiller

Government
  - Mayor (2020–2026): Eric Schaeffer
- Area^{1}: 3.98 km^{2} (1.54 sq mi)
- Highest elevation: 230 m (750 ft)
- Lowest elevation: 158 m (518 ft)
- Population (2023): 379
  - Density: 95.2/km^{2} (247/sq mi)
- Time zone: UTC+01:00 (CET)
  - Summer (DST): UTC+02:00 (CEST)
- INSEE/Postal code: 67058 /67270
- ^{1} French Land Register data, which excludes lakes, ponds, glaciers > 1 km^{2} (0.386 sq mi or 247 acres) and river estuaries.

Bossendorf (French pronunciation: [bɔsəndɔrf]; Alsatian: Bossedorf) is a commune in the Bas-Rhin department in Grand Est in north-eastern France.

== See also ==
- Communes of the Bas-Rhin department
