= Issenhausen =

Issenhausen Issehüse
- Commune
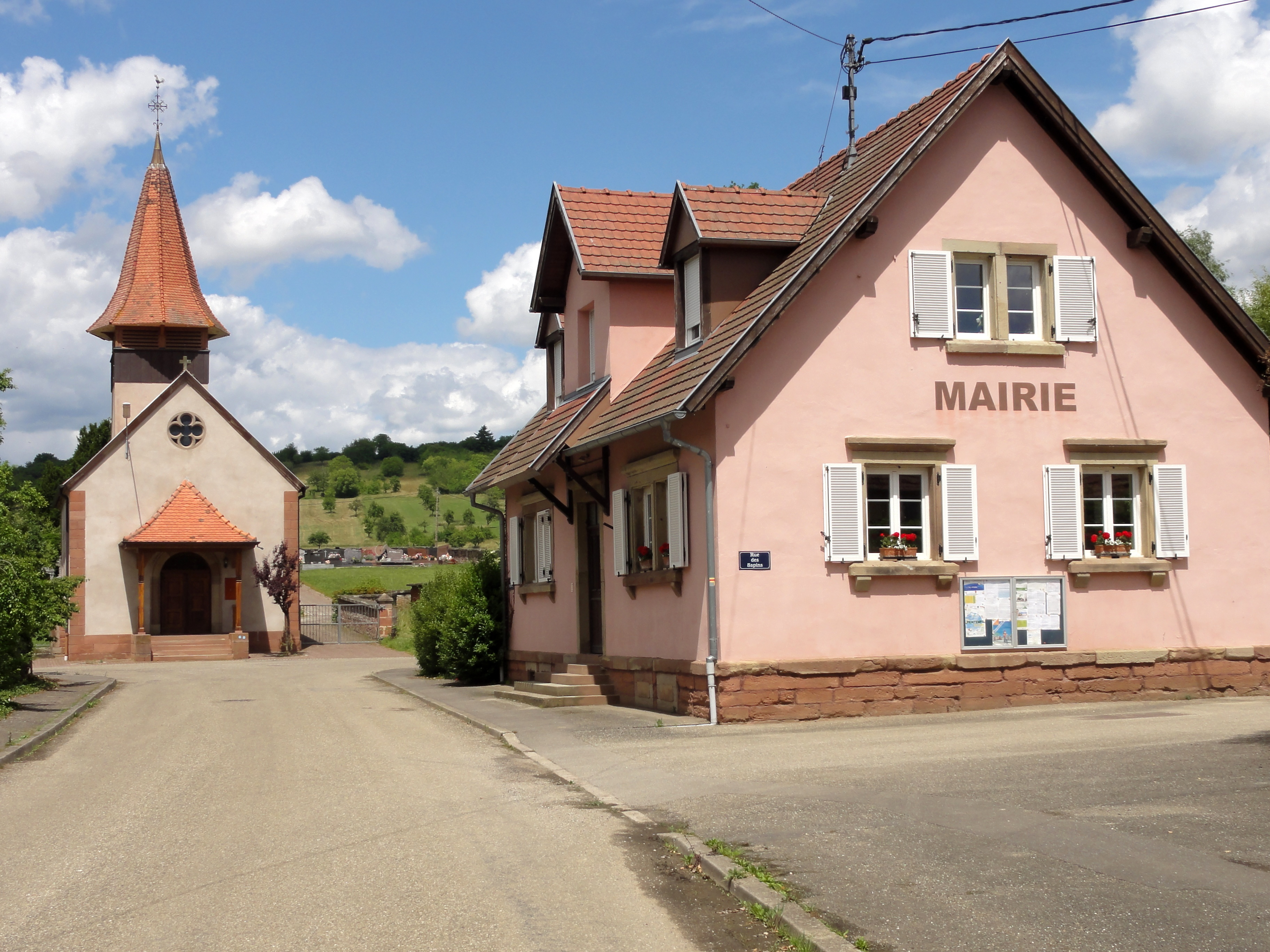
- The Protestant church and town hall in Issenhausen

- Coat of arms
- Location of Issenhausen
- Location within France Location within Grand Est
- Coordinates: 48°48′20″N 7°32′16″E
- Country: France
- Region: Grand Est
- Department: Bas-Rhin
- Arrondissement: Saverne
- Canton: Bouxwiller

Government
  - Mayor (2020–2026): Jérôme Guerreiro
- Area^{1}: 2.1 km^{2} (0.81 sq mi)
- Highest elevation: 254 m (833 ft)
- Lowest elevation: 177 m (581 ft)
- Population (2023): 106
  - Density: 50/km^{2} (130/sq mi)
- Time zone: UTC+01:00 (CET)
  - Summer (DST): UTC+02:00 (CEST)
- INSEE/Postal code: 67225 /67330
- ^{1} French Land Register data, which excludes lakes, ponds, glaciers > 1 km^{2} (0.386 sq mi or 247 acres) and river estuaries.

Issenhausen (French pronunciation: [isənauzən]; Alsatian: Issehüse) is a commune in the Bas-Rhin department in Grand Est in north-eastern France.

== Geography ==
Issenhausen is positioned 35 kilometres (22 mi) to the north-west of Strasbourg at the western edge of the Alsace plane, where the ground becomes less flat in apparent anticipation of the Vosges Mountains further to the west. This is essentially a one street village stretched out along the side of a hill, the shape of the overall commune being reminiscent of a shallow bowl. The landscape is of gentle rolling hills: the highest point within the commune is the 254 meter high Moenchberg. The subsoil is of sedimentary soil similar to that found in many parts of south-western Germany across the Rhine.

The "Bachgraben" stream, a tributary of the river Zorn, flows through the village.

== Economy ==
94% of the communal territory is given over to agriculture: cereal crops predominate in the early years of the 21st century.

== History ==
According to an etymological dictionary the name of the village denotes "The house at the source of the stream" which would be consistent with there being several areas of the 'bowl' formed commune where the water table breaks through the surface of the land. An alternative etymology indicates that "Issen" is a reference to "Eisen" a local word for iron and a reference to iron ore extraction taking place here.

The settlement was originally part of the estate of the Abbey of Marmoutier, and subsequently came under the control successively of several of the major land owning families of the region, including the counts of Hanau-Lichtenberg.

In 1702, while France was still in the process of digesting Alsace which it had recently acquired through conquest, Guillin, the military engineer based at Neuf-Brisach, wrote that Hissenhus was a village situated in a dip without a church nor anything else worthy of note ("Hissenhus est un petit village situé dans un fond sans aucune église n'y autre chose remarquable").

== Landmarks ==
There are many excellent examples of the half-timbered Alsatian houses for which the region is famous. The village has also acquired a church since the visit of the military surveyor: the church dates from 1850 and was renovated in 1914.

== See also ==
- Communes of the Bas-Rhin department
