= Canton of Illkirch-Graffenstaden =

Coordinates: 48.53°N 7.71°E

- Canton
- Situation of the canton of Illkirch-Graffenstaden in the department of Bas-Rhin
- Country: France
- Region: Grand Est
- Department: Bas-Rhin
- No. of communes: {{{nbcomm}}}
- Population (2023): 52,188
- INSEE code: 6707

The canton of Illkirch-Graffenstaden is an administrative division of the Bas-Rhin department, northeastern France. Its borders were modified at the French canton reorganisation which came into effect in March 2015. Its seat is in Illkirch-Graffenstaden.

It consists of the following communes:

1. Eschau
2. Illkirch-Graffenstaden
3. Ostwald
4. Plobsheim
