= Grassendorf =

Grassendorf Gràssedorf
- Commune
- Coat of arms
- Location of Grassendorf
- Location within France Location within Grand Est
- Coordinates: 48°49′11″N 7°36′54″E
- Country: France
- Region: Grand Est
- Department: Bas-Rhin
- Arrondissement: Saverne
- Canton: Bouxwiller

Government
  - Mayor (2020–2026): Bernard Ingwiller
- Area^{1}: 2.24 km^{2} (0.86 sq mi)
- Highest elevation: 296 m (971 ft)
- Lowest elevation: 212 m (696 ft)
- Population (2023): 264
  - Density: 118/km^{2} (305/sq mi)
- Time zone: UTC+01:00 (CET)
  - Summer (DST): UTC+02:00 (CEST)
- INSEE/Postal code: 67166 /67350
- ^{1} French Land Register data, which excludes lakes, ponds, glaciers > 1 km^{2} (0.386 sq mi or 247 acres) and river estuaries.

Grassendorf (French pronunciation: [ɡʁasəndɔʁf]; Alsatian: Gràssedorf) is a commune in the Bas-Rhin department in Grand Est in north-eastern France.

== History ==
Following the Thirty Years War which badly depleted population levels in much of Alsace, a large number of immigrants arrived from the Thiérache region of Picardy during the middle of the seventeenth century.

In the local language the inhabitants of Grassendorf are known as "Welschguller" which means something along the lines of "foreign turkeys". Until the 1990s the spire of the parish church was topped off by the carving of a turkey rather than of the Gallic rooster which is more normally found on the tops of church spires in rural France.

== See also ==
- Communes of the Bas-Rhin department
