= Ettendorf =

Ettendorf Attedorf
- Commune
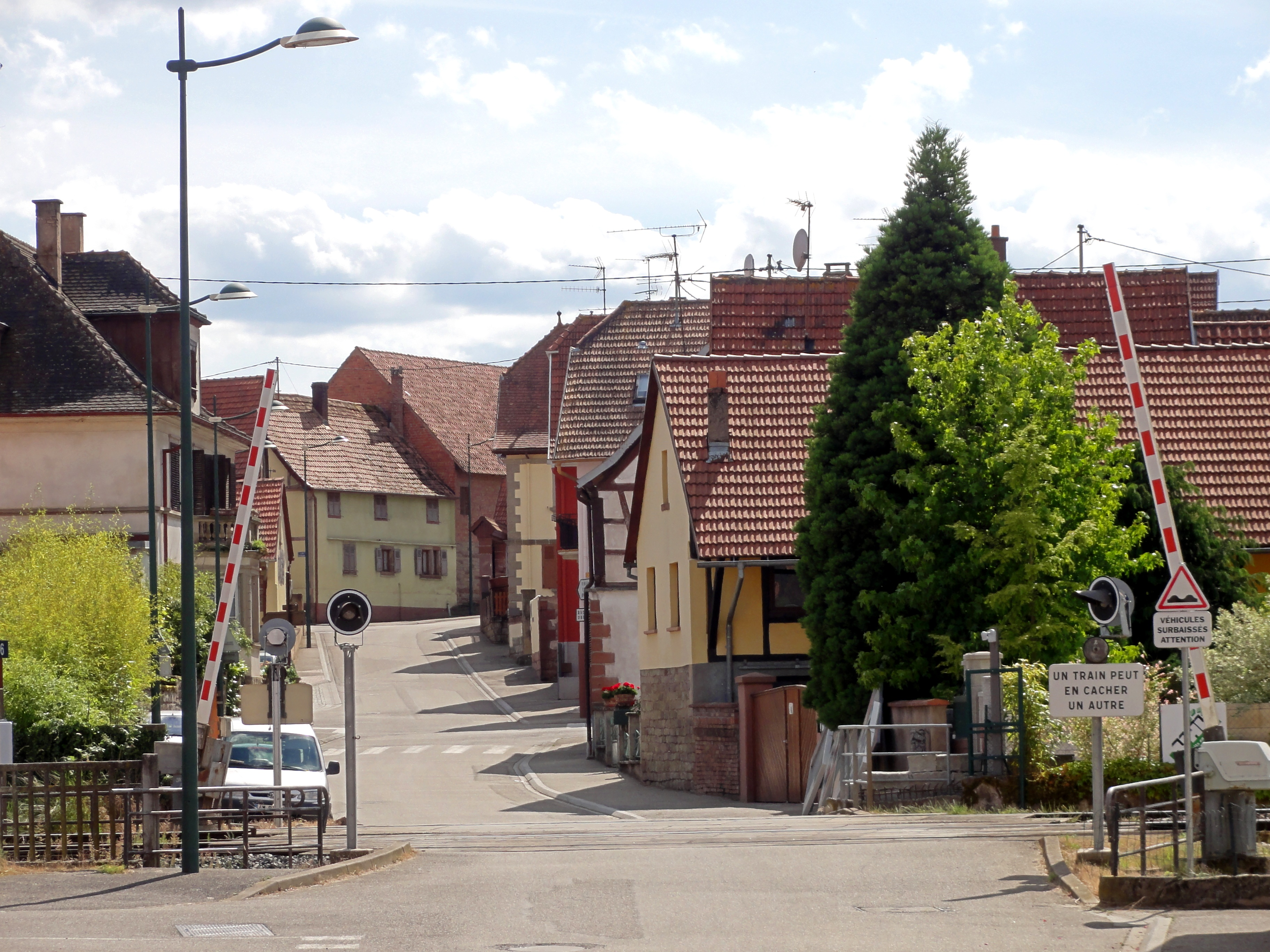
- A view within Ettendorf

- Coat of arms
- Location of Ettendorf
- Location within France Location within Grand Est
- Coordinates: 48°48′49″N 7°34′59″E
- Country: France
- Region: Grand Est
- Department: Bas-Rhin
- Arrondissement: Saverne
- Canton: Bouxwiller
- Intercommunality: Pays de la Zorn

Government
  - Mayor (2020–2026): Nicolas Rodriguez
- Area^{1}: 6.34 km^{2} (2.45 sq mi)
- Highest elevation: 286 m (938 ft)
- Lowest elevation: 181 m (594 ft)
- Population (2023): 734
  - Density: 116/km^{2} (300/sq mi)
- Time zone: UTC+01:00 (CET)
  - Summer (DST): UTC+02:00 (CEST)
- INSEE/Postal code: 67135 /67350
- ^{1} French Land Register data, which excludes lakes, ponds, glaciers > 1 km^{2} (0.386 sq mi or 247 acres) and river estuaries.

Ettendorf (French pronunciation: [ɛtəndɔrf]) is a commune in the Bas-Rhin department in Grand Est in north-eastern France.

== See also ==
- Communes of the Bas-Rhin department
