= Minversheim =

Minversheim Memfersche
- Commune
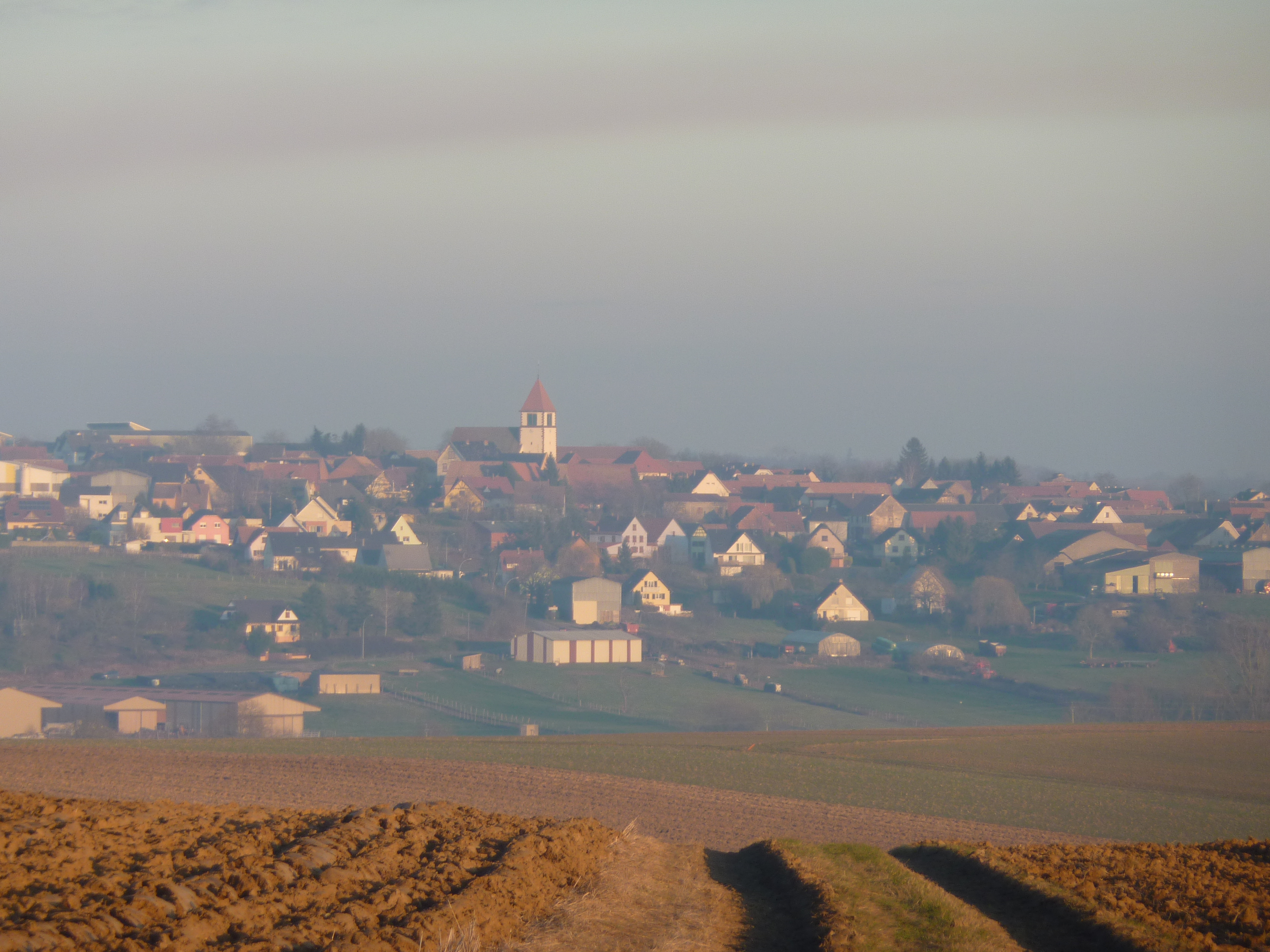
- A general view of Minversheim

- Coat of arms
- Location of Minversheim
- Location within France Location within Grand Est
- Coordinates: 48°47′09″N 7°37′23″E
- Country: France
- Region: Grand Est
- Department: Bas-Rhin
- Arrondissement: Saverne
- Canton: Bouxwiller
- Intercommunality: CC Pays de la Zorn

Government
  - Mayor (2020–2026): Bernard Lienhard
- Area^{1}: 5.45 km^{2} (2.10 sq mi)
- Highest elevation: 258 m (846 ft)
- Lowest elevation: 157 m (515 ft)
- Population (2023): 721
  - Density: 132/km^{2} (343/sq mi)
- Time zone: UTC+01:00 (CET)
  - Summer (DST): UTC+02:00 (CEST)
- INSEE/Postal code: 67293 /67270
- ^{1} French Land Register data, which excludes lakes, ponds, glaciers > 1 km^{2} (0.386 sq mi or 247 acres) and river estuaries.

Minversheim is a commune in the Bas-Rhin department and Grand Est region of north-eastern France.

== Population ==
Historical population
Year	Pop.	±% p.a.
1968	539	—
1975	541	+0.05%
1982	501	−1.09%
1990	485	−0.40%
1999	510	+0.56%
2007	620	+2.47%
2012	680	+1.86%
2017	661	−0.57%
2023	721	+1.46%
Source: INSEE

== See also ==
- Communes of the Bas-Rhin department
