= Duntzenheim =

Duntzenheim Dunzne
- Commune
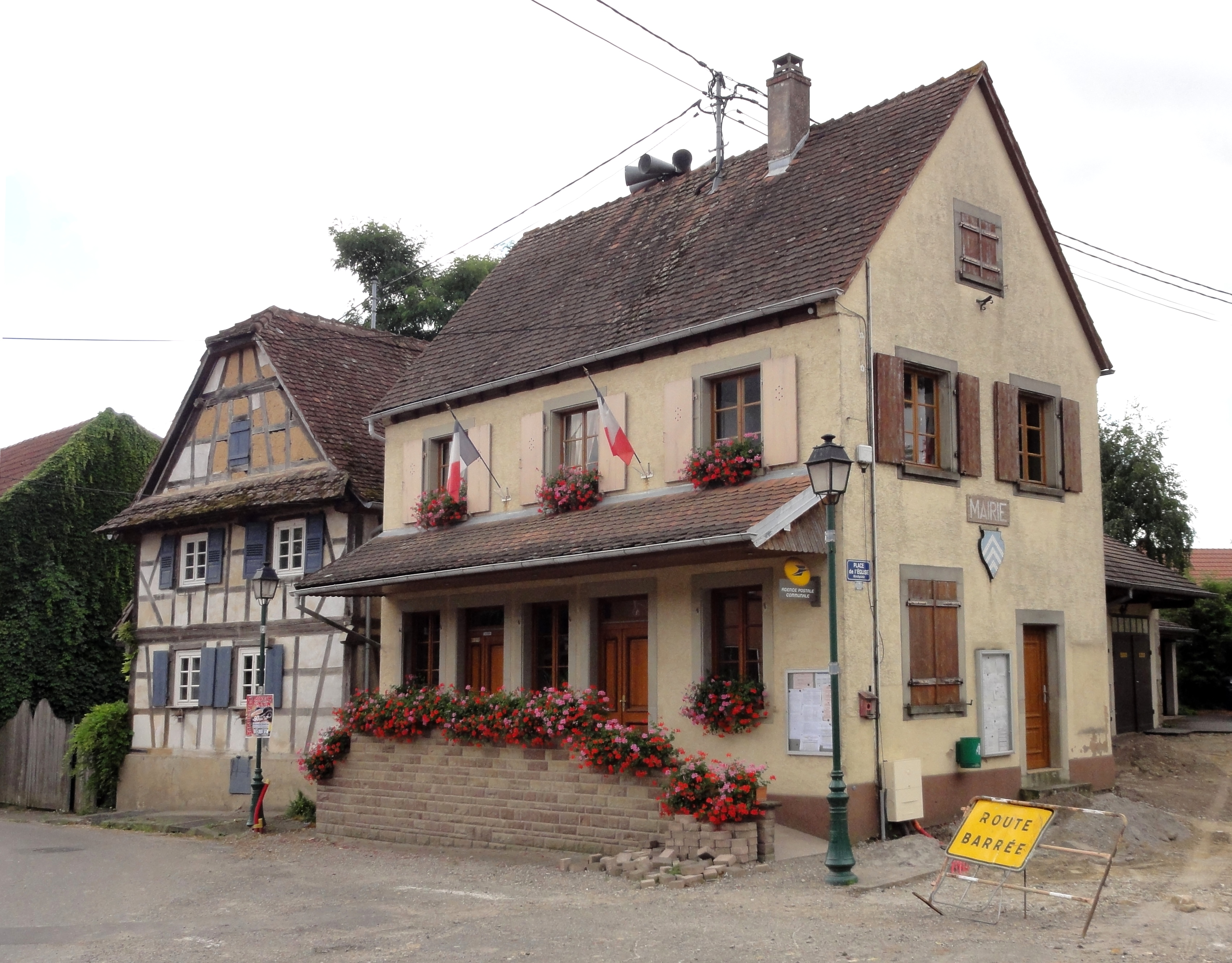
- The town hall in Duntzenheim

- Coat of arms
- Location of Duntzenheim
- Location within France Location within Grand Est
- Coordinates: 48°42′46″N 7°32′08″E
- Country: France
- Region: Grand Est
- Department: Bas-Rhin
- Arrondissement: Saverne
- Canton: Bouxwiller

Government
  - Mayor (2020–2026): Virginie Zimmermann
- Area^{1}: 6.21 km^{2} (2.40 sq mi)
- Highest elevation: 253 m (830 ft)
- Lowest elevation: 172 m (564 ft)
- Population (2023): 660
  - Density: 110/km^{2} (280/sq mi)
- Time zone: UTC+01:00 (CET)
  - Summer (DST): UTC+02:00 (CEST)
- INSEE/Postal code: 67107 /67270
- ^{1} French Land Register data, which excludes lakes, ponds, glaciers > 1 km^{2} (0.386 sq mi or 247 acres) and river estuaries.

Duntzenheim (French pronunciation: [duntsənaim]; German: Dunzenheim) is a commune in the Bas-Rhin department in Grand Est in north-eastern France.

== See also ==
- Communes of the Bas-Rhin department
