= Waltenheim-sur-Zorn =

- Commune
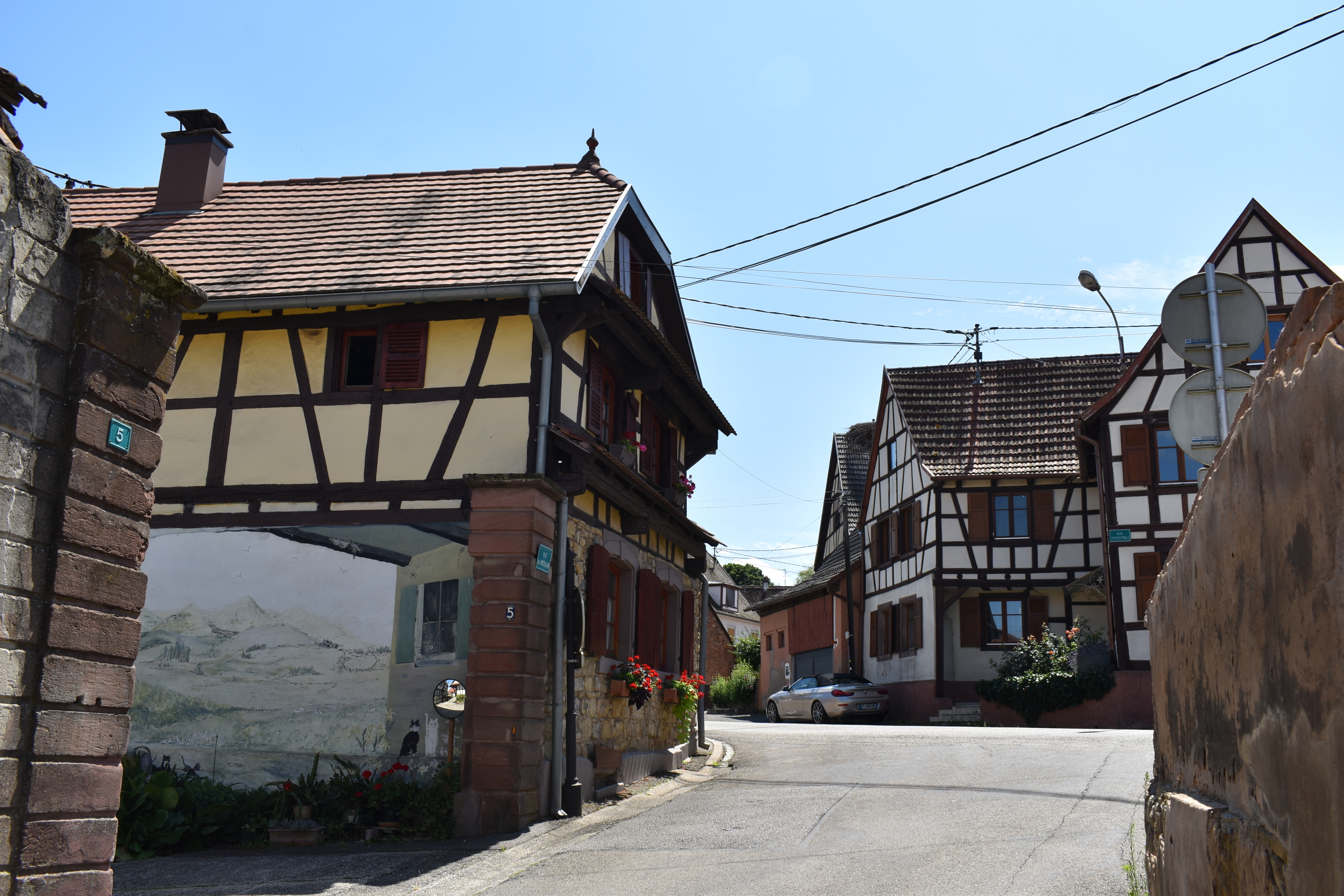
- Waltenheim-sur-Zorn's center, featuring several half-timbered houses and a courtyard, common features of alsatian architecture

- Coat of arms
- Location of Waltenheim-sur-Zorn
- Location within France Location within Grand Est
- Coordinates: 48°44′50″N 7°37′48″E
- Country: France
- Region: Grand Est
- Department: Bas-Rhin
- Arrondissement: Saverne
- Canton: Bouxwiller
- Intercommunality: Pays de la Zorn

Government
  - Mayor (2020–2026): Jeannot Krebs
- Area^{1}: 5.04 km^{2} (1.95 sq mi)
- Highest elevation: 258 m (846 ft)
- Lowest elevation: 147 m (482 ft)
- Population (2023): 655
  - Density: 130/km^{2} (337/sq mi)
- Time zone: UTC+01:00 (CET)
  - Summer (DST): UTC+02:00 (CEST)
- INSEE/Postal code: 67516 /67670
- ^{1} French Land Register data, which excludes lakes, ponds, glaciers > 1 km^{2} (0.386 sq mi or 247 acres) and river estuaries.

Waltenheim-sur-Zorn (German: Waltenheim an der Zorn) is a commune in the Bas-Rhin department in Grand Est in north-eastern France.

It lies on the road D332 next to the Marne-Rhine Canal.

== Population ==
Historical population
Year	Pop.	±% p.a.
1968	522	—
1975	518	−0.11%
1982	551	+0.89%
1990	601	+1.09%
1999	641	+0.72%
2007	720	+1.46%
2012	669	−1.46%
2017	664	−0.15%
2023	655	−0.23%
Source: INSEE

== See also ==
- Communes of the Bas-Rhin department
