= Canton of Schiltigheim =

Coordinates: 48.61°N 7.75°E

- Canton
- Situation of the canton of Schiltigheim in the department of Bas-Rhin
- Country: France
- Region: Grand Est
- Department: Bas-Rhin
- No. of communes: {{{nbcomm}}}
- Population (2023): 53,266
- INSEE code: 6715

The canton of Schiltigheim is an administrative division of the Bas-Rhin department, northeastern France. Its borders were modified at the French canton reorganisation which came into effect in March 2015. Its seat is in Schiltigheim.

It consists of the following communes:

1. Bischheim
2. Schiltigheim
