= Landersheim =

Landersheim Làndersche
- Commune
- Coat of arms
- Location of Landersheim
- Location within France Location within Grand Est
- Coordinates: 48°41′25″N 7°29′38″E
- Country: France
- Region: Grand Est
- Department: Bas-Rhin
- Arrondissement: Saverne
- Canton: Saverne
- Intercommunality: CC Pays de Saverne

Government
  - Mayor (2020–2026): Damien Frintz
- Area^{1}: 2.13 km^{2} (0.82 sq mi)
- Highest elevation: 241 m (791 ft)
- Lowest elevation: 181 m (594 ft)
- Population (2023): 192
  - Density: 90.1/km^{2} (233/sq mi)
- Time zone: UTC+01:00 (CET)
  - Summer (DST): UTC+02:00 (CEST)
- INSEE/Postal code: 67258 /67700
- ^{1} French Land Register data, which excludes lakes, ponds, glaciers > 1 km^{2} (0.386 sq mi or 247 acres) and river estuaries.

Landersheim is a commune in the Bas-Rhin department in Grand Est in north-eastern France.

== Geography ==
Surrounding communes are Saessolsheim and Rohr to the north-west, Willgottheim in the south-east, Zeinheim and Westhouse-Marmoutier to the south-west with Maennolsheim and Friedolsheim in the north-west.

Outside the village, much of the commune is devoted to arable agriculture. The commune contains some important employers as a result of which it employs far more people than the number of its residents: there is significant industrial and service sector employment.

The commune hosts the French headquarters of Adidas which employs four hundred people, as well as the Kochersberg hotel complex, a travel agency and an agricultural development business. Nevertheless, a fifth of Landersheim's own population still live from agriculture, with the production of Goat's cheese a specialty.

== History ==
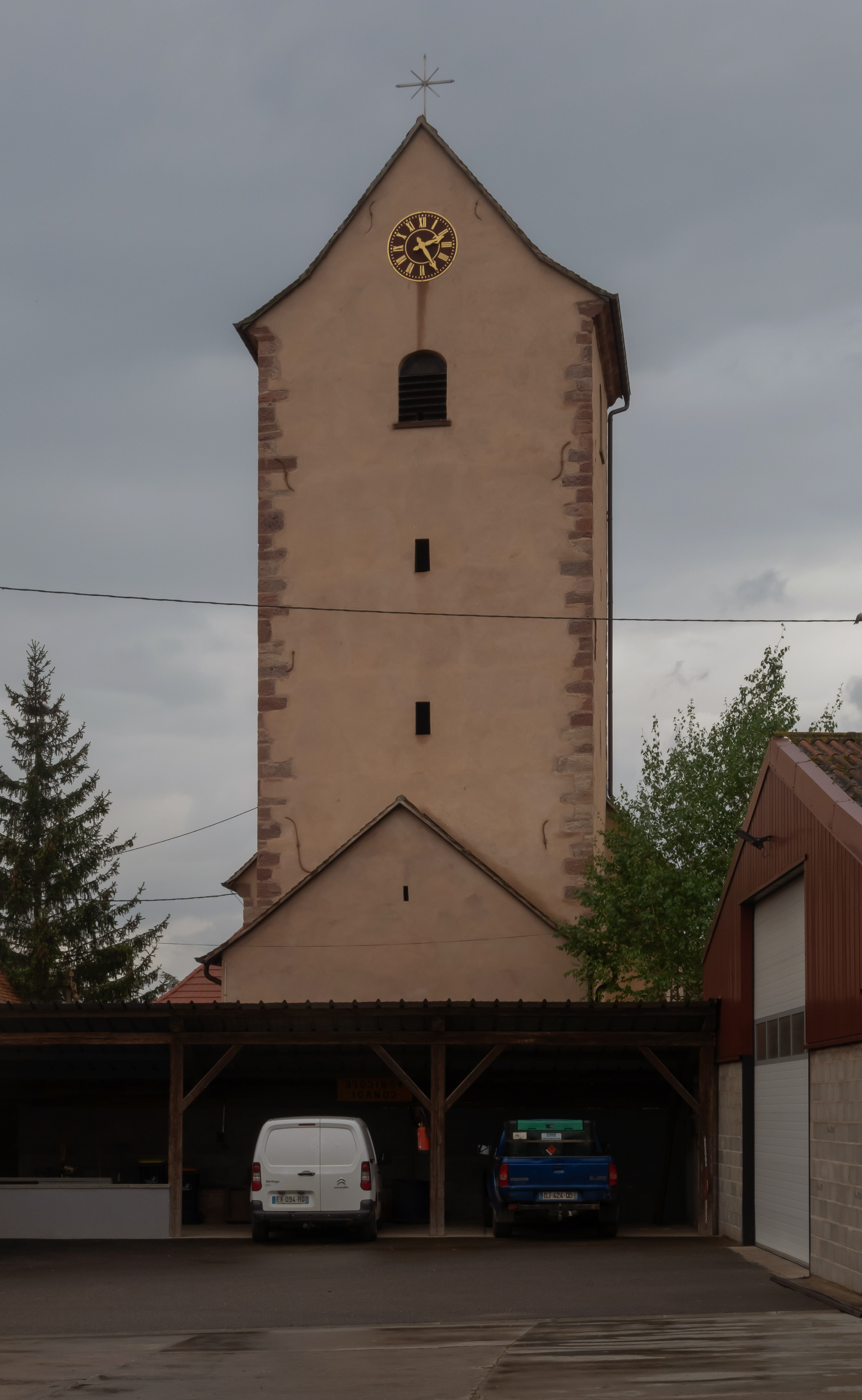
Landersheim, church: l'église Saint-Cyriaque

=== The name ===
Landersheim gets a mention in the Property schedule of Mauersmünster Abbey (“Besitzverzeichnis der Abtei Mauersmünster”) which was produced in the early twelfth century. Here it is named as Lantheresheim ("Lanther's homestead"). In the fourteenth century it turns up as “Lantersen” which becomes “Landersche” in popular parlance. The "Landersheim" spelling first appears in the Middle Ages among the imperial nobility (“Reichsritterschaft”) of lower Alsace.

=== Ownership and religion ===
In 1595 half of the locality was in the possession of the lords of Mittelhausen, which continued until their line came to an end in 1634. They introduced the reformation to the village which remained attached to the Protestant parish of Zehnacker until 1688. The other half of the locality was held by the Holzapfel family in common with the lords of Landsberg, and they also inherited the Mittelhausen share in 1634. They reintroduced the Catholic religion in 1688. A few years later, at the end of the seventeenth century, a large bourgeois family from Strasbourg and Colmar named Weinemer purchased three quarters of the village: the residual quarter remained with the Holzapfels. This ownership structure endured until 1789.

== See also ==
- Communes of the Bas-Rhin department
