= Jetterswiller =

Jetterswiller Jetterschwiller
- Commune
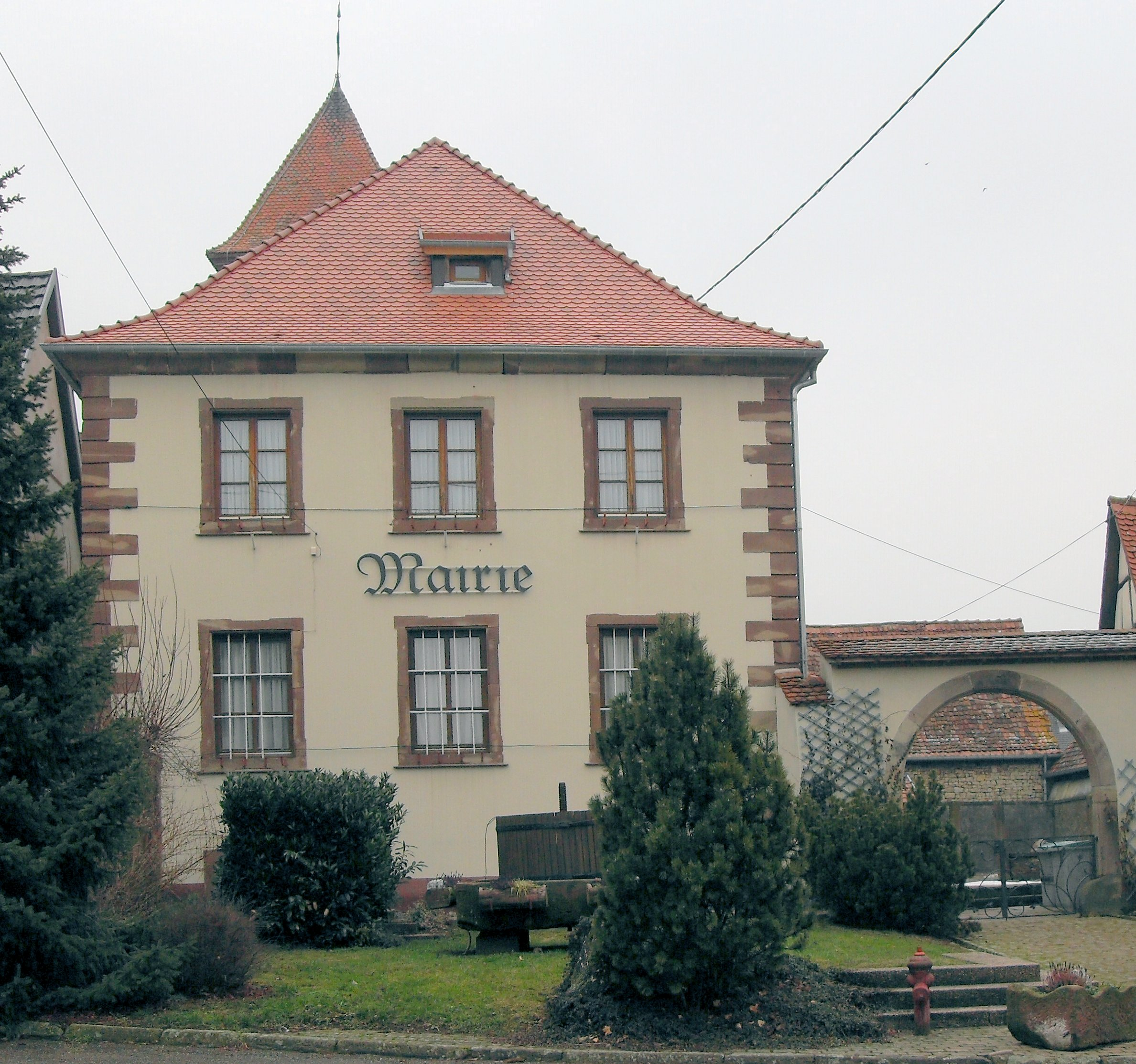
- The town hall in Jetterswiller

- Coat of arms
- Location of Jetterswiller
- Location within France Location within Grand Est
- Coordinates: 48°40′14″N 7°24′56″E
- Country: France
- Region: Grand Est
- Department: Bas-Rhin
- Arrondissement: Molsheim
- Canton: Saverne

Government
  - Mayor (2020–2026): Sarah Moser
- Area^{1}: 3.54 km^{2} (1.37 sq mi)
- Highest elevation: 325 m (1,066 ft)
- Lowest elevation: 230 m (750 ft)
- Population (2023): 180
  - Density: 51/km^{2} (130/sq mi)
- Time zone: UTC+01:00 (CET)
  - Summer (DST): UTC+02:00 (CEST)
- INSEE/Postal code: 67229 /67440
- ^{1} French Land Register data, which excludes lakes, ponds, glaciers > 1 km^{2} (0.386 sq mi or 247 acres) and river estuaries.

Jetterswiller (German: Jettersweiler) is a commune (township) in the Bas-Rhin department in Grand Est in north-eastern France.

== Geography ==
The village is the meeting point of several minor roads: to the west of the village the main road connecting Saverne and Molsheim is within walking distance. The surrounding land is largely devoted to agriculture. Adjacent communes are Reutenbourg to the north, Westhouse-Marmoutier and Knœrsheim to the north-east, Zehnacker to the east, Crastatt to the south-east, and Singrist to the west.

== See also ==
- Communes of the Bas-Rhin department
