= Knœrsheim =

Knœrsheim Knersche
- Commune
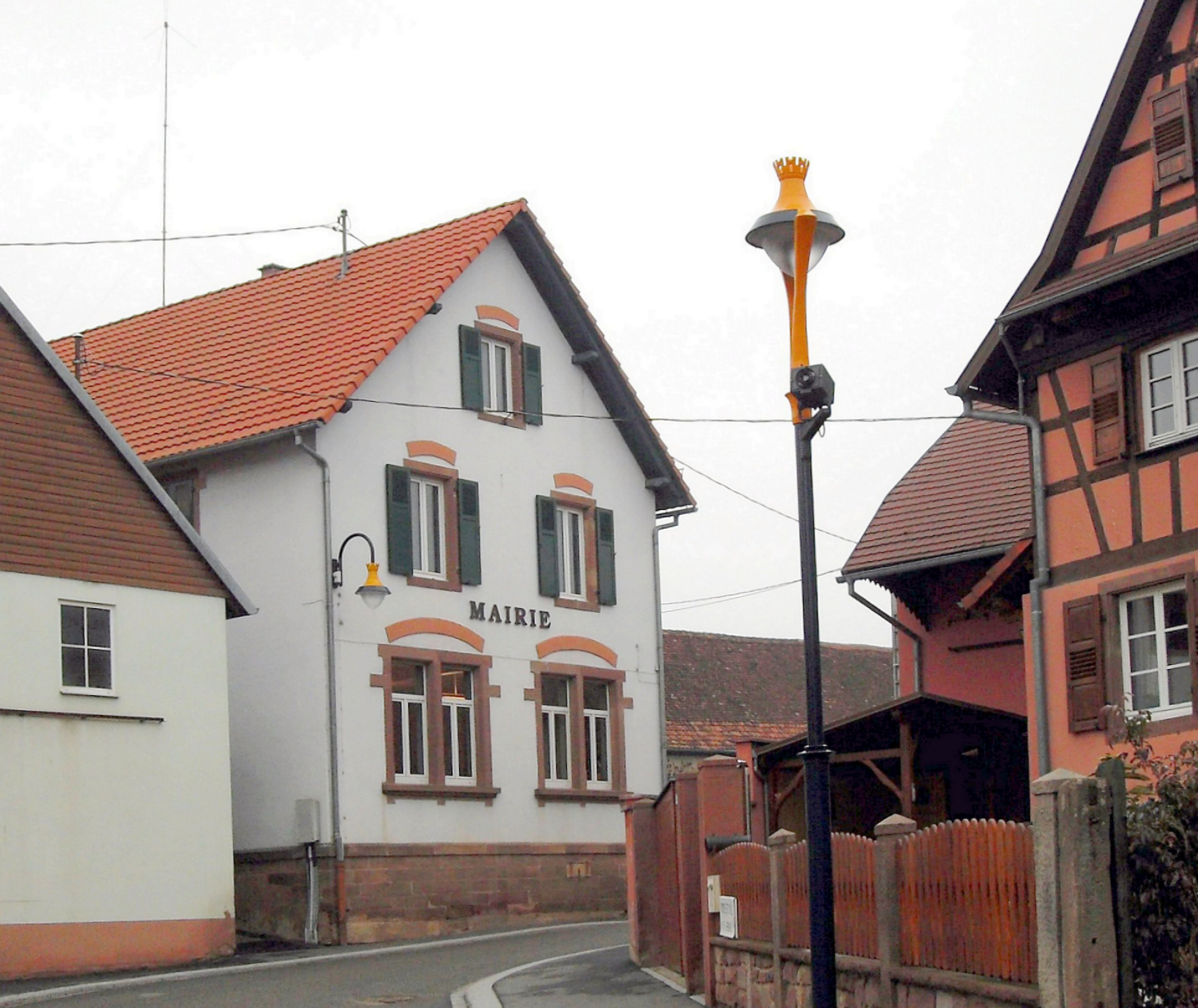
- The town hall in Knœrsheim

- Coat of arms
- Location of Knœrsheim
- Location within France Location within Grand Est
- Coordinates: 48°40′54″N 7°27′42″E
- Country: France
- Region: Grand Est
- Department: Bas-Rhin
- Arrondissement: Molsheim
- Canton: Saverne

Government
  - Mayor (2020–2026): Georges Robitzer
- Area^{1}: 2.36 km^{2} (0.91 sq mi)
- Highest elevation: 285 m (935 ft)
- Lowest elevation: 196 m (643 ft)
- Population (2023): 188
  - Density: 79.7/km^{2} (206/sq mi)
- Time zone: UTC+01:00 (CET)
  - Summer (DST): UTC+02:00 (CEST)
- INSEE/Postal code: 67245 /67310
- ^{1} French Land Register data, which excludes lakes, ponds, glaciers > 1 km^{2} (0.386 sq mi or 247 acres) and river estuaries.

Knœrsheim (French pronunciation: [knœʁsaim]; German: Knörsheim; Alsatian: Knersche) is a commune in the Bas-Rhin department in Grand Est in north-eastern France.

== Geography ==
Knœrsheim is positioned some twelve kilometres (7.5 miles) to the south-east of Saverne. Surrounding communes are Zeinheim and Rangen to the south-east, Zehnacker in the south and Westhouse-Marmoutier to the north-west

== See also ==
- Communes of the Bas-Rhin department
