= Hohengœft =

Hohengœft Hohgäft
- Commune
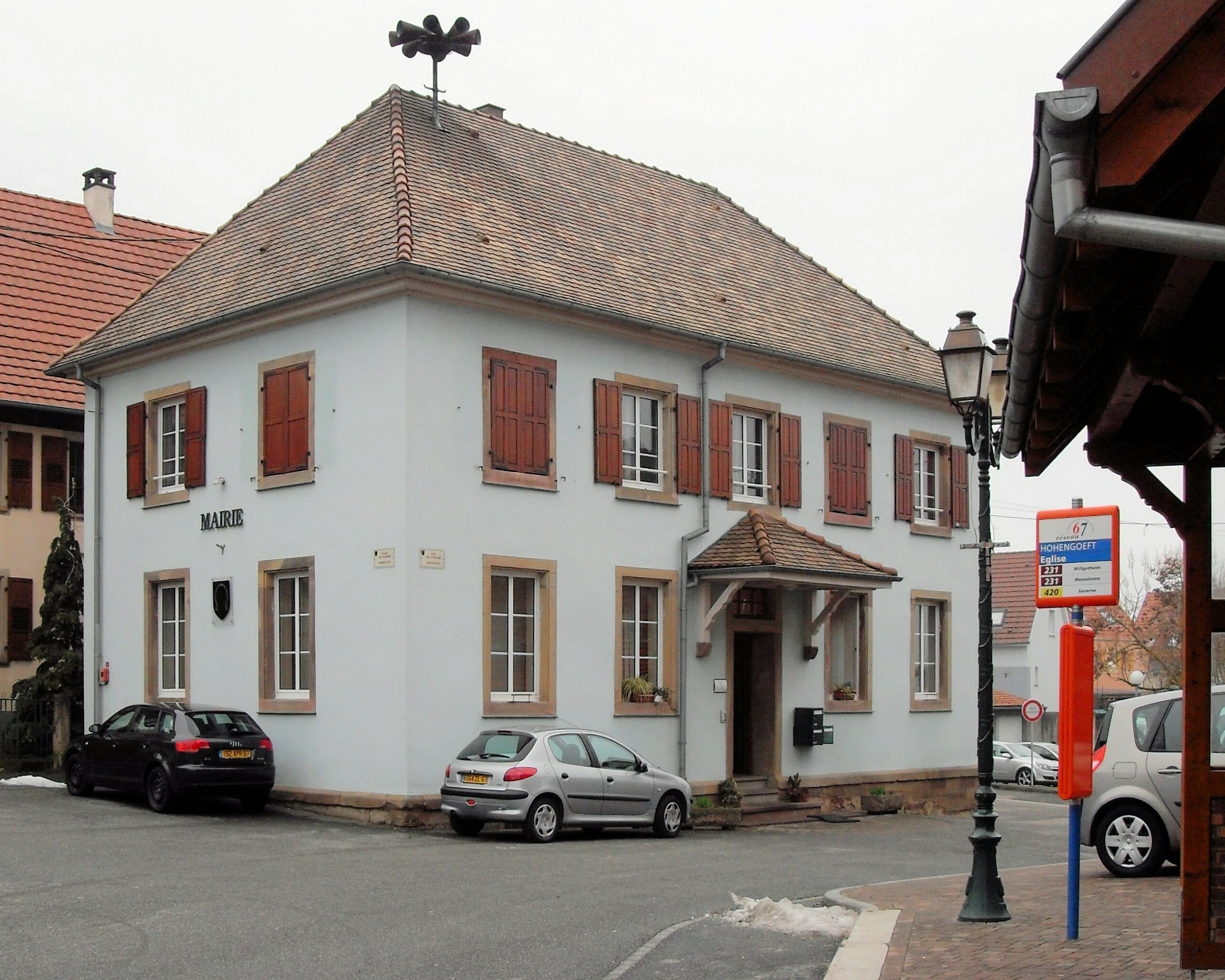
- The town hall in Hohengœft

- Coat of arms
- Location of Hohengœft
- Location within France Location within Grand Est
- Coordinates: 48°39′44″N 7°28′34″E
- Country: France
- Region: Grand Est
- Department: Bas-Rhin
- Arrondissement: Molsheim
- Canton: Saverne

Government
  - Mayor (2020–2026): Pierre-Paul Enger
- Area^{1}: 3.43 km^{2} (1.32 sq mi)
- Highest elevation: 397 m (1,302 ft)
- Lowest elevation: 213 m (699 ft)
- Population (2023): 539
  - Density: 157/km^{2} (407/sq mi)
- Time zone: UTC+01:00 (CET)
  - Summer (DST): UTC+02:00 (CEST)
- INSEE/Postal code: 67208 /67310
- ^{1} French Land Register data, which excludes lakes, ponds, glaciers > 1 km^{2} (0.386 sq mi or 247 acres) and river estuaries.

Hohengœft (French pronunciation: [oənɡœft]; German: Hohengöft) is a commune in the Bas-Rhin department in Grand Est in north-eastern France.

== Geography ==
Through the entire village runs the departmental road RD25, which cuts across the surrounding farmland. The highest point, the Goeftberg, rises to 397 meters above sea level.

Adjacent communes are Rangen and Willgottheim in the north-east, Wintzenheim-Kochersberg to the east, Kuttolsheim and Nordheim in the south-east, Wasselonne in the south-west, Crastatt to the west and Zehnacker in the north-west.

== Interesting sights ==
The beautiful Gœftberg hill, coated in well tended grass on a limestone soil, is a defining feature of the village. The chapel of St Wendelin, constructed in 1666 as a thanksgiving after the village was spared from an outbreak of plague, can also be found here, along with a depiction of the Stations of the Cross dating from 1772. Each year on the Monday after Pentecost a pilgrimage mass is celebrated in front of the chapel.

At the top of the Gœftberg is the 130 meter high Nordheim radio and television mast.

Each June the grass on the hill is embellished with numerous wild orchids.

== See also ==
- Communes of the Bas-Rhin department
