= Kleingœft =

Kleingœft Klängäft
- Commune
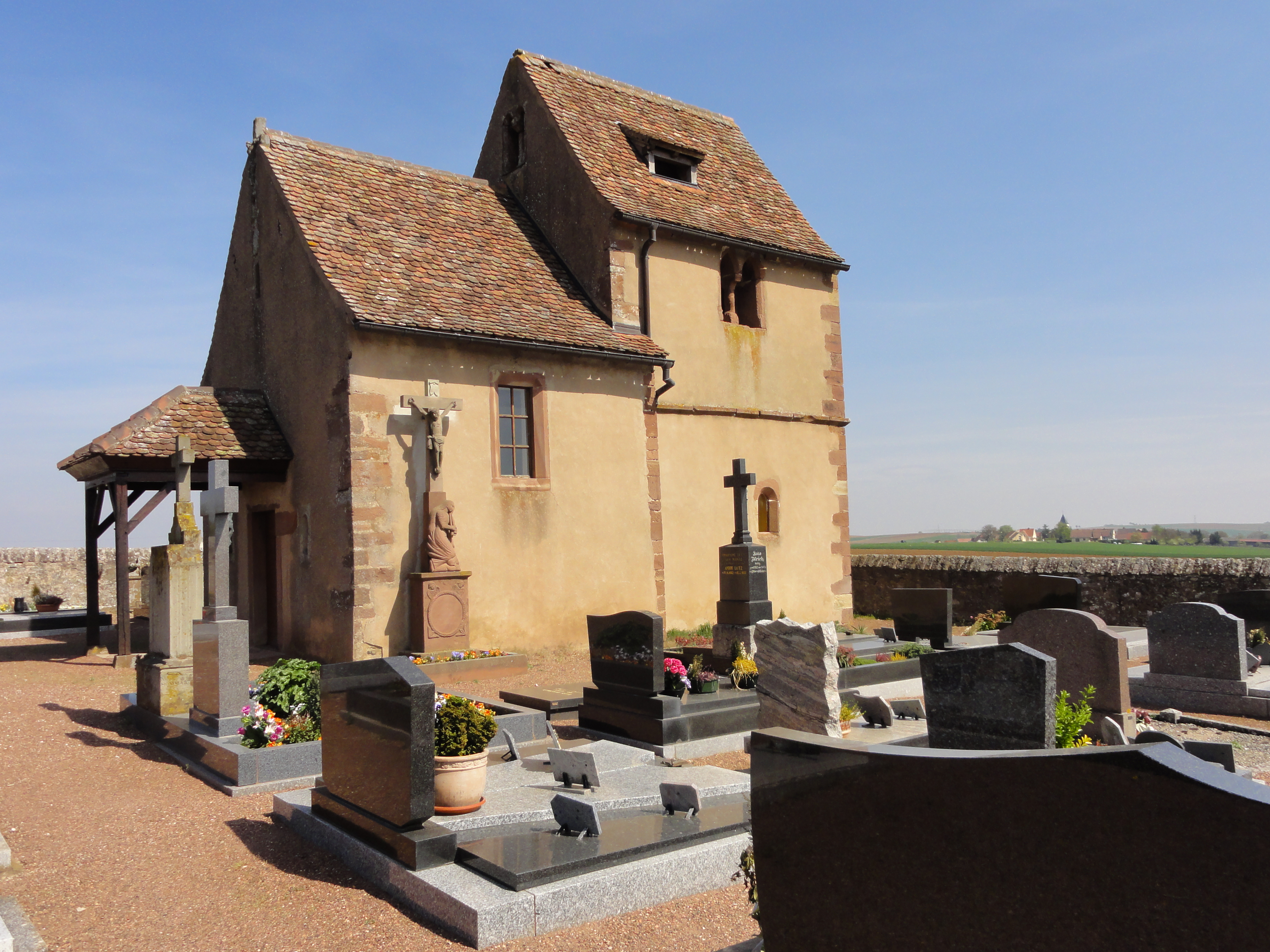
- The chapel in Kleingœft

- Coat of arms
- Location of Kleingœft
- Location within France Location within Grand Est
- Coordinates: 48°41′29″N 7°26′39″E
- Country: France
- Region: Grand Est
- Department: Bas-Rhin
- Arrondissement: Saverne
- Canton: Saverne
- Intercommunality: Pays de Saverne

Government
  - Mayor (2020–2026): François Willem
- Area^{1}: 2.50 km^{2} (0.97 sq mi)
- Highest elevation: 261 m (856 ft)
- Lowest elevation: 214 m (702 ft)
- Population (2023): 169
  - Density: 67.6/km^{2} (175/sq mi)
- Time zone: UTC+01:00 (CET)
  - Summer (DST): UTC+02:00 (CEST)
- INSEE/Postal code: 67244 /67440
- ^{1} French Land Register data, which excludes lakes, ponds, glaciers > 1 km^{2} (0.386 sq mi or 247 acres) and river estuaries.

Kleingœft (German: Kleingöft) is a commune in the Bas-Rhin department in Grand Est in north-eastern France.

== Geography ==
Surrounding communes are Wolschheim and Maennolsheim to the northeast; Westhouse-Marmoutier to the southeast; and Lochwiller to the west.

== Landmarks ==
- Chapel of Betbur

Constructed in the twelfth century, the chapel was originally the parish church of Betbur. Betbur was destroyed during or before the German Peasants' War, and a new village was constructed nearby on the site of what is now known as Kleingœft. The chapel retained its role as a parish church, now being the parish church of Kleingœft, its cemetery being the Kleingœft village cemetery. Later a new larger church was built in the centre of Kleingœft, but the Chapel of Betbur is still open and can be visited: occasionally religious services are still celebrated in it.

== See also ==
- Communes of the Bas-Rhin department
