= Communities of Communes of the Bas-Rhin département =

The département of Bas-Rhin includes 1 urban community and 46 Communities of Communes gathering 517 communes over the 526 of the département. The commune of Siltzheim is part of the agglomeration community Sarreguemines Confluences which is in the département of Moselle.

== Urban Communities ==
- Urban Community of Strasbourg

== Agglomeration communities ==
(none)

== Communities of Communes ==
- Community of Communes Ackerland
- Community of Communes of the Alsace Bossue
- Community of Communes of the lower Zorn
- Community of Communes of Benfeld and surroundings
- Community of Communes of the Bernstein and the Ungersberg
- Community of Communes of Bischwiller and surroundings
- Community of Communes of the canton of Rosheim
- Community of Communes of the canton of Villé
- Community of Communes of the Carrefour des Trois Croix
- Community of Communes the Castles
- Community of Communes of the Coteaux of the Mossig
- Community of Communes of the Espace Rhénan
- Community of Communes of Gambsheim-Kilstett
- Community of Communes of the Grand Ried
- Community of Communes of the Hattgau and surroundings
- Community of Communes of the Upper-Bruche
- Community of Communes of the Kochersberg
- Community of Communes of the Lauter
- Community of Communes of Marckolsheim and surroundings
- Community of Communes of the Country of Erstein
- Community of Communes of the Country of Hanau
- Community of Communes of the Country of Marmoutier
- Community of Communes of the Country of Niederbronn-les-Bains
- Community of Communes of the Country of La Petite-Pierre
- Community of Communes of the Country of Sainte-Odile
- Community of Communes of the Country of Sarre-Union
- Community of Communes of the Country of Wissembourg
- Community of Communes of the Country of the Zorn
- Community of Communes of Pechelbronn
- Community of Communes of the Piedmont of Barr
- Community of Communes of the plain of the Sauer and the Seltzbach
- Community of Communes of the Vineyard's Gate
- Community of Communes of the region of Brumath
- Community of Communes of the region of Haguenau
- Community of Communes of the region of Saverne
- Community of Communes of the region of Molsheim-Mutzig
- Community of Communes of the Rhine
- Community of Communes Rhine-Moder
- Community of Communes of Sélestat
- Community of Communes of Seltz Delta of the Sauer
- Community of Communes of the Sommerau
- Community of Communes of the Soultzerland
- Community of Communes of the Uffried
- Community of Communes of the Moder Valley
- Community of Communes of the Sauer Valley
- Community of Communes of the Villages of the Kehlbach

== Communes not linked to any community ==
- Bitschhoffen
- Heiligenberg
- Jetterswiller
- Kleingoeft
- Niederhaslach
- Oberhaslach
- Still
- Urmatt
