= Friedolsheim =

Friedolsheim Freedelse
- Commune
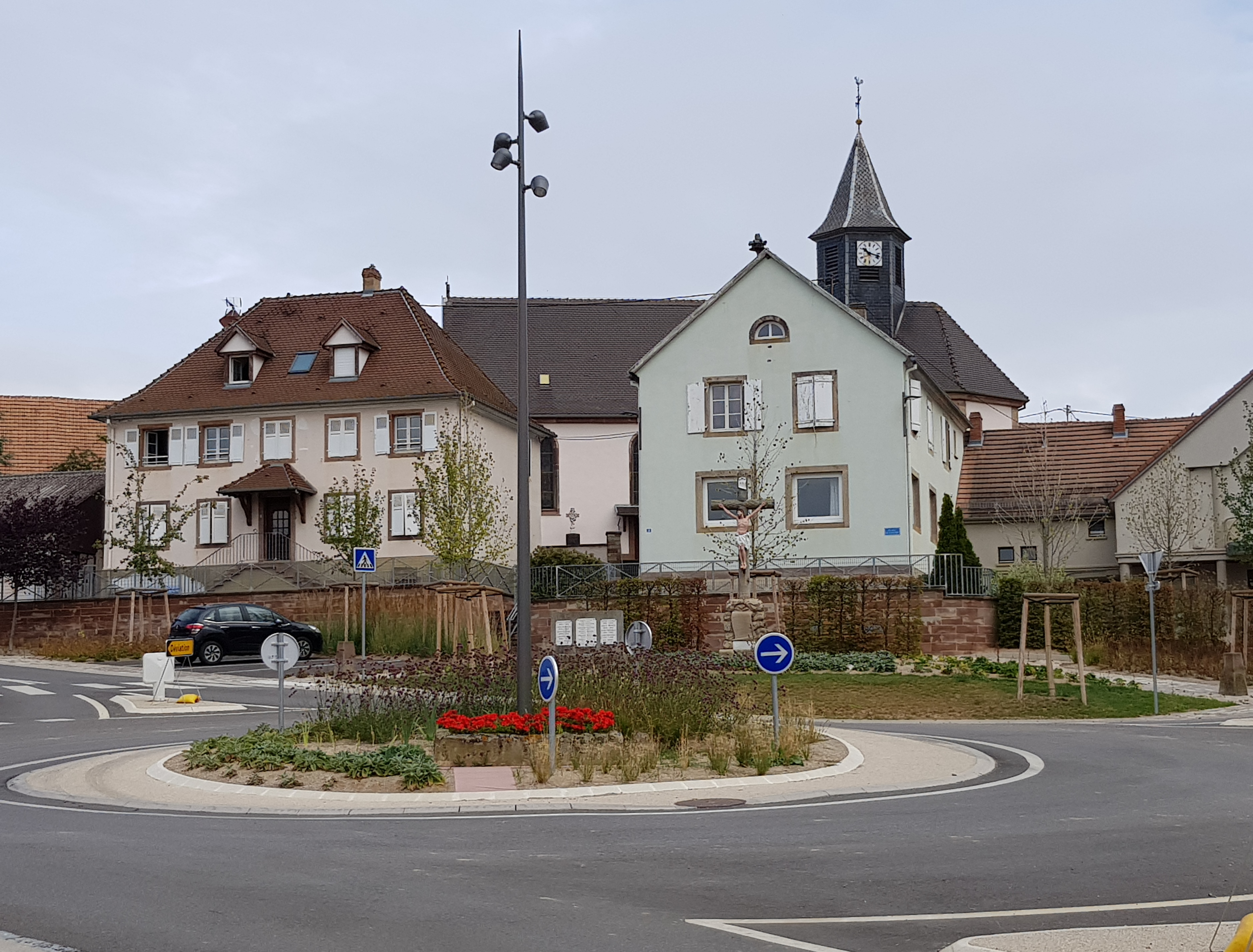
- The church and surroundings in Friedolsheim

- Coat of arms
- Location of Friedolsheim
- Location within France Location within Grand Est
- Coordinates: 48°42′26″N 7°29′07″E
- Country: France
- Region: Grand Est
- Department: Bas-Rhin
- Arrondissement: Saverne
- Canton: Saverne

Government
  - Mayor (2020–2026): André Schott
- Area^{1}: 3.52 km^{2} (1.36 sq mi)
- Highest elevation: 263 m (863 ft)
- Lowest elevation: 194 m (636 ft)
- Population (2023): 263
  - Density: 74.7/km^{2} (194/sq mi)
- Time zone: UTC+01:00 (CET)
  - Summer (DST): UTC+02:00 (CEST)
- INSEE/Postal code: 67145 /67490
- ^{1} French Land Register data, which excludes lakes, ponds, glaciers > 1 km^{2} (0.386 sq mi or 247 acres) and river estuaries.

Friedolsheim (French pronunciation: [fʁidɔlsaim]; Alsatian: Freedelse) is a commune in the Bas-Rhin department in Grand Est in north-eastern France.

== History ==
The village's origins stretch back into antiquity. Many Gallo-Roman remains have been found along with the remains of a road dating back to the second century. The first written reference to Friedolsheim is 770 when it was included in the property of the Abbey of Fulda. A further reference dates from 826 when the village was called Friedesheim and enjoyed a privileged status of direct control under the empire: the village was part of the Bailiwick of Kochersberg, subject to the joint and indivisible control of the Holy Roman Emperor and of the Bishop of Strasbourg. In 1496, the emperor's portion was acquired by the City of Strasbourg.

Friedolsheim came under the parish of Maennolsheim until 1343 when, for ecclesiastical purposes, it passed to the authority of the rural chaplaincy of Betbur, a village near the present site of Kleingœft which disappeared in the wake of the Peasants' Revolt of 1493. In 1803 Friedolsheim became a stand-alone parish.

== See also ==
- Communes of the Bas-Rhin department
