= Bouxwiller =

Bouxwiller is the name of the following communes in France:

- Bouxwiller, Bas-Rhin, in the Bas-Rhin department
- Bouxwiller, Haut-Rhin, in the Haut-Rhin department
