= Canton of Saverne =

Coordinates: 48.74°N 7.36°E

- Canton
- Situation of the canton of Saverne in the department of Bas-Rhin
- Country: France
- Region: Grand Est
- Department: Bas-Rhin
- No. of communes: {{{nbcomm}}}
- Population (2023): 49,595
- INSEE code: 6714

The canton of Saverne is an administrative division of the Bas-Rhin department, northeastern France. Its borders were modified at the French canton reorganisation which came into effect in March 2015. Its seat is in Saverne.

It consists of the following communes:

1. Altenheim
2. Balbronn
3. Cosswiller
4. Crastatt
5. Dettwiller
6. Dimbsthal
7. Eckartswiller
8. Ernolsheim-lès-Saverne
9. Friedolsheim
10. Furchhausen
11. Gottenhouse
12. Gottesheim
13. Haegen
14. Hattmatt
15. Hengwiller
16. Hohengœft
17. Jetterswiller
18. Kleingœft
19. Knœrsheim
20. Landersheim
21. Littenheim
22. Lochwiller
23. Lupstein
24. Maennolsheim
25. Marmoutier
26. Monswiller
27. Ottersthal
28. Otterswiller
29. Printzheim
30. Rangen
31. Reinhardsmunster
32. Reutenbourg
33. Romanswiller
34. Saessolsheim
35. Saint-Jean-Saverne
36. Saverne
37. Schwenheim
38. Sommerau
39. Steinbourg
40. Thal-Marmoutier
41. Traenheim
42. Waldolwisheim
43. Wangenbourg-Engenthal
44. Wasselonne
45. Westhoffen
46. Westhouse-Marmoutier
47. Wolschheim
48. Zehnacker
49. Zeinheim
