= Waldolwisheim =

- Commune
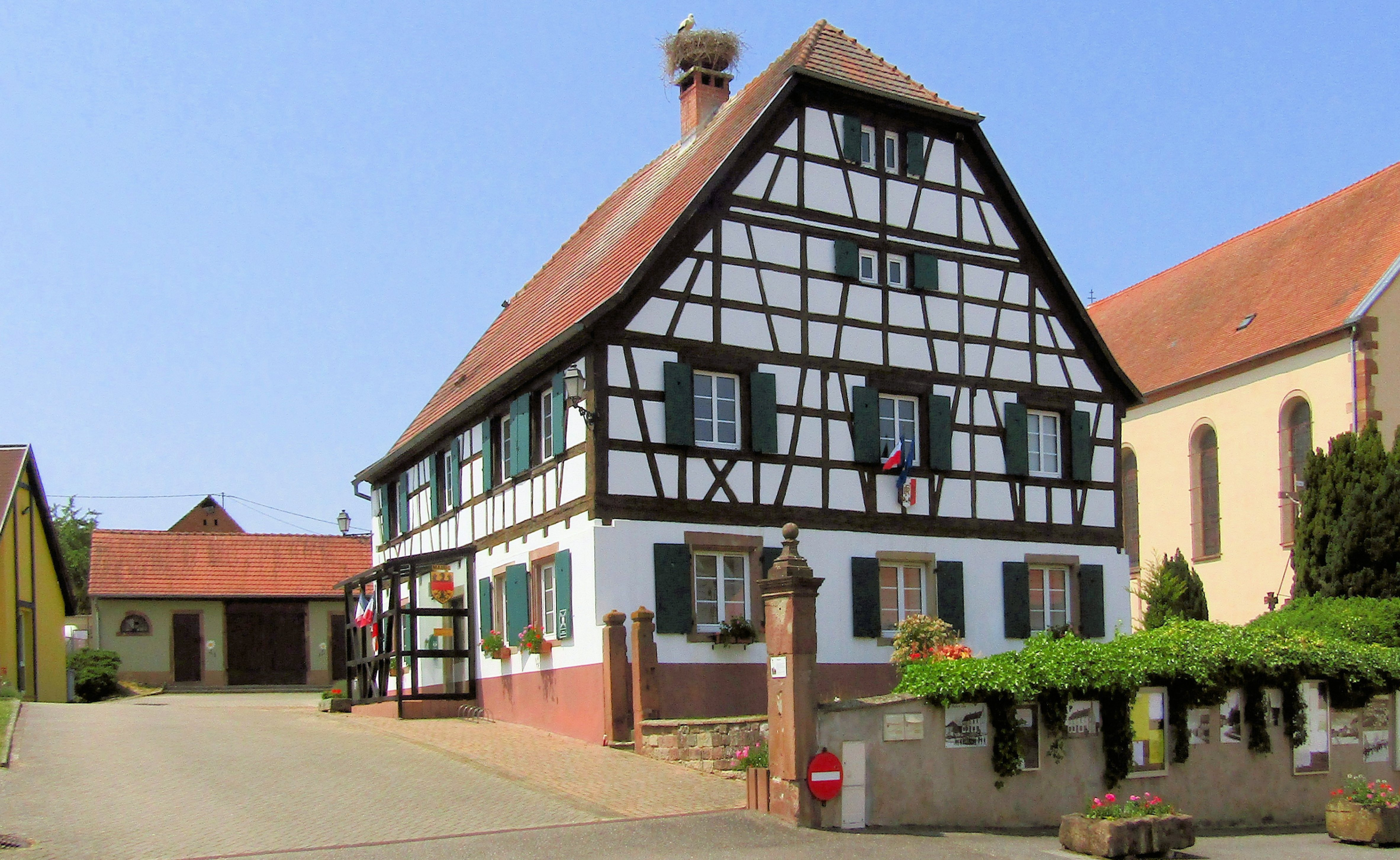
- The new townhall of Waldolwisheim

- Coat of arms
- Location of Waldolwisheim
- Location within France Location within Grand Est
- Coordinates: 48°44′00″N 7°26′20″E
- Country: France
- Region: Grand Est
- Department: Bas-Rhin
- Arrondissement: Saverne
- Canton: Saverne
- Intercommunality: Pays de Saverne

Government
  - Mayor (2020–2026): Marc Wintz
- Area^{1}: 5.65 km^{2} (2.18 sq mi)
- Elevation: 210 m (690 ft)
- Highest elevation: 229 m (751 ft)
- Lowest elevation: 167 m (548 ft)
- Population (2023): 540
  - Density: 96/km^{2} (250/sq mi)
- Time zone: UTC+01:00 (CET)
  - Summer (DST): UTC+02:00 (CEST)
- INSEE/Postal code: 67515 /67700
- ^{1} French Land Register data, which excludes lakes, ponds, glaciers > 1 km^{2} (0.386 sq mi or 247 acres) and river estuaries.

Waldolwisheim (French pronunciation: [valdɔlvisaim]; Alsatian: Wololse) is a commune in the Bas-Rhin department in Grand Est in north-eastern France.

== Population ==
Historical population
Year	Pop.	±% p.a.
1968	465	—
1975	465	+0.00%
1982	562	+2.74%
1990	562	+0.00%
1999	530	−0.65%
2007	538	+0.19%
2012	542	+0.15%
2017	574	+1.15%
2023	540	−1.01%
Source: INSEE

== See also ==
- Communes of the Bas-Rhin department
