= Ottersthal =

- Commune
- Coat of arms
- Location of Ottersthal
- Location within France Location within Grand Est
- Coordinates: 48°45′19″N 7°21′05″E
- Country: France
- Region: Grand Est
- Department: Bas-Rhin
- Arrondissement: Saverne
- Canton: Saverne

Government
  - Mayor (2020–2026): Daniel Gerard
- Area^{1}: 3.13 km^{2} (1.21 sq mi)
- Highest elevation: 418 m (1,371 ft)
- Lowest elevation: 194 m (636 ft)
- Population (2023): 805
  - Density: 257/km^{2} (666/sq mi)
- Time zone: UTC+01:00 (CET)
  - Summer (DST): UTC+02:00 (CEST)
- INSEE/Postal code: 67366 /67700
- ^{1} French Land Register data, which excludes lakes, ponds, glaciers > 1 km^{2} (0.386 sq mi or 247 acres) and river estuaries.

Ottersthal (French pronunciation: [ɔtəʁstal]; German: Otterstal) is a commune in the Bas-Rhin department in Grand Est in north-eastern France.

== See also ==
- Communes of the Bas-Rhin department
