= Gottesheim =

Gottesheim Gottsne
- Commune
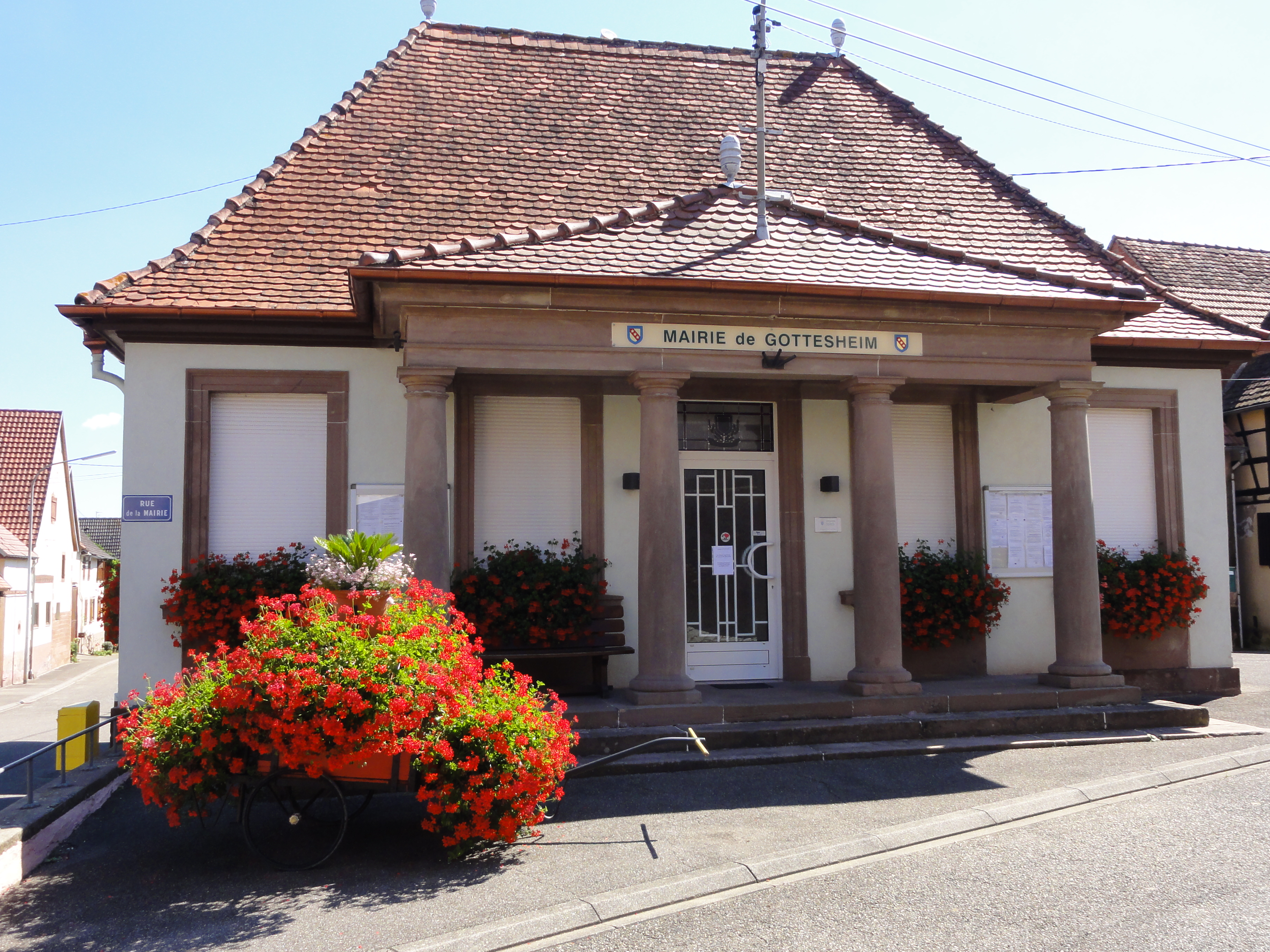
- The town hall in Gottesheim

- Coat of arms
- Location of Gottesheim
- Location within France Location within Grand Est
- Coordinates: 48°46′32″N 7°28′51″E
- Country: France
- Region: Grand Est
- Department: Bas-Rhin
- Arrondissement: Saverne
- Canton: Saverne

Government
  - Mayor (2020–2026): Elisabeth Muller
- Area^{1}: 5.11 km^{2} (1.97 sq mi)
- Highest elevation: 252 m (827 ft)
- Lowest elevation: 182 m (597 ft)
- Population (2023): 358
  - Density: 70.1/km^{2} (181/sq mi)
- Time zone: UTC+01:00 (CET)
  - Summer (DST): UTC+02:00 (CEST)
- INSEE/Postal code: 67162 /67490
- ^{1} French Land Register data, which excludes lakes, ponds, glaciers > 1 km^{2} (0.386 sq mi or 247 acres) and river estuaries.

Gottesheim (French pronunciation: [ɡɔtəsaim]; Alsatian: Gottsne) is a commune in the Bas-Rhin department in Grand Est in north-eastern France.

The economy is based on agriculture.

== See also ==
- Communes of the Bas-Rhin department
