= Littenheim =

Littenheim Littne
- Commune
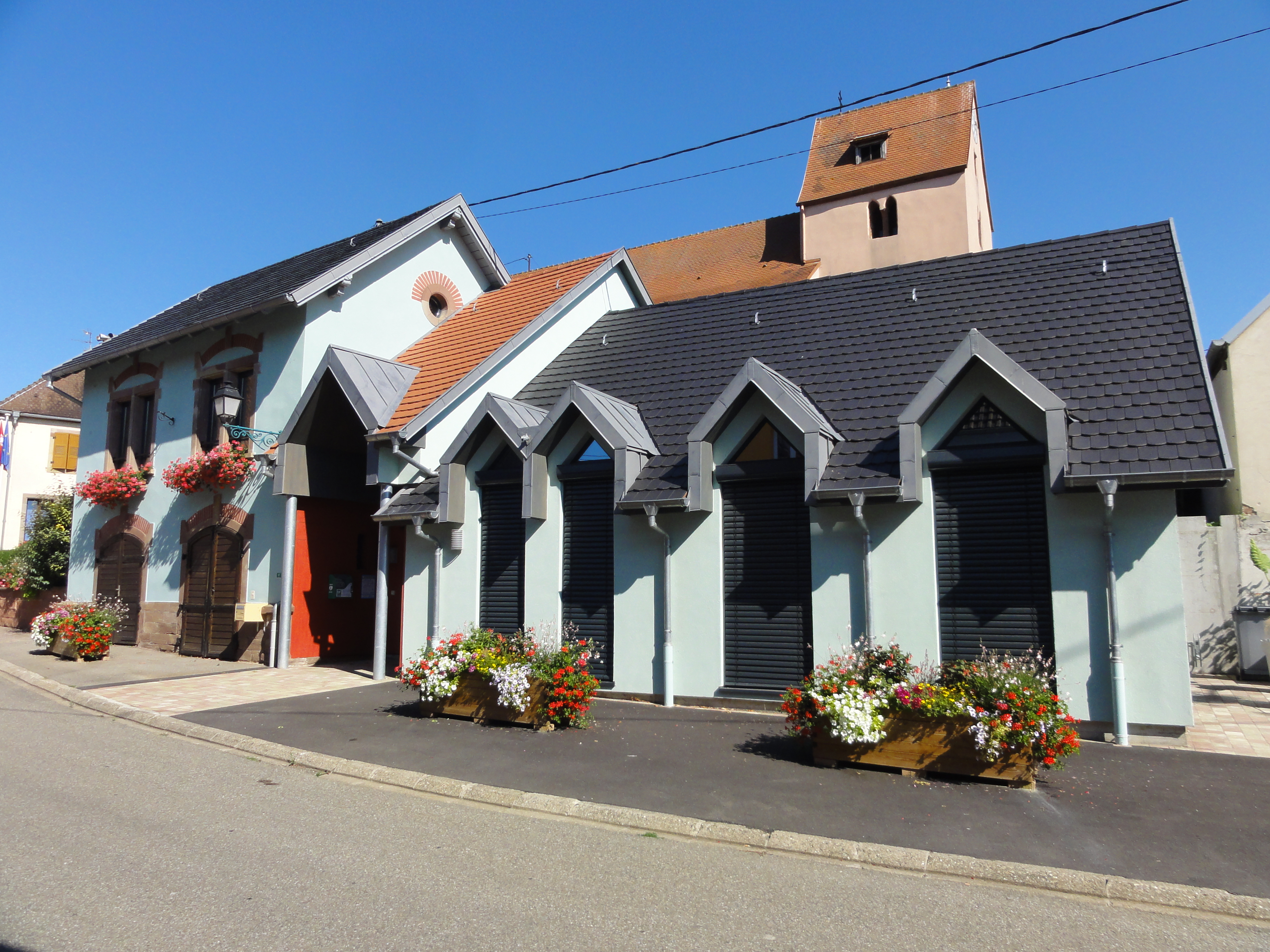
- The town hall in Littenheim

- Coat of arms
- Location of Littenheim
- Location within France Location within Grand Est
- Coordinates: 48°43′46″N 7°29′21″E
- Country: France
- Region: Grand Est
- Department: Bas-Rhin
- Arrondissement: Saverne
- Canton: Saverne
- Intercommunality: CC Pays de Saverne

Government
  - Mayor (2020–2026): Bernard Sonnenmoser
- Area^{1}: 4.21 km^{2} (1.63 sq mi)
- Highest elevation: 258 m (846 ft)
- Lowest elevation: 168 m (551 ft)
- Population (2023): 297
  - Density: 70.5/km^{2} (183/sq mi)
- Time zone: UTC+01:00 (CET)
  - Summer (DST): UTC+02:00 (CEST)
- INSEE/Postal code: 67269 /67490
- ^{1} French Land Register data, which excludes lakes, ponds, glaciers > 1 km^{2} (0.386 sq mi or 247 acres) and river estuaries.

Littenheim (French pronunciation: [litənaim]; Alsatian: Littne) is a commune in the Bas-Rhin department in Grand Est in north-eastern France.

== See also ==
- Communes of the Bas-Rhin department
