= Traenheim =

Traenheim Draane
- Commune
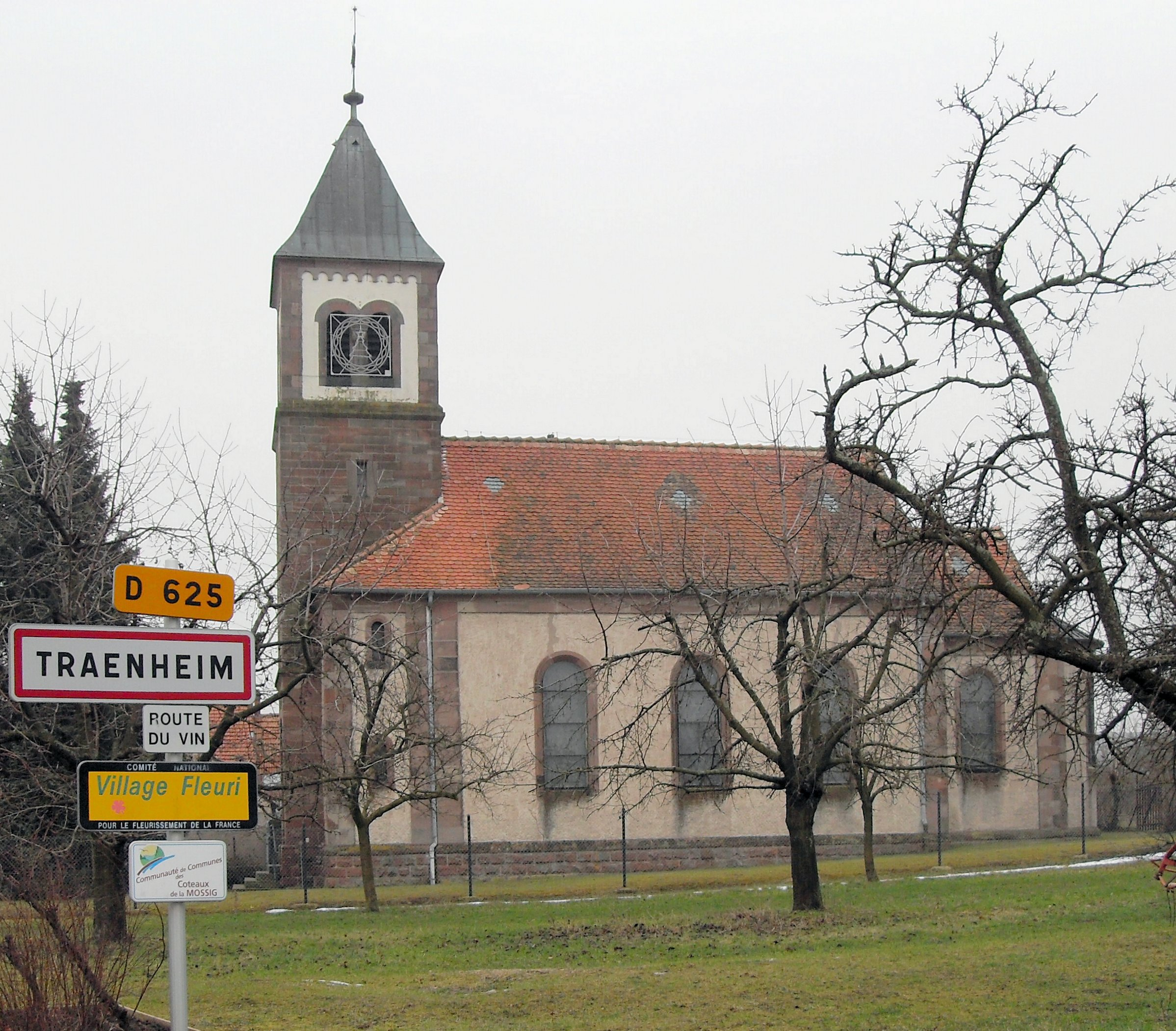
- The catholic church in Traenheim

- Coat of arms
- Location of Traenheim
- Location within France Location within Grand Est
- Coordinates: 48°35′46″N 7°27′59″E
- Country: France
- Region: Grand Est
- Department: Bas-Rhin
- Arrondissement: Molsheim
- Canton: Saverne

Government
  - Mayor (2020–2026): Gérard Strohmenger
- Area^{1}: 3.1 km^{2} (1.2 sq mi)
- Highest elevation: 265 m (869 ft)
- Lowest elevation: 174 m (571 ft)
- Population (2023): 655
  - Density: 210/km^{2} (550/sq mi)
- Time zone: UTC+01:00 (CET)
  - Summer (DST): UTC+02:00 (CEST)
- INSEE/Postal code: 67492 /67310
- ^{1} French Land Register data, which excludes lakes, ponds, glaciers > 1 km^{2} (0.386 sq mi or 247 acres) and river estuaries.

Traenheim (French pronunciation: [tʁɛnaim]; German: Tränheim; Alsatian: Draane) is a commune in the Bas-Rhin department in Grand Est in north-eastern France.

A Jewish house church from 1723 survives. It is an upstairs room in a half-timbered house renovated for use as a place of public worship over the "vociferous" objections of the town's pastor but with the permission of the government. The room still has Hebrew prayers on the walls.

== See also ==
- Communes of the Bas-Rhin department
