= Romanswiller =

- Commune
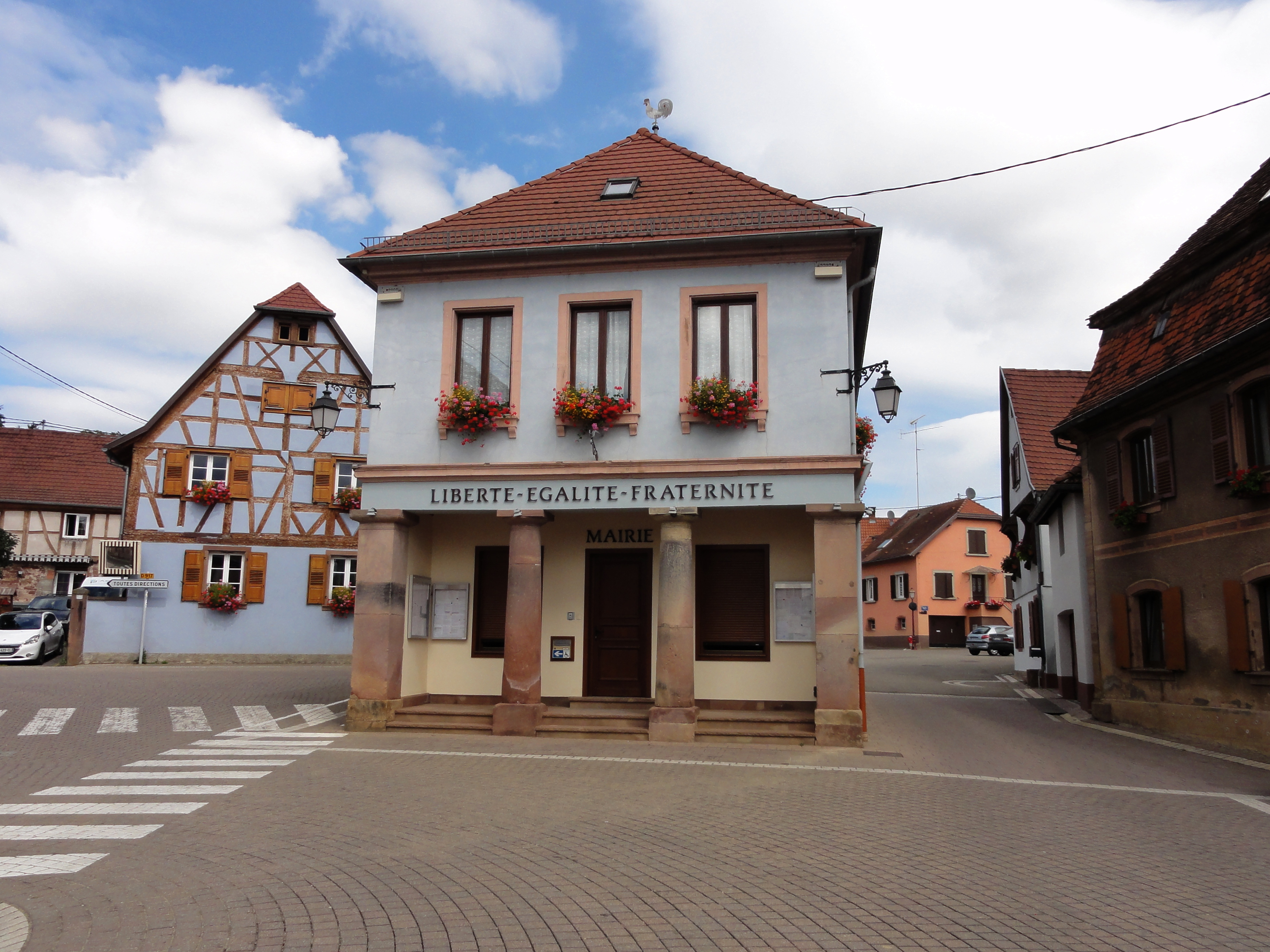
- The town hall in Romanswiller

- Coat of arms
- Location of Romanswiller
- Location within France Location within Grand Est
- Coordinates: 48°38′46″N 7°24′27″E
- Country: France
- Region: Grand Est
- Department: Bas-Rhin
- Arrondissement: Molsheim
- Canton: Saverne

Government
  - Mayor (2020–2026): Dominique Hermann
- Area^{1}: 11.42 km^{2} (4.41 sq mi)
- Highest elevation: 482 m (1,581 ft)
- Lowest elevation: 215 m (705 ft)
- Population (2023): 1,180
  - Density: 103/km^{2} (268/sq mi)
- Time zone: UTC+01:00 (CET)
  - Summer (DST): UTC+02:00 (CEST)
- INSEE/Postal code: 67408 /67310
- ^{1} French Land Register data, which excludes lakes, ponds, glaciers > 1 km^{2} (0.386 sq mi or 247 acres) and river estuaries.

Romanswiller (German: Romansweiler) is a commune in the Bas-Rhin department in Grand Est in north-eastern France.

== See also ==
- Communes of the Bas-Rhin department
