= Cosswiller =

Cosswiller Kosswiller
- Commune
- Coat of arms
- Location of Cosswiller
- Location within France Location within Grand Est
- Coordinates: 48°37′54″N 7°23′58″E
- Country: France
- Region: Grand Est
- Department: Bas-Rhin
- Arrondissement: Molsheim
- Canton: Saverne

Government
  - Mayor (2020–2026): François Schneider
- Area^{1}: 15.75 km^{2} (6.08 sq mi)
- Highest elevation: 693 m (2,274 ft)
- Lowest elevation: 216 m (709 ft)
- Population (2023): 610
  - Density: 39/km^{2} (100/sq mi)
- Time zone: UTC+01:00 (CET)
  - Summer (DST): UTC+02:00 (CEST)
- INSEE/Postal code: 67077 /67310
- ^{1} French Land Register data, which excludes lakes, ponds, glaciers > 1 km^{2} (0.386 sq mi or 247 acres) and river estuaries.

Cosswiller (French pronunciation: [kɔsvilɛʁ]; German: Koßweiler) is a commune in the Bas-Rhin department in Grand Est in north-eastern France.

== See also ==
- Communes of the Bas-Rhin department
