= Furchhausen =

Furchhausen Furichhüse
- Commune
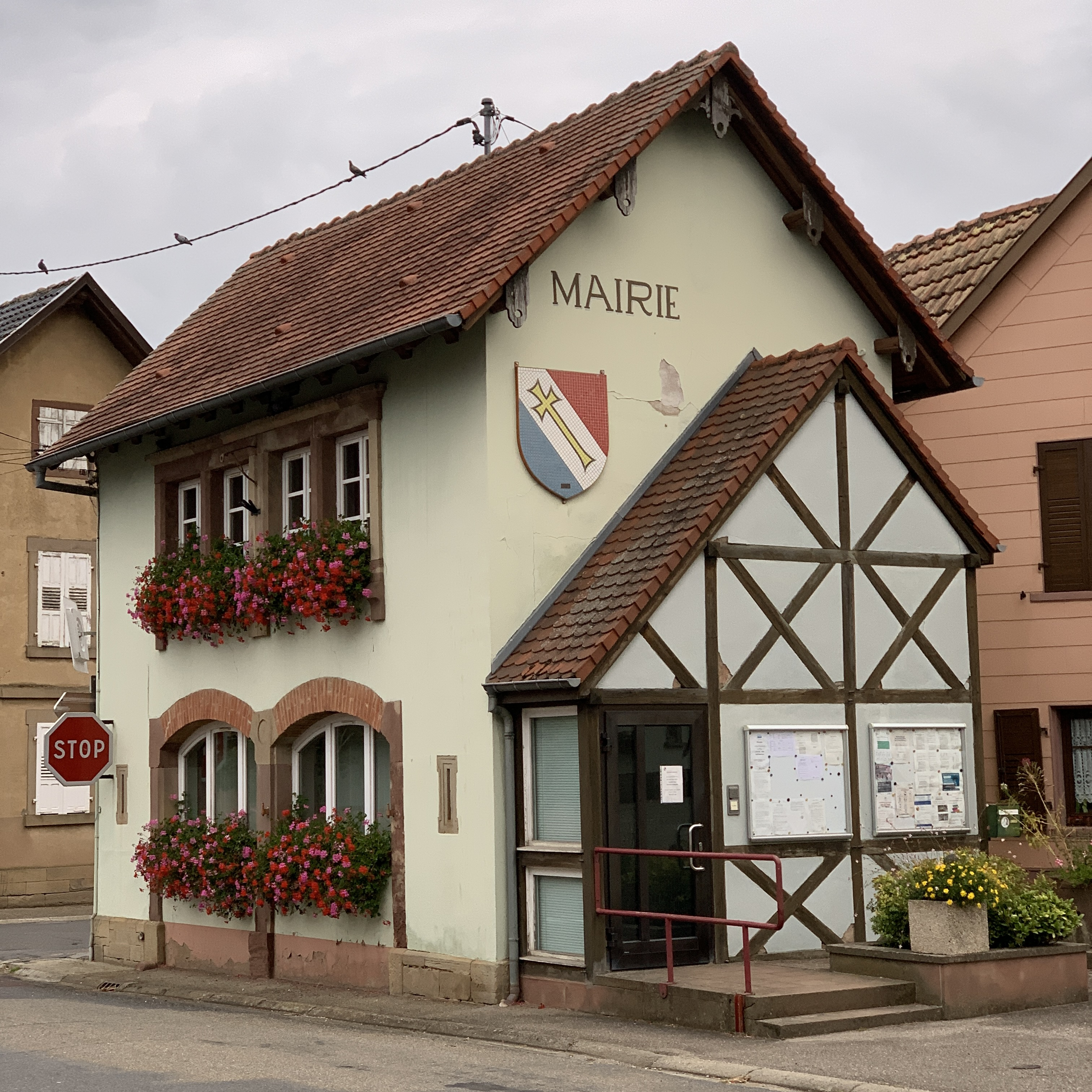
- Town hall

- Coat of arms
- Location of Furchhausen
- Location within France Location within Grand Est
- Coordinates: 48°43′08″N 7°26′20″E
- Country: France
- Region: Grand Est
- Department: Bas-Rhin
- Arrondissement: Saverne
- Canton: Saverne

Government
  - Mayor (2020–2026): Denis Hittinger
- Area^{1}: 2.86 km^{2} (1.10 sq mi)
- Highest elevation: 251 m (823 ft)
- Lowest elevation: 195 m (640 ft)
- Population (2023): 376
  - Density: 131/km^{2} (341/sq mi)
- Time zone: UTC+01:00 (CET)
  - Summer (DST): UTC+02:00 (CEST)
- INSEE/Postal code: 67149 /67700
- ^{1} French Land Register data, which excludes lakes, ponds, glaciers > 1 km^{2} (0.386 sq mi or 247 acres) and river estuaries.

Furchhausen is a commune in the Bas-Rhin department in Grand Est in north-eastern France. It is part of the historical and cultural region of Alsace.

== See also ==
- Communes of the Bas-Rhin department
