= Schwenheim =

- Commune
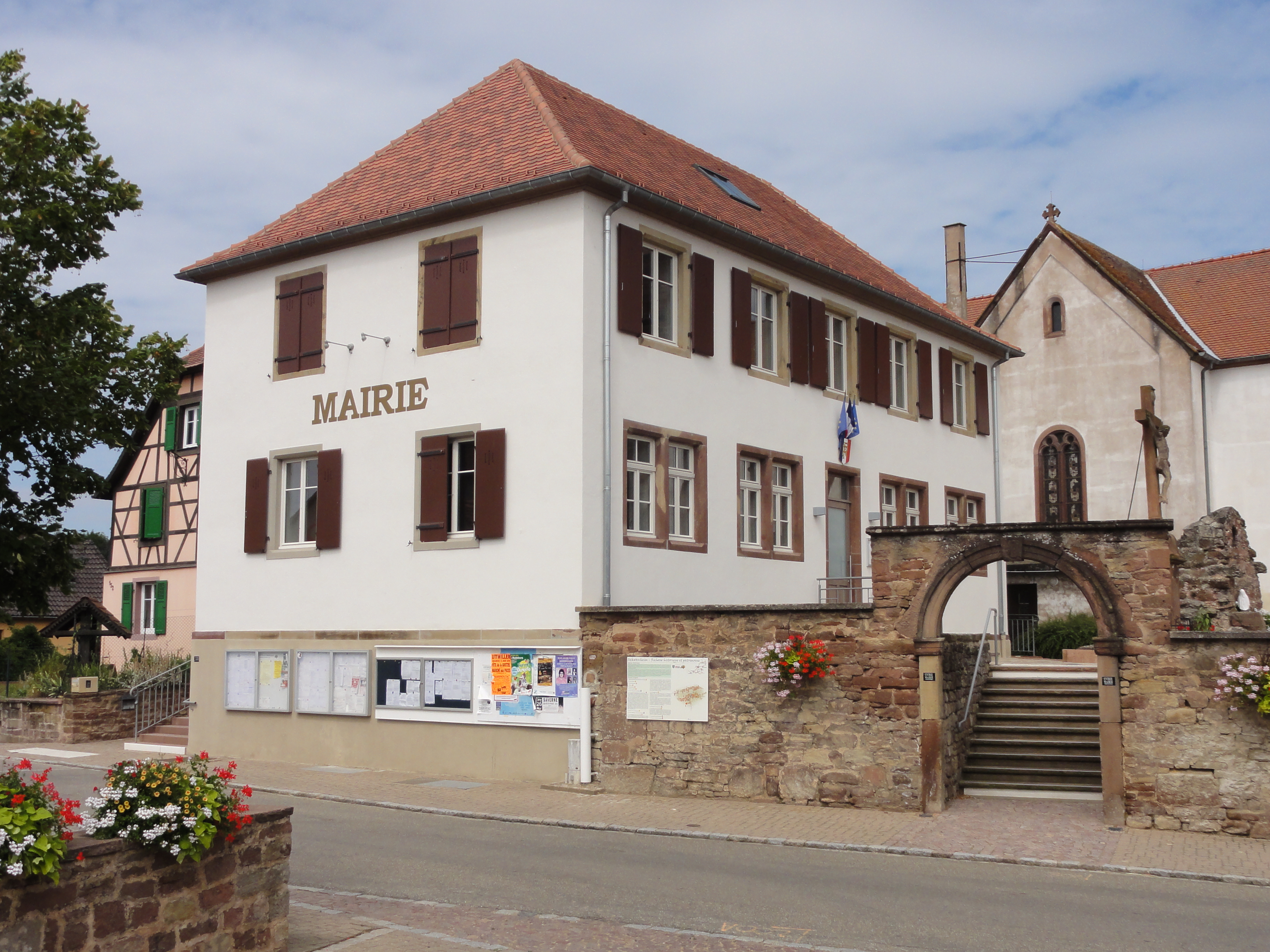
- The town hall in Schwenheim

- Coat of arms
- Location of Schwenheim
- Location within France Location within Grand Est
- Coordinates: 48°42′51″N 7°24′48″E
- Country: France
- Region: Grand Est
- Department: Bas-Rhin
- Arrondissement: Saverne
- Canton: Saverne

Government
  - Mayor (2020–2026): Gabriel Oelschlaeger
- Area^{1}: 4.96 km^{2} (1.92 sq mi)
- Highest elevation: 262 m (860 ft)
- Lowest elevation: 194 m (636 ft)
- Population (2023): 742
  - Density: 150/km^{2} (387/sq mi)
- Time zone: UTC+01:00 (CET)
  - Summer (DST): UTC+02:00 (CEST)
- INSEE/Postal code: 67459 /67440
- ^{1} French Land Register data, which excludes lakes, ponds, glaciers > 1 km^{2} (0.386 sq mi or 247 acres) and river estuaries.

Schwenheim (French pronunciation: [ʃvɛnaim]; German: Schweinheim; Alsatian: Schwäne) is a commune in the Bas-Rhin department in Grand Est in north-eastern France. The name of the commune was officially changed from Schweinheim to Schwenheim in July 1953.

== See also ==
- Communes of the Bas-Rhin department
