= Steinbourg =

- Commune
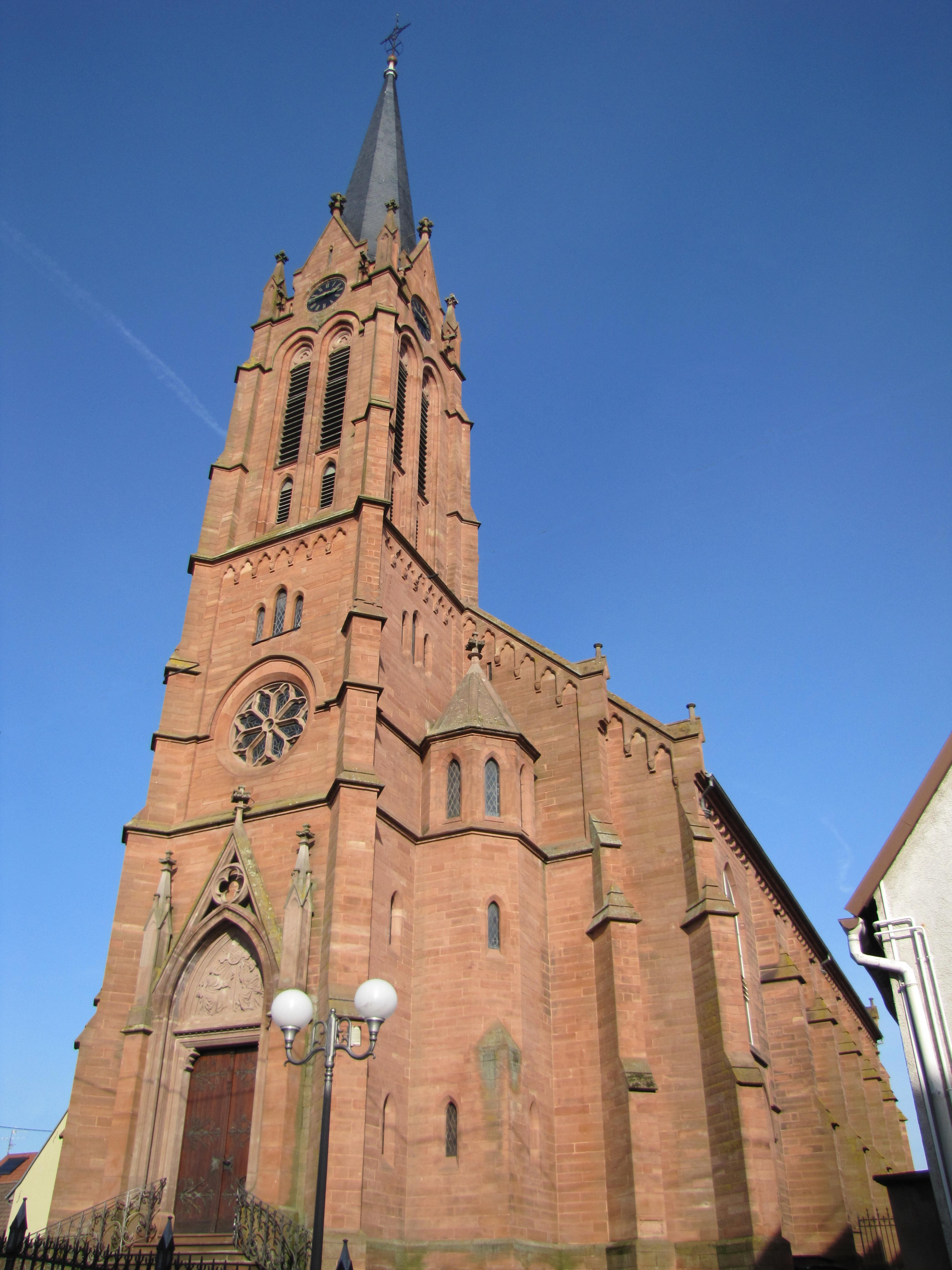
- The church in Steinbourg

- Coat of arms
- Location of Steinbourg
- Location within France Location within Grand Est
- Coordinates: 48°46′14″N 7°24′50″E
- Country: France
- Region: Grand Est
- Department: Bas-Rhin
- Arrondissement: Saverne
- Canton: Saverne
- Intercommunality: Pays de Saverne

Government
  - Mayor (2020–2026): Viviane Kern
- Area^{1}: 12.73 km^{2} (4.92 sq mi)
- Highest elevation: 232 m (761 ft)
- Lowest elevation: 168 m (551 ft)
- Population (2023): 1,897
  - Density: 149.0/km^{2} (386.0/sq mi)
- Time zone: UTC+01:00 (CET)
  - Summer (DST): UTC+02:00 (CEST)
- INSEE/Postal code: 67478 /67790
- ^{1} French Land Register data, which excludes lakes, ponds, glaciers > 1 km^{2} (0.386 sq mi or 247 acres) and river estuaries.

Steinbourg (French: [ʃtajnbuʁ]; German: Steinburg) is a commune in the Bas-Rhin department and Grand Est region of north-eastern France.

== See also ==
- Communes of the Bas-Rhin department
