= Printzheim =

Printzheim Prínze
- Commune
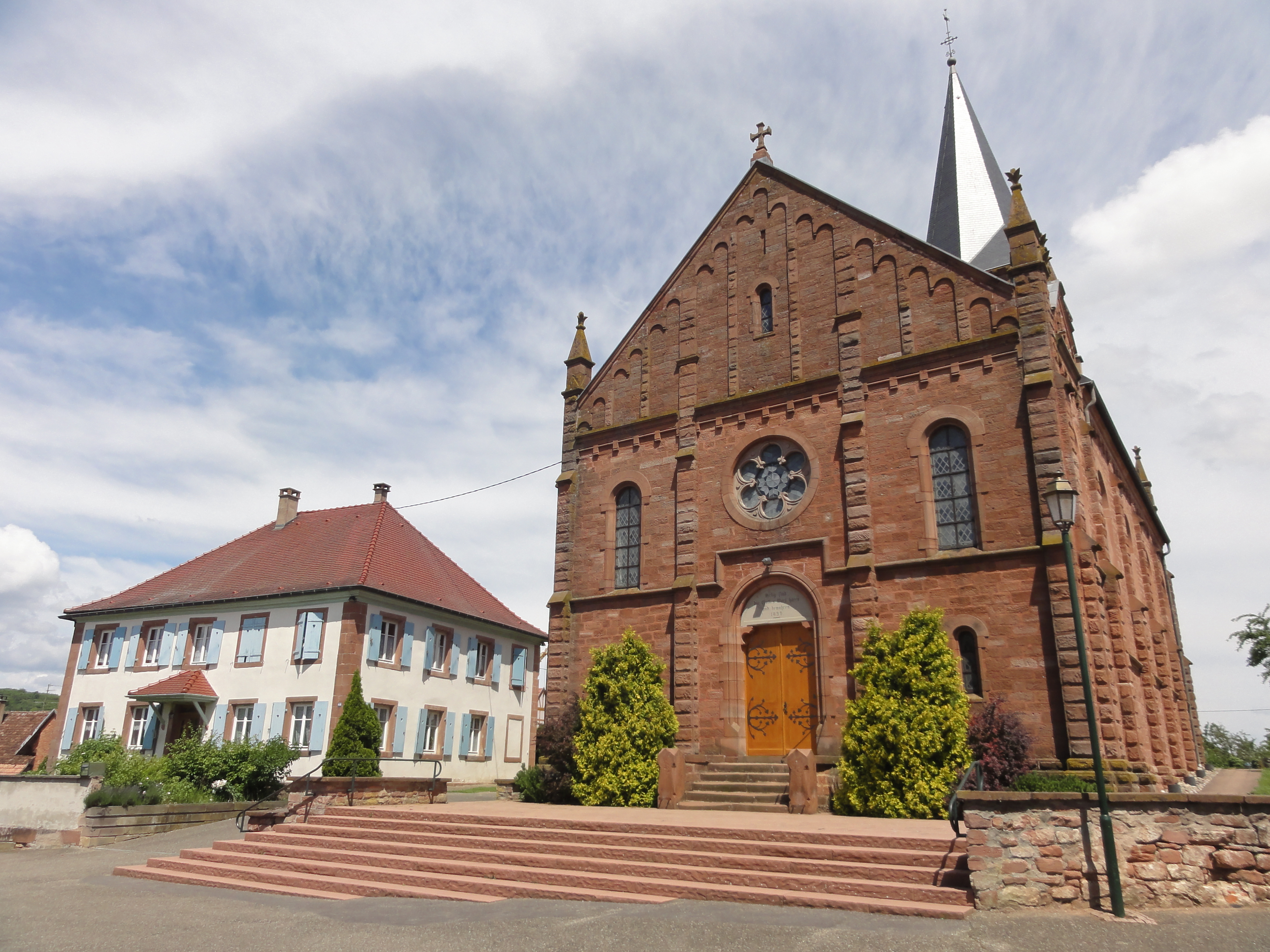
- The Protestant church in Printzheim

- Coat of arms
- Location of Printzheim
- Location within France Location within Grand Est
- Coordinates: 48°47′29″N 7°28′47″E
- Country: France
- Region: Grand Est
- Department: Bas-Rhin
- Arrondissement: Saverne
- Canton: Saverne

Government
  - Mayor (2020–2026): Michel Eichholtzer
- Area^{1}: 4.3 km^{2} (1.7 sq mi)
- Highest elevation: 283 m (928 ft)
- Lowest elevation: 197 m (646 ft)
- Population (2023): 209
  - Density: 49/km^{2} (130/sq mi)
- Time zone: UTC+01:00 (CET)
  - Summer (DST): UTC+02:00 (CEST)
- INSEE/Postal code: 67380 /67490
- ^{1} French Land Register data, which excludes lakes, ponds, glaciers > 1 km^{2} (0.386 sq mi or 247 acres) and river estuaries.

Printzheim (French pronunciation: [pʁintsaim]; German: Prinzheim; Alsatian: Prínze) is a commune in the Bas-Rhin department in Grand Est in north-eastern France.

== See also ==
- Communes of the Bas-Rhin department
