= Reutenbourg =

Reutenbourg Riteburi
- Commune
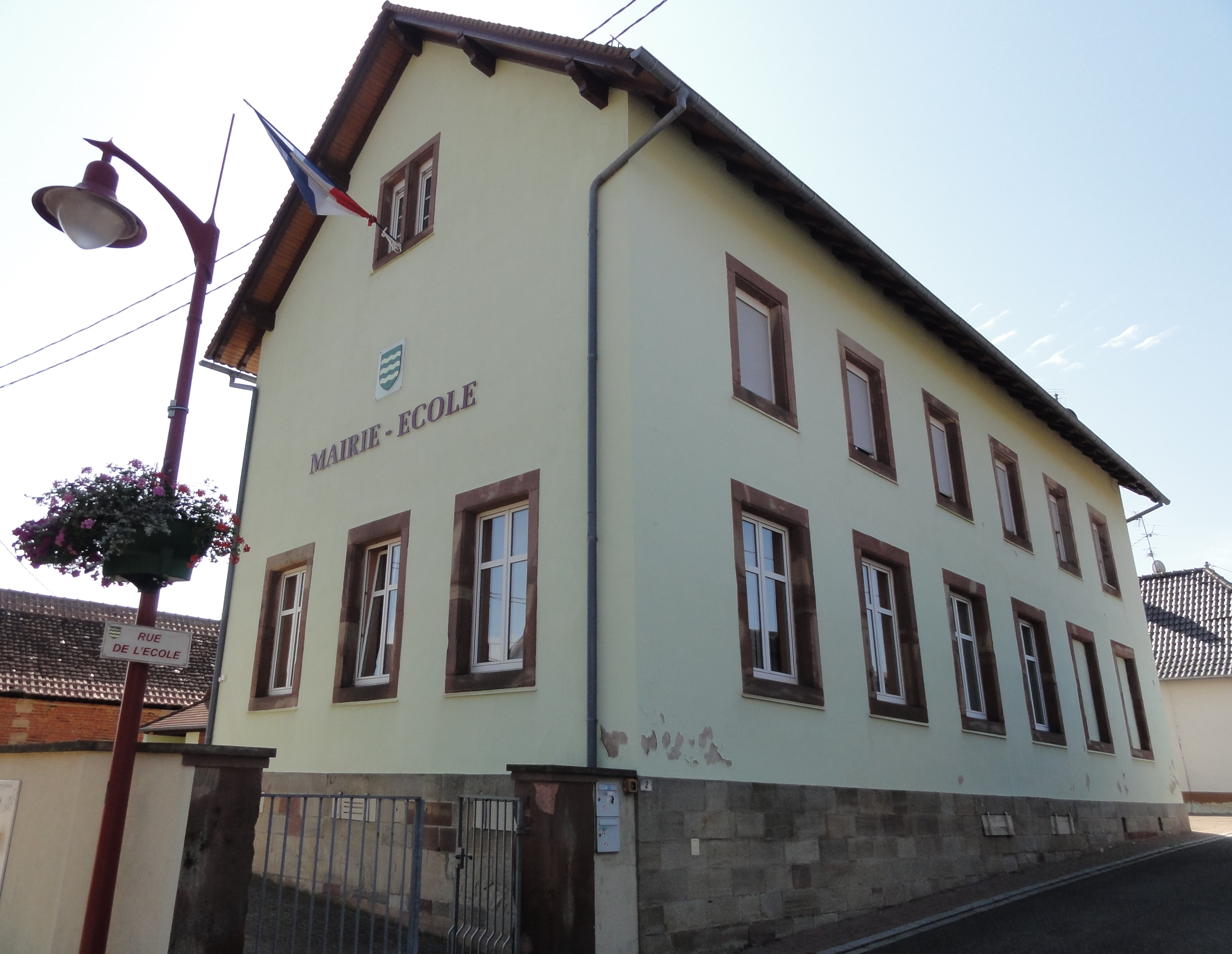
- The town hall in Reutenbourg

- Coat of arms
- Location of Reutenbourg
- Location within France Location within Grand Est
- Coordinates: 48°41′08″N 7°24′26″E
- Country: France
- Region: Grand Est
- Department: Bas-Rhin
- Arrondissement: Saverne
- Canton: Saverne
- Intercommunality: Pays de Saverne

Government
  - Mayor (2020–2026): Frédéric Georger
- Area^{1}: 4.4 km^{2} (1.7 sq mi)
- Highest elevation: 351 m (1,152 ft)
- Lowest elevation: 211 m (692 ft)
- Population (2023): 388
  - Density: 88/km^{2} (230/sq mi)
- Time zone: UTC+01:00 (CET)
  - Summer (DST): UTC+02:00 (CEST)
- INSEE/Postal code: 67395 /67440
- ^{1} French Land Register data, which excludes lakes, ponds, glaciers > 1 km^{2} (0.386 sq mi or 247 acres) and river estuaries.

Reutenbourg (German: Reutenburg) is a commune in the Bas-Rhin department and Grand Est region of north-eastern France.

== Population ==
Historical population
Year	Pop.	±% p.a.
1968	365	—
1975	355	−0.40%
1982	328	−1.12%
1990	318	−0.39%
1999	303	−0.54%
2007	343	+1.56%
2012	400	+3.12%
2017	419	+0.93%
2023	388	−1.27%
Source: INSEE

== See also ==
- Communes of the Bas-Rhin department
