= Lochwiller =

- Commune
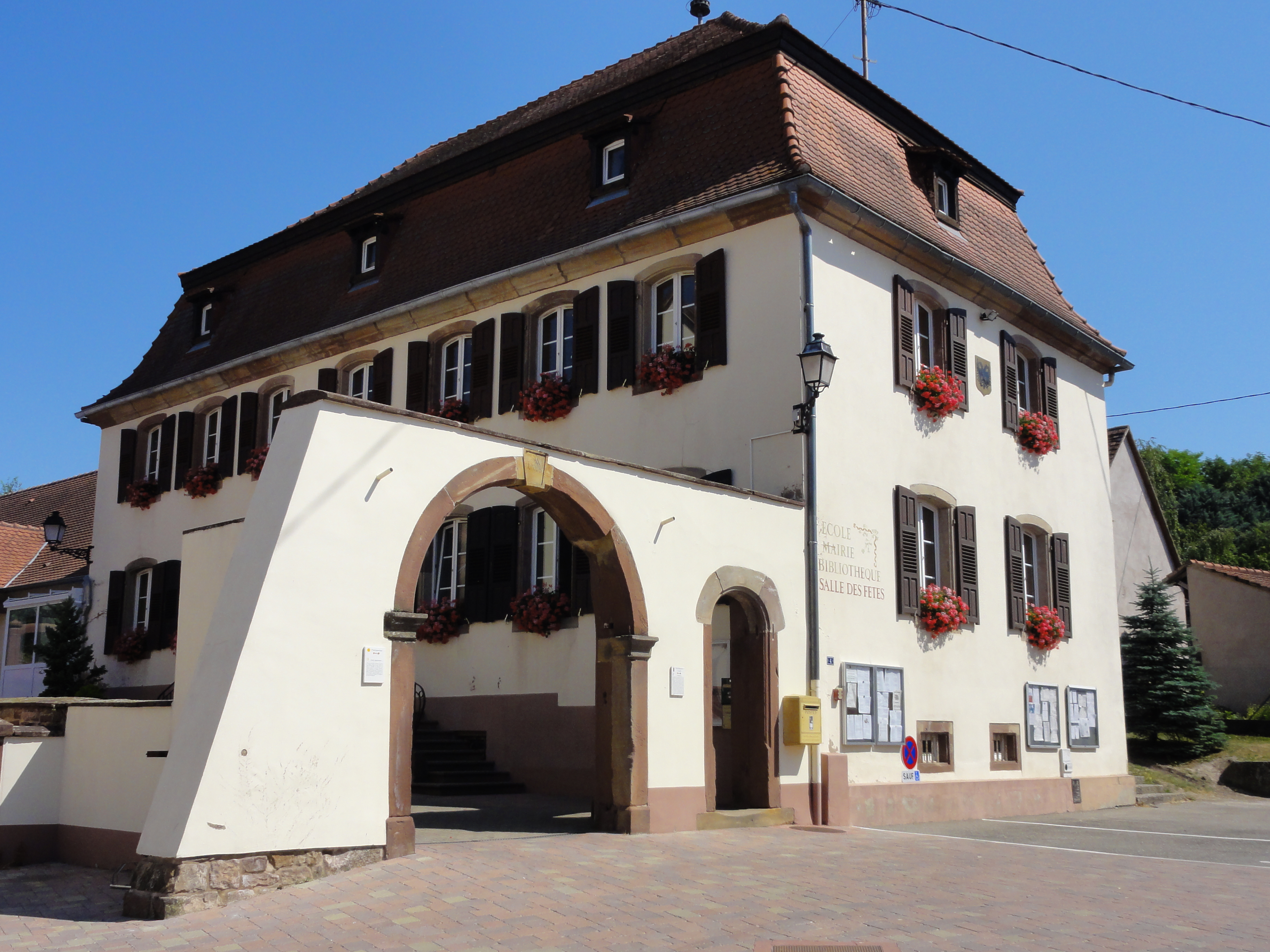
- The town hall in Lochwiller

- Coat of arms
- Location of Lochwiller
- Location within France Location within Grand Est
- Coordinates: 48°41′50″N 7°24′56″E
- Country: France
- Region: Grand Est
- Department: Bas-Rhin
- Arrondissement: Saverne
- Canton: Saverne

Government
  - Mayor (2020–2026): Christophe Kalck
- Area^{1}: 4.63 km^{2} (1.79 sq mi)
- Highest elevation: 271 m (889 ft)
- Lowest elevation: 200 m (660 ft)
- Population (2023): 371
  - Density: 80.1/km^{2} (208/sq mi)
- Time zone: UTC+01:00 (CET)
  - Summer (DST): UTC+02:00 (CEST)
- INSEE/Postal code: 67272 /67440
- ^{1} French Land Register data, which excludes lakes, ponds, glaciers > 1 km^{2} (0.386 sq mi or 247 acres) and river estuaries.

Lochwiller (German: Lochweiler) is a commune in the Bas-Rhin department in Grand Est in north-eastern France.

== See also ==
- Communes of the Bas-Rhin department
