= Saessolsheim =

- Commune
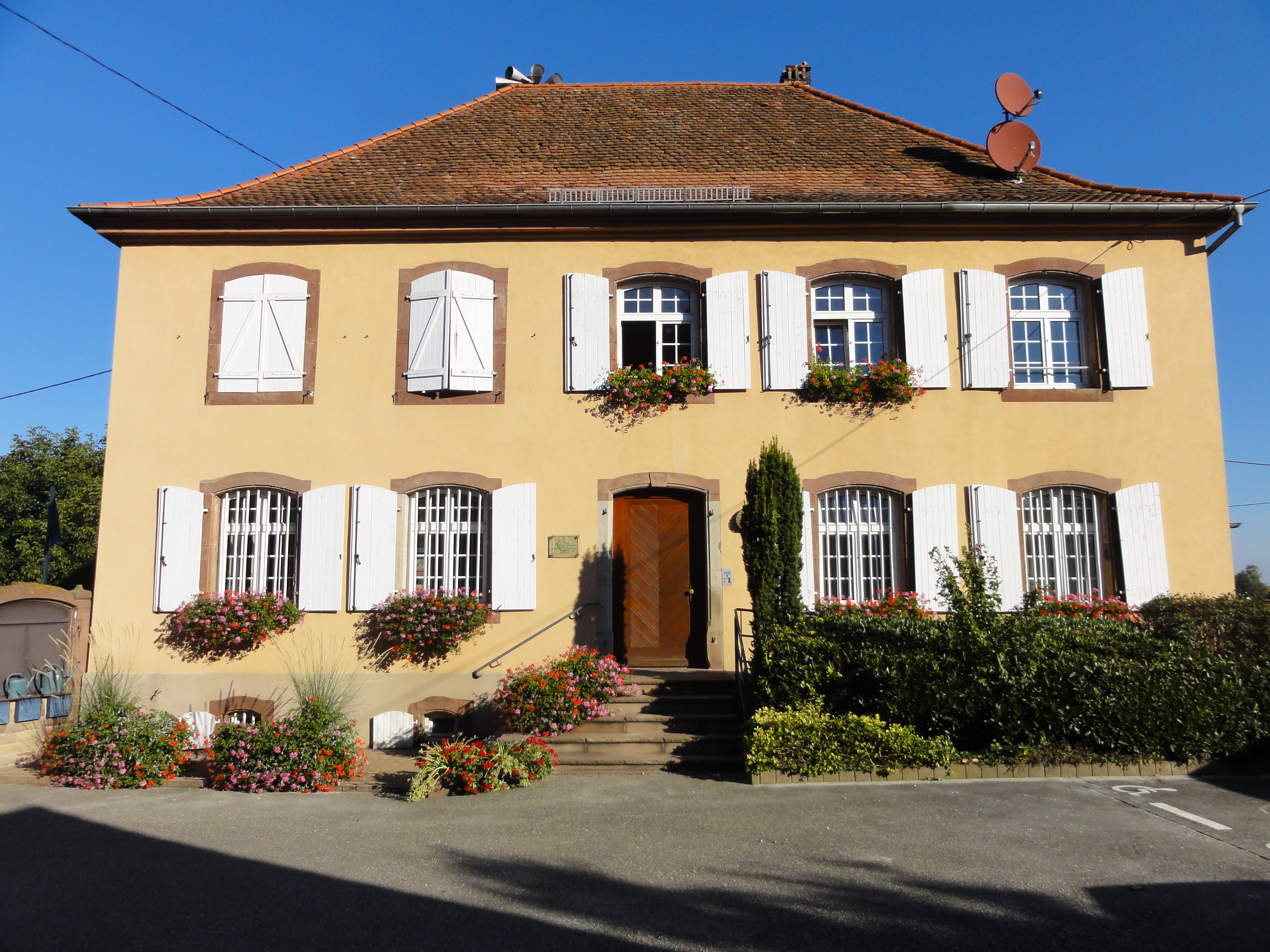
- The town hall in Saessolsheim

- Coat of arms
- Location of Saessolsheim
- Location within France Location within Grand Est
- Coordinates: 48°42′32″N 7°30′50″E
- Country: France
- Region: Grand Est
- Department: Bas-Rhin
- Arrondissement: Saverne
- Canton: Saverne
- Intercommunality: CC Pays de Saverne

Government
  - Mayor (2020–2026): Dominique Muller
- Area^{1}: 6.49 km^{2} (2.51 sq mi)
- Highest elevation: 259 m (850 ft)
- Lowest elevation: 172 m (564 ft)
- Population (2023): 604
  - Density: 93.1/km^{2} (241/sq mi)
- Time zone: UTC+01:00 (CET)
  - Summer (DST): UTC+02:00 (CEST)
- INSEE/Postal code: 67423 /67270
- ^{1} French Land Register data, which excludes lakes, ponds, glaciers > 1 km^{2} (0.386 sq mi or 247 acres) and river estuaries.

Saessolsheim (French pronunciation: [sɛsɔlsaim]; German: Sässolsheim) is a commune in the Bas-Rhin department in Grand Est in north-eastern France.

== See also ==
- Communes of the Bas-Rhin department
