= Wolschheim =

- Commune
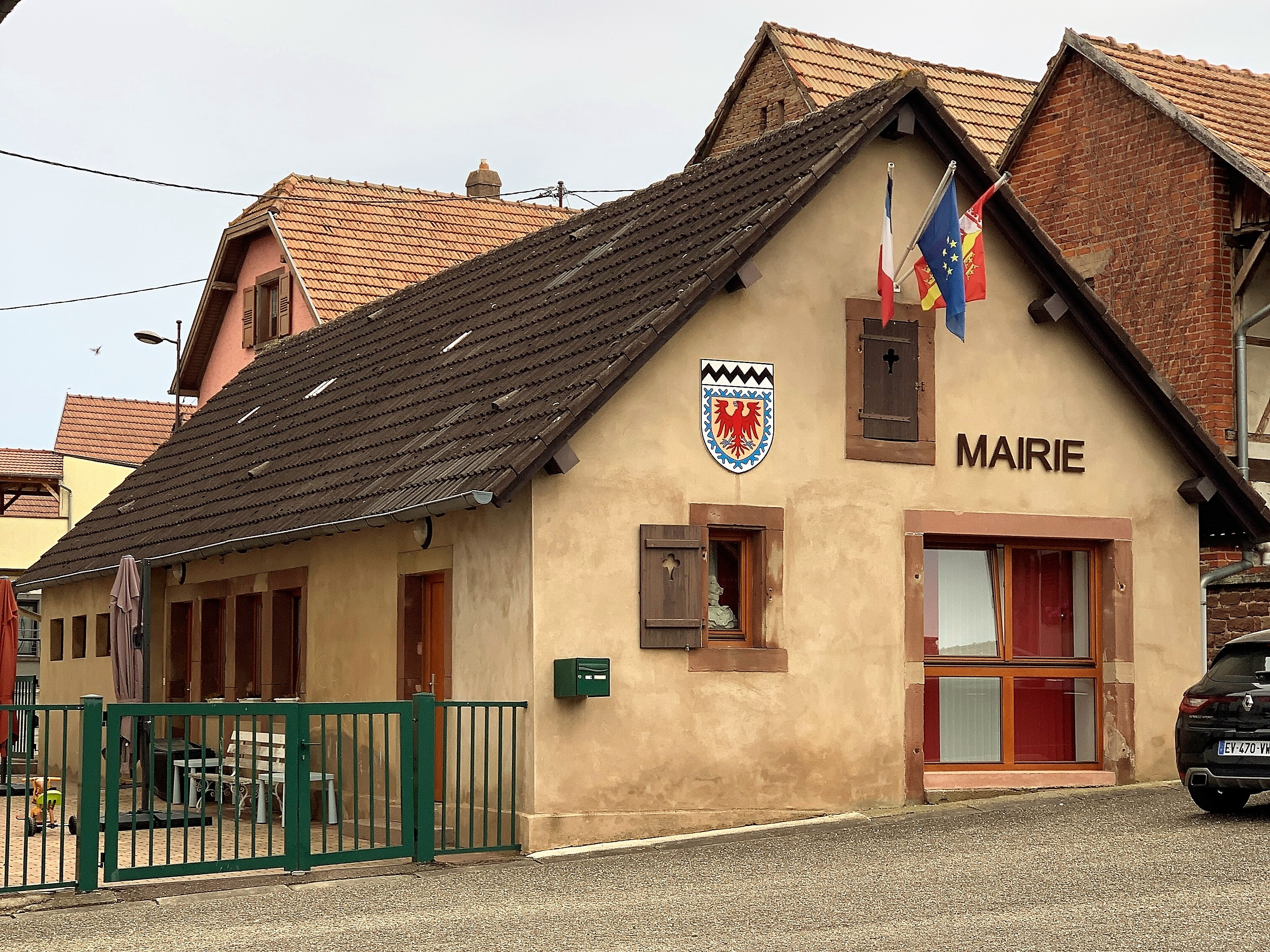
- Town hall

- Coat of arms
- Location of Wolschheim
- Location within France Location within Grand Est
- Coordinates: 48°42′14″N 7°27′03″E
- Country: France
- Region: Grand Est
- Department: Bas-Rhin
- Arrondissement: Saverne
- Canton: Saverne
- Intercommunality: Pays de Saverne

Government
  - Mayor (2020–2026): Jean-Marc Gitz
- Area^{1}: 3.65 km^{2} (1.41 sq mi)
- Elevation: 225 m (738 ft)
- Highest elevation: 268 m (879 ft)
- Lowest elevation: 202 m (663 ft)
- Population (2023): 311
  - Density: 85.2/km^{2} (221/sq mi)
- Time zone: UTC+01:00 (CET)
  - Summer (DST): UTC+02:00 (CEST)
- INSEE/Postal code: 67553 /67700
- ^{1} French Land Register data, which excludes lakes, ponds, glaciers > 1 km^{2} (0.386 sq mi or 247 acres) and river estuaries.

Wolschheim (French pronunciation: [vɔlʃaim]; Alsatian: Wolsche) is a commune in the Bas-Rhin department in Grand Est in north-eastern France.

== Population ==
Historical population
Year	Pop.	±% p.a.
1968	239	—
1975	235	−0.24%
1982	247	+0.71%
1990	265	+0.88%
1999	296	+1.24%
2007	310	+0.58%
2012	311	+0.06%
2017	320	+0.57%
2023	311	−0.47%
Source: INSEE

== See also ==
- Communes of the Bas-Rhin department
