= Monswiller =

- Commune
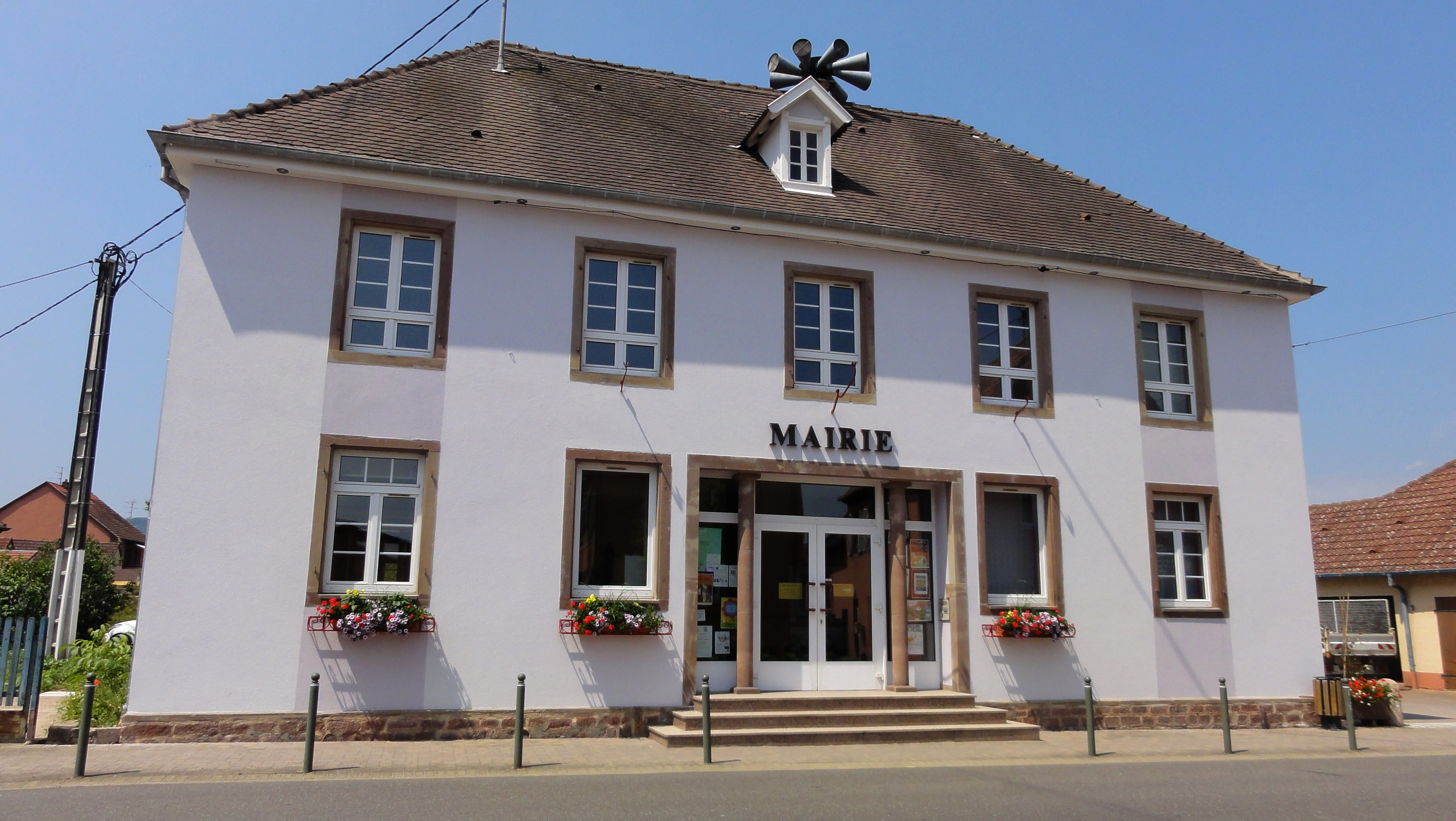
- The town hall in Monswiller

- Coat of arms
- Location of Monswiller
- Location within France Location within Grand Est
- Coordinates: 48°45′19″N 7°22′50″E
- Country: France
- Region: Grand Est
- Department: Bas-Rhin
- Arrondissement: Saverne
- Canton: Saverne
- Intercommunality: CC Pays de Saverne

Government
  - Mayor (2020–2026): William Picard
- Area^{1}: 4.72 km^{2} (1.82 sq mi)
- Highest elevation: 227 m (745 ft)
- Lowest elevation: 173 m (568 ft)
- Population (2023): 1,995
  - Density: 423/km^{2} (1,090/sq mi)
- Time zone: UTC+01:00 (CET)
  - Summer (DST): UTC+02:00 (CEST)
- INSEE/Postal code: 67302 /67700
- ^{1} French Land Register data, which excludes lakes, ponds, glaciers > 1 km^{2} (0.386 sq mi or 247 acres) and river estuaries.

Monswiller (German: Monsweiler) is a commune in the Bas-Rhin department in Grand Est in north-eastern France.

== Population ==
Historical population
Year	Pop.	±% p.a.
1968	1,506	—
1975	1,760	+2.25%
1982	1,779	+0.15%
1990	1,757	−0.16%
1999	1,800	+0.27%
2007	2,110	+2.01%
2012	2,118	+0.08%
2017	2,077	−0.39%
2023	1,995	−0.67%
Source: INSEE

== See also ==
- Communes of the Bas-Rhin department
