= Bouxwiller, Haut-Rhin =

Commune in Grand Est, France

Bouxwiller
- Commune
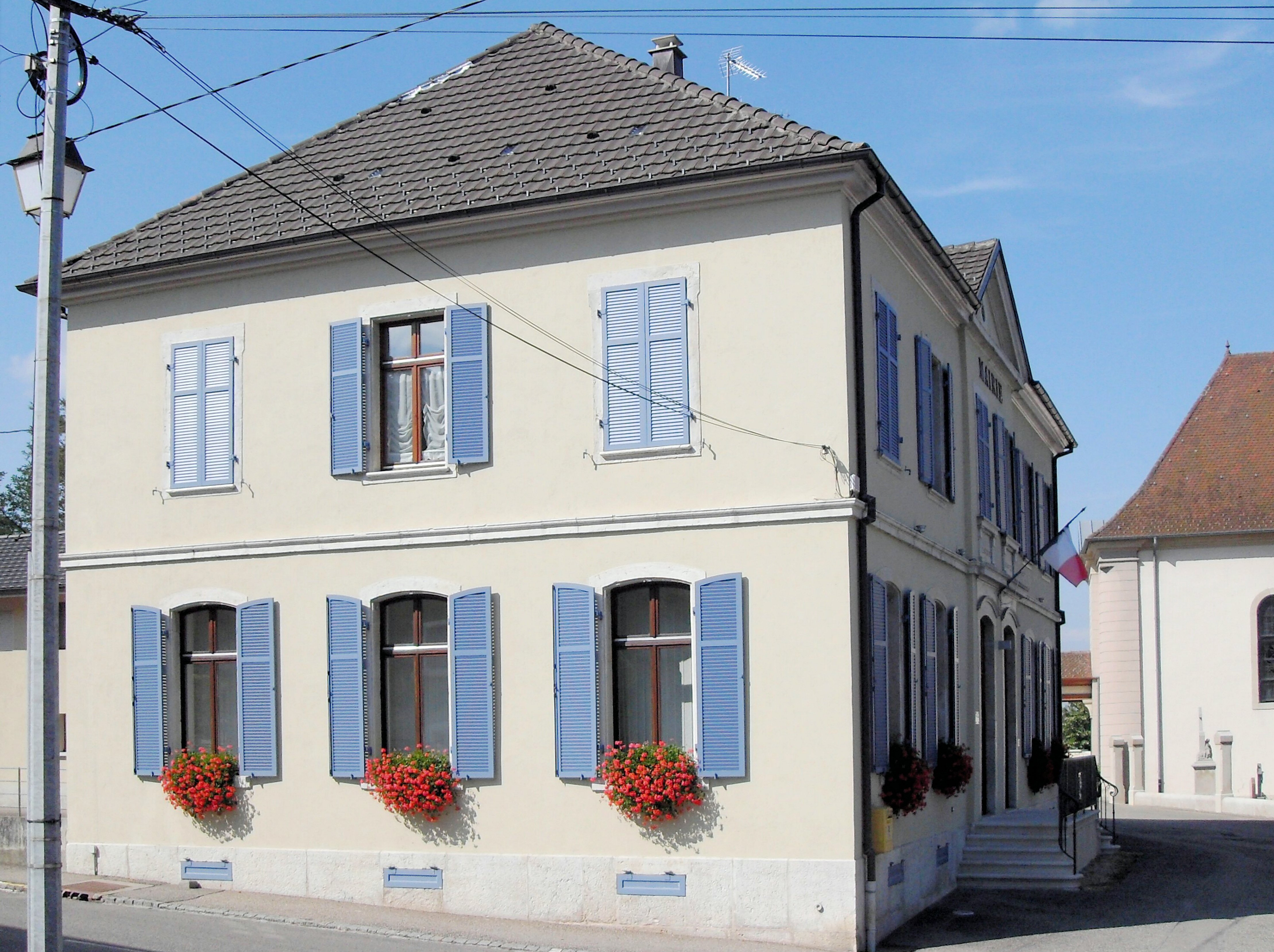
- The town hall in Bouxwiller

- Coat of arms
- Location of Bouxwiller
- Location within France Location within Grand Est
- Coordinates: 47°30′20″N 7°20′47″E
- Country: France
- Region: Grand Est
- Department: Haut-Rhin
- Arrondissement: Altkirch
- Canton: Altkirch

Government
  - Mayor (2020–2026): Jean-Luc Heudecker
- Area^{1}: 6.47 km^{2} (2.50 sq mi)
- Elevation: 395 m (1,296 ft)
- Highest elevation: 639 m (2,096 ft)
- Lowest elevation: 375 m (1,230 ft)
- Population (2023): 424
  - Density: 65.5/km^{2} (170/sq mi)
- Time zone: UTC+01:00 (CET)
  - Summer (DST): UTC+02:00 (CEST)
- INSEE/Postal code: 68049 /68480
- ^{1} French Land Register data, which excludes lakes, ponds, glaciers > 1 km^{2} (0.386 sq mi or 247 acres) and river estuaries.

Bouxwiller (French pronunciation: [buksvilɛʁ]; German: Buchsweiler; Alemannic German: Buxwiller, or Busswiller) is a commune in the Haut-Rhin department, Alsace, Grand Est, France.

== Toponymy ==
Puxuvilare is the earliest spelling of the town, as mentioned in 724. In 737, Buxwilari and Buxovillare were used. Eventually, Buchsweiler became the standard German spelling. The spelling of the town is Busswiller in Alsatian.

The current spelling of the town's name dates to the French Revolution. In 1792, the German spelling Buchsweiler—sometimes seen as Bouxweiler—was officially replaced with its French equivalent Bouxwiller, then Bouxviller in 1793. During the German annexation of Alsace from 1871 to 1918 and German annexation between 1940 and 1944, the town reverted to its German spelling Buchsweiler.

The name of the town is composed of two elements: Boux- and -willer. The suffix -willer is the French spelling of the German -weiler, which derives from the Medieval Old High German suffix -willer, which in turn is derived from the Low Latin word villare and means "agricultural land". The first element of the name, Boux-, is likely representative of the Germanic name Bucco, as toponyms incorporating the suffix -willer was typically combined with a personal name as the first element. The letter 'X' represents the letters 'ks', of which the 's' is the Saxon genitive that frequently appeared in toponyms in the region in the late Middle Ages. (Note: Other nearby towns incorporating the Saxon genitive include Erckartswiller, Monswiller, Eckartswiller, and Weiterswiller.) Thus, a probable meaning of the town's name is "Bucco's land". An alternative folk etymology of the town name is that the name is a combination of Buchs-, the German word for Buxus (boxwood), and -willer, thus meaning "land of boxwood". However, this origin is improbable considering the use of Puxuvilare in 724, since the Latin suffix -villare was not associated with vegetation.

== See also ==
- Communes of the Haut-Rhin department
