= Crastatt =

Crastatt Gràscht
- Commune
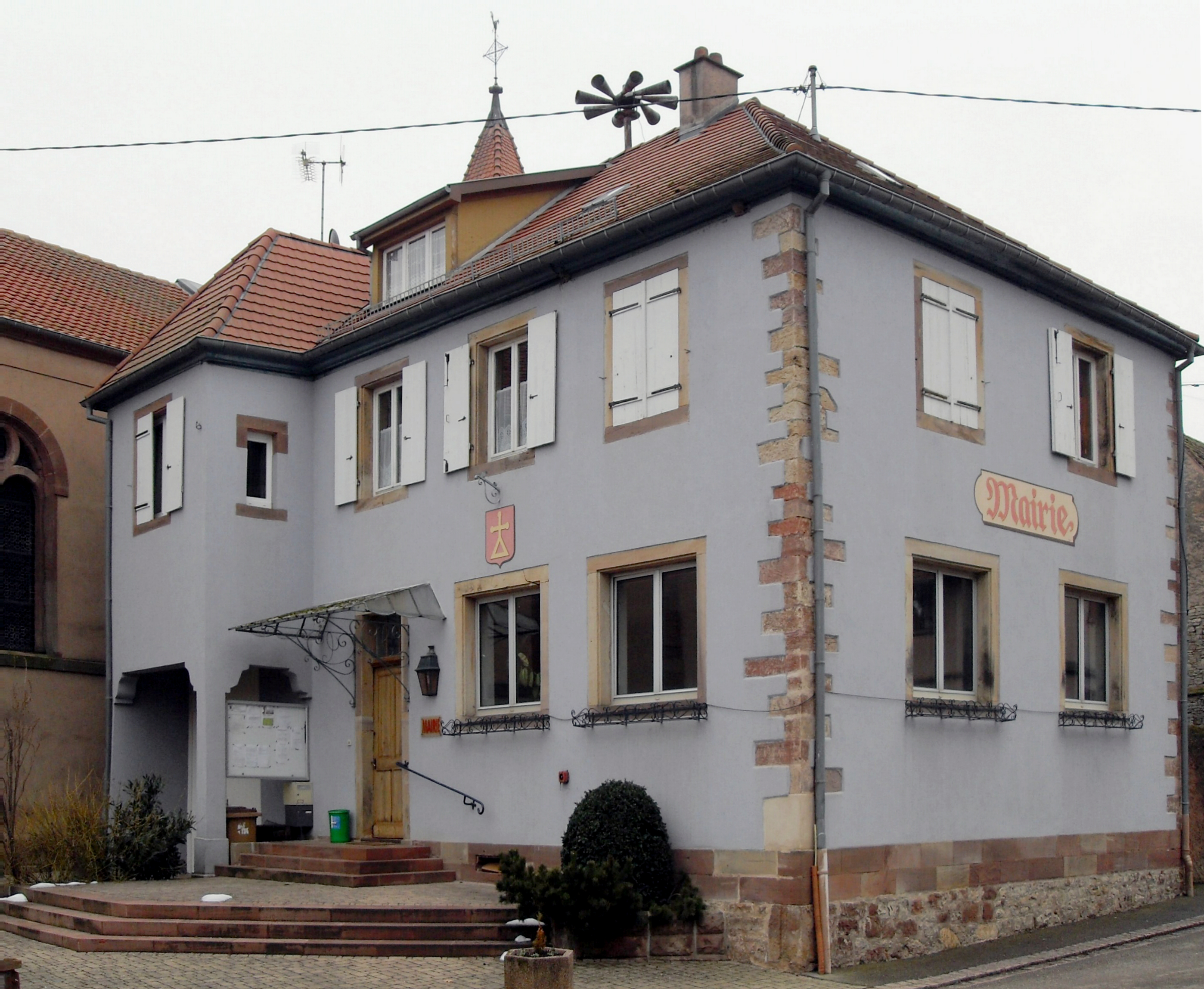
- The town hall in Crastatt

- Coat of arms
- Location of Crastatt
- Location within France Location within Grand Est
- Coordinates: 48°39′34″N 7°25′41″E
- Country: France
- Region: Grand Est
- Department: Bas-Rhin
- Arrondissement: Molsheim
- Canton: Saverne

Government
  - Mayor (2020–2026): Martine Kuntz-Sarlat
- Area^{1}: 3.39 km^{2} (1.31 sq mi)
- Highest elevation: 316 m (1,037 ft)
- Lowest elevation: 227 m (745 ft)
- Population (2023): 297
  - Density: 87.6/km^{2} (227/sq mi)
- Time zone: UTC+01:00 (CET)
  - Summer (DST): UTC+02:00 (CEST)
- INSEE/Postal code: 67078 /67310
- ^{1} French Land Register data, which excludes lakes, ponds, glaciers > 1 km^{2} (0.386 sq mi or 247 acres) and river estuaries.

Crastatt (German: Krastatt) is a commune in the Bas-Rhin department in Grand Est in north-eastern France.

== See also ==
- Communes of the Bas-Rhin department
