= Zeinheim =

- Commune
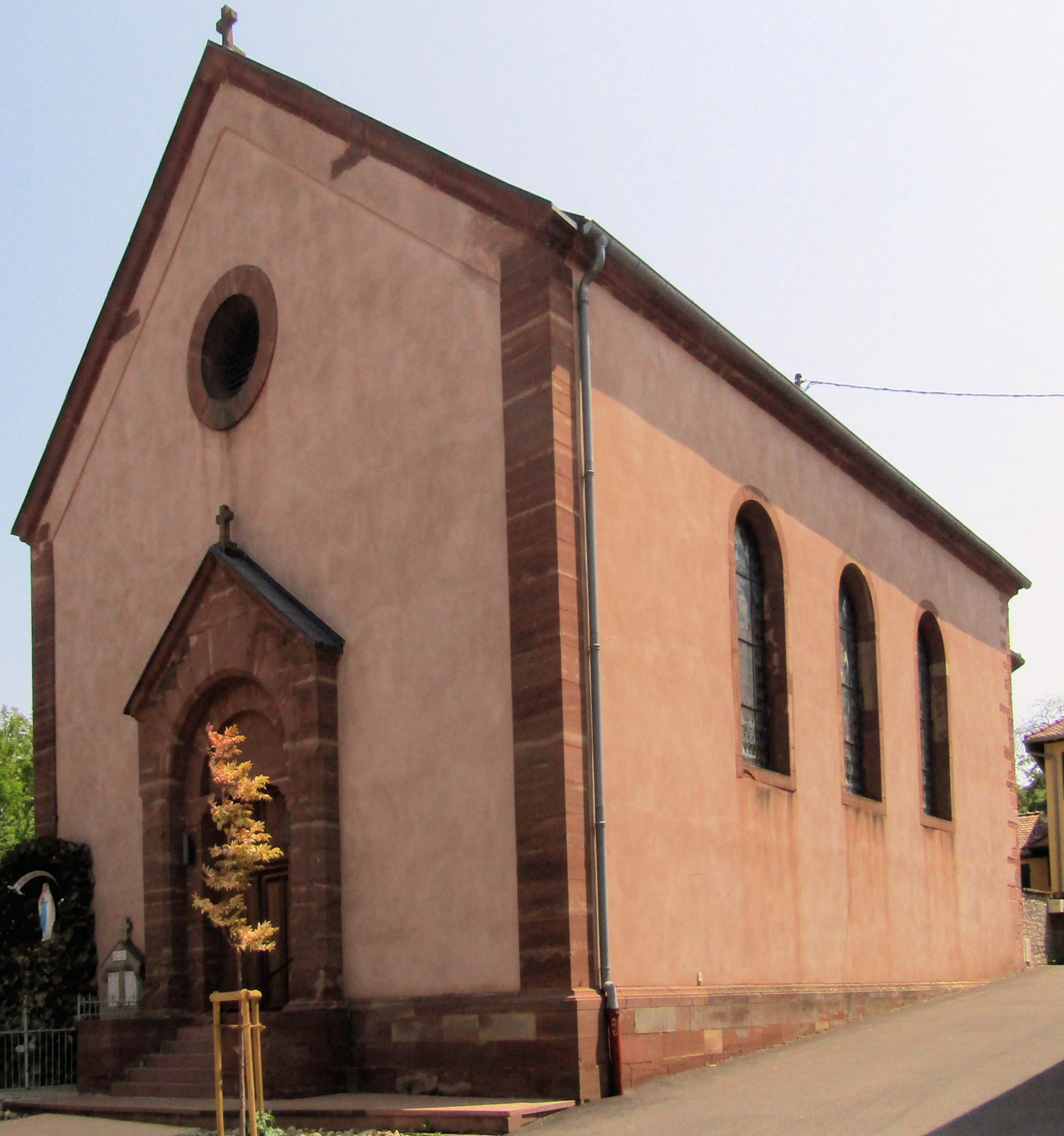
- The church in Zeinheim

- Coat of arms
- Location of Zeinheim
- Location within France Location within Grand Est
- Coordinates: 48°40′24″N 7°29′11″E
- Country: France
- Region: Grand Est
- Department: Bas-Rhin
- Arrondissement: Molsheim
- Canton: Saverne
- Intercommunality: Mossig et Vignoble

Government
  - Mayor (2020–2026): François Goetz
- Area^{1}: 2.46 km^{2} (0.95 sq mi)
- Elevation: 220 m (720 ft)
- Highest elevation: 268 m (879 ft)
- Lowest elevation: 195 m (640 ft)
- Population (2023): 234
  - Density: 95.1/km^{2} (246/sq mi)
- Demonym(s): Zeinheimois, Zeinheimoises
- Time zone: UTC+01:00 (CET)
  - Summer (DST): UTC+02:00 (CEST)
- INSEE/Postal code: 67556 /67310
- ^{1} French Land Register data, which excludes lakes, ponds, glaciers > 1 km^{2} (0.386 sq mi or 247 acres) and river estuaries.

Zeinheim is a commune in the Bas-Rhin department in Grand Est in north-eastern France.

== Population ==
Historical population

Year	Pop.	±% p.a.
1793	97	—
1821	198	+2.58%
1846	172	−0.56%
1871	188	+0.36%
1900	173	−0.29%
1926	161	−0.28%
1946	145	−0.52%
1962	122	−1.07%
1968	145	+2.92%

Year	Pop.	±% p.a.
1975	127	−1.88%
1982	114	−1.53%
1990	149	+3.40%
1999	151	+0.15%
2007	186	+2.64%
2012	203	+1.76%
2017	201	−0.20%
2023	234	+2.57%

Source: EHESS (1793-1999) and INSEE

== See also ==
- Communes of the Bas-Rhin department
