= Rangen =

Rangen Rànge
- Commune
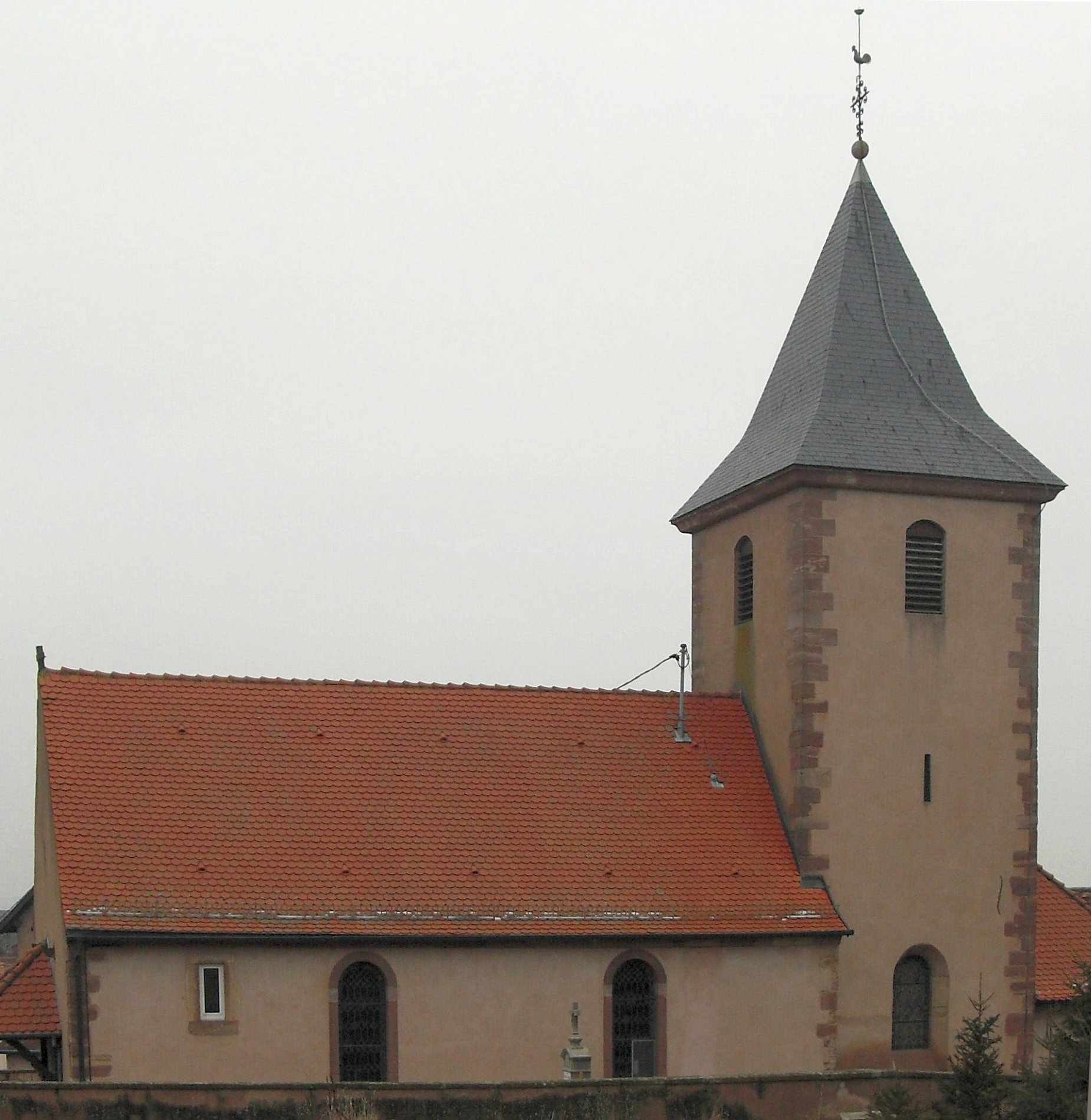
- The church in Rangen

- Coat of arms
- Location of Rangen
- Location within France Location within Grand Est
- Coordinates: 48°39′59″N 7°28′40″E
- Country: France
- Region: Grand Est
- Department: Bas-Rhin
- Arrondissement: Molsheim
- Canton: Saverne

Government
  - Mayor (2020–2026): Léon Heitmann
- Area^{1}: 1.65 km^{2} (0.64 sq mi)
- Highest elevation: 282 m (925 ft)
- Lowest elevation: 198 m (650 ft)
- Population (2023): 217
  - Density: 132/km^{2} (341/sq mi)
- Time zone: UTC+01:00 (CET)
  - Summer (DST): UTC+02:00 (CEST)
- INSEE/Postal code: 67383 /67310
- ^{1} French Land Register data, which excludes lakes, ponds, glaciers > 1 km^{2} (0.386 sq mi or 247 acres) and river estuaries.

Rangen is a commune in the Bas-Rhin department in Grand Est in north-eastern France.

== See also ==
- Communes of the Bas-Rhin department
