= Maennolsheim =

Maennolsheim Mannelse
- Commune
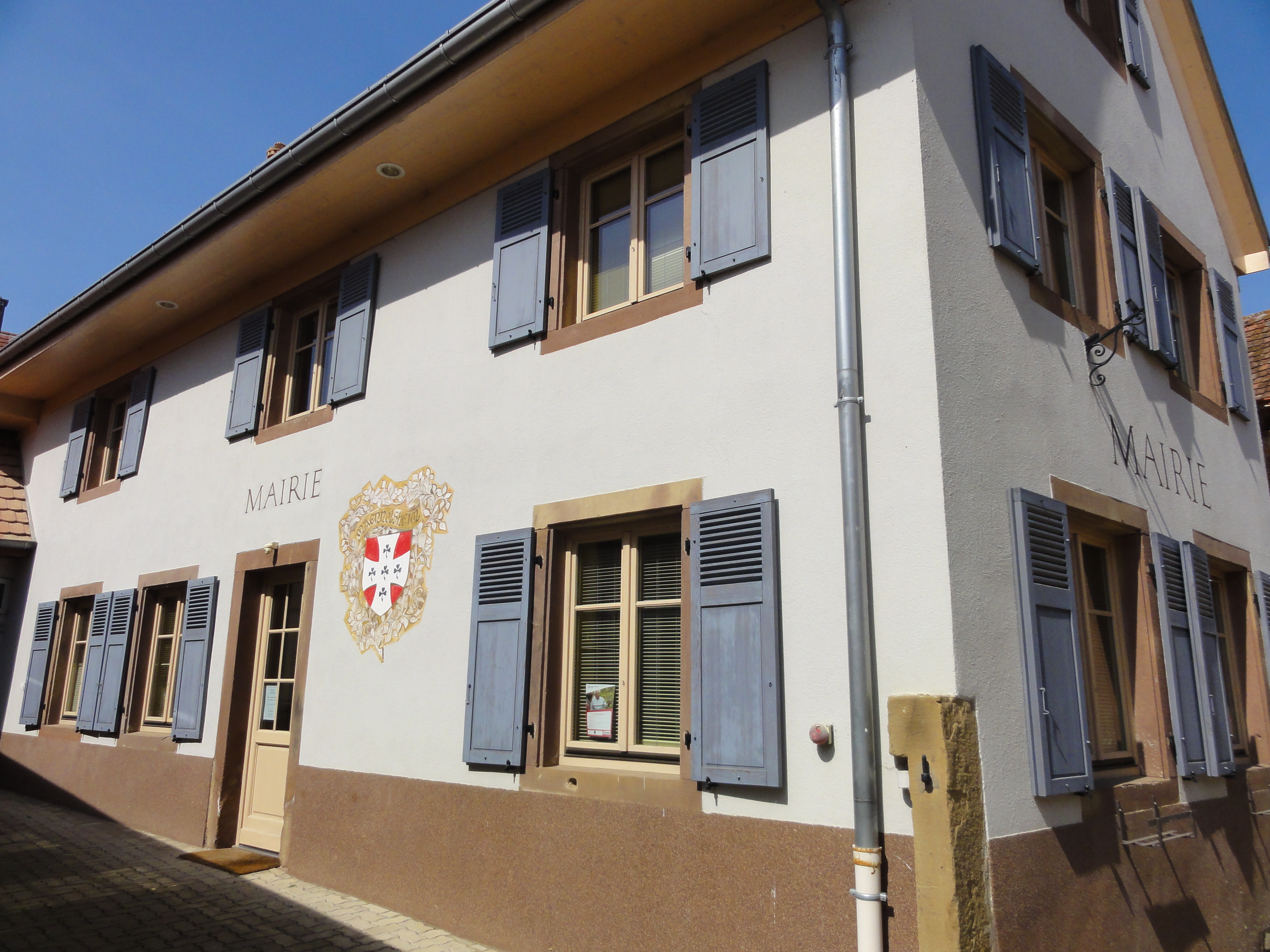
- The town hall in Maennolsheim

- Coat of arms
- Location of Maennolsheim
- Location within France Location within Grand Est
- Coordinates: 48°42′01″N 7°27′48″E
- Country: France
- Region: Grand Est
- Department: Bas-Rhin
- Arrondissement: Saverne
- Canton: Saverne
- Intercommunality: CC Pays de Saverne

Government
  - Mayor (2020–2026): Anny Kuhn
- Area^{1}: 2.74 km^{2} (1.06 sq mi)
- Highest elevation: 243 m (797 ft)
- Lowest elevation: 198 m (650 ft)
- Population (2023): 237
  - Density: 86.5/km^{2} (224/sq mi)
- Time zone: UTC+01:00 (CET)
  - Summer (DST): UTC+02:00 (CEST)
- INSEE/Postal code: 67279 /67700
- ^{1} French Land Register data, which excludes lakes, ponds, glaciers > 1 km^{2} (0.386 sq mi or 247 acres) and river estuaries.

Maennolsheim (French pronunciation: [mɛnɔlsaim]; German: Männolsheim) is a commune in the Bas-Rhin department in Grand Est in north-eastern France.

== See also ==
- Communes of the Bas-Rhin department
