= Zehnacker =

- Commune
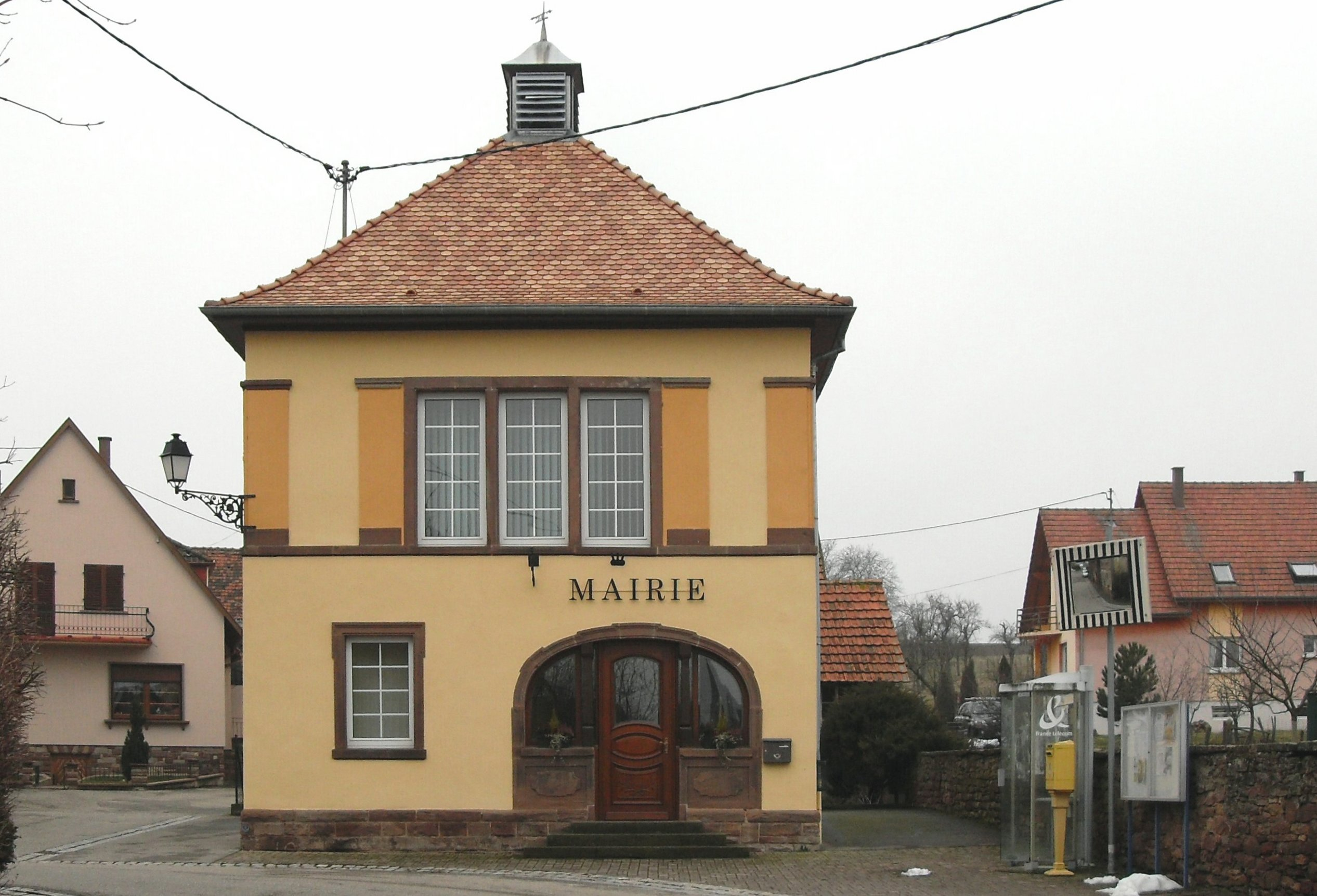
- The town hall in Zehnacker

- Coat of arms
- Location of Zehnacker
- Location within France Location within Grand Est
- Coordinates: 48°40′16″N 7°27′07″E
- Country: France
- Region: Grand Est
- Department: Bas-Rhin
- Arrondissement: Molsheim
- Canton: Saverne
- Intercommunality: Mossig et Vignoble

Government
  - Mayor (2020–2026): Patrick Bastian
- Area^{1}: 2.18 km^{2} (0.84 sq mi)
- Highest elevation: 282 m (925 ft)
- Lowest elevation: 208 m (682 ft)
- Population (2023): 254
  - Density: 117/km^{2} (302/sq mi)
- Demonym(s): Zehnackerois, Zehnackeroises
- Time zone: UTC+01:00 (CET)
  - Summer (DST): UTC+02:00 (CEST)
- INSEE/Postal code: 67555 /67310
- ^{1} French Land Register data, which excludes lakes, ponds, glaciers > 1 km^{2} (0.386 sq mi or 247 acres) and river estuaries.

Zehnacker is a commune in the Bas-Rhin department in Grand Est in north-eastern France.

== Population ==
Historical population

Year	Pop.	±% p.a.
1793	178	—
1821	234	+0.98%
1846	253	+0.31%
1871	230	−0.38%
1900	245	+0.22%
1926	215	−0.50%
1946	158	−1.53%
1962	155	−0.12%
1968	166	+1.15%

Year	Pop.	±% p.a.
1975	159	−0.61%
1982	150	−0.83%
1990	128	−1.96%
1999	170	+3.20%
2007	241	+4.46%
2012	254	+1.06%
2017	246	−0.64%
2023	254	+0.53%

Source: EHESS (1793-1999) and INSEE

== See also ==
- Communes of the Bas-Rhin department
