= Westhouse-Marmoutier =

- Commune
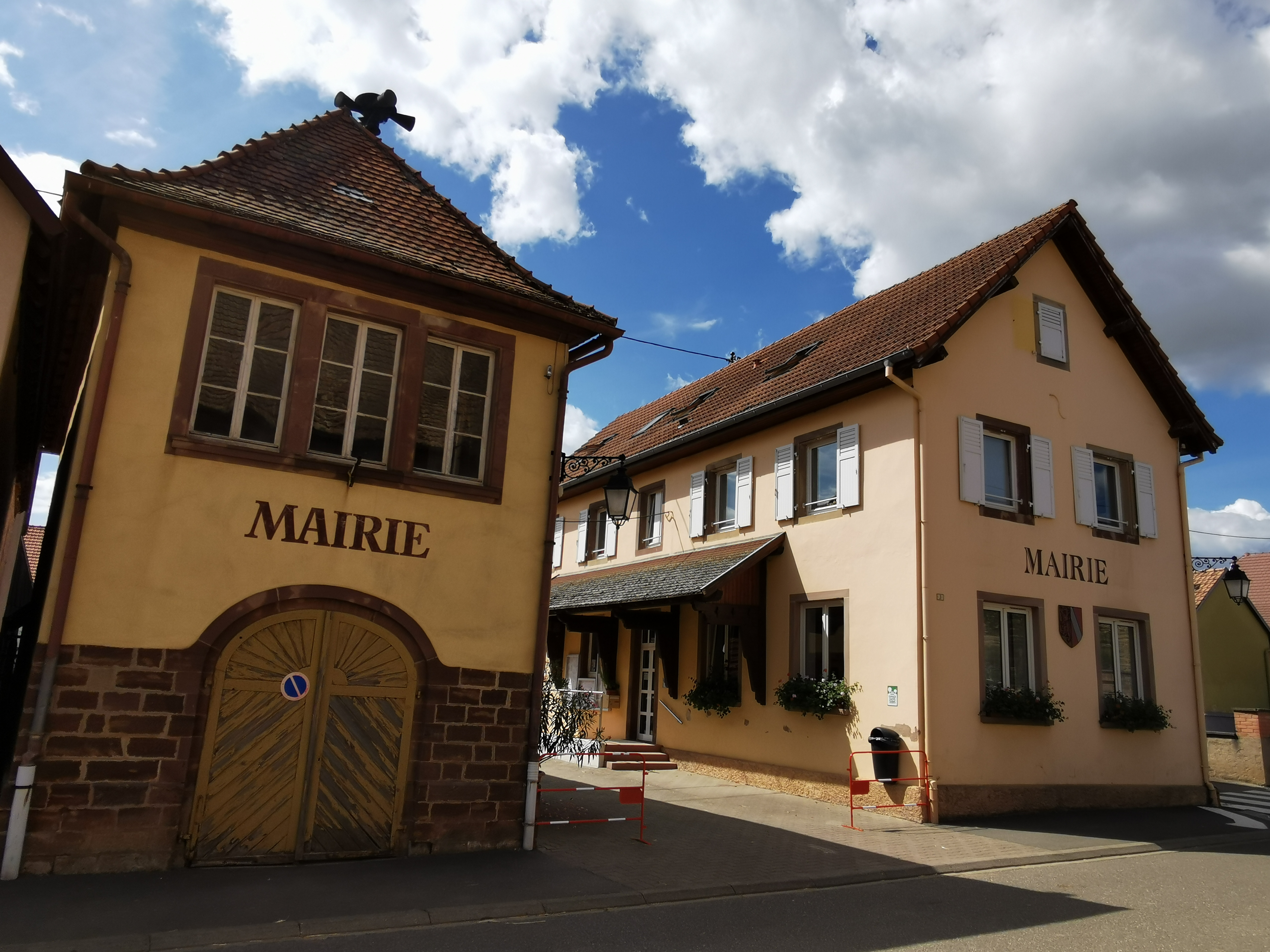
- Town hall

- Coat of arms
- Location of Westhouse-Marmoutier
- Location within France Location within Grand Est
- Coordinates: 48°41′10″N 7°27′01″E
- Country: France
- Region: Grand Est
- Department: Bas-Rhin
- Arrondissement: Saverne
- Canton: Saverne
- Intercommunality: Pays de Saverne

Government
  - Mayor (2020–2026): Jean-Claude Haettel
- Area^{1}: 3.96 km^{2} (1.53 sq mi)
- Highest elevation: 290 m (950 ft)
- Lowest elevation: 195 m (640 ft)
- Population (2023): 372
  - Density: 93.9/km^{2} (243/sq mi)
- Time zone: UTC+01:00 (CET)
  - Summer (DST): UTC+02:00 (CEST)
- INSEE/Postal code: 67527 /67440
- ^{1} French Land Register data, which excludes lakes, ponds, glaciers > 1 km^{2} (0.386 sq mi or 247 acres) and river estuaries.

Westhouse-Marmoutier (French pronunciation: [vɛstuz maʁmutje]; German: Westhausen; Alsatian: Weschthüse) is a commune in the Bas-Rhin department in Grand Est in north-eastern France.

== Population ==
Historical population
Year	Pop.	±% p.a.
1968	223	—
1975	216	−0.45%
1982	219	+0.20%
1990	223	+0.23%
1999	244	+1.00%
2007	250	+0.30%
2012	255	+0.40%
2017	306	+3.71%
2023	372	+3.31%
Source: INSEE

== See also ==
- Communes of the Bas-Rhin department
