= Domfessel =

- Commune
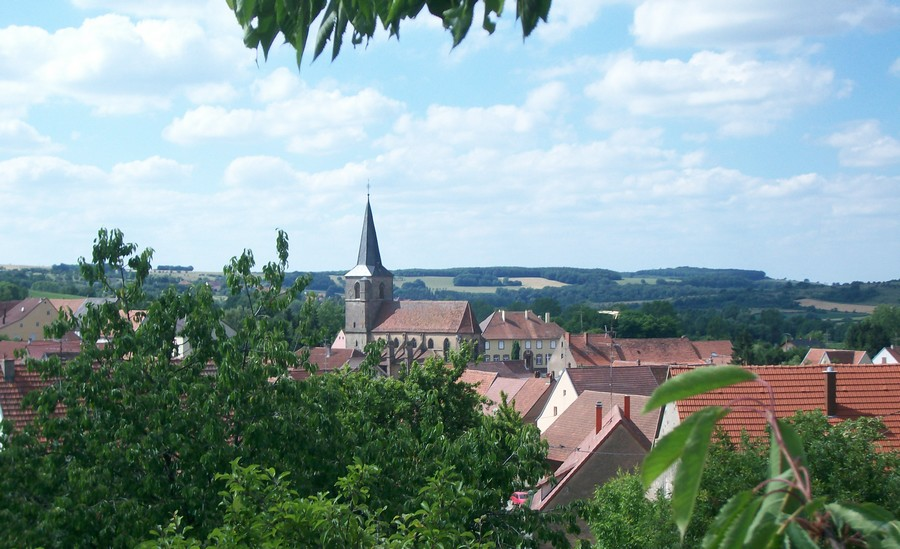
- A general view of Domfessel

- Coat of arms
- Location of Domfessel
- Location within France Location within Grand Est
- Coordinates: 48°57′06″N 7°09′15″E
- Country: France
- Region: Grand Est
- Department: Bas-Rhin
- Arrondissement: Saverne
- Canton: Ingwiller

Government
  - Mayor (2020–2026): Charles Kuchly
- Area^{1}: 6.23 km^{2} (2.41 sq mi)
- Highest elevation: 343 m (1,125 ft)
- Lowest elevation: 217 m (712 ft)
- Population (2023): 273
  - Density: 43.8/km^{2} (113/sq mi)
- Time zone: UTC+01:00 (CET)
  - Summer (DST): UTC+02:00 (CEST)
- INSEE/Postal code: 67099 /67430
- ^{1} French Land Register data, which excludes lakes, ponds, glaciers > 1 km^{2} (0.386 sq mi or 247 acres) and river estuaries.

Domfessel is a commune in the Bas-Rhin department in Grand Est in north-eastern France. As with other parts of Alsace and Bas-Rhin, Domfessel has had periods under German rule, and its name is Germanic. Domfessel has been part of France since 1790, with an interlude of German rule 1871–1919.

== See also ==
- Communes of the Bas-Rhin department
- Église fortifiée de Domfessel
