= Église fortifiée de Domfessel =

Church in Bas-Rhin, France

Coordinates: 48°57′06″N 7°9′8″E

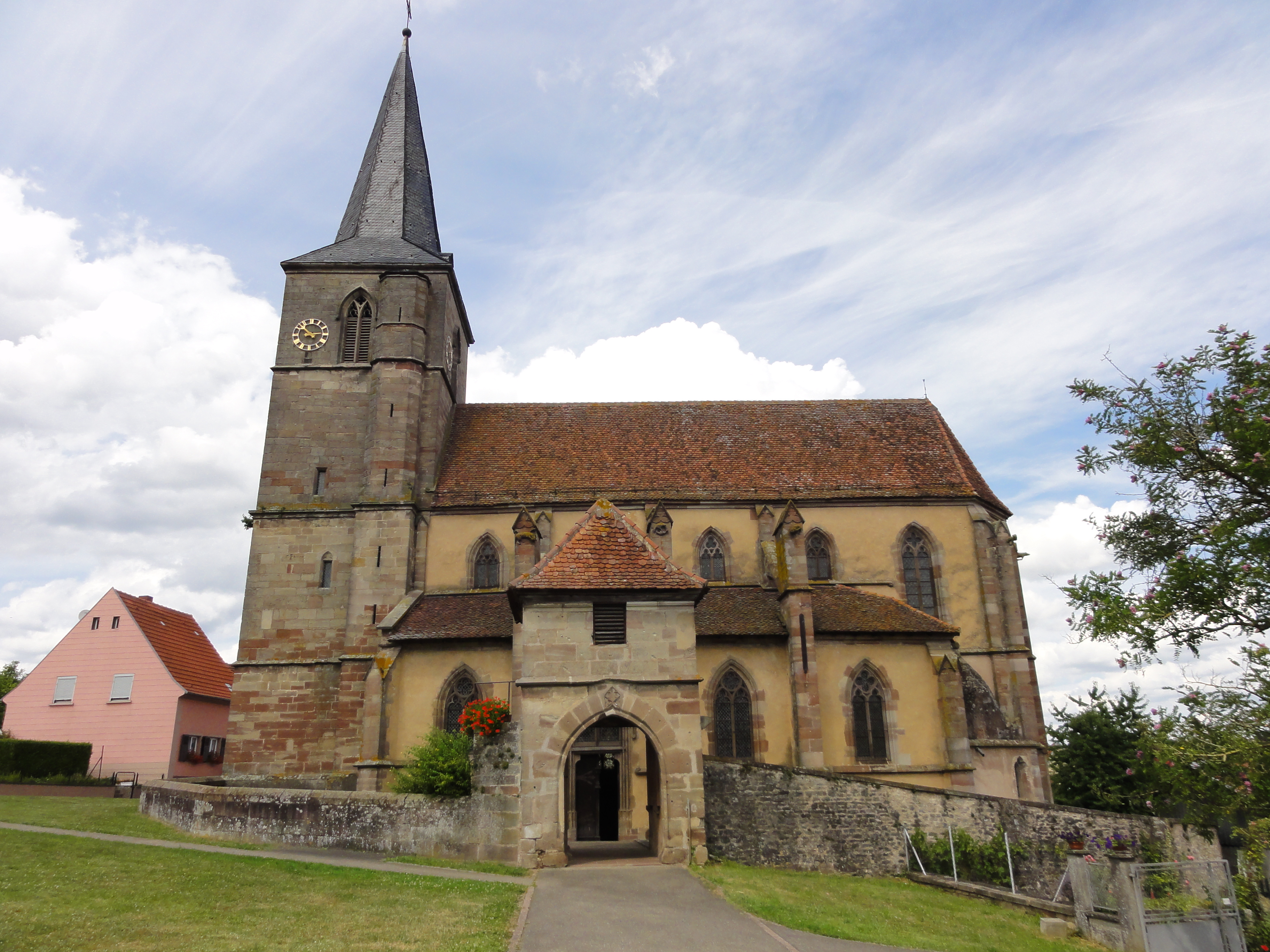
Église fortifiée de Domfessel

Église fortifiée de Domfessel is a Lutheran church in Domfessel, Bas-Rhin, Alsace, France. Originally built in 1340, it became a registered Monument historique in 1877.
