= Rohan Castle =

18th-century neoclassical palace in the city of Saverne in Alsace, France

Coordinates: 48°44′32″N 7°21′48″E

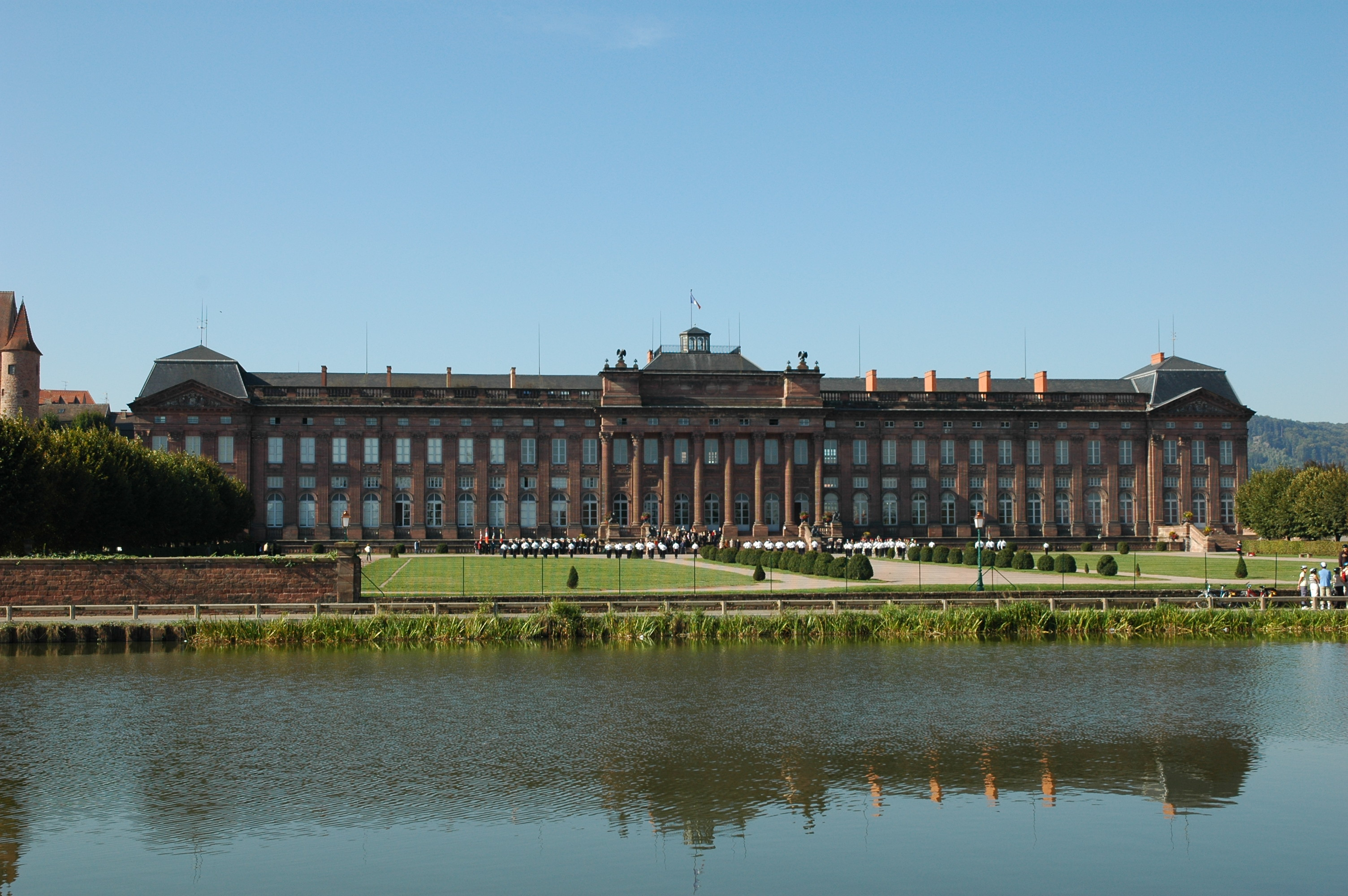
Park façade with colonnade and central risalit, Marne-Rhine Canal in the foreground

Rohan Castle (French: Château des Rohan, German: Rohan-Schloss), also known as Château Neuf (New Castle) or the Château de Saverne (German: Schloss Zabern), is an eighteenth-century neoclassical palace in the city of Saverne in Alsace, France. It was one of the residences of Archbishops of Strasbourg, rulers of the Prince-Bishopric of Strasbourg, which was an ecclesiastical principality of the Holy Roman Empire from the 13th century until 1803. Various members of the princely Rohan family were Prince-Bishop in the 18th century. The 140 metre wide façade of red Vosges sandstone is considered to be one of the most impressive examples of its kind.

== History ==
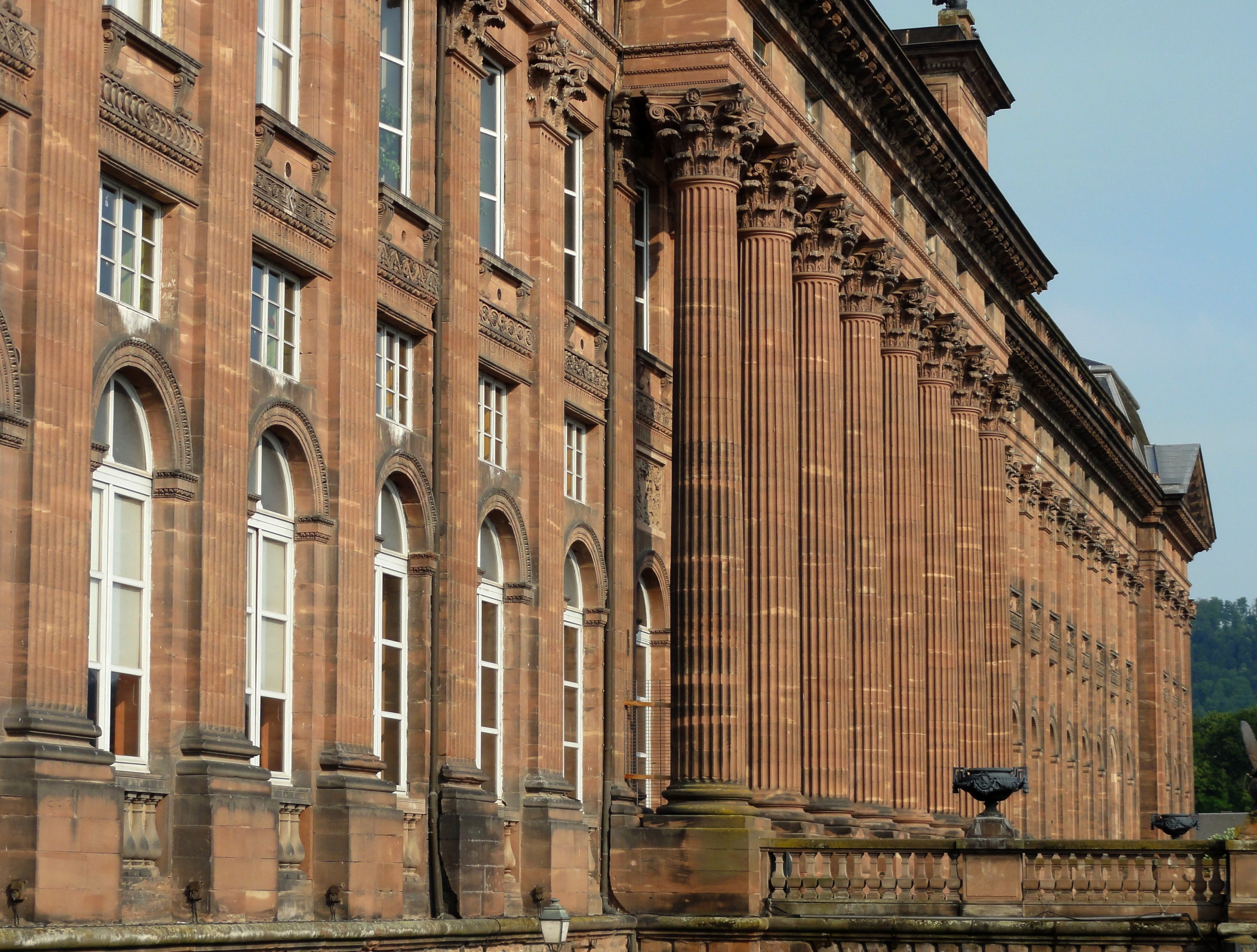
The garden facade

=== Middle Ages ===
Saverne belonged to the Prince-Bishopric of Strasbourg, of which it was the “capital,” and where the Prince-bishop of Strasbourg, the sovereign ruler, often resided starting in the 13th century due to political rivalries between him and the city of Strasbourg's citizenry. The then-residence, a medieval castle, incorporated the northern corner of the former Roman fort. Little is known about this structure, as it was replaced in the early 15th century by the Château Vieux (Old Castle) located nearby, in close proximity to the Collegiate Church of Notre-Dame-de-la-Nativité, which is still preserved today. This residence was further expanded under Prince-Bishop Albert of Palatinate-Mosbach (1478–1506).

=== The Baroque Palace ===
In the next construction phase, a Renaissance castle was built, which was heavily damaged during the Peasants' War in 1525 and subsequently rebuilt. In the early 17th century, the building was neglected and not maintained by the Prince-Bishops for an extended period. Additionally, the city was besieged twice during the Thirty Years' War in 1622 and 1636. When Prince-Bishop Franz Egon von Fürstenberg-Heiligenberg (1663–1682) arrived, he had what remained demolished and replaced it with a four-winged structure on an almost square layout from 1667 to 1670. Hardly had this been completed before the Prince-Bishop envisioned an extension: the northeastern wing of the building square was replaced by a new wing, 110 meters long, which extended well beyond the castle's square layout to the southeast. The architect is unknown. Antoine Coysevox and Claude Audran the Younger were involved in the interior decoration.

The four successive 18th-century bishops after Franz Egon were from the Rohan family:

- Armand Gaston Maximilien de Rohan (1704–1749);
- Armand II. François Auguste de Rohan-Soubise (1749–1756);
- Louis César Constantin de Rohan-Guéméné (1756–1779); and
- Louis René Édouard de Rohan-Guéméné (1779–1803).

They continued to expand the palace complex in a baroque style. The palace saw two of the three marriages of Charles, Prince de Soubise; firstly in 1741 to Anne Therese of Savoy and secondly to Anne Victoire of Hesse-Rotenburg in 1745. The furnishings were said to be magnificent. However, nothing has survived, as everything was destroyed in a major fire on the night of 7 on 8 September 1779.

=== Gallery: the Baroque palace ===
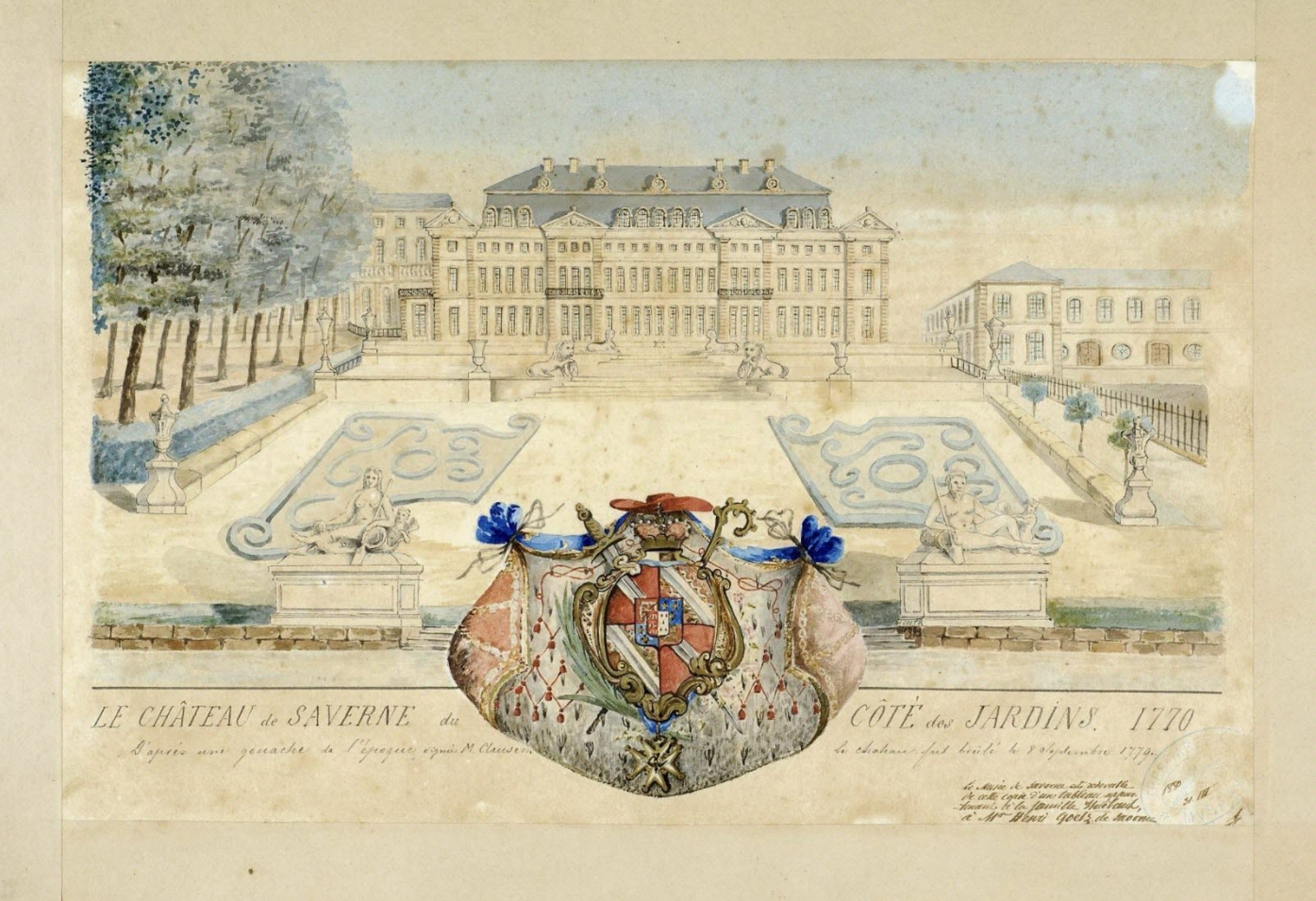
The Château around 1770

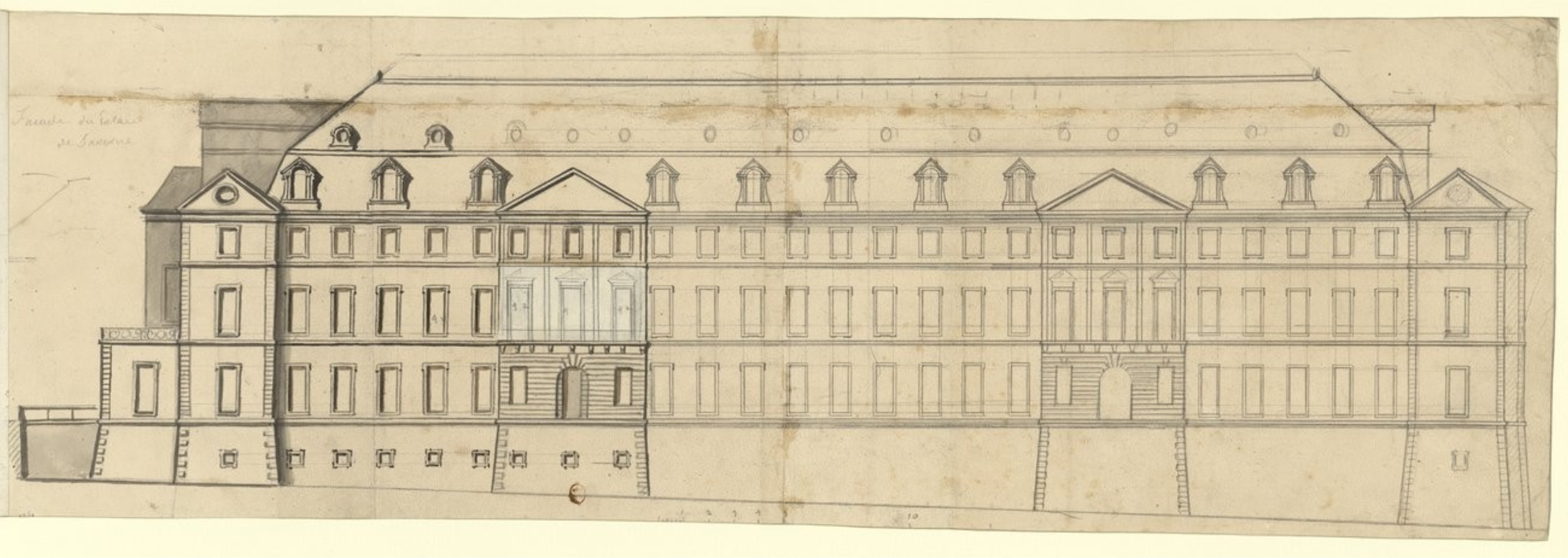
The palace by Robert de Cotte around 1729

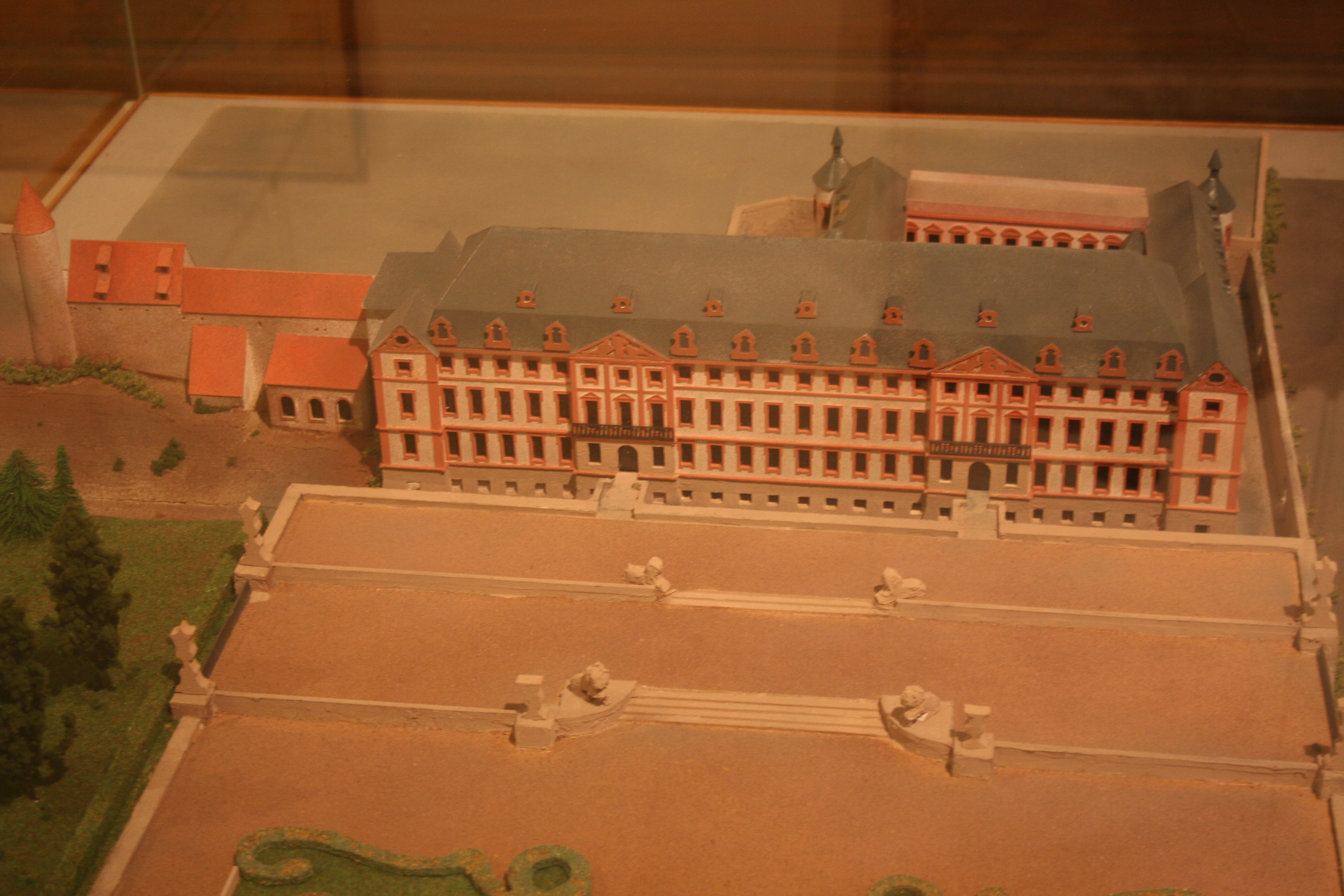
Model of the baroque Château before the fire of 1779

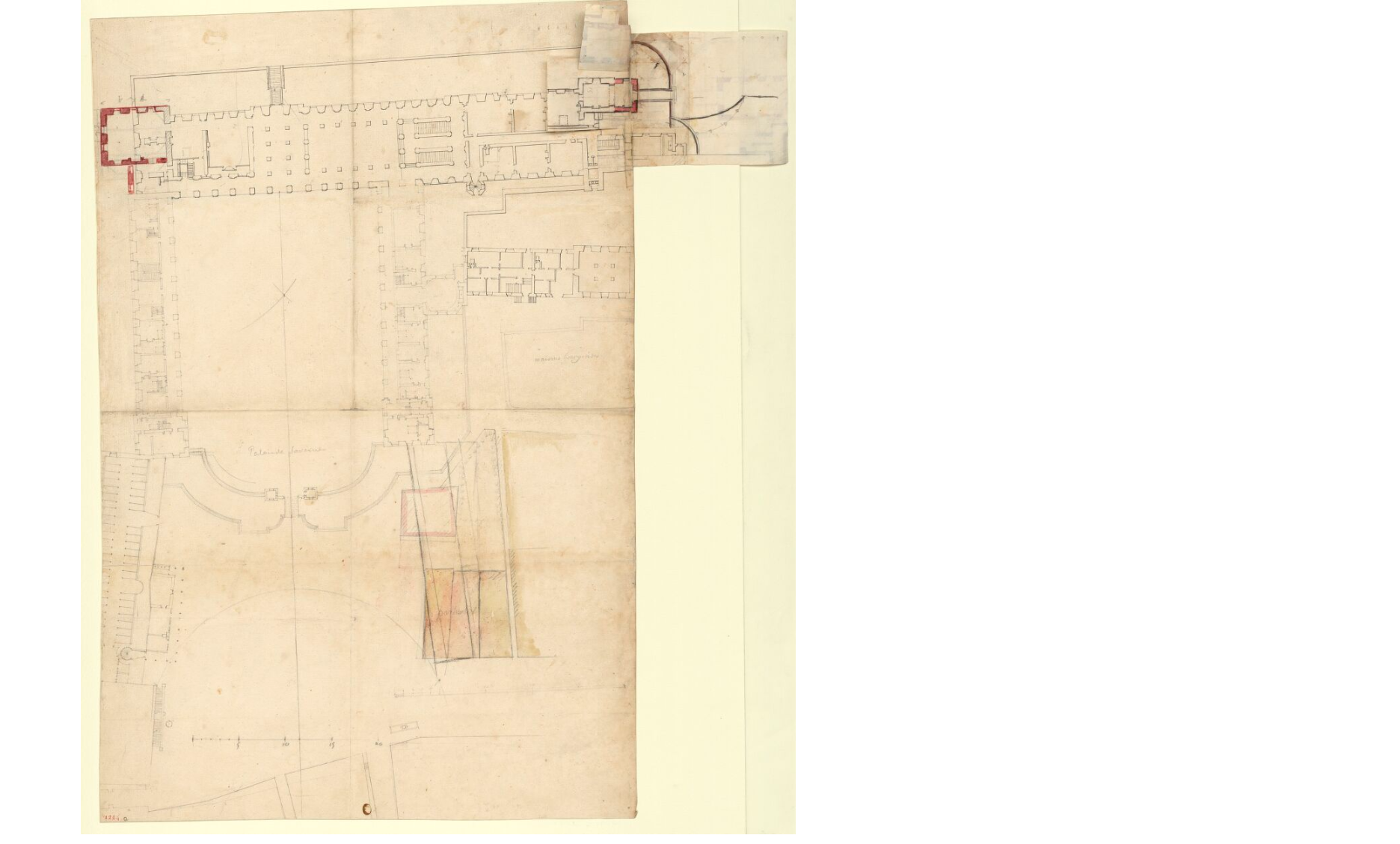
Plan for a redesign of the palace by Robert de Cotte around 1729

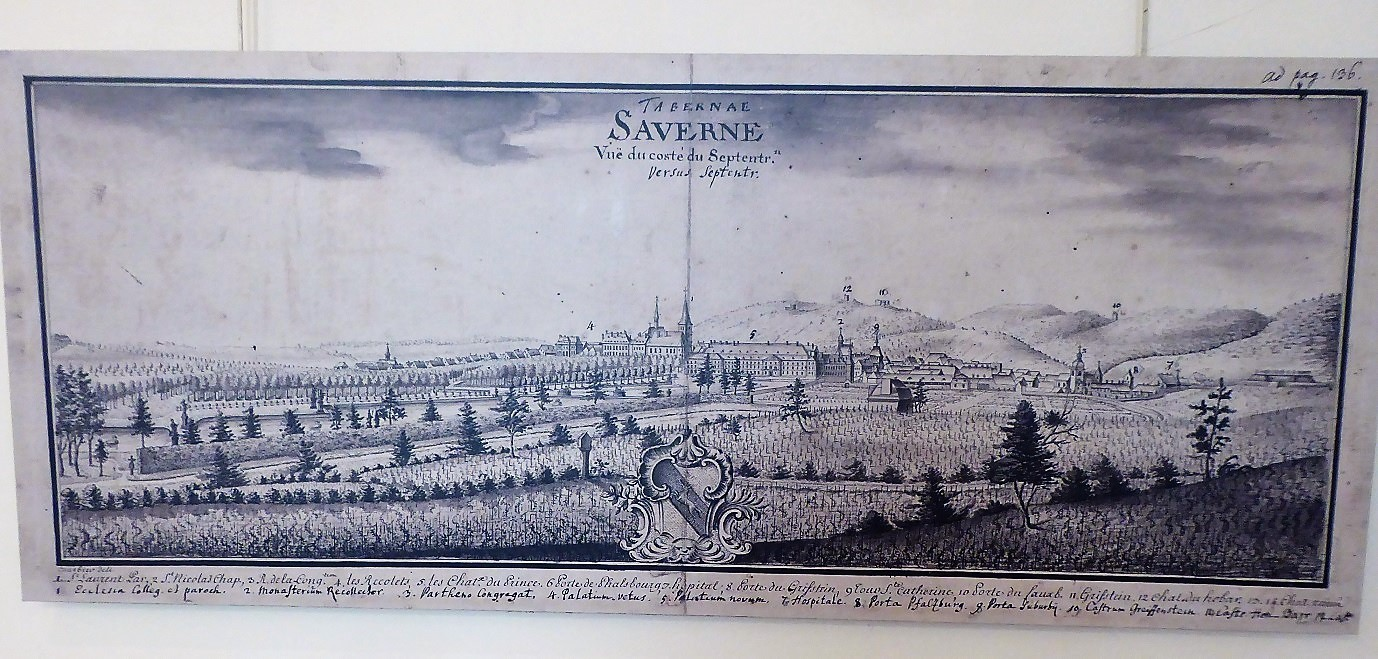
View of Saverne, the château and its park by Jean-Martin Weiss in 1751

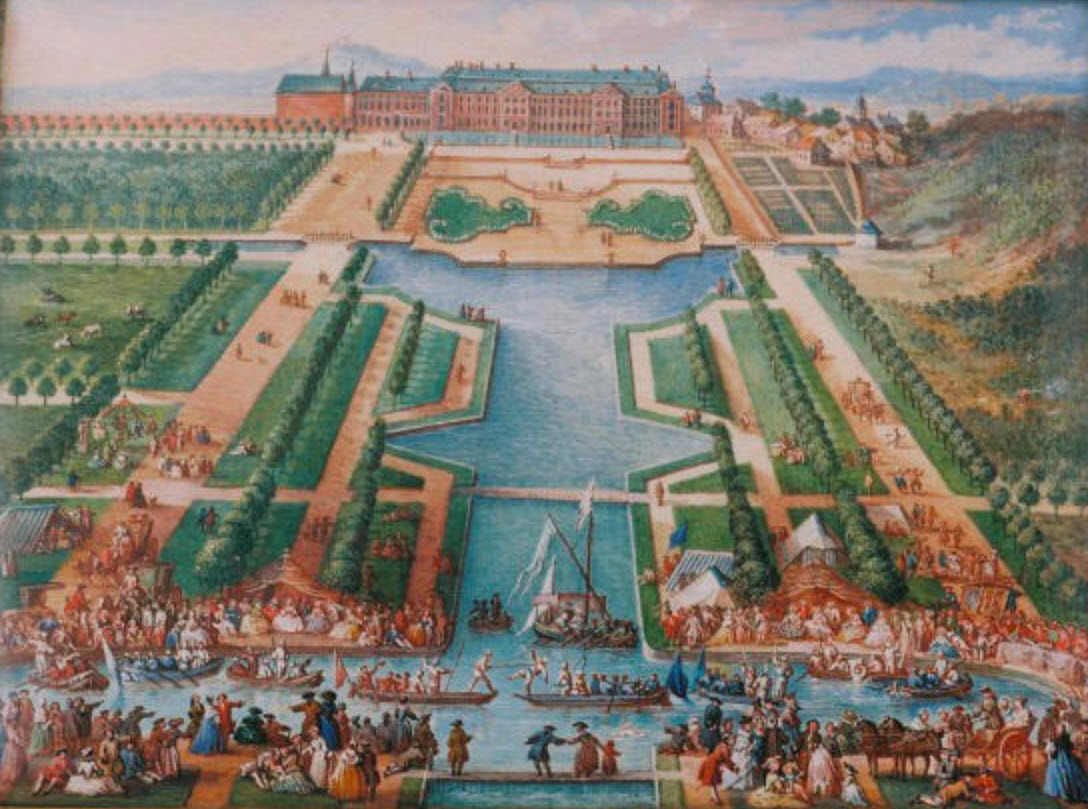
View of the palace on a snuffbox by Louis-Nicolas van Blarenberghe (1763-1764). The painting shows the Cardinal de Rohan receiving a lady in a tent, maybe Marie-Antoinette on her journey in 1770 to marry the Dauphin, later Louis XVI (if so, the miniature was a later addition to the snuffbox) (collections Waddesdon Manor)

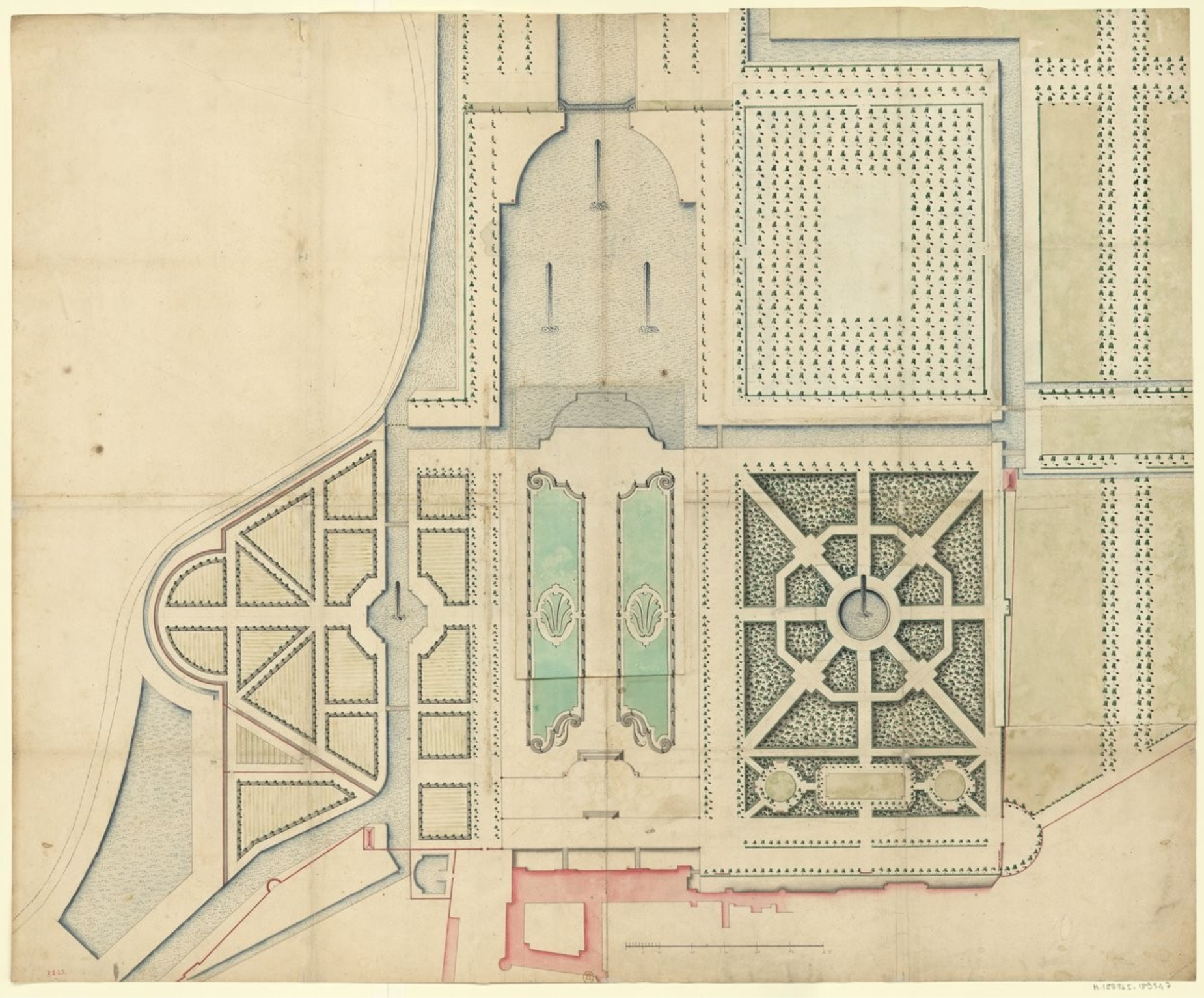
Plan of the palace and its park by Robert de Cotte in 1712

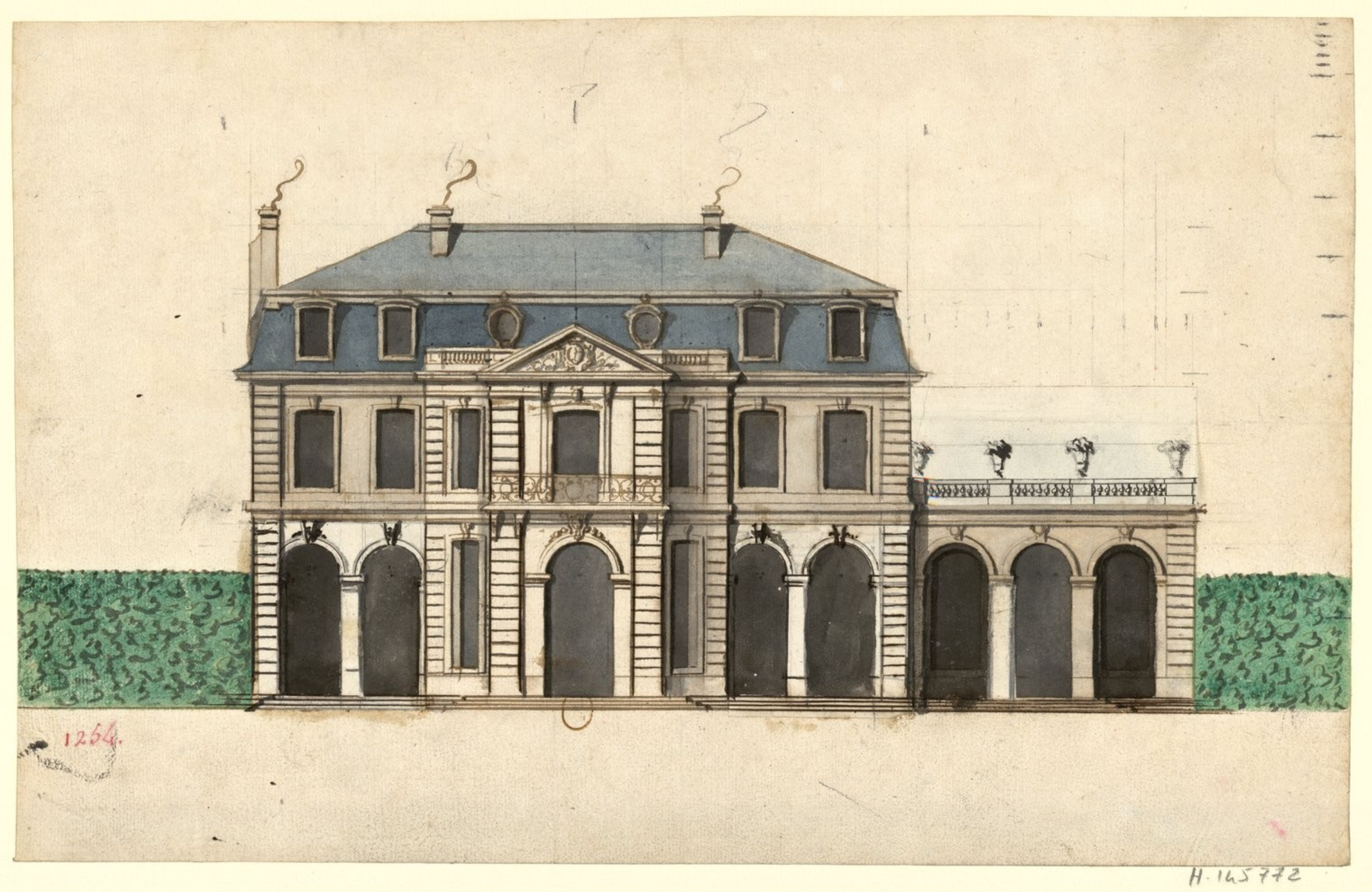
Design for a Pavillion des Bains by Robert de Cotte (intended to be right next of the Upper castle)

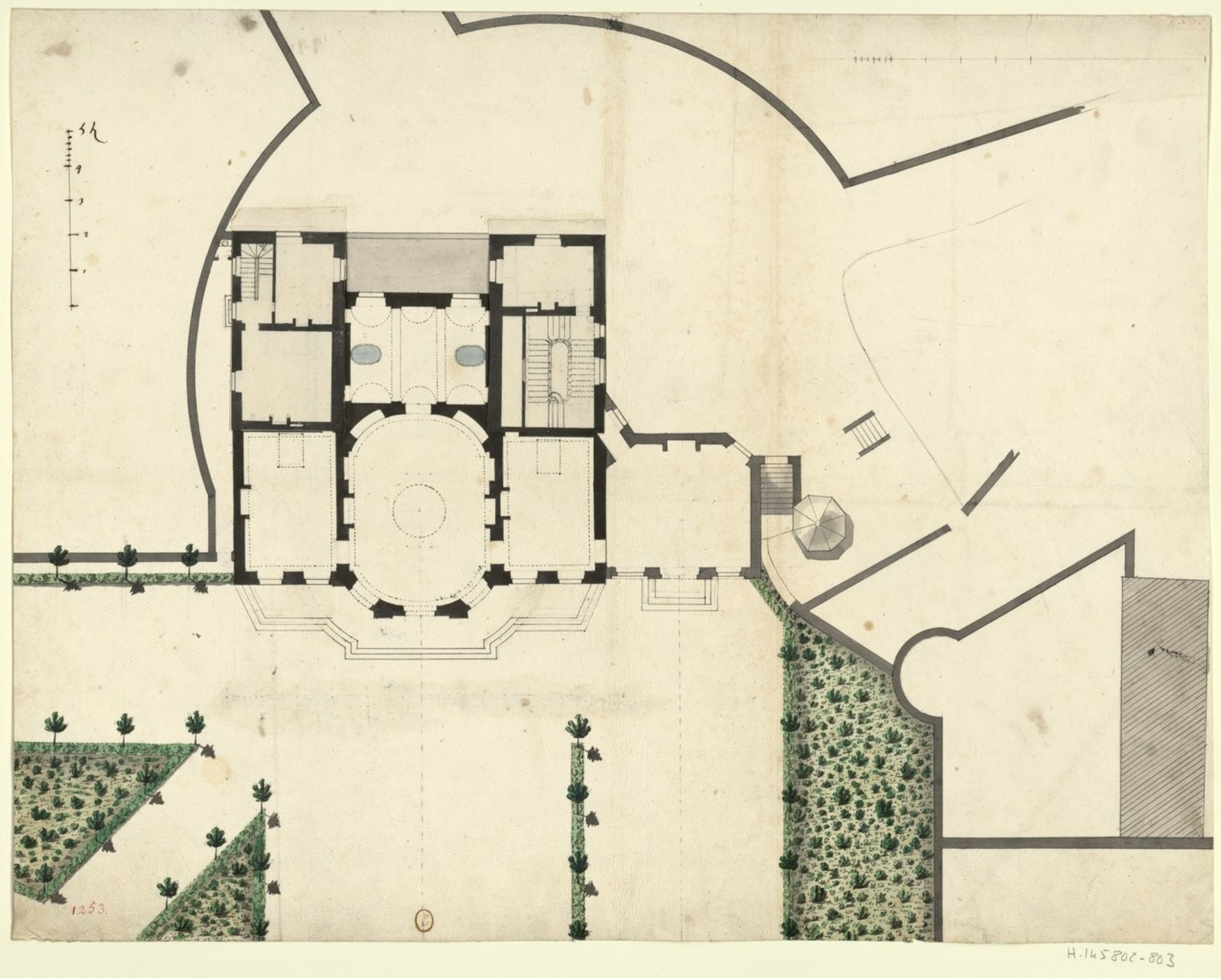
Plan for a Pavillion des Bains by Robert de Cotte (intended to be right below in the gardens)

=== The Neoclassical Palace ===
The palace was rebuilt on the same site from 1780 to 1790 by architect Nicolas Alexandre Salins de Montfort. The patron was Cardinal Louis René Édouard de Rohan-Guéméné, who also owned other residences, including the magnificent Palais Rohan in Strasbourg and the more modest Rohan Palace in Mutzig. In order to furnish the castle, Louis René assembled a vast collection of costly Qing porcelain and lacquerware. The surviving pieces of this collection are prominently displayed in the apartments of the Strasbourg palace.

When the French Revolution broke out, the palace was in the final stages of construction. In 1790, Cardinal Louis René Édouard de Rohan-Guéméné moved his residence to Ettenheim, in the eastern part of his principality across the Rhine, thus leaving the palace without a purpose.

=== Gallery: the Neoclassical palace ===
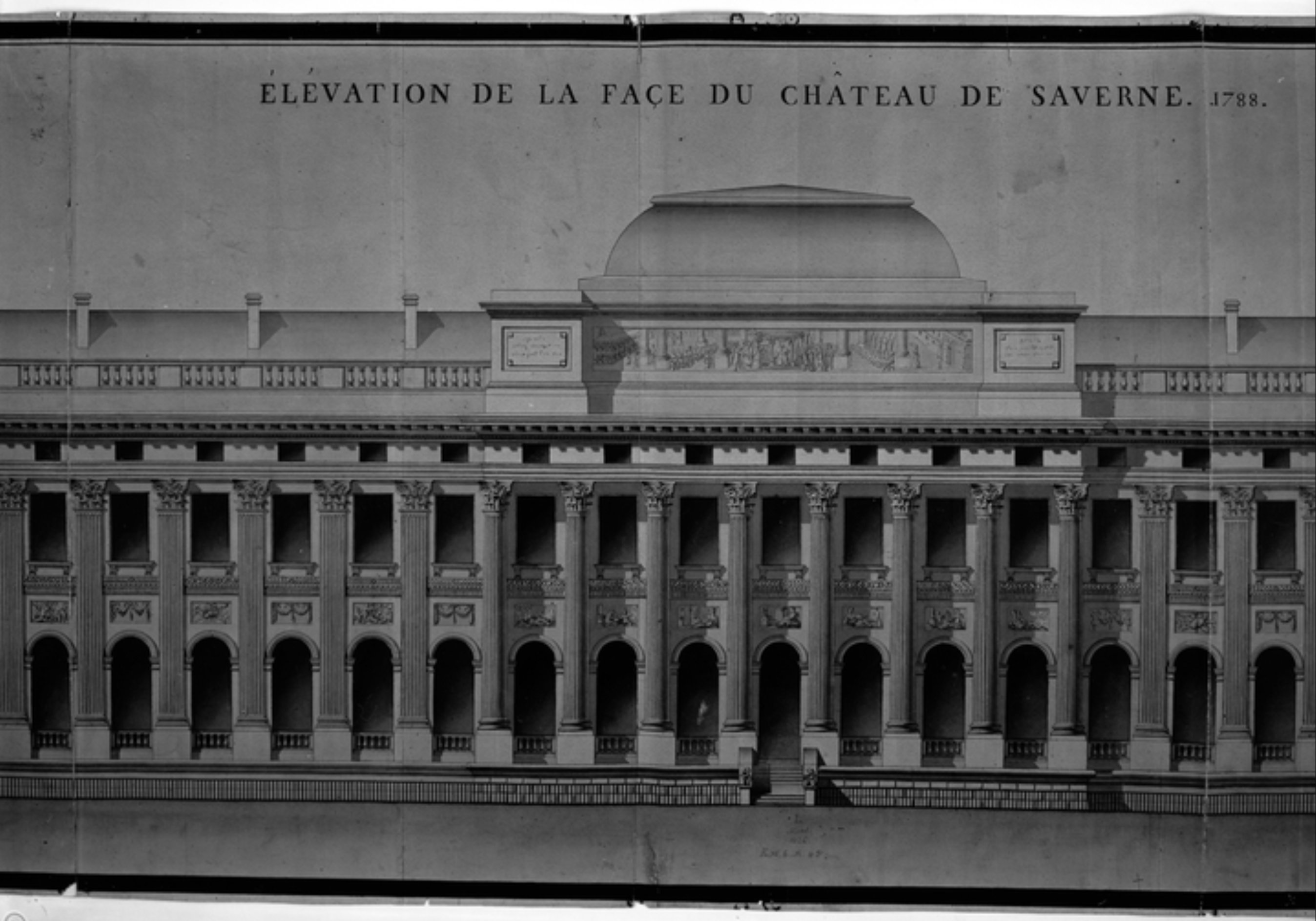
Design for the central risalit facing the garden

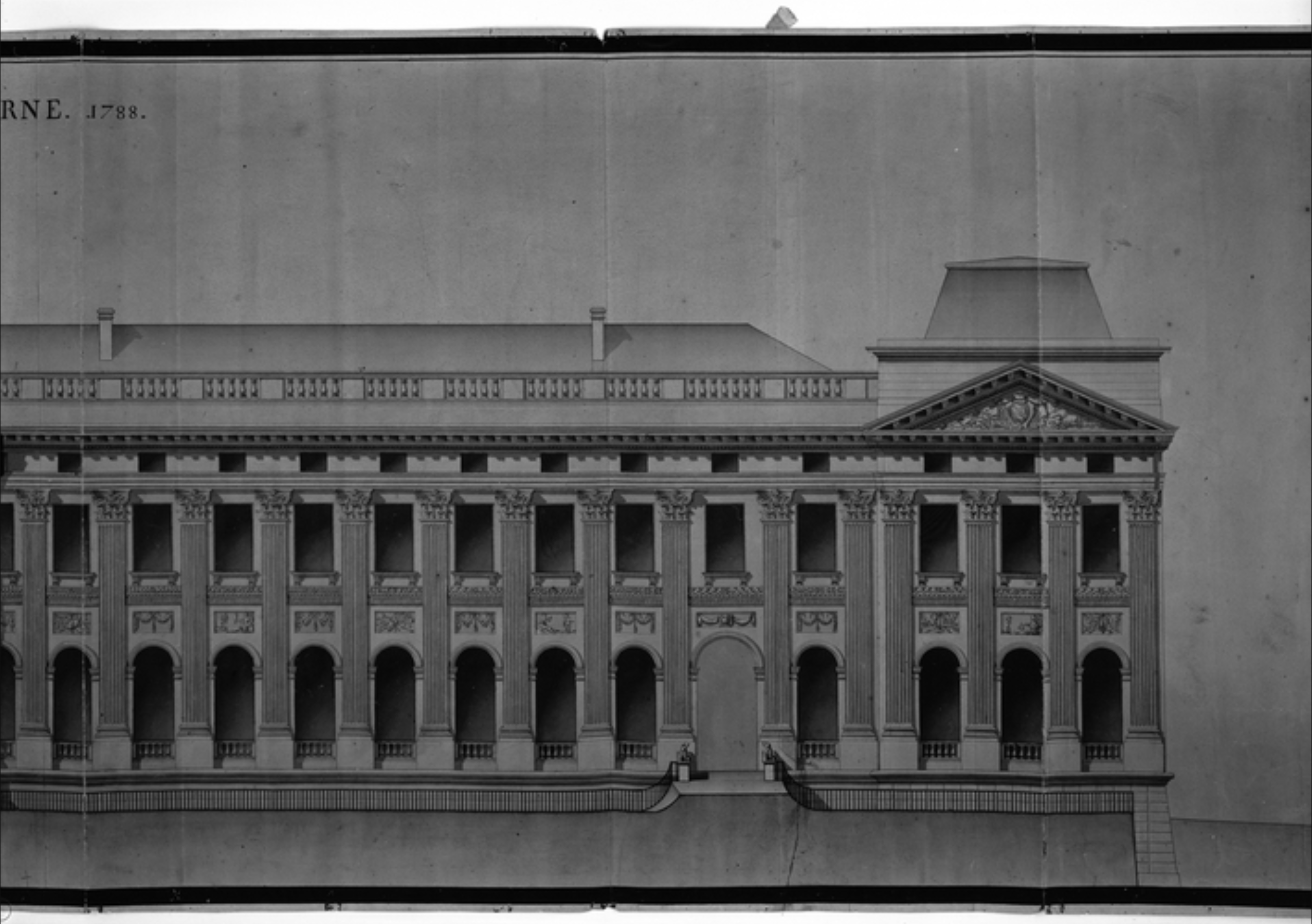
Design for the right side of the garden front

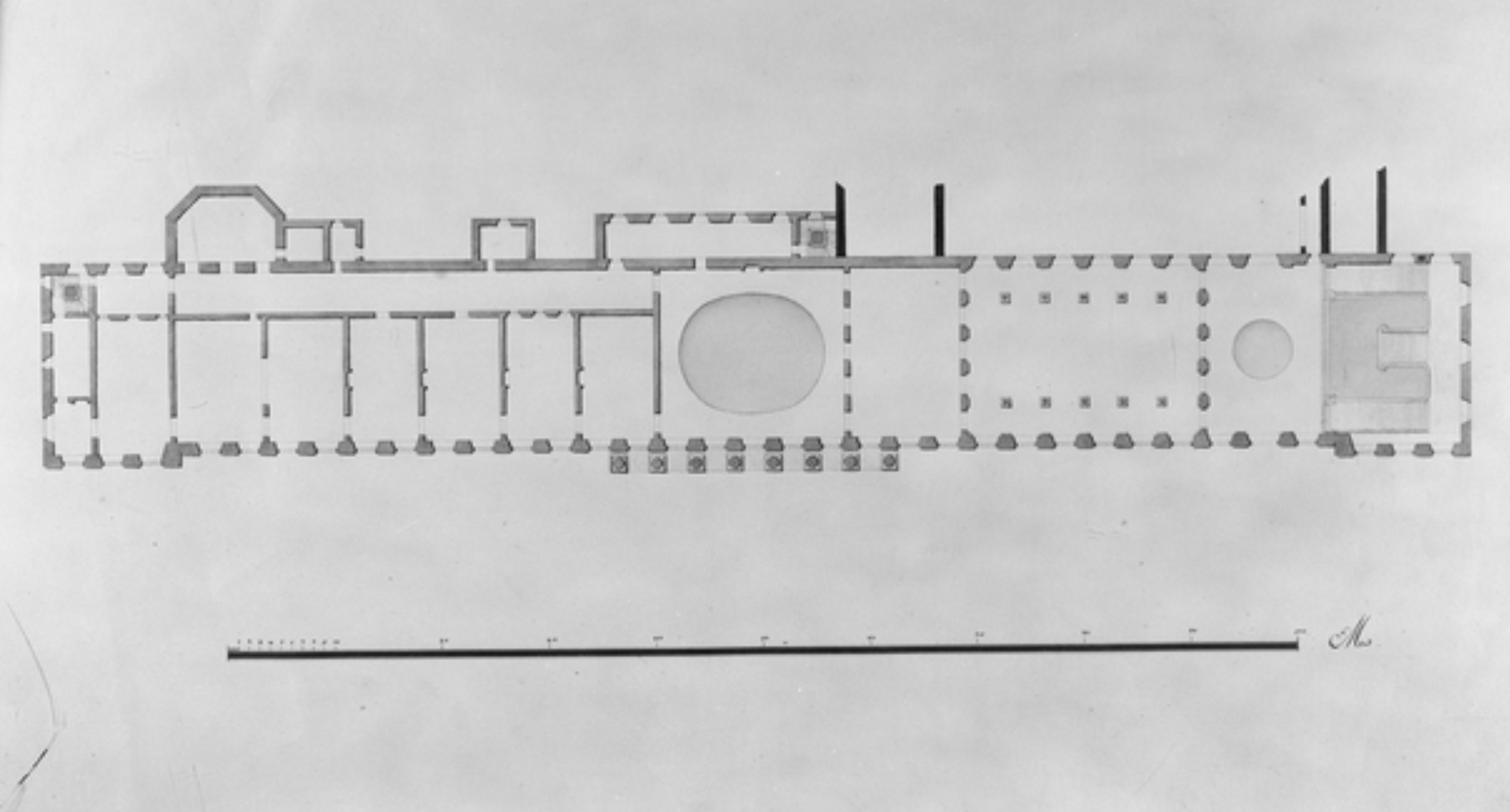
Plan of the palace main floor

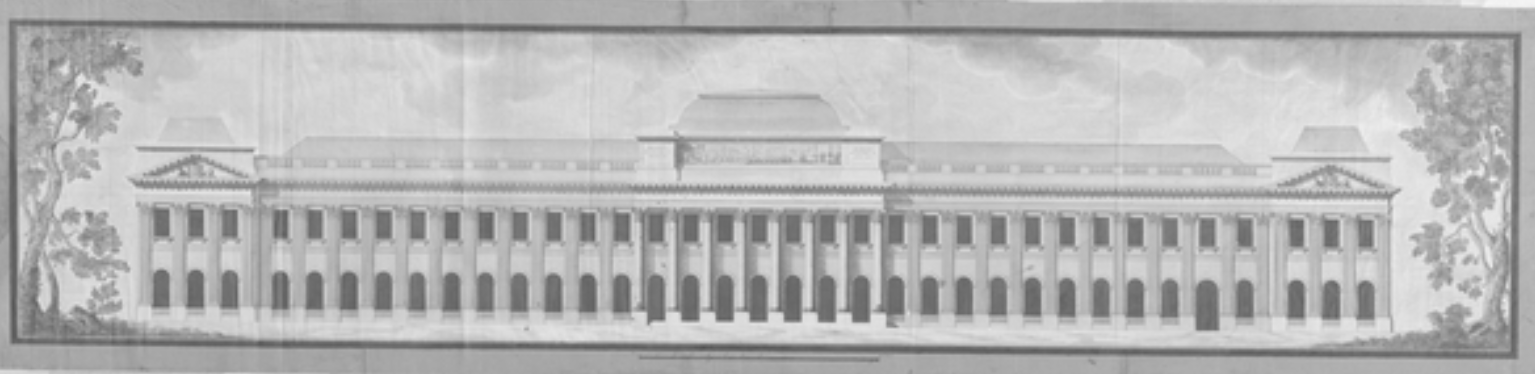
The palace facade

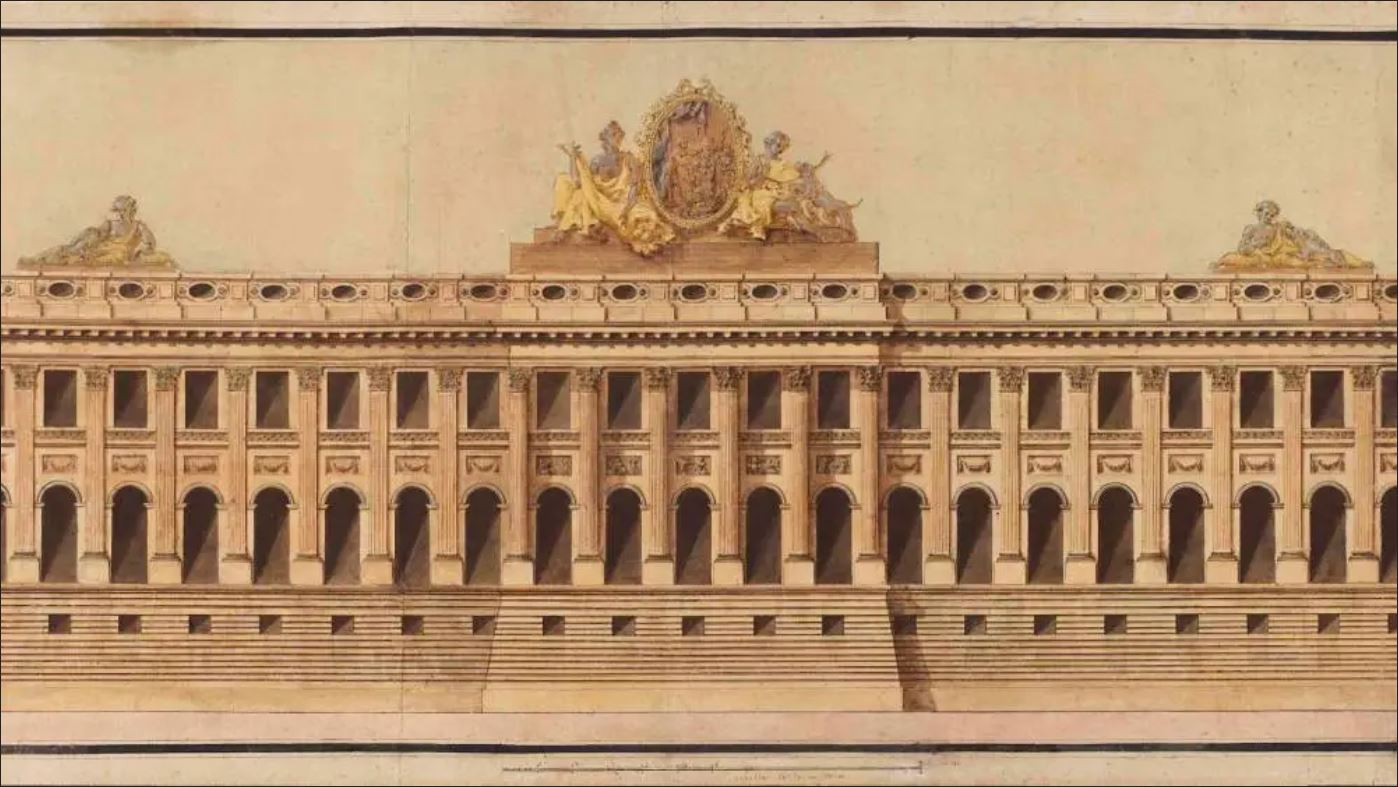
Design proposal by Nicolas Alexandre Salins de Montfort

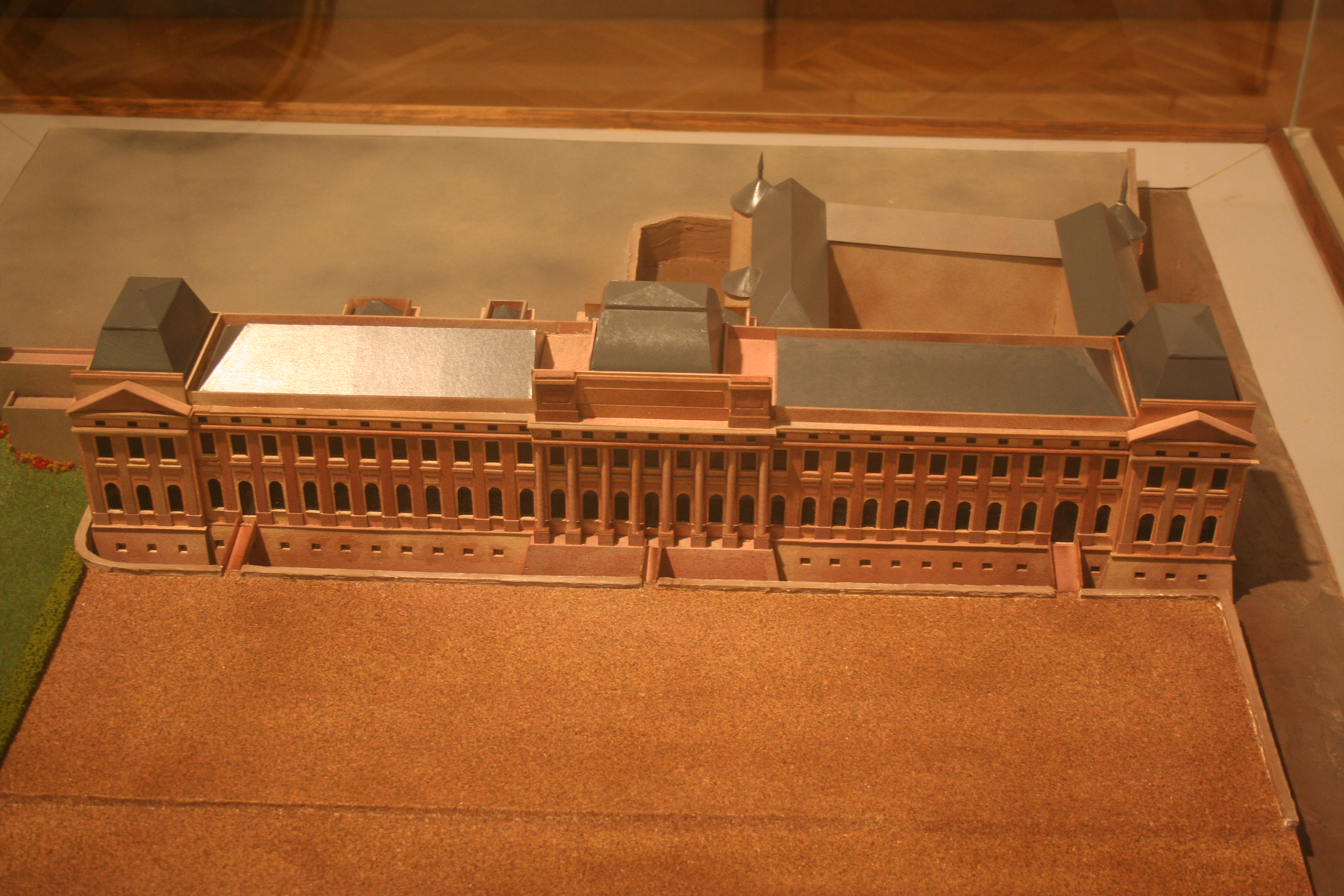
Model of the neoclassical palace at the end of the 18th century

=== Start of 19th century ===
The unfinished structure was seized and nationalized during the Revolution. Attempts by the state to sell it were unsuccessful. The state eventually used it temporarily as a barracks. Then it stood vacant until 1803, when it was sold to the city of Saverne, which ultimately donated it to the Legion of Honor with the expectation that they would restore and use the building; however, the Legion instead sold parts of it as building materials. Demolition and various uses were considered. The main wing by Salins de Montfort served as a barracks again from 1815 to 1818. In 1819, two of the wings of the square structure were actually demolished, and the northwestern wing was converted into the town hall. In 1830, the building once more served as a barracks, and starting in 1836, the city again sought a buyer, though unsuccessfully, or any kind of use to dispose of the building. Among the proposals was the idea of offering it to the Compagnie du chemin de fer de Paris à Strasbourg for use as a station building.

=== Napoleon III and the palace as military barracks ===
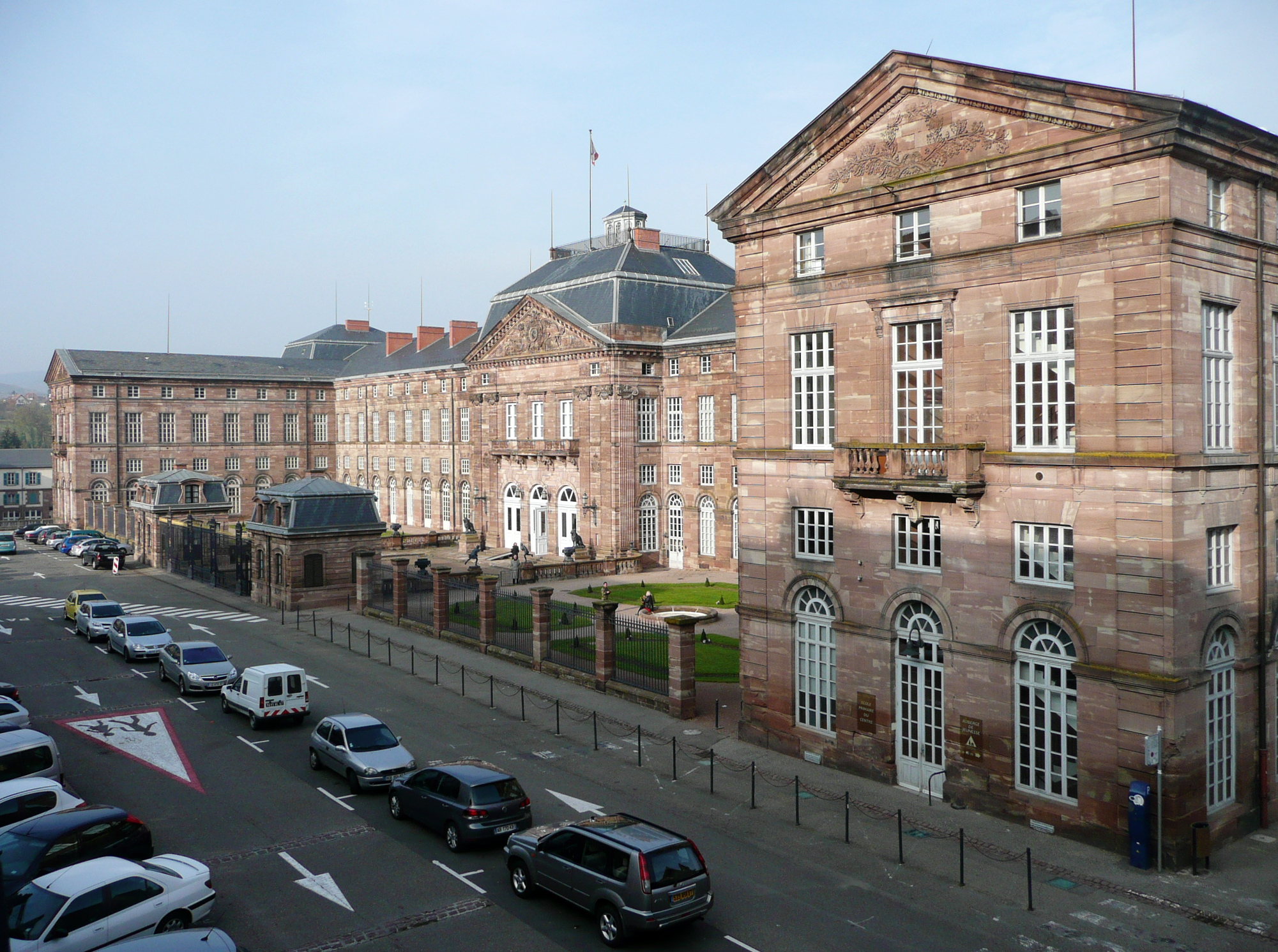
Town façade

The gradual decline of the building was stopped under Napoleon III, at that time still President of the Second French Republic, who promised to take up the matter and rid the town of Saverne of its issue. Housing was to be created for widows of high-ranking military officers and officials. The work lasted from 1853 to 1857: the remaining square building, which the town had last used as a town hall, was demolished. The southwest side of the Montfort wing and the square in front of it were redesigned. Seventy-eight apartments and 130 rooms for servants were added. The main floor was horizontally divided to add a mezzanine level. To accommodate the required windows, relief sculptures originally located between the ground and upper floor windows were removed. Some of these were embedded in the retaining wall east of the castle. Ultimately, the renovation cost two million francs.

The occupancy of the complex by eligible tenants was low. By 1862, only 15 of the 78 apartments were occupied, and by 1871, 18 were in use. After the Franco-Prussian War, Prussian military forces moved into the castle, whose interior was remodeled for this purpose. Beginning in 1890, the 2nd Upper Rhine Infantry Regiment No. 99 was stationed here, making a name for itself with the Zabern Affair in 1913. After the First World War, the French military continued to use the castle as a barracks. In 1933, it was placed under historical protection. The relief sculptures removed from the garden-side façade during the 19th-century renovation were replaced in the central risalit area with new ones meant to resemble the originals. During and after the Second World War, the palace was used first by the Wehrmacht and then by the U.S. Army, but it no longer served as a permanent garrison. The French Army eventually lost interest in the building, so in 1952, it was returned to the city of Saverne.

=== Today ===
Today, one of the Palace's wings is used as a youth hostel, and another houses the Espace Rohan, Saverne's 500-seat theatre and concert hall. Also, it houses the municipal museum of Saverne (history, decorative arts, a large archaeological department), which was joined by the art and ethnographic collection of the politician Louise Weiss in the 20th century.

The castle is listed as a Monument historique since 1933 by the French Ministry of Culture.

== Architecture ==
=== Exterior ===
The impressive, 140-meter-long neoclassical northeast façade from the 18th century faced the adjoining park at that time. It is structured with a central seven-bay projection, flanked by two three-bay end projections and the eleven-bay wings in between, whose bays are divided by Corinthian pilasters. The building has two main floors, along with a mezzanine level between the two main floors and one beneath the roof. The central projection is adorned with eight Corinthian columns. It is crowned by an attic with protruding sections on each side, where cast-iron eagles (from the Napoleonic era) were placed during the renovation phase under Napoleon III.

The city-facing façade is a result of the remodeling from 1853 to 1857. Its decoration features typical elements of Eclecticism interspersed with the insignia of the Second Empire. The arrangement of floors mirrors that of the garden-facing side. The main entrance is located city-side within the central projection. The façade opens onto a Cour d’honneur, which itself faces the Saverne marketplace. The two side wings are relatively short, giving the Cour d’honneur a compact appearance. The marketplace and the Cour d’honneur are separated by a magnificent wrought-iron fence and two pavilions, or gatehouses, positioned to the right and left of the entrance. During the period when the castle served as a barracks, these gatehouses were used as guardhouses.

=== Interior ===
Inside the palace, there is no longer any decor from the 18th century, and only a few elements remain from the 19th century. These include the entrance hall, main staircase, and a ballroom. The vaulted cellars are particularly impressive.

== Gallery: Views of the palace exterior ==
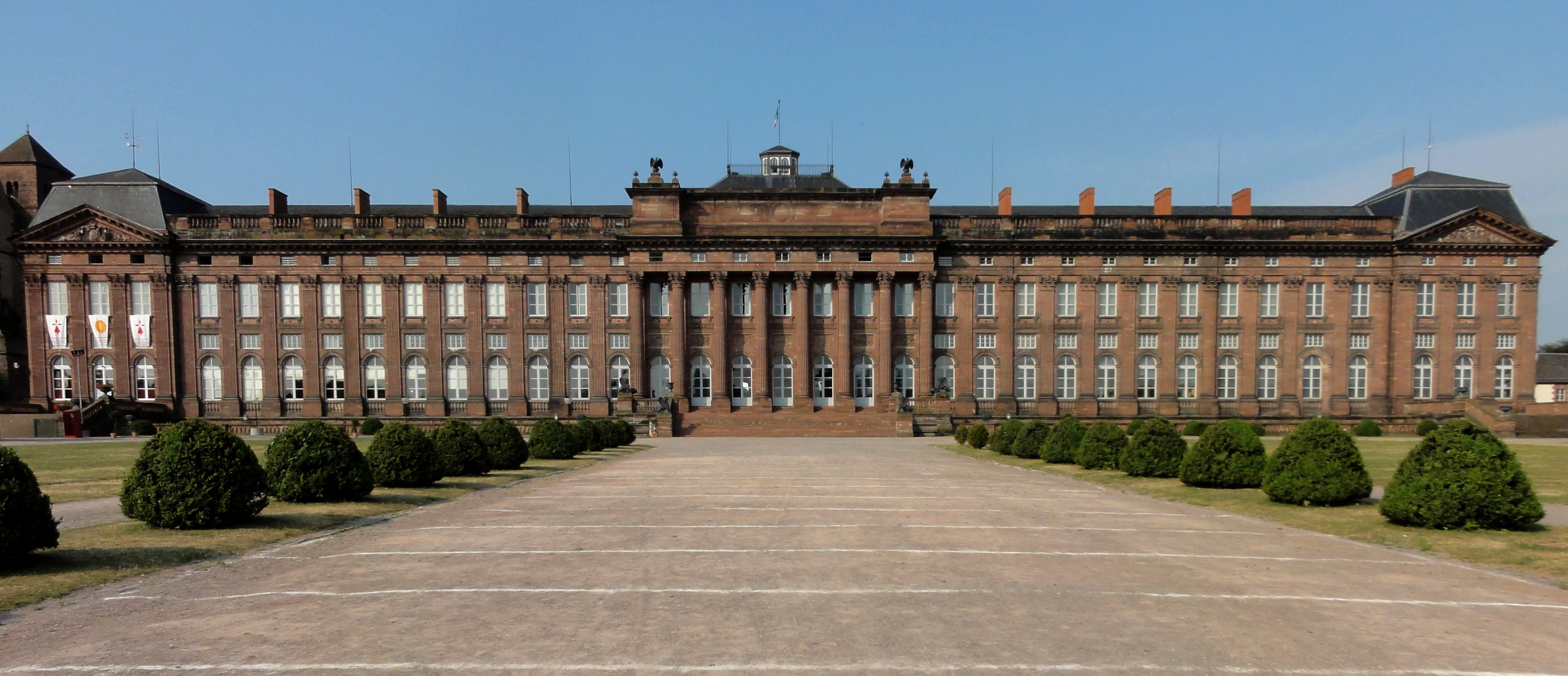
The palace facing the gardens

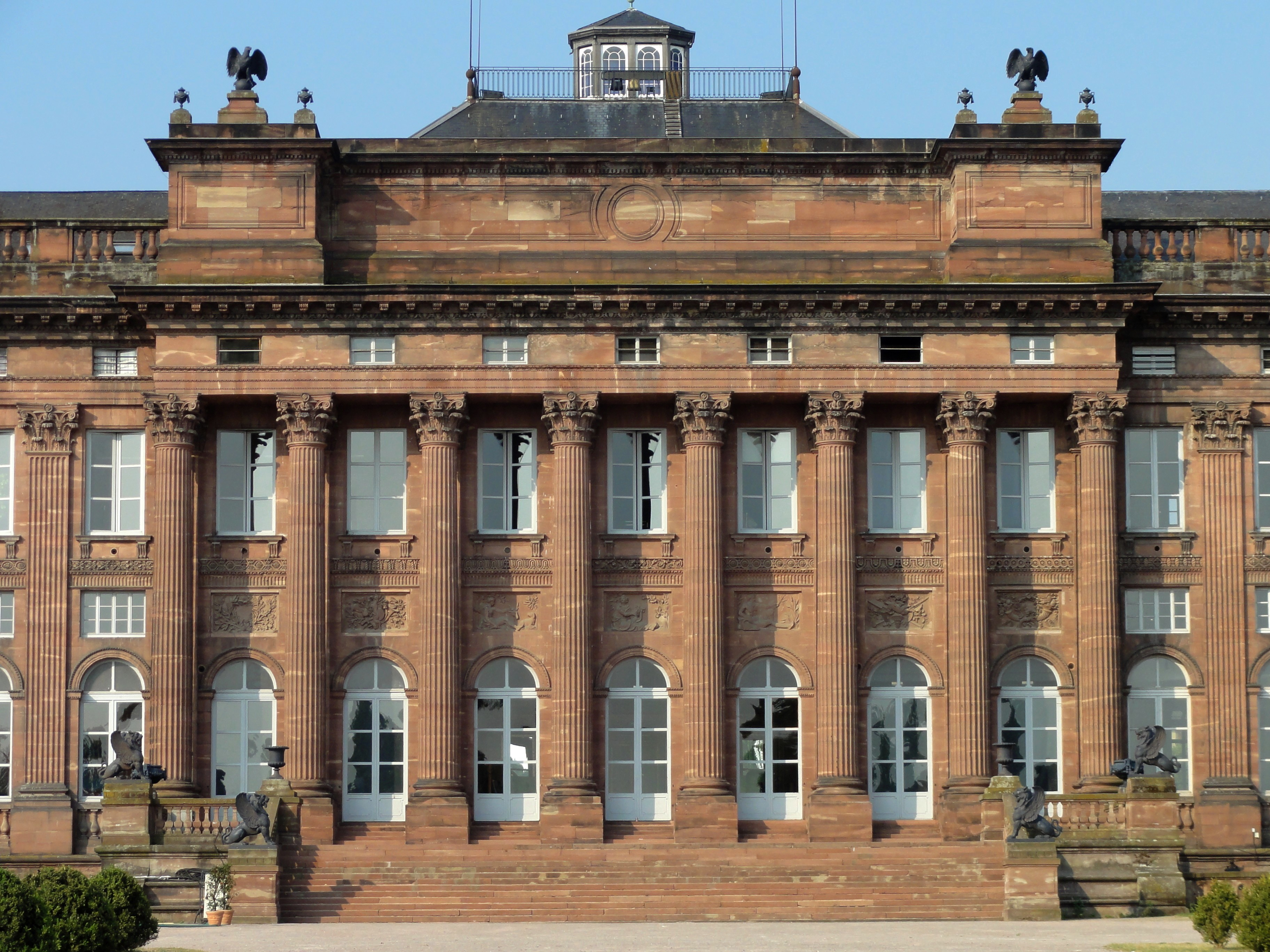
The central risalit facing the gardens

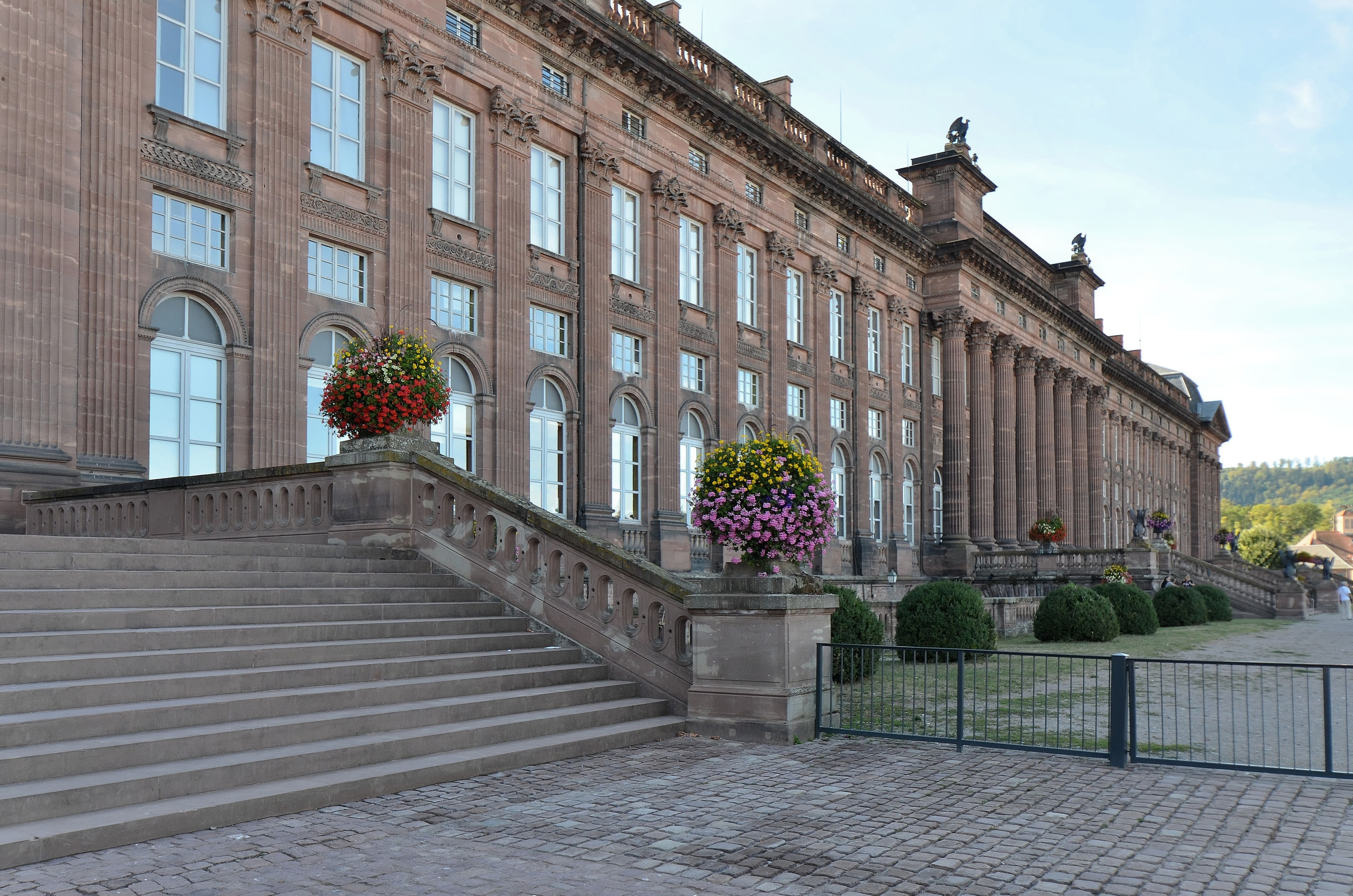
Another view of the garden front

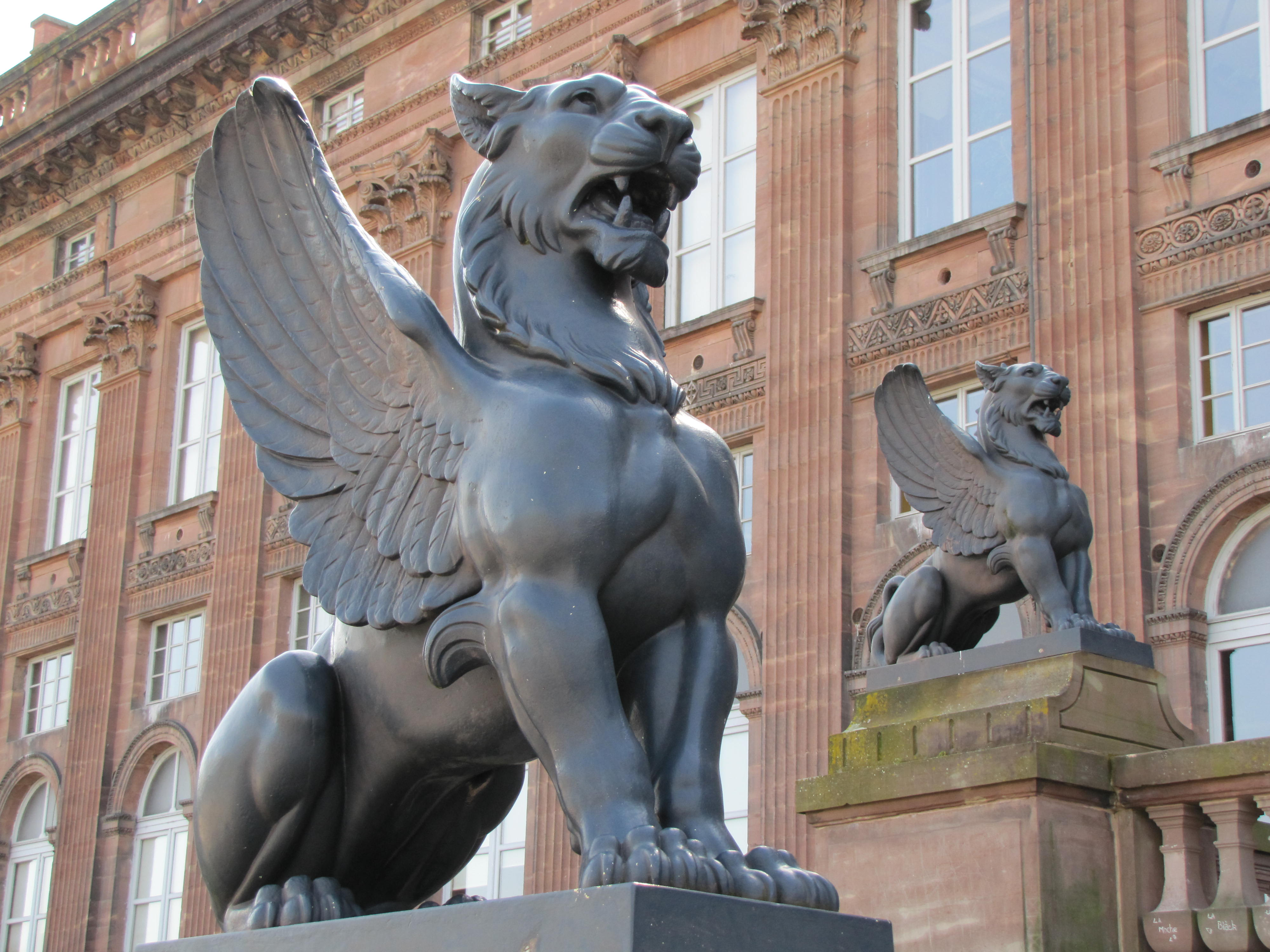
One of the winged lions guarding the palace

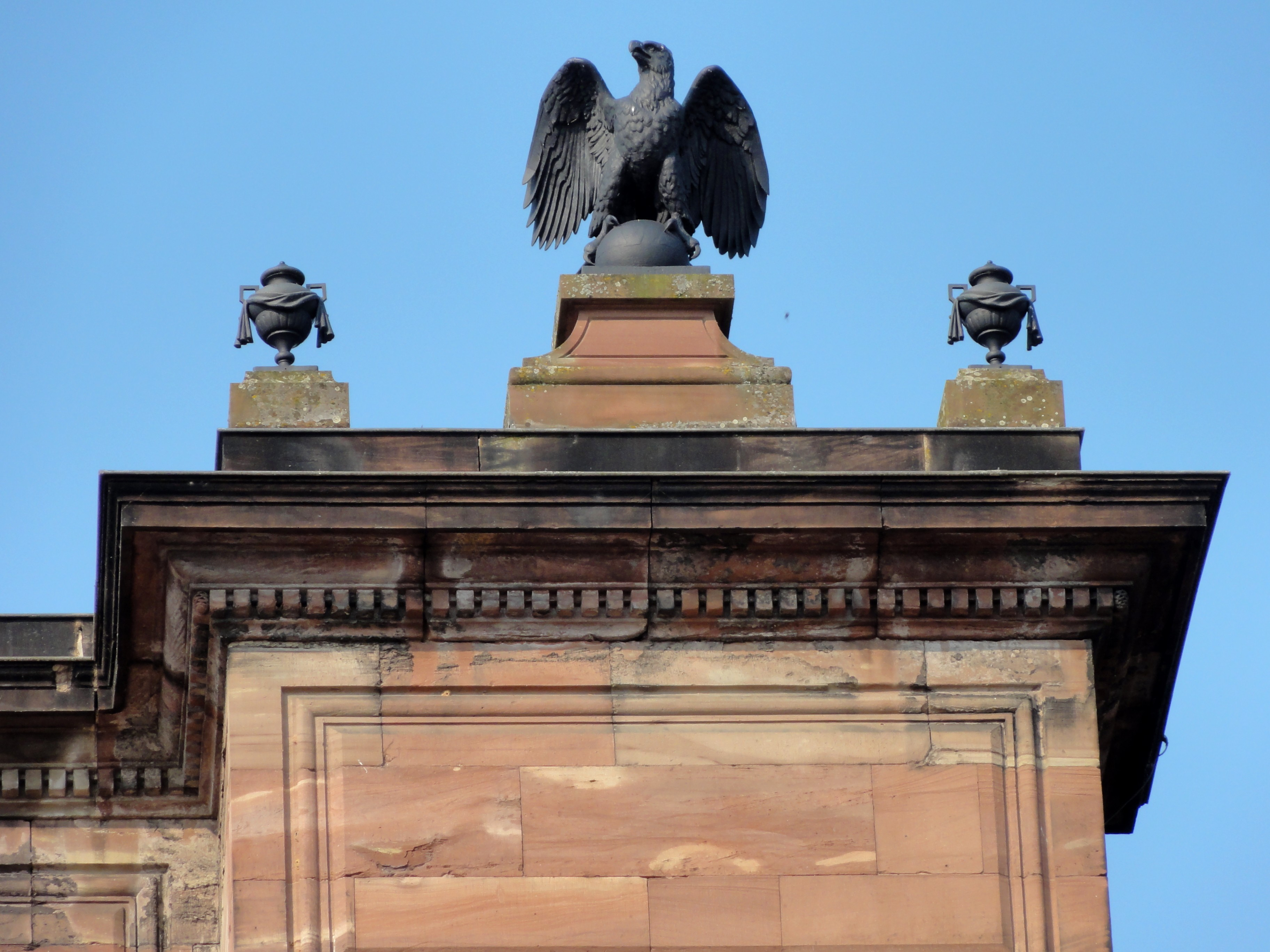
An imperial eagle on top of the palace roofs

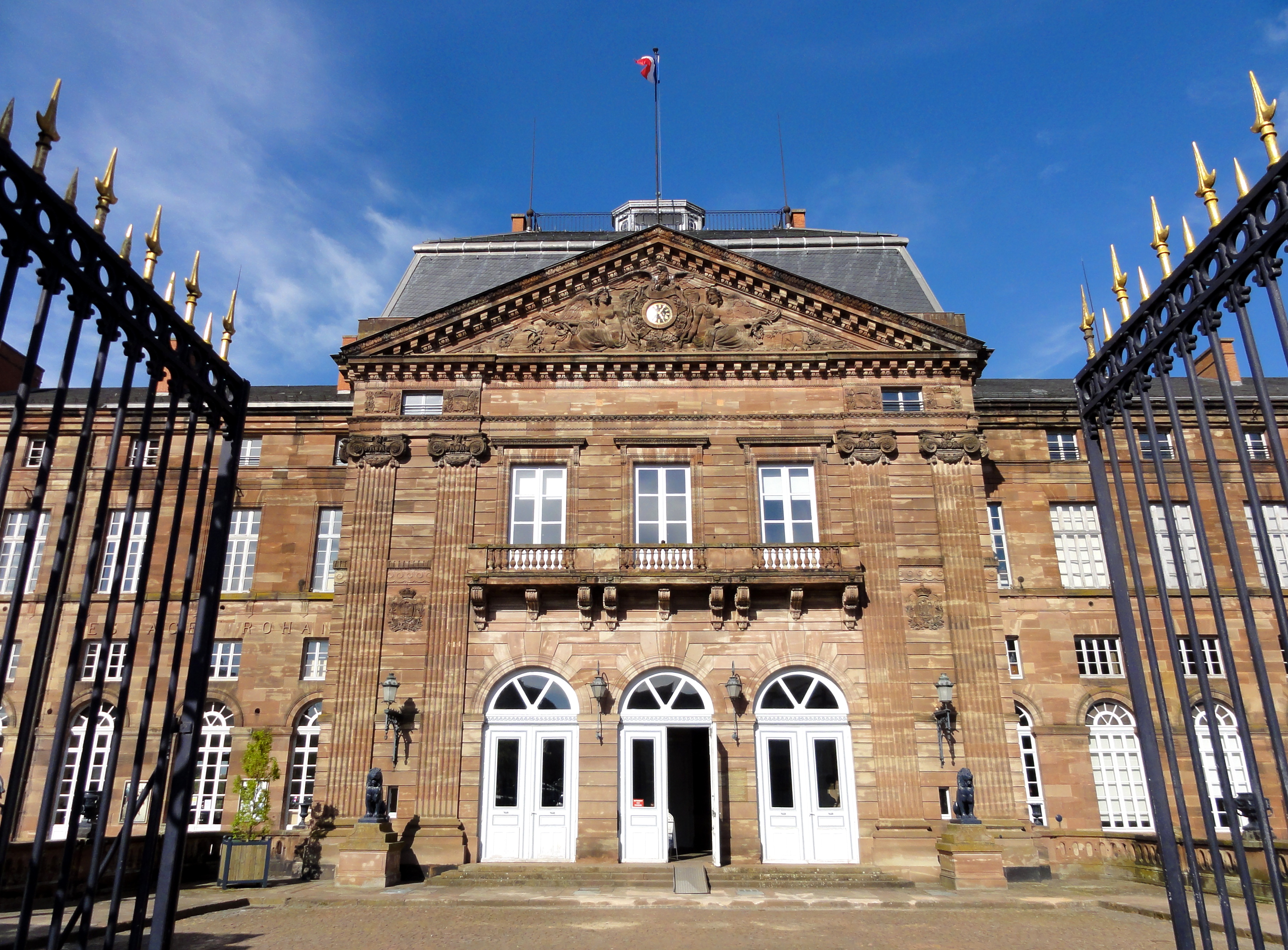
The entrance facing the city

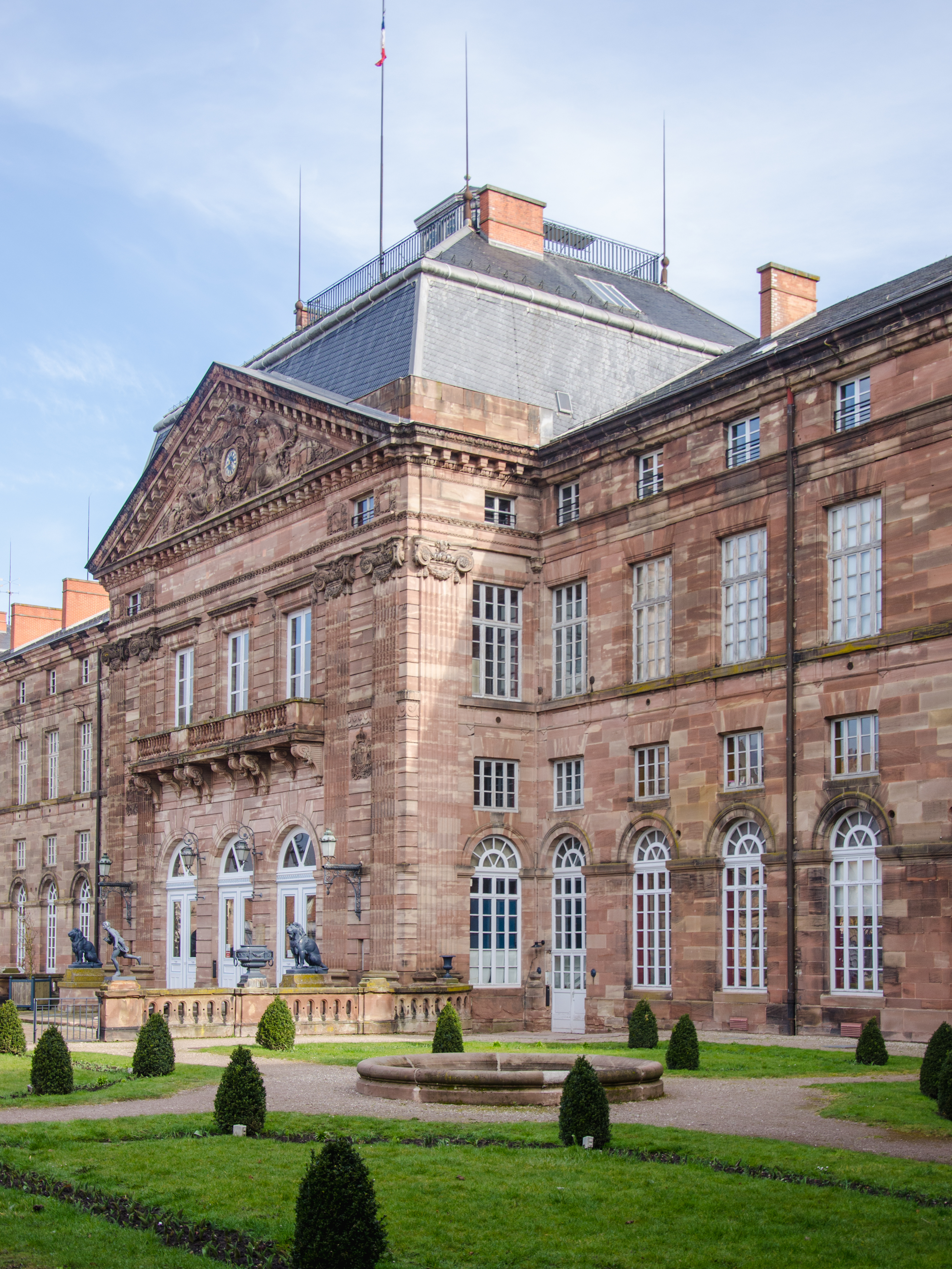
Another view of the entrance

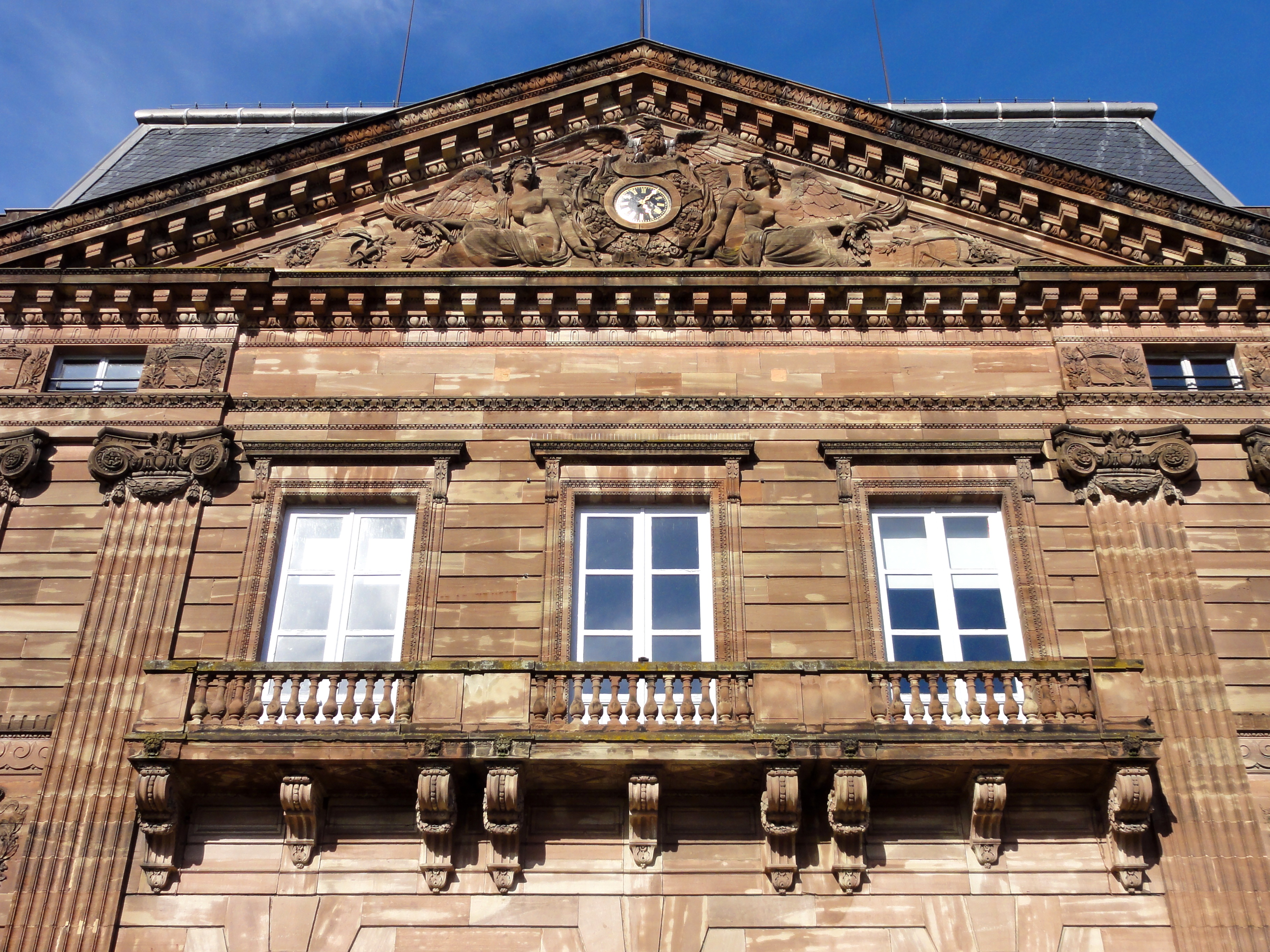
Details from the main entrance

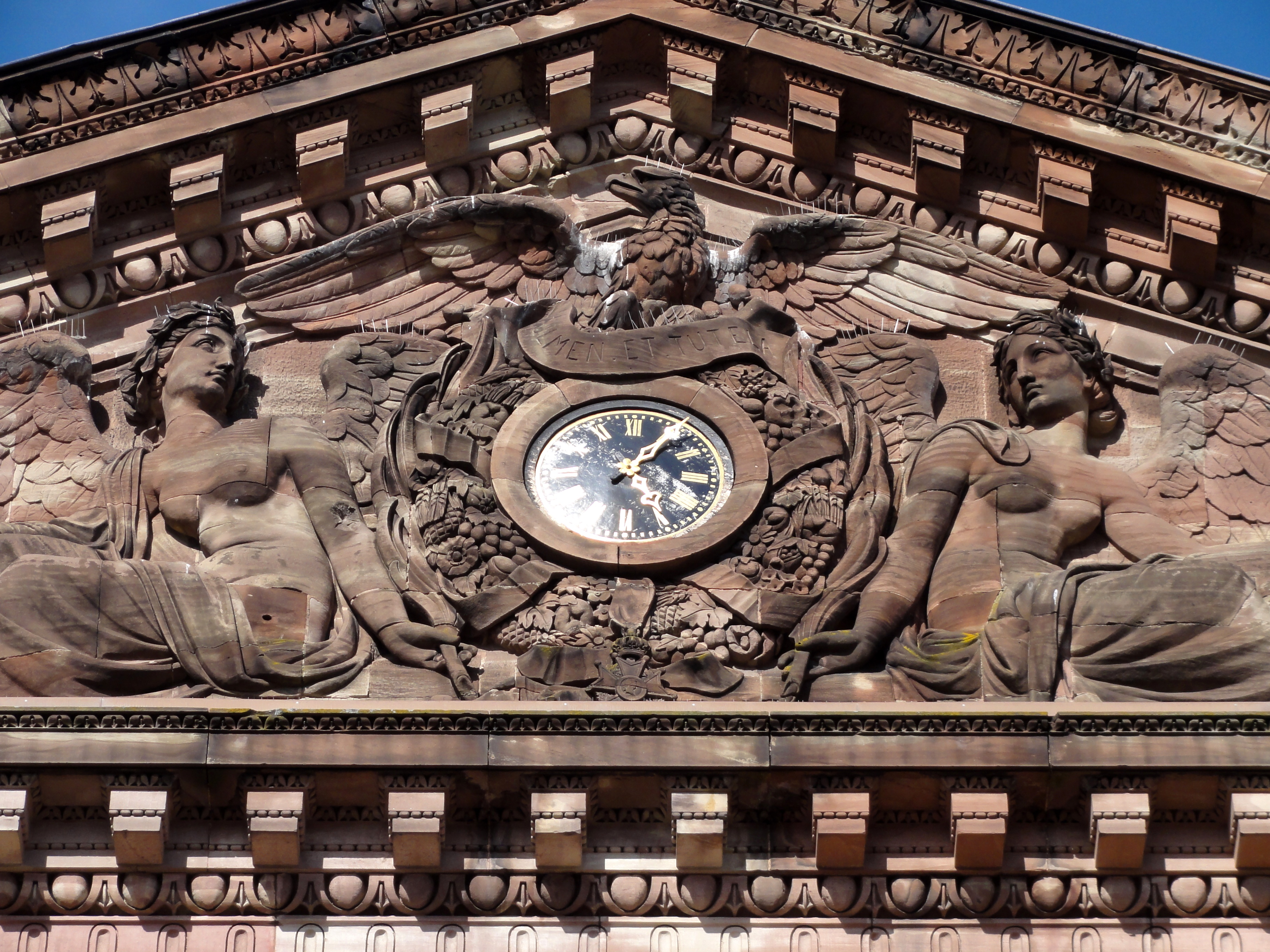
The clock above the entrance

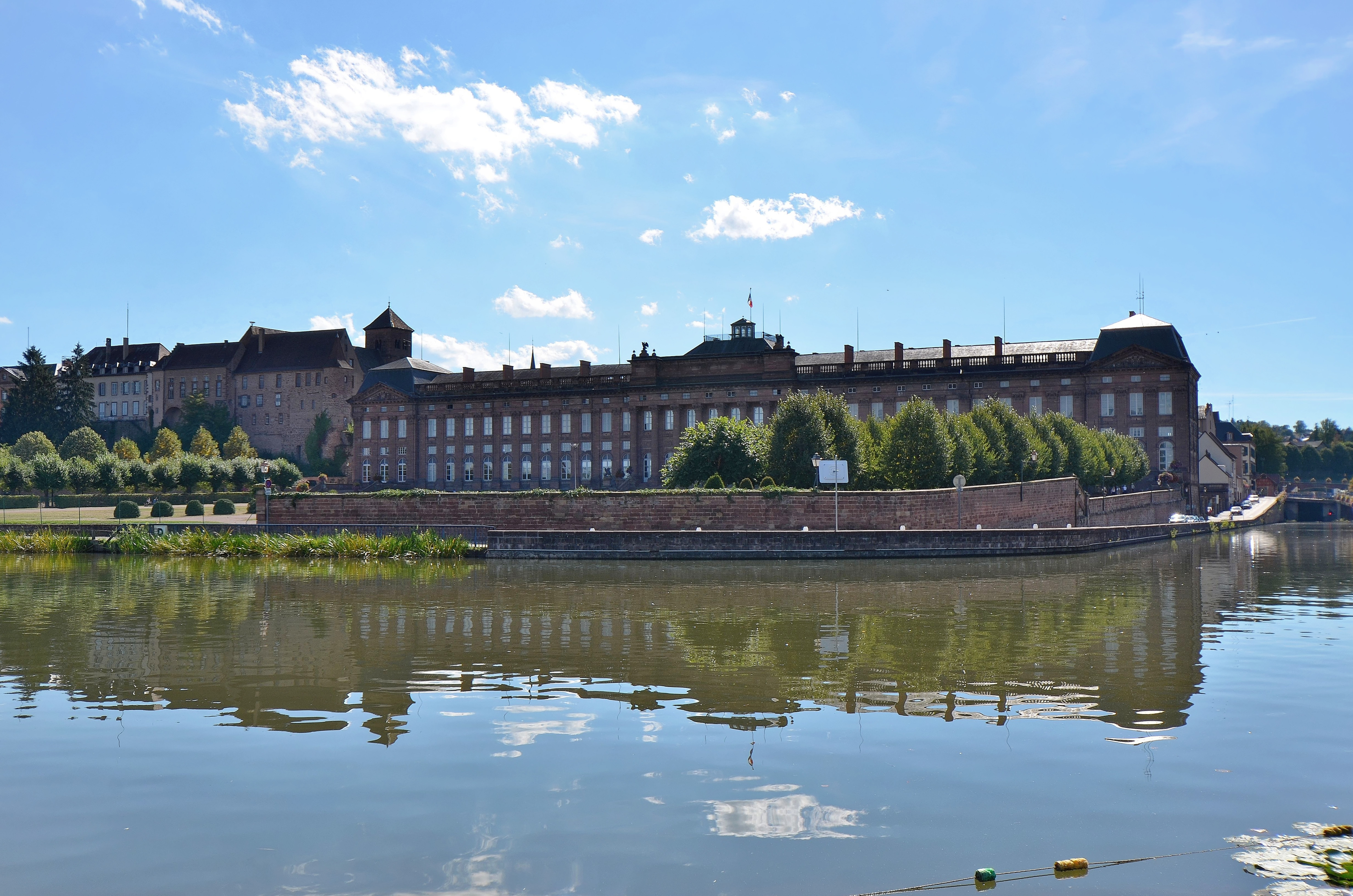
The palace with the old castle to the left and the Marne-Rhine canal in front

== Gardens ==
In front of the north-east wing built under Prince-Bishop Franz Egon von Fürstenberg-Heiligenberg, he had an initial park laid out, measuring approximately 600 × 700 meters. Prince-Bishop Armand I. Gaston Maximilien de Rohan-Soubise expanded the grounds from 1717 to 1733 on a grand scale: the central axis was formed by a 4 kilometres long, straight canal, which extended past Monsweiler to Steinburg. It was part of a complex system of locks, side canals for overflow, basins, and waterfalls and was fed by the Zorn River. About two-thirds along its course, there was a large circular lake, 260 meters in diameter, with an island in the center that housed a four-story Chinese teahouse built between 1783 and 1786. The architect was Nicolas Alexandre Salins de Montfort. South of the canal, a pheasantry covering several square kilometers was established towards Dettwiller, while to the north a wooded area with a hunting star was created.

Today, little of these landscape-defining elements remains, as they were largely built over in the 19th century. The enormous park was nationalized during the French Revolution. The grounds were divided into 180 parcels, which were sold.

Since 1853, the former park has been cut through by the Marne-Rhine Canal. When the palace was used as a widow's residence during the Second Empire, there was a garden that stretched from the palace to the Marne-Rhine Canal. When the military used the palace, the area served as a parade ground, and today it is used as an event space for the city, largely devoid of any horticultural elements.

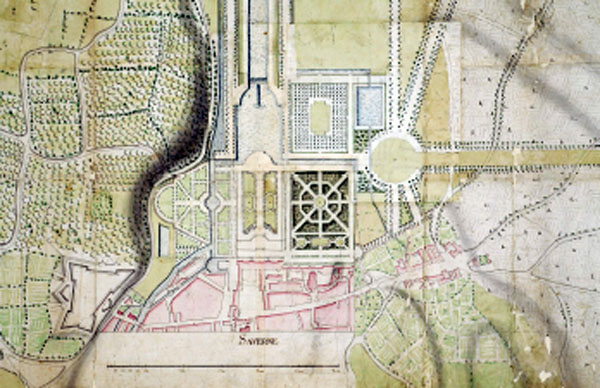
Plan of the gardens by Robert de Cotte around 1730

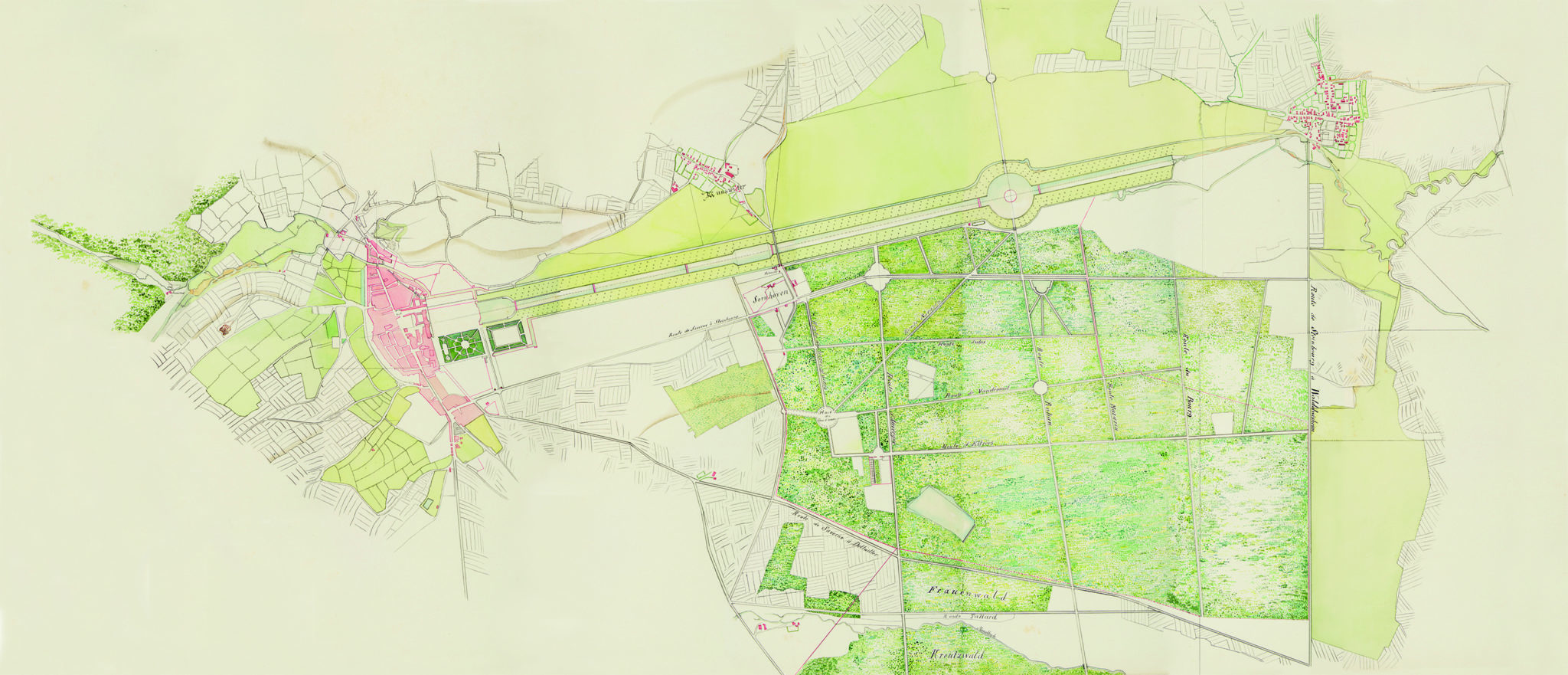
Plan of the gardens by Casimir Kolb around 1797

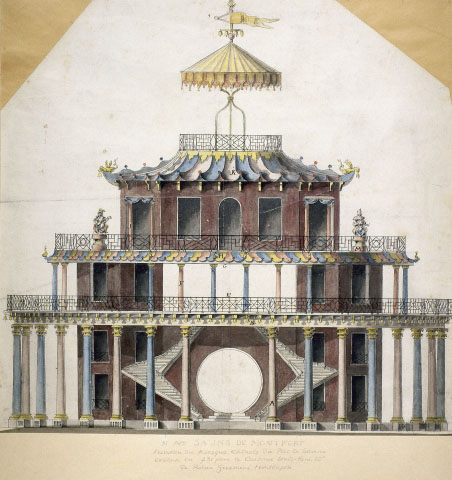
The Chinese teahouse - Design by Nicolas Salins de Montfort

== See also ==
- List of Baroque residences
- Municipal Museum (Saverne)

== Literature ==
- Gérard Denizeau, Larousse des châteaux, Larousse, 2005 ISBN 978-2035054838
- Gabrielle Feyler, « Le musée du Château des Rohan de Saverne », in Les Vosges : revue de tourisme, 2000, 2, p. 12-13
- Fischer, Dagobert (1867). "Notice historique sur le château impérial de Saverne". Revue d'Alsace. 18: 104–114, 156–168.
- Henri Heitz, Le Château de Saverne sous le Second Empire, Saverne, 1969
- Henri Heitz, « Petite promenade mythologique autour du château de Saverne », in Bulletin de la Société d'histoire et d'archéologie de Saverne et environs, 1983, No. 125, p. 7-8
- Henri Heitz, « Le château de Saverne », in Congrès archéologique de France, 2004 : Strasbourg et Basse -Alsace, Société française d'archéologie, Paris, 2006, p. 123-131
- Henri Heitz, « Que buvait-on à la cour du cardinal Louis René Édouard de Rohan ? : Les vins dans les caves du château de Saverne en 1790 », in Pays d'Alsace, 2008, No. 225, p. 29-30
- Jean-Daniel Ludmann, « Un document nouveau sur le château de Saverne au temps du premier cardinal de Rohan, l'inventaire de 1749 », in Bulletin de la Société d'histoire et d'archéologie de Saverne et environs, 1989, No. 147-148, p. 111-118
- Dany Muller (et al.), Le château des Rohan de Saverne, Éd. du Signe, Strasbourg, 2011, 46 p.
- Alphonse Wollbrett (dir.), Le Château de Saverne : études réunies, Société d'histoire et d'archéologie de Saverne et environs, Saverne, 1969, 129 p.
- Stéphane Xaysongkham, La maison du Cardinal Armand Gaston de Rohan : Officiers, domestiques et courtisans dans l'entourage du prince-évêque au château de Saverne (1704-1749), Société Savante d'Alsace, 2014, 255 p.
