= Municipal Museum (Saverne) =

Museum in Bas-Rhin, France

Coordinates: 48°44′32″N 7°21′48″E

Municipal museum
- Musée municipal
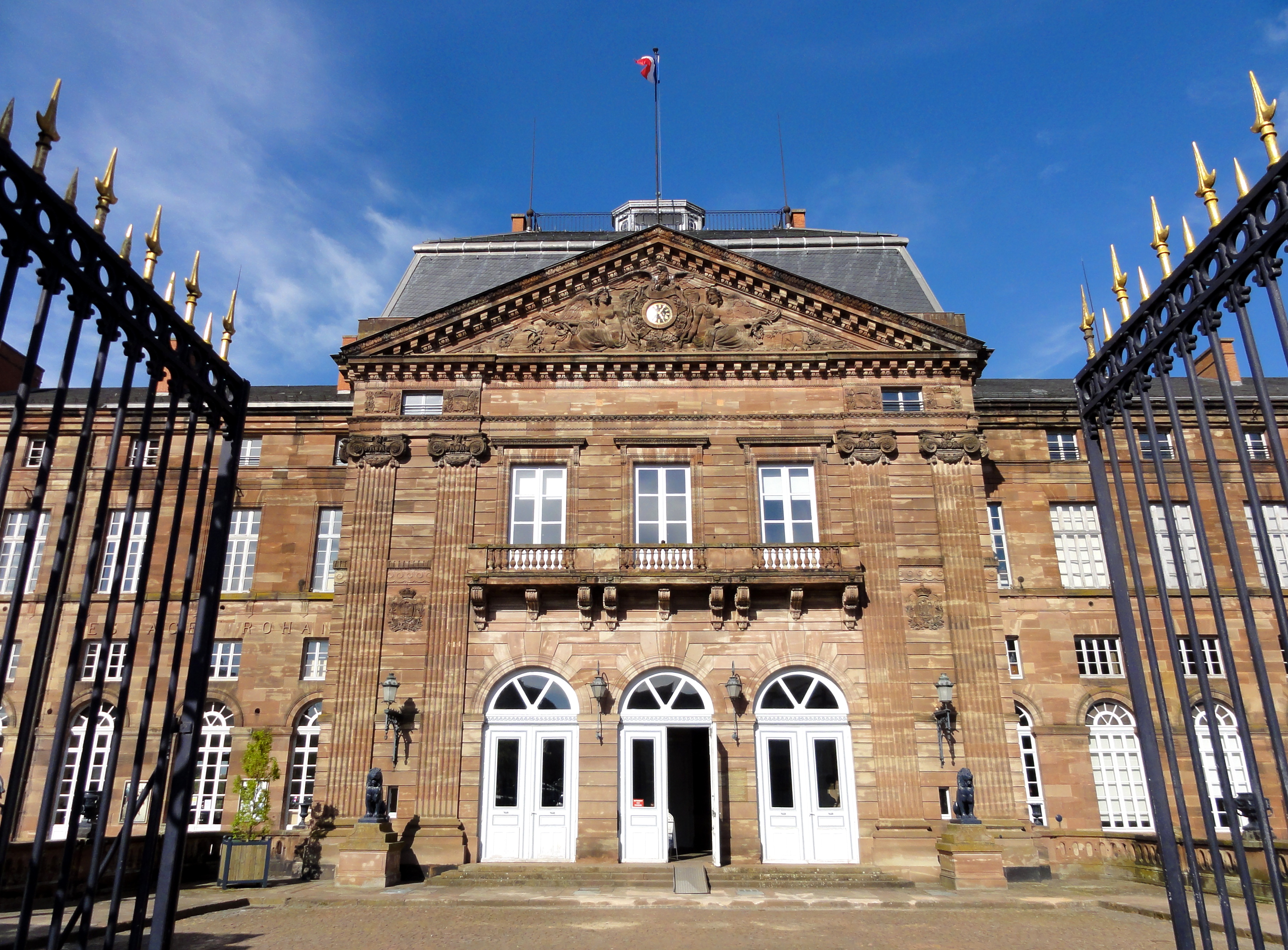
- Entrance of the museum
- Established: 1858
- Location: Saverne, France
- Collections: archaeology sculpture painting folk art history ethnography
- Website: www.saverne.fr/sport-culture/offre-culturelle/musee-de-saverne/

The municipal museum of Saverne, a small town in the Bas-Rhin department of France, is the oldest museum in the historic Alsace region outside of Strasbourg and Colmar, having been founded in 1858. It is located in the former Rohan Castle since 1952.

The museum is divided into three sections. The archaeological department in the vaulted basement is dedicated to the Gallo-Roman and Imperial Roman past of the antique Tres Tabernæ and its surroundings.

The art and history department on the second floor is dedicated to the history of the castle and of the town, to local and regional costumes and folk art, and to sculptures from churches and chapels of Saverne and its periphery. Thanks to bequests made by the family of Alfred Philippe Roll between 1952 and 1965, the Saverne museum owns nearly 50 works by that French painter, among which a monumental portrait – 286 cm (113 in) by 197 cm (78 in) – of his son on horseback.

A third department is dedicated to the donation Louise Weiss. Apart from personal and historical documents, and furniture, the collections assembled and bequeathed by the author, journalist, feminist, and politician of Alsatian descent comprises works of folk art from Cambodia, China, Ethiopia, Morocco, Russia, Sudan, and several other countries across the globe, as well as decorative arts, drawings, paintings by Western European artists such as Daum, Raoul Dufy, Maurice de Vlaminck, and Kees van Dongen. The Louise Weiss section of the museum was created in 1983 and is presented in its current form since 1996.

== Gallery ==
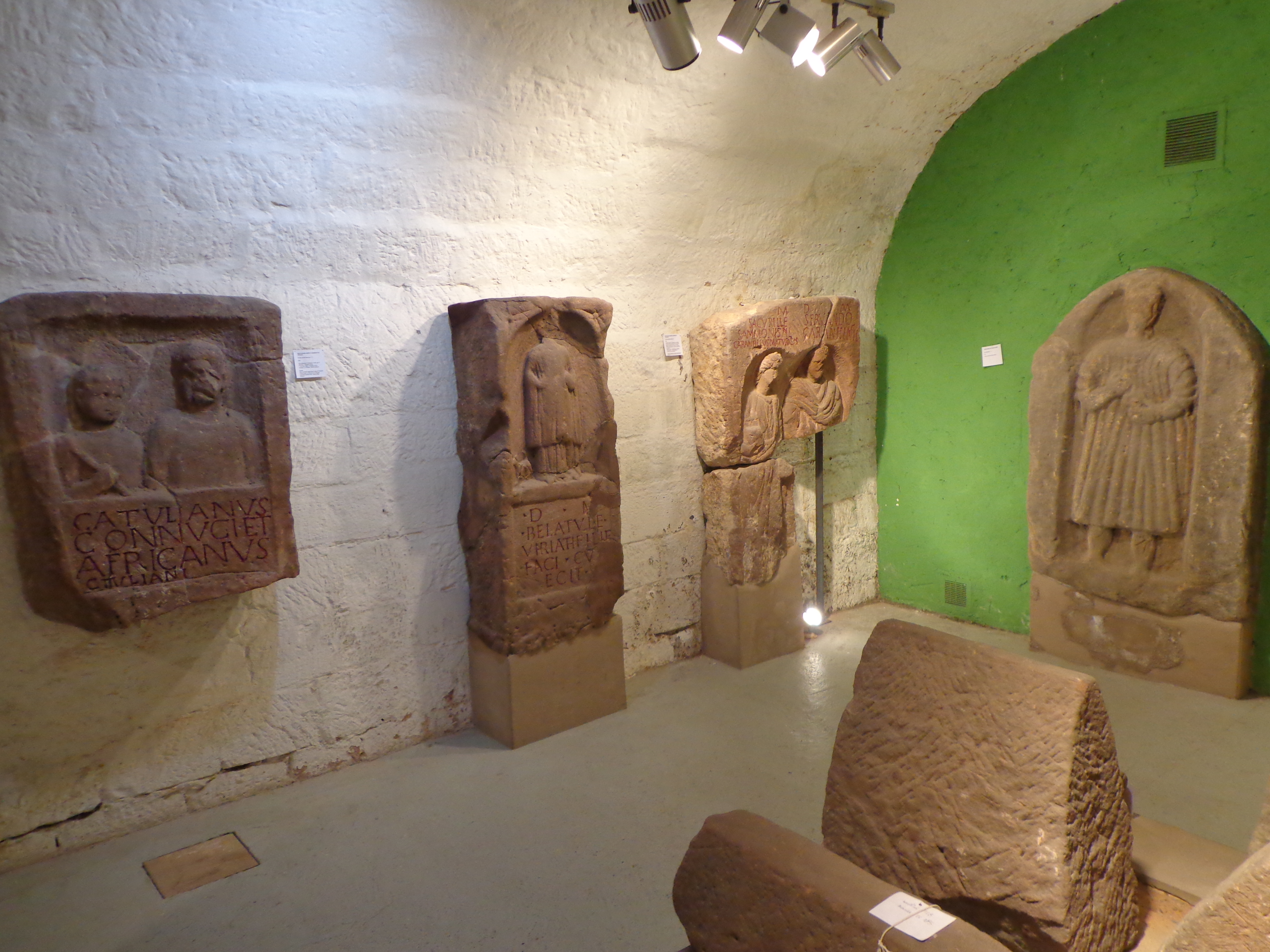
A view of the archaeological section

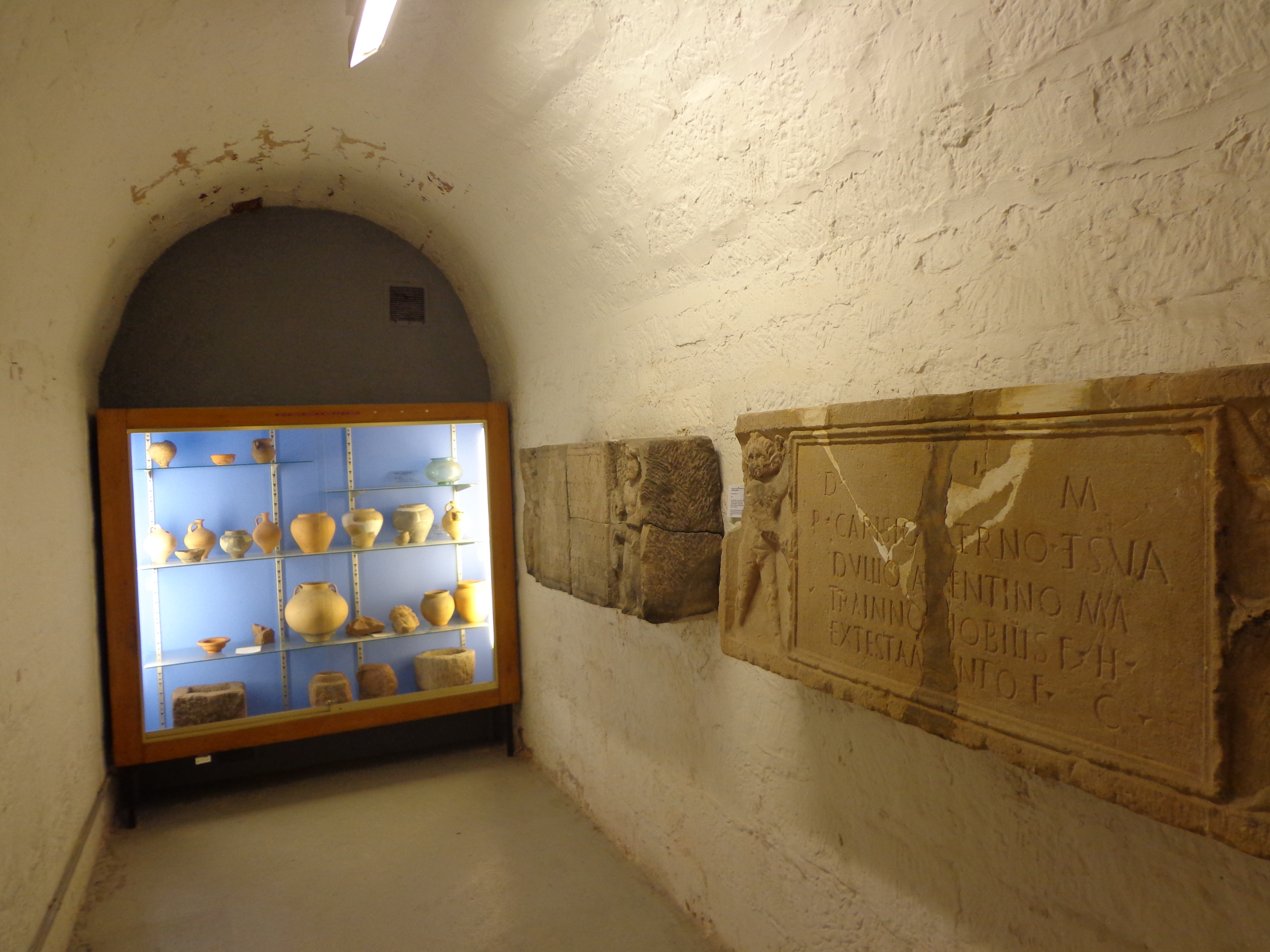
A view of the archaeological section

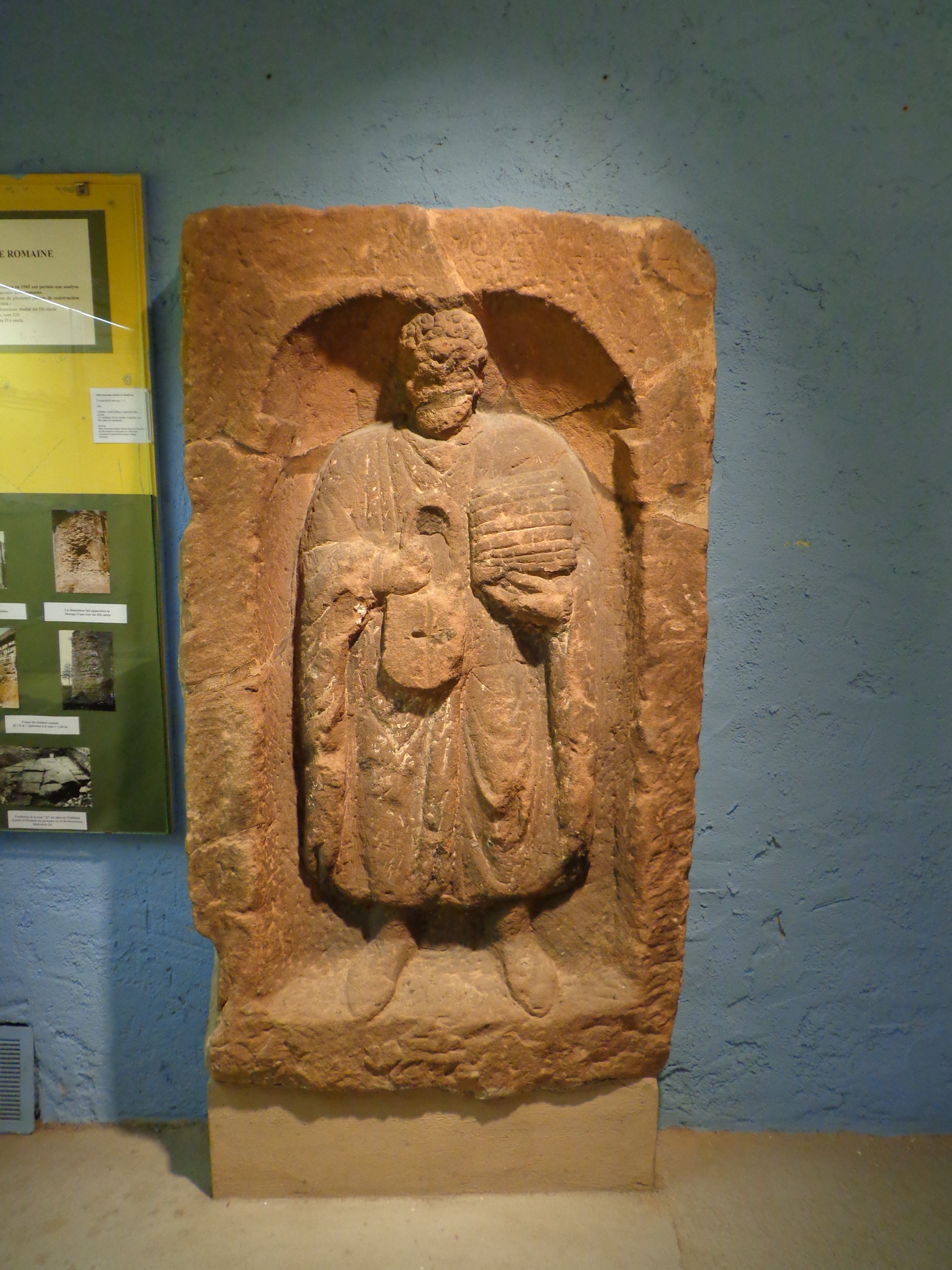
Stele of Catullinus in the archaeological section

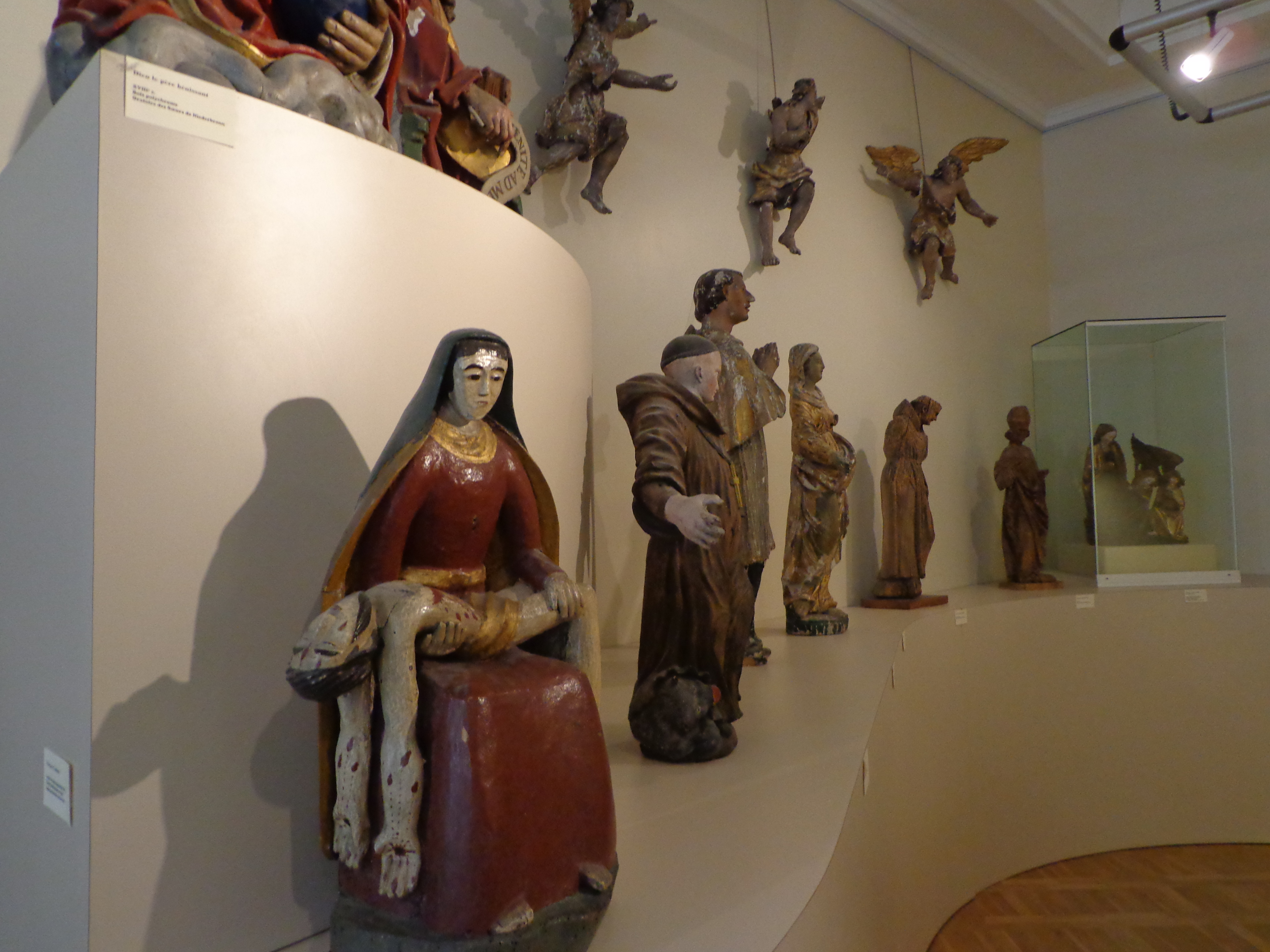
Christian statuary in the art and history section

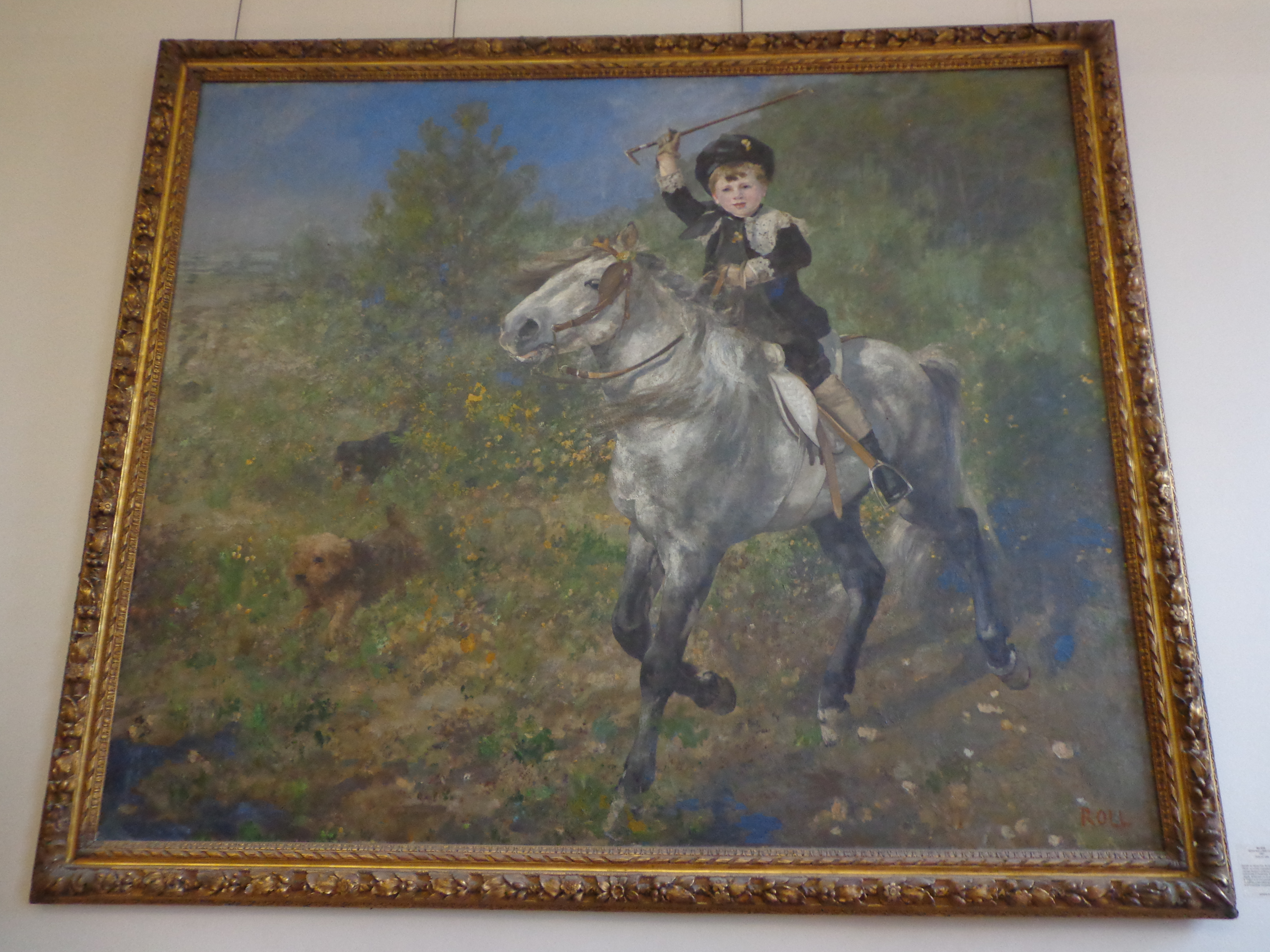
Au Trot, by Alfred Philippe Roll (1888)

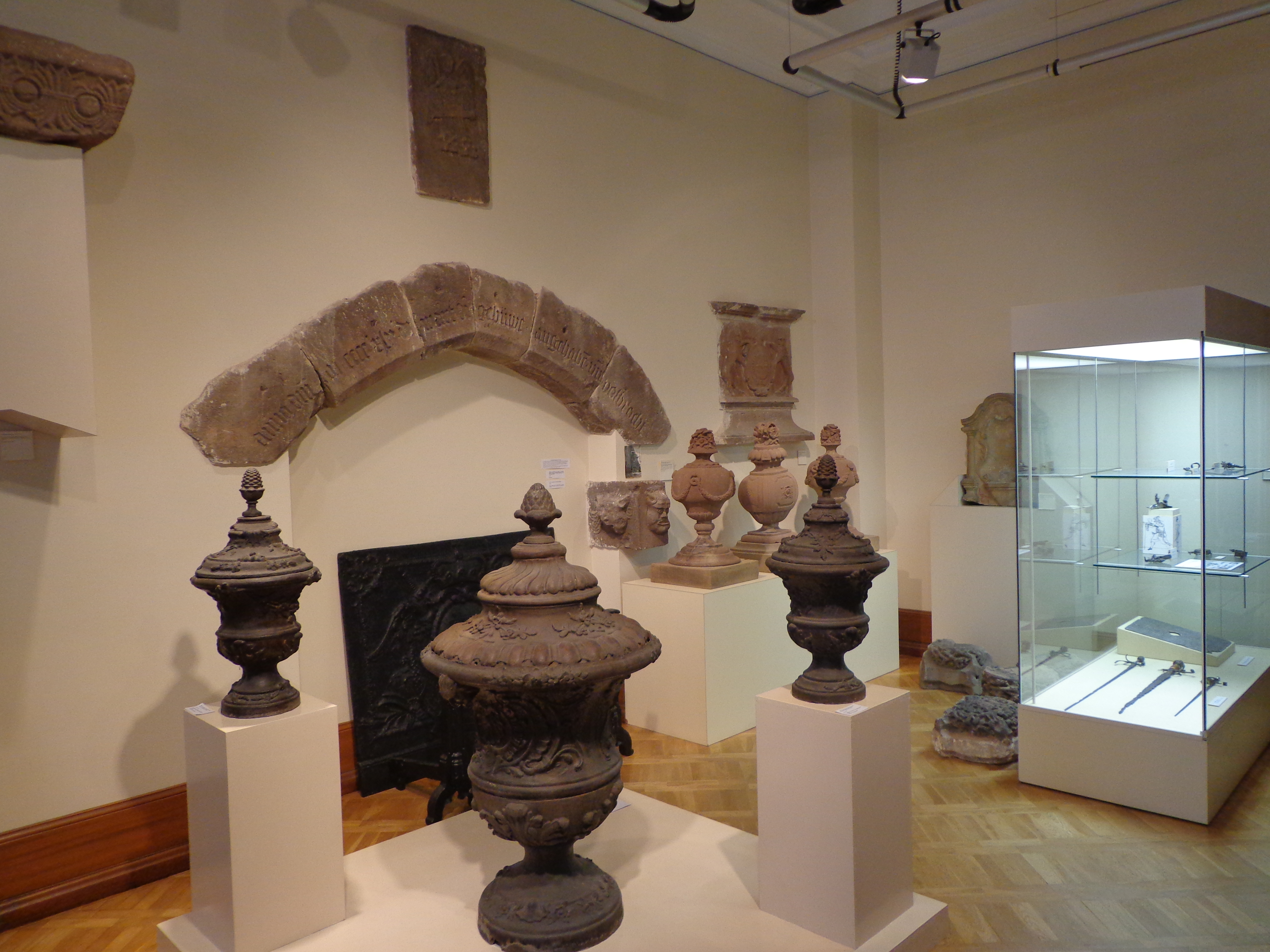
Fragments from the castle and other buildings in the art and history section

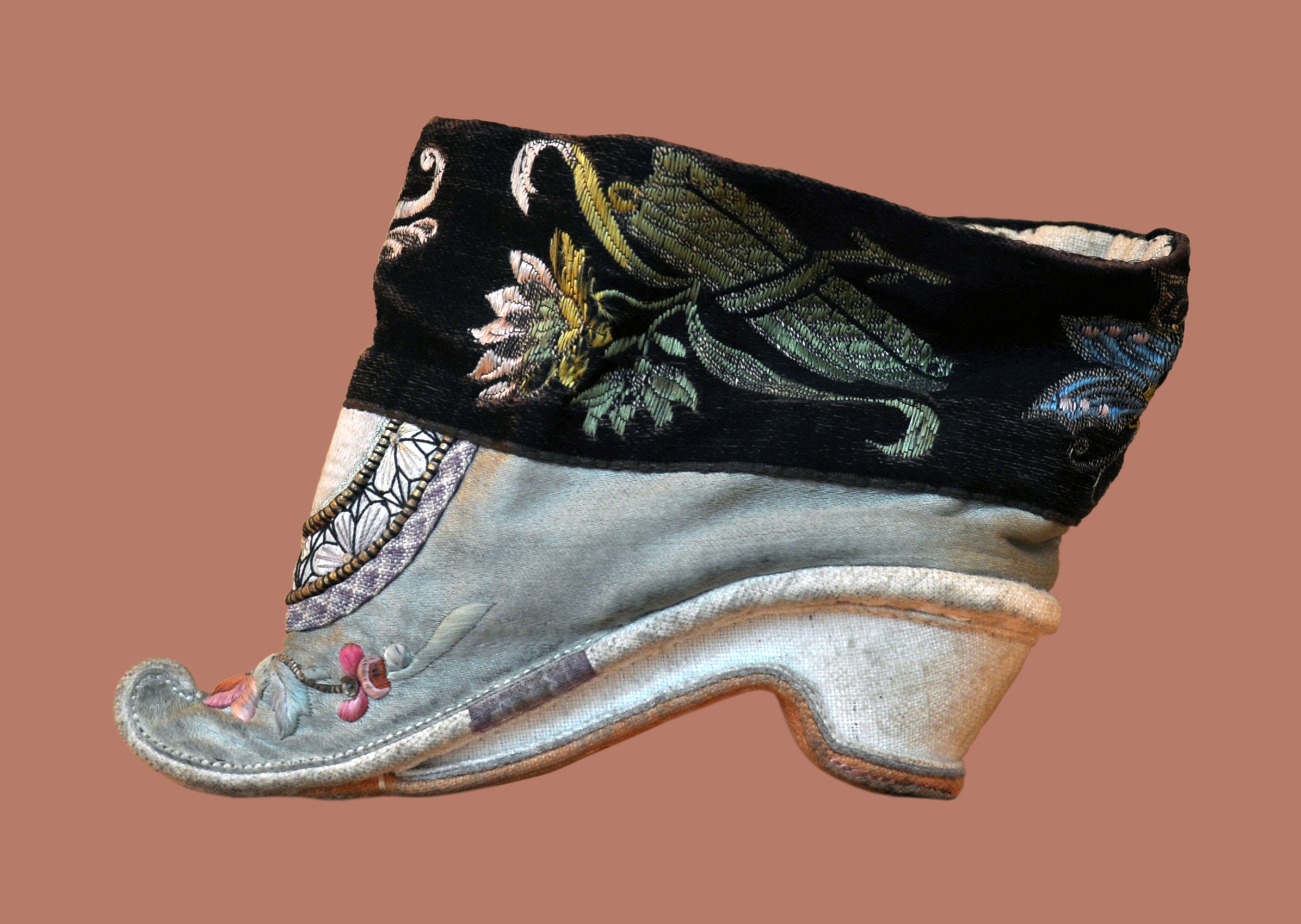
18th-century Chinese shoe for bound foot in the Louise Weiss section
