= Oberhof (château) =

Castle in Saverne, France

Coordinates: 48.7415°N 7.3642°E

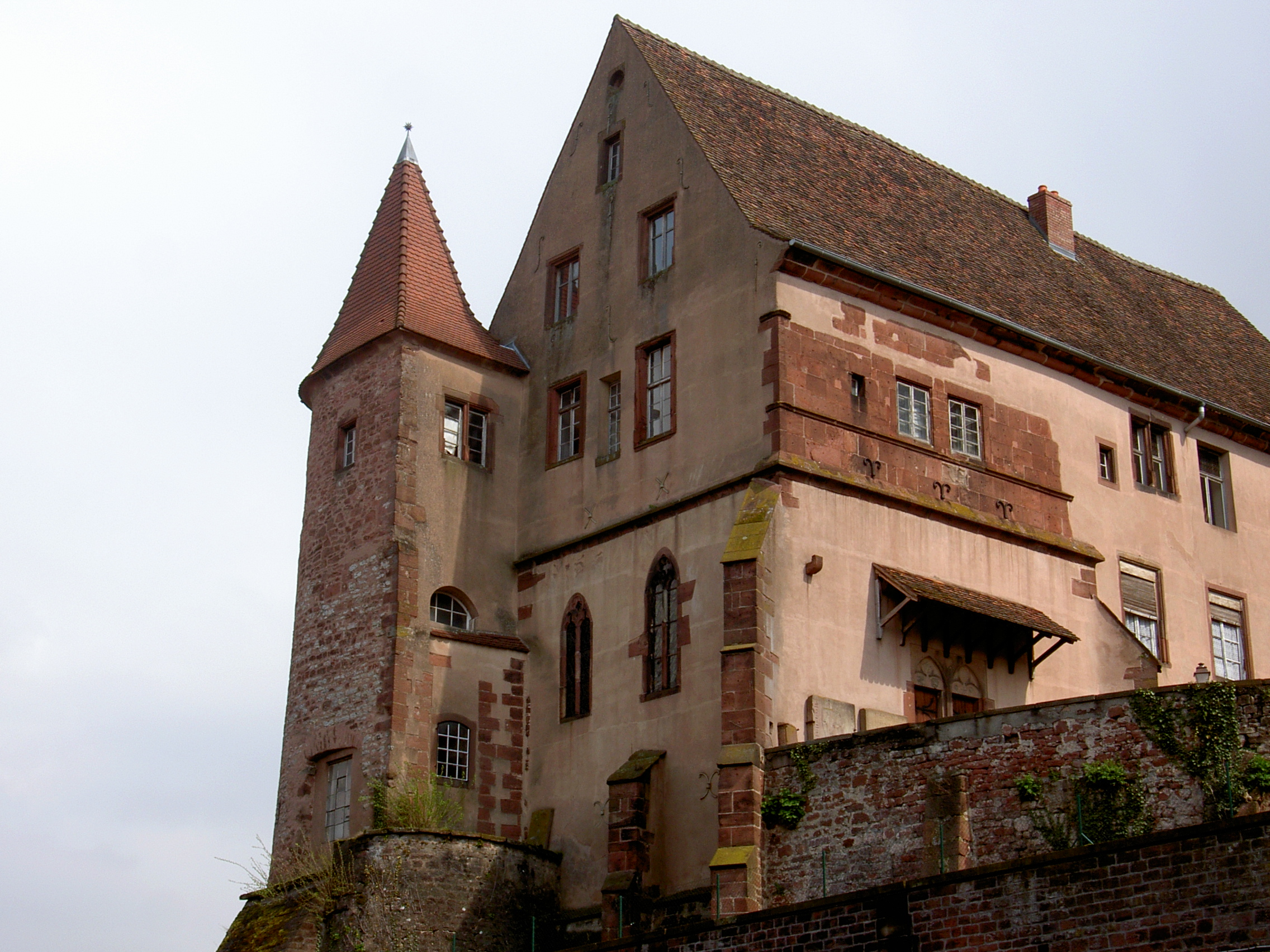

The Château d'Oberhof is a castle situated in the commune of Saverne in the département of Bas-Rhin. It was mentioned in 1417 as the residence of the bishop of Strasbourg. Since 1852, it houses the sous-préfecture of the arrondissement of Saverne. It is a listed historical monument since 1934.
