= Château d'Ochsenstein =

Ruined castle in Bas-Rhin, France

Château d’Ochsenstein (Ochsenstein Castle)
- Reinhardsmunster, Bas-Rhin, France
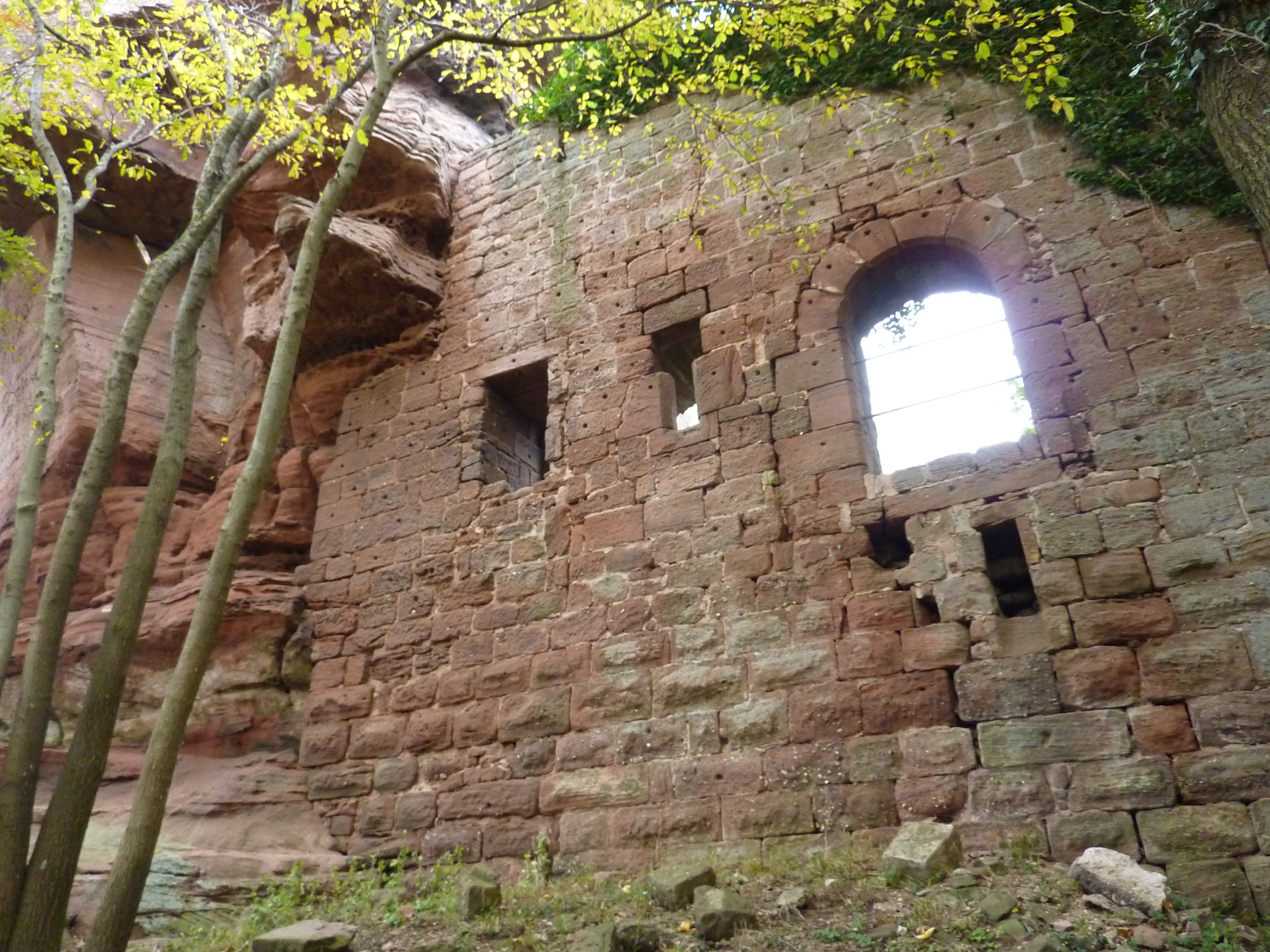
- Exterior of south wall

Site information
- Type: Castle
- Condition: Classified as a Historical Monument (1898)

Location
- Coordinates: 48.6828°N 7.2998°E

Site history
- Built: 13th–16th centuries

The Château d'Ochsenstein is a ruined castle located in the commune of Reinhardsmunster, in the Bas-Rhin département of France. It was home to the Ochsensteins, a powerful family from medieval Alsace. The castle sits upon three sandstone spurs and comprises three separate castles: le Grand Ochsenstein, le Petit Ochsenstein and a third building, thought to be called le Château de Wachelheim.

Ochsenstein castle has been classified as a monument historique by the French Ministry of Culture since 1898.

== Geographical location ==
=== Position ===
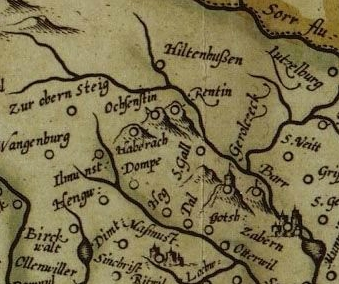
Ochsenstein on Mercator's 16th-century map

The Château d'Ochsenstein is located in the heart of the Forêt domaniale (national forest) of Saverne and occupies the southern end of the Schlossberg mountain, at a height of 584 metres. The ruins tower above the glade and the Haberacker Forest House (altitude: 476 metres). The site is surrounded by steep slopes, except to the north of the Schlossberg summit plateau where the terrain is flat. The castle overlooks an old strategic passageway, which rises from the Alsace plain and Reinhardsmunster through the Mosselthal valley, to reach the Baerenbach valley, the Stambach Annex, and which finally reaches Lutzelbourg, and Phalsbourg in Lorraine.

=== Access ===
From Saverne, the castle may be accessed by car along the D171 road, then the forest road which passes le Schaeferplatz as far as the Haberacker farms. A forest path marked by a blue rectangle (GR 531) leads to the castle, about 20 minutes away and roughly 110 metres above.

=== Local area ===
The castle ruins are located:

- 7 km south west of Saverne;
- 1,5 km west north west of Reinhardsmunster;
- 5 km west of Marmoutier;
- 6 km north east of Dabo in Moselle;
- 500 m above the isolated farms of Haberacker;
- 1 km north west of the "Billebaum" crossroads.

== History ==
The history of the House of Ochsenstein can be found in the French Wikipedia article Ochsenstein. This section details events linked to the castle in particular.

=== The rise of the Ochsensteins ===
The Ochsensteins coat of arms

==== The construction and origins of the House of Ochsenstein ====
The castle is thought to have been built in the late 12th century. It is part of a chain of Vosges castles near Saverne which were built to defend the passage from the Alsace plain to Lorraine. The Fiefdom of Ochsenstein was carved out of the lands of the Marmoutier Abbey by the Bishops of Metz.

The first recorded mention of a Lord of Ochsenstein is in 1187: Bourcard Ochsenstein signed a charter by Frederick Barbarossa (Frederick I, Holy Roman Emperor) confirming his possessions to the Koenigsbruck Abbey. Therefore, the castle must have already been in existence as the custom at the time was that descendants took their surname from the name of their castle.

==== The succession of Otto I ====
When he became ill in 1217, Otto I shared his land among his sons. Two of them entered the clergy and the other three inherited the castles. Otto II, the eldest, received Ochsenstein Castle - known then as ‘der Fels’ (the rock); the service of the knights who guarded it (the Burgmänner); the mountain on which it is built; and some nearby farms. The second son, Eberhard, received the Château de Wachelheim: this castle was probably the one that was built on the third stone spur. Conrad, the third son, received the Château de Greifenstein but had to recognise the usufruct of the nobles who occupied it. Otto I survived his illness and lived until 1241. At that point, his children inherited his legacy according to the plans he had laid out in 1217.

=== House of Habsburg ===
==== Alliance with the Habsburgs ====
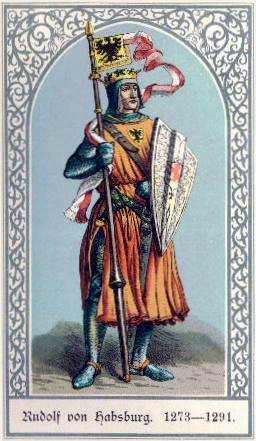
Rodolphe of Habsburg

Otto III, the son of Otto II, married Cunégonde of Habsburg. She was the sister of Rudolph of Habsburg who was elected King of the Romans in 1273. The Ochsenstein home thus gained great influence and the castle became the centre of a large Fiefdom that included Marlenheim and Barr (1321).

Otto IV, son of Otto III, remained loyal to Rodolphe of Habsburg, accompanying him in his military campaigns. As a reward for this loyalty, Rodolphe appointed him landvogt of Alsace and Breisgau (a provincial bailiff). Otto IV’s zeal and his growing influence caused him to make many enemies, including the Bishop of Strasbourg, Conrad of Lichtenberg, and Guillaume III of Hohenstein.

==== The destruction of the Petit Ochsenstein ====
In 1284, Guillaume of Hohenstein captured the Château d'Échéry (or Eckerich) from Frederick III, Duke of Lorraine. Otto IV tried to restore the castle to the Duke.In his absence, Guillaume of Hohenstein and the Bishop of Strasbourg attacked Ochsenstein. The Burgmänner who defended it were hunted and the castle was destroyed (most likely burned). It is probably the Petit Ochsenstein which was destroyed but it was quickly rebuilt by Otto VI.

=== The Decline of the Ochsensteins and the castle's importance ===
==== The progressive estrangement of the castle ====
The Lords of Ochsenstein did not always live in their castles: Otto IV lived mostly in Haguenau Palace, the residence of the Landvogt. Otto V, appointed Landvogt of Alsace and Speyergau when the Habsburgs returned to power, lived in Landau.

The Ochsensteins owned another residence in Strasbourg since 1259. It stood in the current Rue Brulée ("burnt street"), which was named after Ochsensteinergasse and occupied part of the current Town Hall site. The Burgmänner who had guarded the Châteaux d'Ochsenstein no longer lived there. The castle was used by the Ochsensteins as collateral for loans (around 1400, Otto VII hired out his castles for a thousand florins).

==== Another destruction of the Petit Ochsenstein ====
The Ochsenstein decline began in the late 14th century. Rudolph II led many conflicts including one which caused the city of Strasbourg to besiege the castle in 1382. Once conquered, a small garrison was added, but then the castle staff was cut as their maintenance was deemed too expensive. Trendel, like Lehmann, assumes this happened in the Petit Ochsenstein castle.

Whichever it was, the castle had been rebuilt when, in 1403, Frédéric of Ochsenstein signed an agreement with his brothers on the sharing of the Ochsenstein castles’ maintenance costs. It mentions that they should contribute to the expenses concerning "the three castles" if they wanted to come and live there.

==== The sharing of the castle ====
Like his father, Frédéric was involved in many conflicts, notably with the Margrave of Baden. Frédéric was obliged to give him half of the Château d'Ochsenstein in 1411 after an arbitration which was conducted by his stepfather, Hanemann II, Count of Deux-Ponts-Bitche. One clause provided for the return of the entire castle to Frédéric in case of the Margrave’s death. However, Frédéric died first, on 17 October 1411, without an heir. His brother, Volmar, inherited the castle and left holy orders to start a family.

This did not affect the tensions between the Ochsensteins and the Margrave of Baden. Hence, Volmar was forced to give up half of the Château d'Ochsenstein on 11 November 1411. Volmar tried to fight against its influence by Louis IV of Lichtenberg the right to his castle, but he also had to give this right to the Margrave and his sons in 1417. In addition, to help his brother, Jean, to become provost of the general chapter of Strasbourg, Volmar yielded to the bishop of Strasbourg, Guillaume II of Diest, half of the castle.

=== The post-Ochsenstein period and demolition ===
==== The legacy is passed to the Deux-Ponts-Bitches ====
Georges of Ochsnstein, who succeeded his father, Volmar, in 1426, also came into many conflicts. The ransoms he had to collect when he was captured contributed to the ruin of his home. In 1485 after he died, it was his sister Cunegonde, the wife of Henry I of Deux-Ponts-Bitche, who inherited the estate. Guillaume de Ribeaupierre attempted to challenge this legacy by arguing that the Ochsenstein legacy was "masculine" and could not fall to a woman. Henry obtained the backing of the Bishop of Metz for three years (1487 -1490]), before the bishop retracted it.

==== Successive repurchasing and reconstruction ====
Economic problems led George de Deux-Ponts-Bitche to mortgage the castle with Ulric of Rathsamhausen-zum-Stein for a value of 2800 florins. The castle was then passed to Sébastien de Landsberg who had received a dowry from his wife, Anne of Rathsamhausen; the couple settled in the castle in 1527 although it is described as being dilapidated.

In 1555, Jacques de Deux-Ponts-Bitche redeemed the Landsberg’s mortgage. Four years later, when receiving the oath of allegiance of the subjects of the lordship of Ochsenstein, he launched the renovation work (it is likely that the castle was adapted to accommodate firearms at this time). However, in 1559, whilst he was preparing to live there, a fire consumed the castle, reducing it to ruins.

==== Demolition ====
Philip V, Count of Hanau-Lichtenberg, inherited the ruined castle after Jacques’ death in 1570; the Linange-Wesburg family protested and it was only in 1691 that a compromise was reached. In the 18th century, the castle’s stones were used to build a hunting lodge near the Haberacker farm; it has since been in a state of collapse.

== Architecture ==
=== Map of the Grand Ochsenstein ===
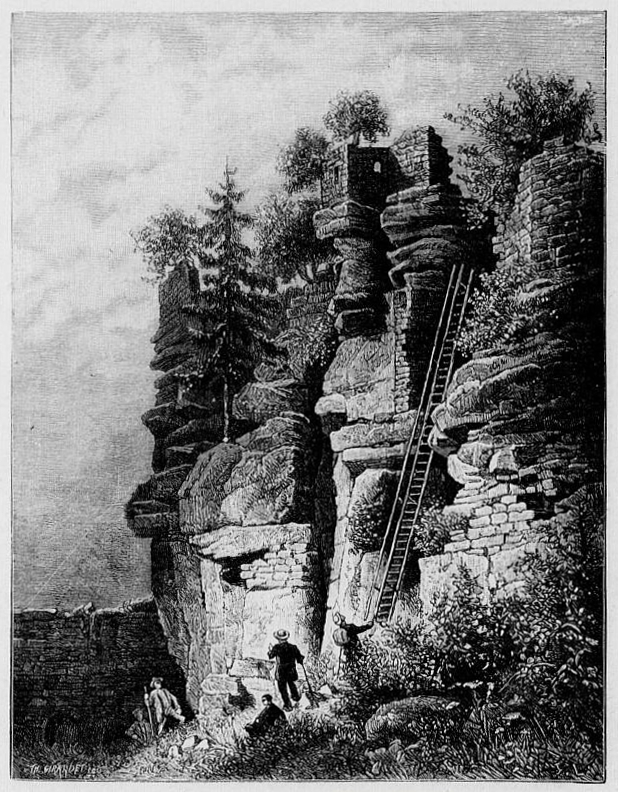
Le Grand Ochsenstein at the end of the 19th century

N°	Name
1	South Wall
2	Modern Entrance
3	Lower Court
4	Stairs
5	East Tower
6	Corps-de-garde
7	Trench and access to the Petit Ochsenstein
8	Kitchen
9	North Building
10	Keep
11	Chapel
12	Large Corridor
13	Polygonal Room
14	Filter Tank

Parts that are still visible:

- The ruins of the polygonal room, the polygonal chapel, the lower court and the semicircular firearms tower at the Grand-Ochsenstein
- Some relics of the fortifications at the Petit-Ochsenstein
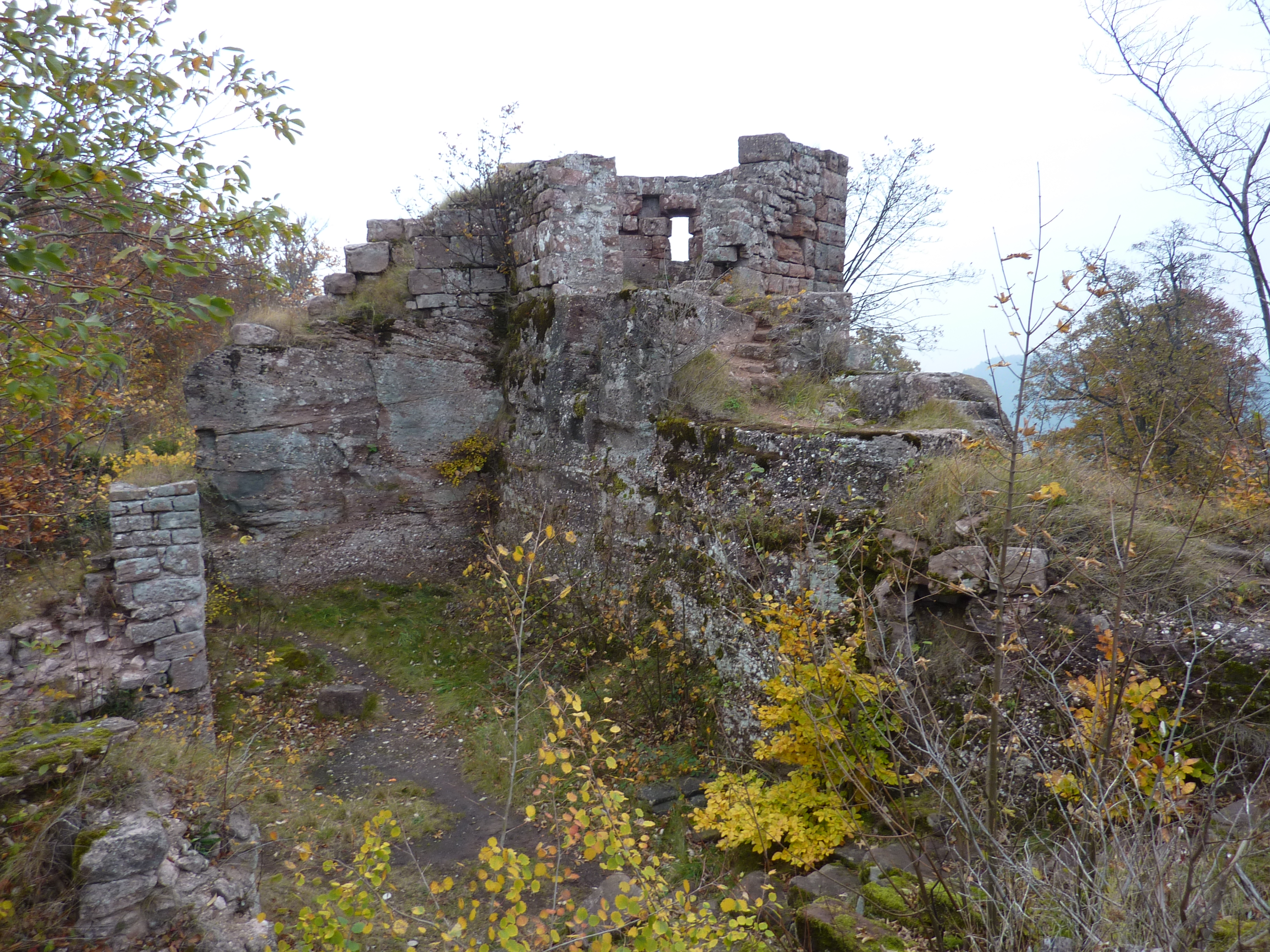
Logis and chapel

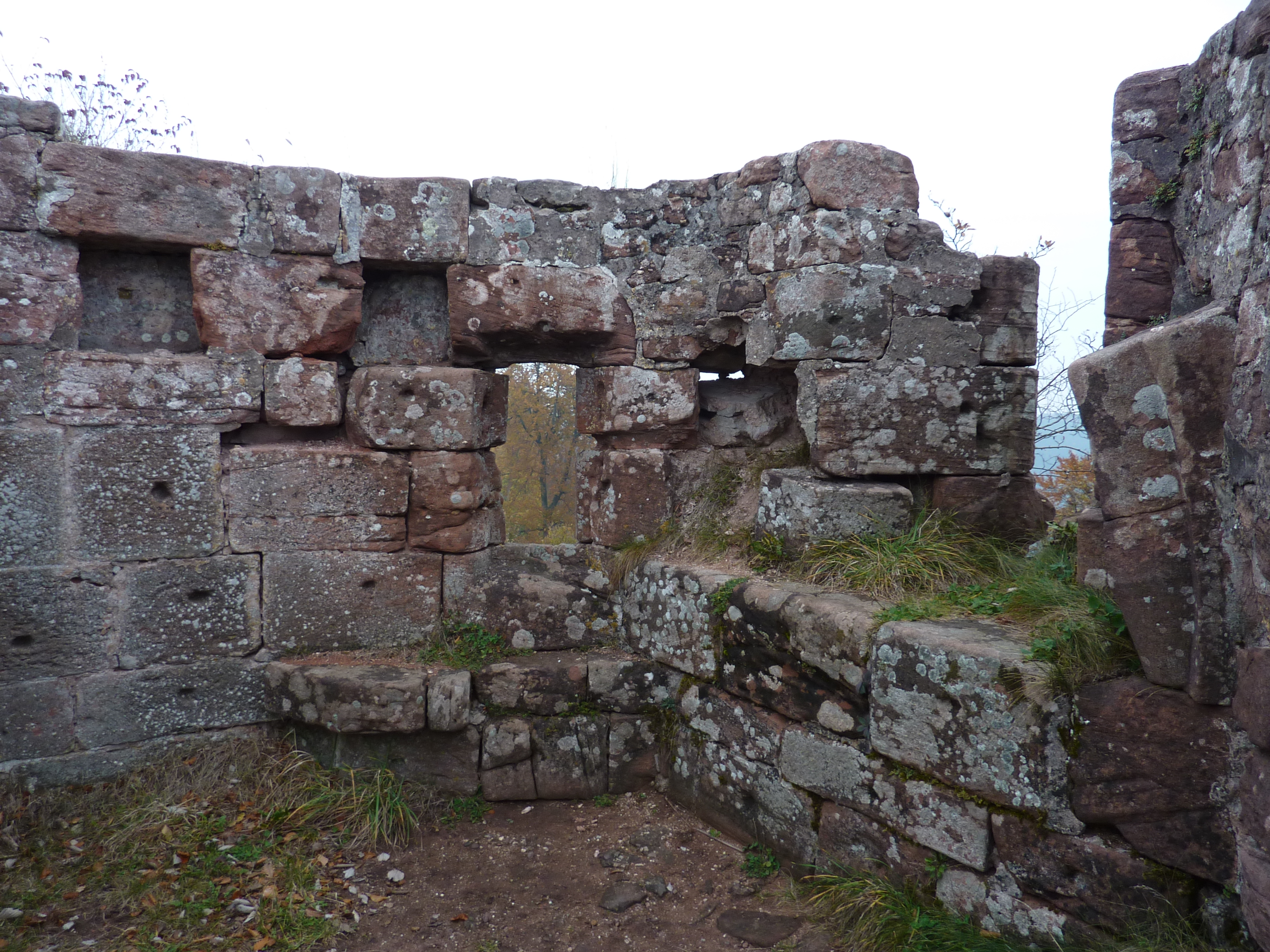
Interior of the chapel

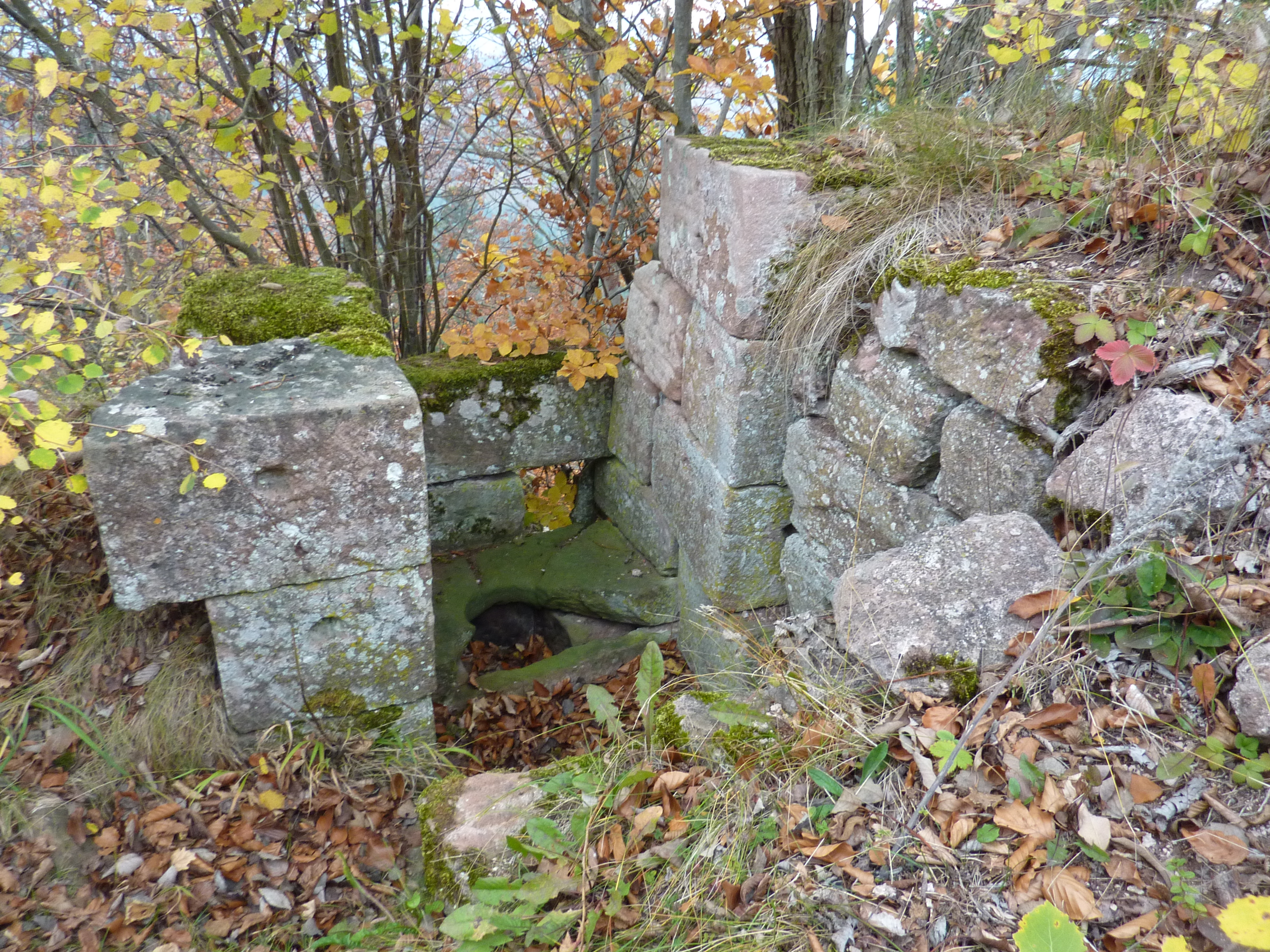
Latrines

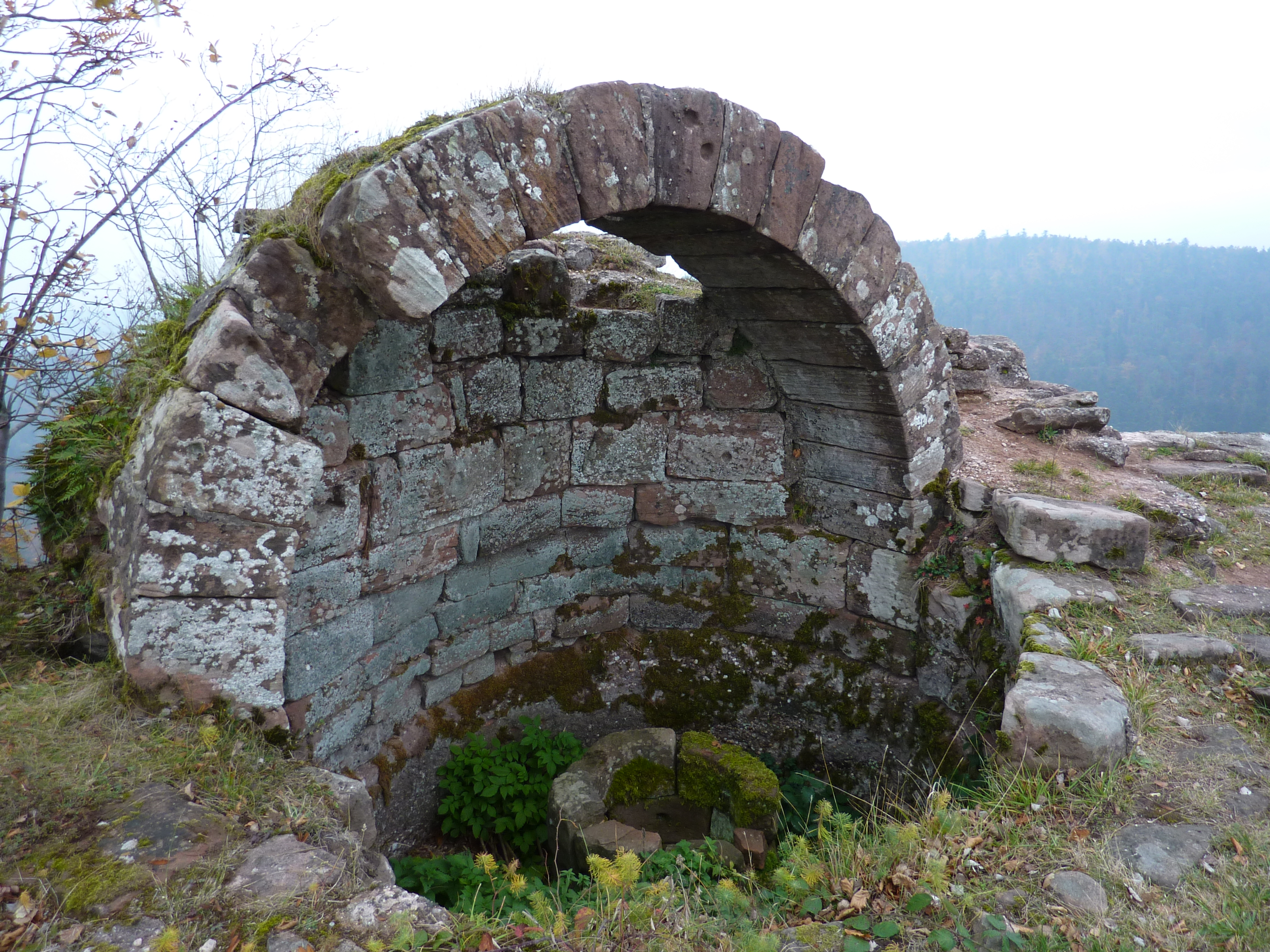
Cistern
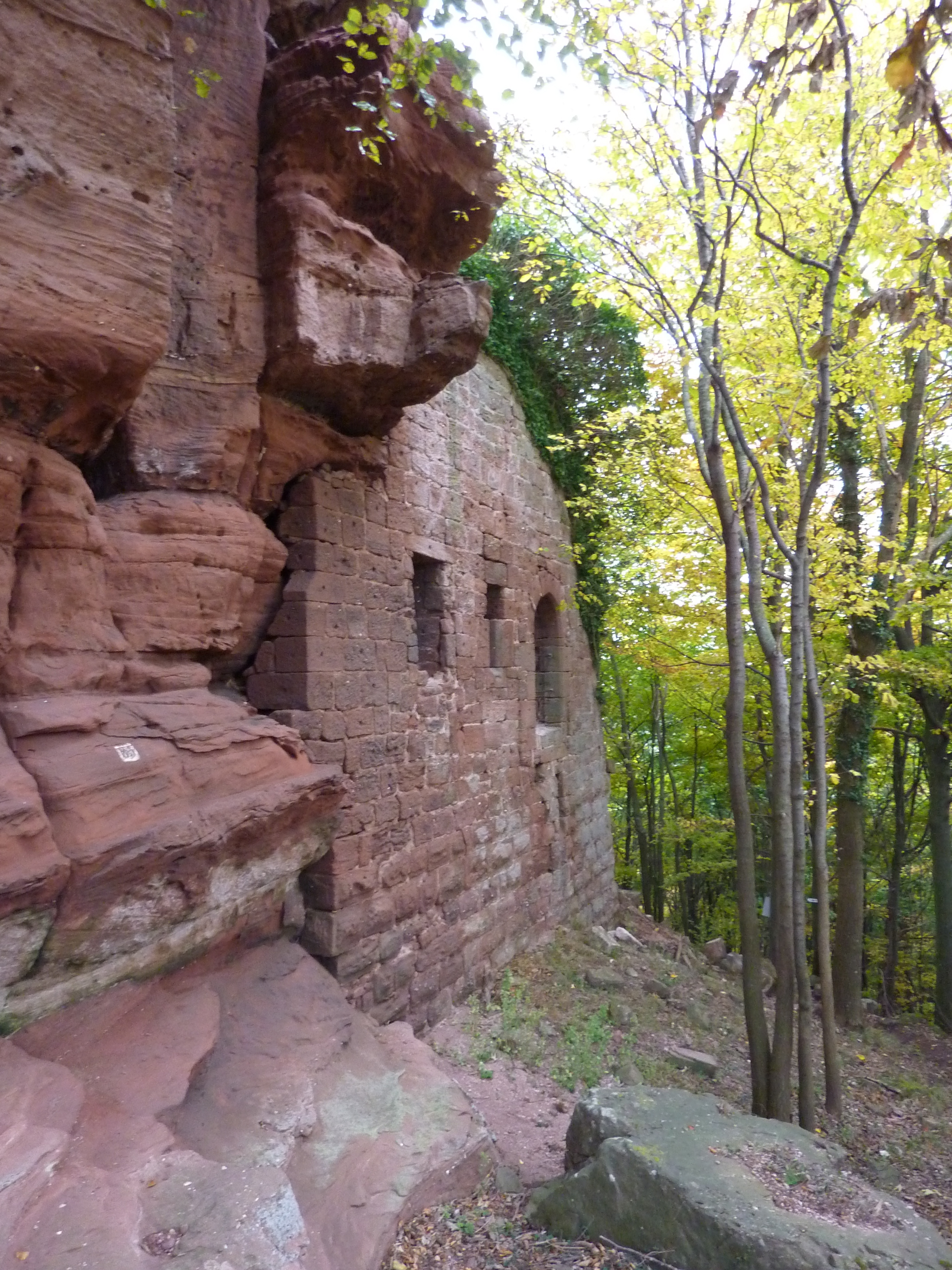
South wall of courtyard from outside

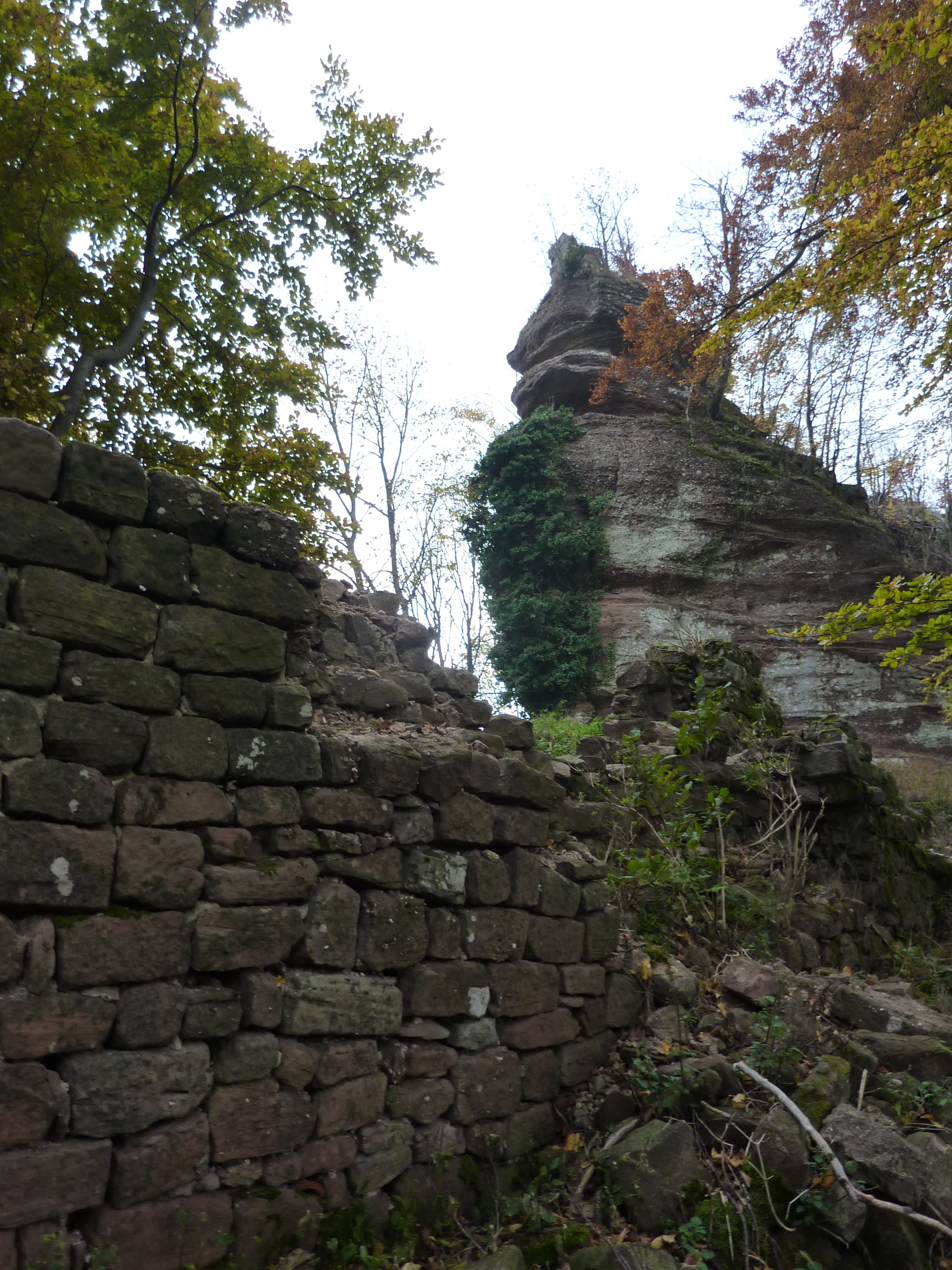
Keep from the north of the courtyard

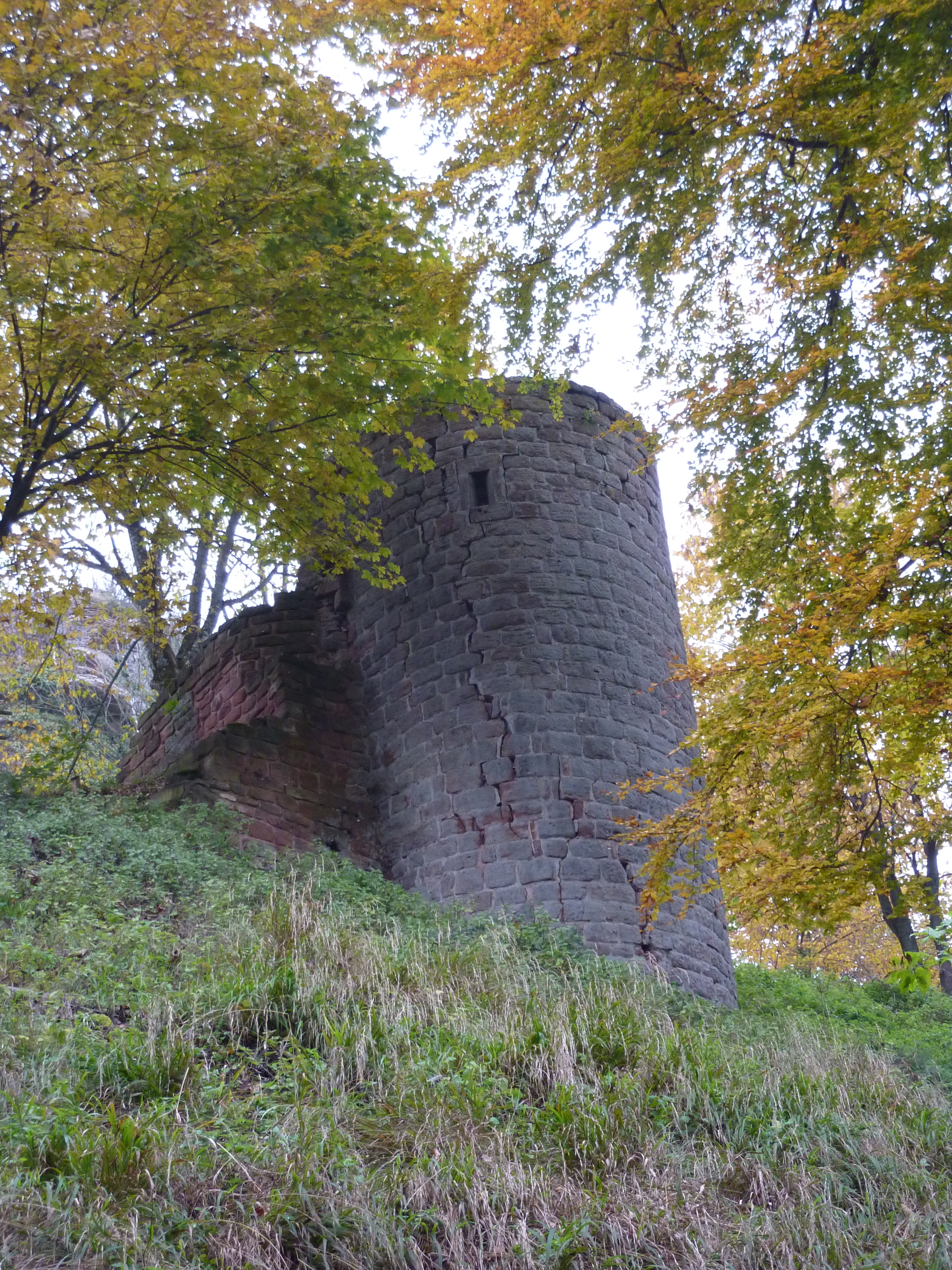
Curtain wall tower

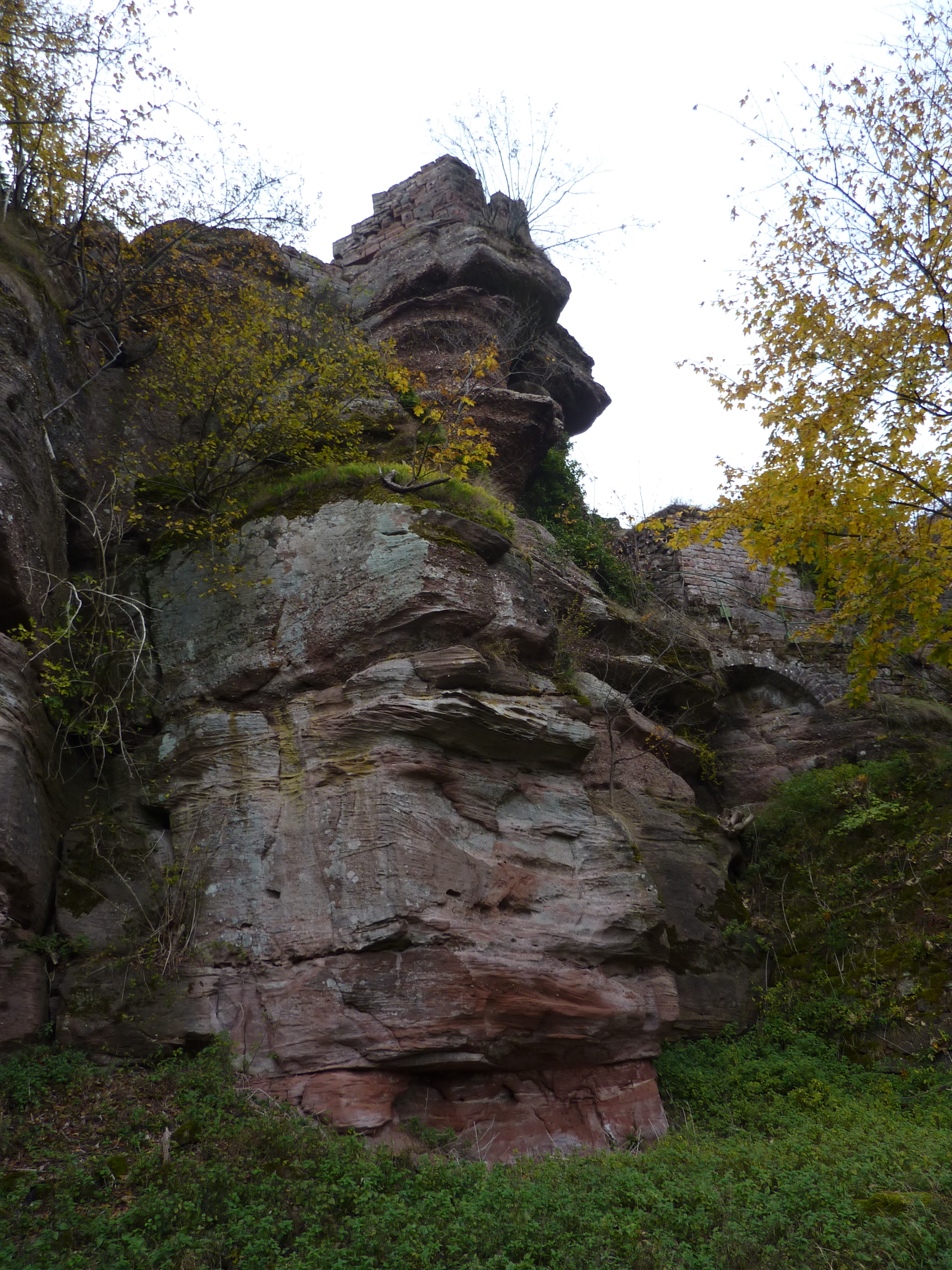
Chapel from the courtyard

== See also ==
- Ochsenstein
- Geroldseck
- Haut-Barr
- Abbaye de Marmoutier (Marmoutier Abbey)
- List of castles in France

== Bibliography ==
- Les Châteaux des Vosges, Les Châteaux autour de Saverne. Christophe Carmona et Guy Trendel, Editions Pierron
- Nouveau Dictionnaire de Biographie Alsacienne. Fédération des Sociétés d'Histoire et d'Archéologie d'Alsace, volume 28, pages 2889 to 2893
