= Gottenhouse =

Gottenhouse Gottehüse
- Commune
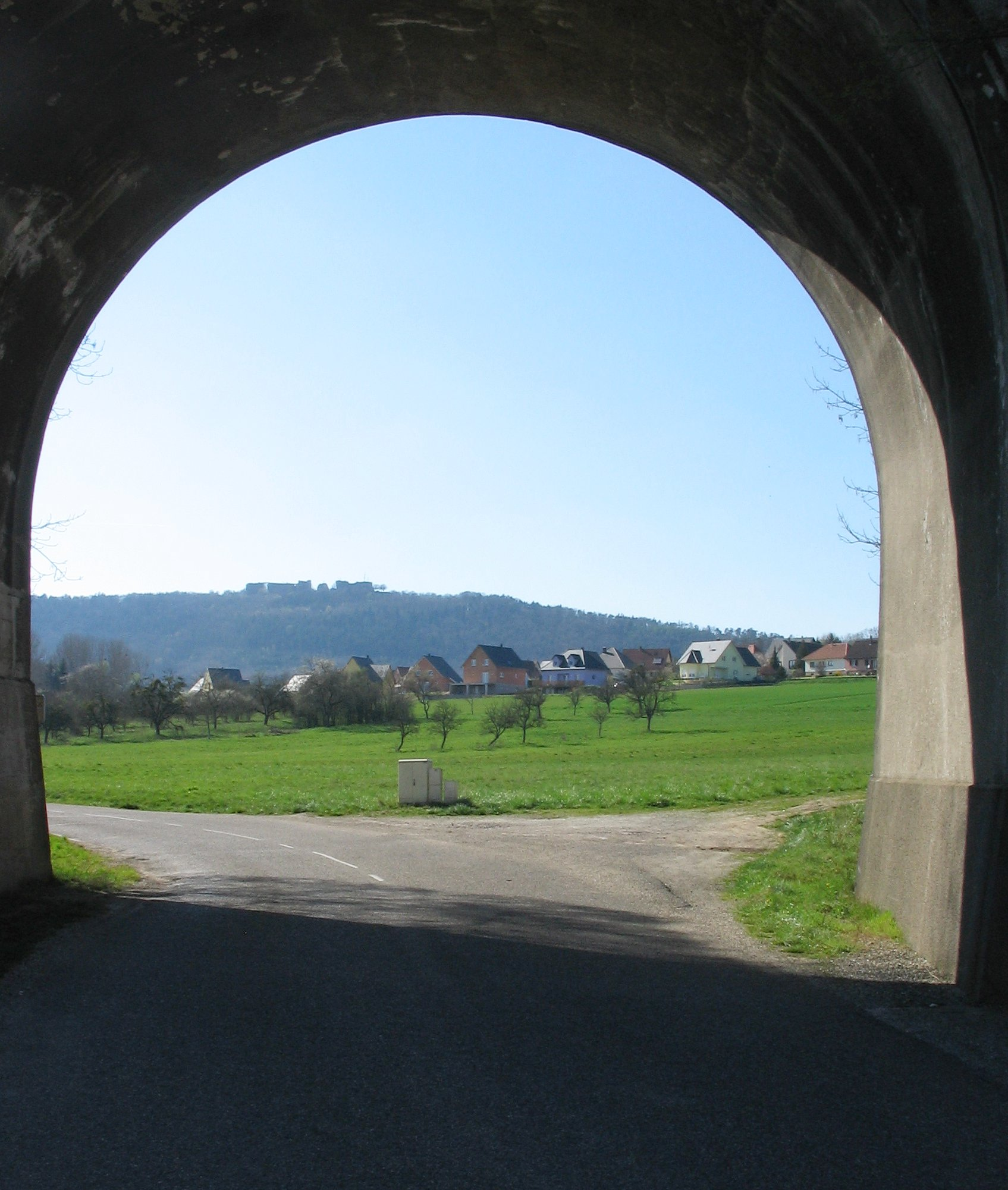
- A general view of Gottenhouse

- Coat of arms
- Location of Gottenhouse
- Location within France Location within Grand Est
- Coordinates: 48°43′18″N 7°21′43″E
- Country: France
- Region: Grand Est
- Department: Bas-Rhin
- Arrondissement: Saverne
- Canton: Saverne

Government
  - Mayor (2020–2026): Jean-Luc Simon
- Area^{1}: 1.25 km^{2} (0.48 sq mi)
- Highest elevation: 240 m (790 ft)
- Lowest elevation: 191 m (627 ft)
- Population (2023): 366
  - Density: 293/km^{2} (758/sq mi)
- Time zone: UTC+01:00 (CET)
  - Summer (DST): UTC+02:00 (CEST)
- INSEE/Postal code: 67161 /67700
- ^{1} French Land Register data, which excludes lakes, ponds, glaciers > 1 km^{2} (0.386 sq mi or 247 acres) and river estuaries.

Gottenhouse (French pronunciation: [gɔtənuz]; German: Gottenhausen) is a commune in the Bas-Rhin department in Grand Est in north-eastern France.

The name of the commune was officially changed from Gottenhausen to Gottenhouse in February 1948.

== Geography ==
Gottenhouse is part of the canton of Saverne and of the arrondissement of Saverne. The commune is one of the 35 members of the Communauté de communes du Pays de Saverne.

The commune is small, with just 1.25 square kilometres of land. Gottenhouse is positioned on the left bank of the little River Mosselbach, 2 kilometres to the south of Saverne, between the Vosges Mountains and the RN 4 trunk road.

=== Adjacent communes ===
* north: Saverne
* north-east: Otterswiller
* south-east: Marmoutier
* south: Thal-Marmoutier
* south-west: Haegen

== History ==
The soil here is not particularly fertile, which may explain why Gottenhouse shows no evidence of having been settled until well after the Western Roman Empire period. The village appears as Godenhusa in a 10th-century list of the assets of the Abbey of Marmoutier. The settlement appears to have been administratively independent at this stage, but by the beginning of the next century Gottenhouse and Otterswiller had become part of a single administrative unit. The name of the settlement changed only slightly over the years, to Gotzhuse (1363), Gotenhusen (1371), Gottenhusen (1427), Gottenhausen (1520) and in Alsatian Gottehüse. After 1871, with the annexation of Alsace and Lorraine by Germany, many towns and villages adopted rediscovered German language names, and this is when the name Gottenhausen became mainstream. The adoption of a francophone version of the name, Gottenhouse, dates from 1948.

Being an asset of the Abbey of Marmoutier, the fortunes of Gottenhouse followed those of the abbey. The Bishop of Metz, overlord of Marmoutier, effectively delegated protection of the abbey and its lands to the Geroldseck family, who seem to have abused the bishop's trust. From the middle of the 13th century the lands of the abbey effectively came to form a part of the lands of the Geroldsecks. The abbey lands were over time divided into four lordships by the middle of the 16th century and it was not until 1705 that the Abbey of Marmoutier succeeded in reunifying its ancient territories. Under the new regime, between 1790 and 1801 Gottenhouse became part of the Canton of Saverne before being reattached to that of Marmoutier.

In terms of economic well-being as reflected in demographic changes, Gottenhouse in 1612 included 8 people of burger/bourgeois standing, being approximately a fortieth of the total population, but by the 1648 end of the Thirty Years War the settlement had been abandoned. In 1662 there were, however, 11 families here, and by 1693 there were fourteen families including two that were registered as Protestants. The population increased steadily until the middle of the 19th century, with twenty families in 1720 and populations of 158 in 1791, 260 in 1807 and 302 in 1851. Thereafter, in common with many villages in Alsace, the lure of factory wages in the industrialising towns and cities is reflected in a steady decline, to a population of 226 in 1905 and 208 in 1968. Population decline was then arrested only in the 1970s with the growth in individual mobility that followed the general economic growth and increased car ownership associated with the 1960s: during the last three decades the population has risen strongly and in 2005 stood at 373.

On the spiritual side, the parish was affiliated with Marmoutier until 1685 when it came under the control of Haegen. In 1757 power over Gottenhouse parish was switched to the parish of Otterswiller which has ever since retained authority over Gottenhouse.

In the late medieval period there is mention of a Chapel of St Lambert, but the chapel seems to have disappeared before or during the predations of the 17th century, which also wrecked the parish church of that time. The current church dates from 1866, but it incorporates a 12th-century bell tower. During the late 20th century the church attracted the attention of the heritage movement. The casing of the organ was designated an historic monument in 1977, and the interior of the church, including the organ, benefited recently from an extensive restoration programme which started in 1989.

== See also ==
- Communes of the Bas-Rhin department
