= Château de Herrenstein =

Ruined castle in Grand Est, France

Coordinates: 48°49′29″N 7°23′41″E

The Château de Herrenstein is a ruined castle in the commune of Neuwiller-lès-Saverne in the Bas-Rhin département of France.

== History ==
The seigneurie of Herrenstein, with the villages of Dettwiller, Dossenheim, Hattmatt, Kleinwiesentau and Kugelberg, belonged to the Bishop of Metz who entrusted it to his advocatus to protect the Neuviller Abbey (as the Grand-Geroldseck and Petit-Geroldseck castles protected the Marmoutier Abbey).

Though the site has probably been fortified since the 9th century, the present castle was built at the start of the 11th century, by the Counts of Eguisheim-Dabo, then advocatus. Around 1005, Hugues d’Eguisheim sided with the Holy Roman Emperor against the Bishop of Metz. His castle was ruined by the latter's troops. The castle was later rebuilt. Under the episcopate of Philippe de Florange (1261-1263), it was again ravaged, this time by Henri II de Lichtenberg and the Bishop of Strasbourg. From the end of the 13th century, the castle was ceded by the Bishop of Metz, to Lichtenberg. Guillaume de Diest captured the castle around 1396.

The castle's domains were bought bit by bit by the free town of Strasbourg, which became dominant in 1480. The castle housed a garrison of six to twelve men. In the 16th century, it was modernised by Daniel Specklin, architect of the town of Strasbourg, to make it a fortress capable of resisting early artillery. Herrenstein protected the seigneurie where Protestants sought refuge, Strasbourg having adopted the Protestant Reformation.

During the French occupation of Alsace by the troops of Louis XIV, as part of his politique des réunions, Herrenstein was bought by Reinhold de Rosen (1604-1667), the king's lieutenant general, who modernised it and lived there.

In 1673, the castle was destroyed by the French troops of Joseph de Montclar and it was used as a quarry for the fortification of Lichtenberg. A document dated 1778 describes Herrenstein as a "vieux château partiellement en ruines avec une habitation pour le garde-chasse et le garde-forestier" ("old castle partially in ruins with a house for the gamekeeper and forest keeper").

The castle is not classified as a monument historique by the French Ministry of Culture, but does appear on the Ministry's database.

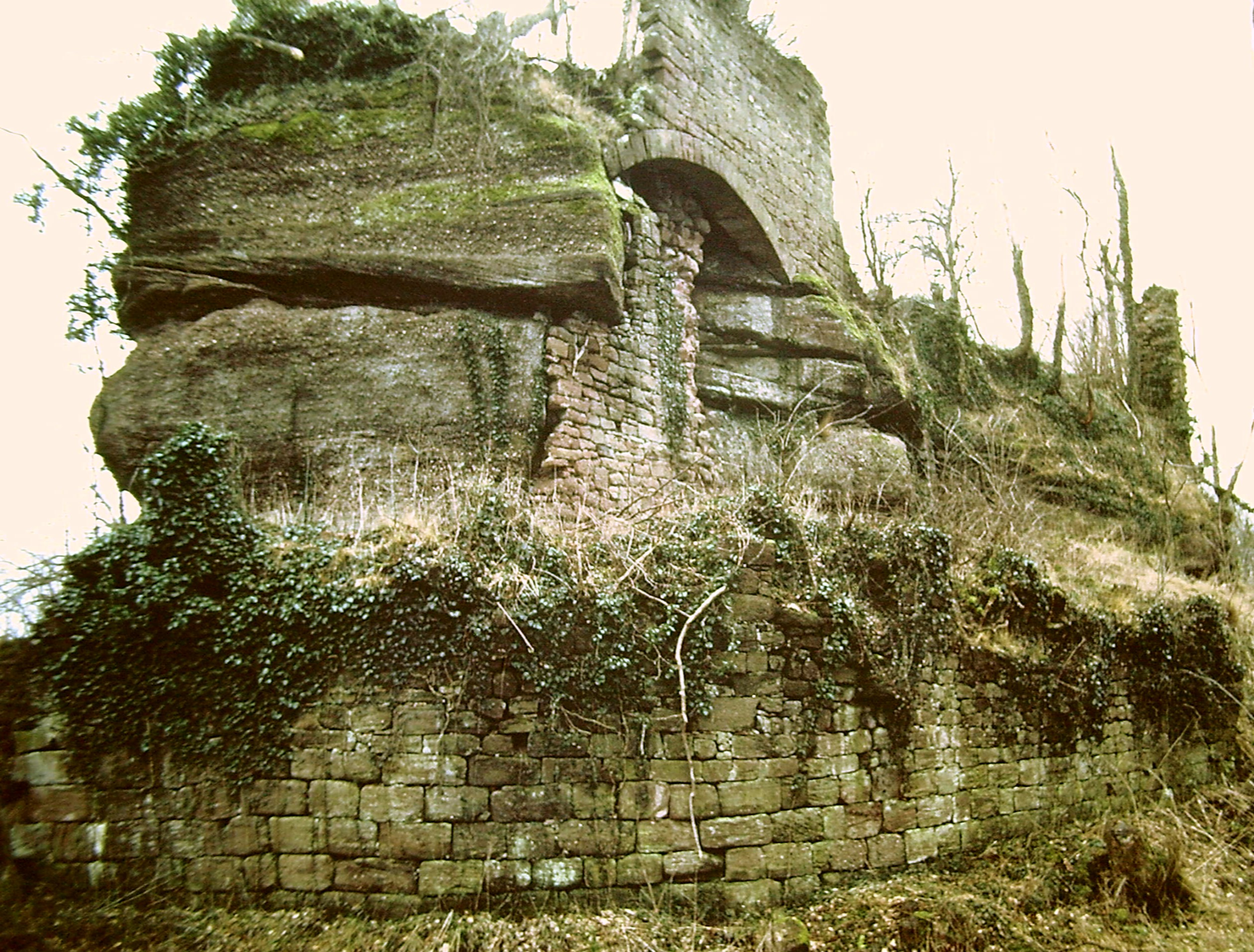

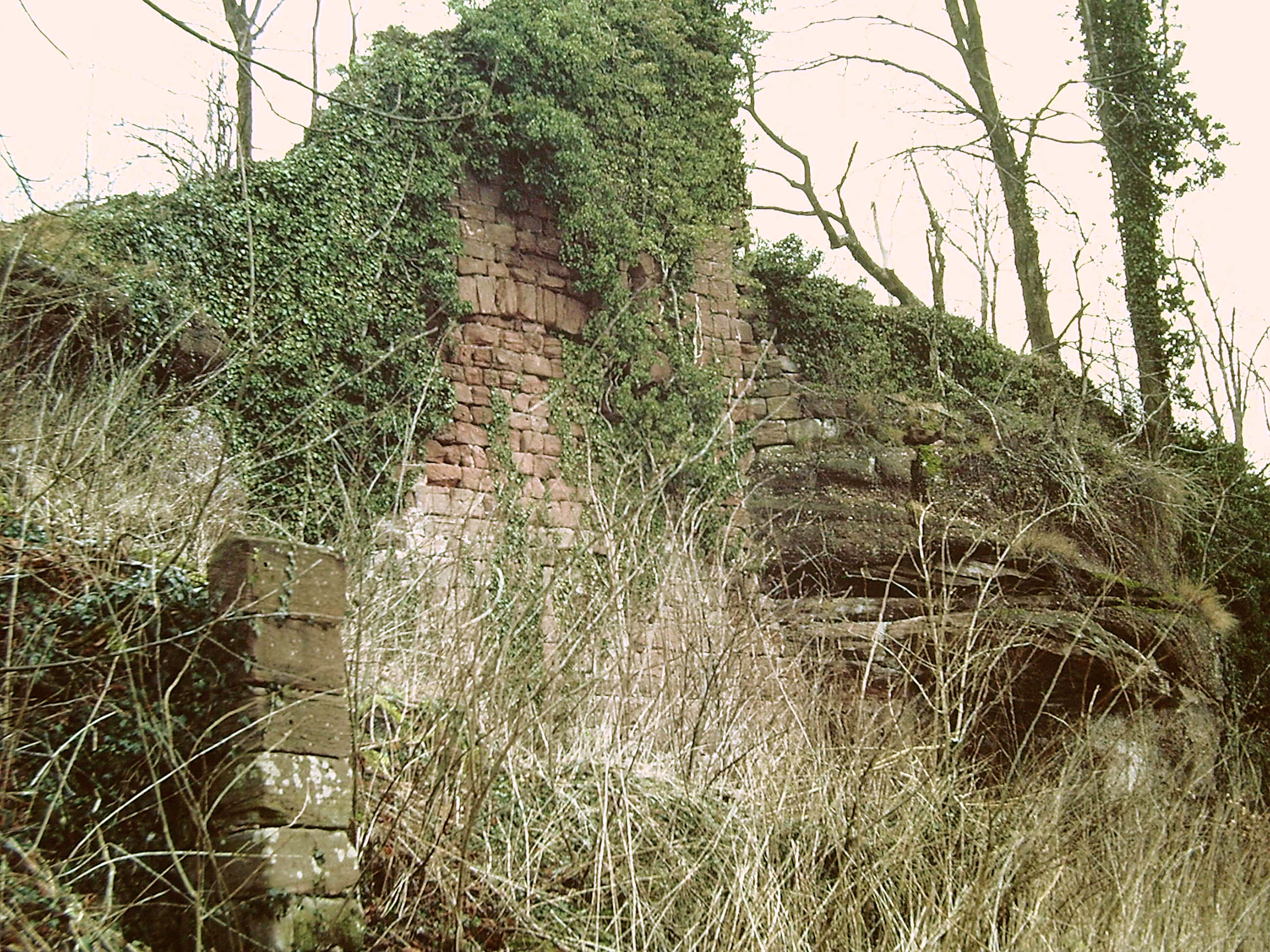

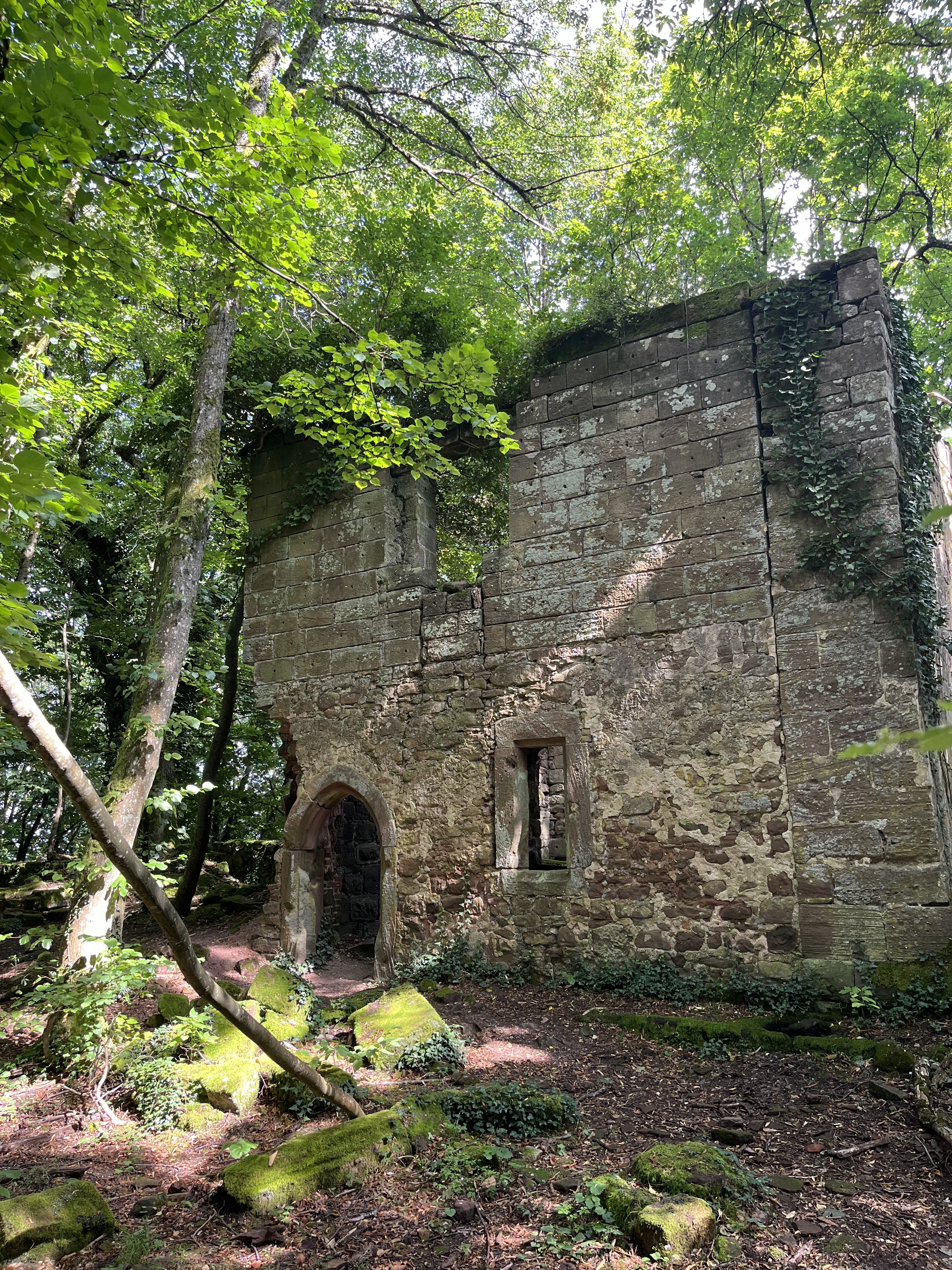

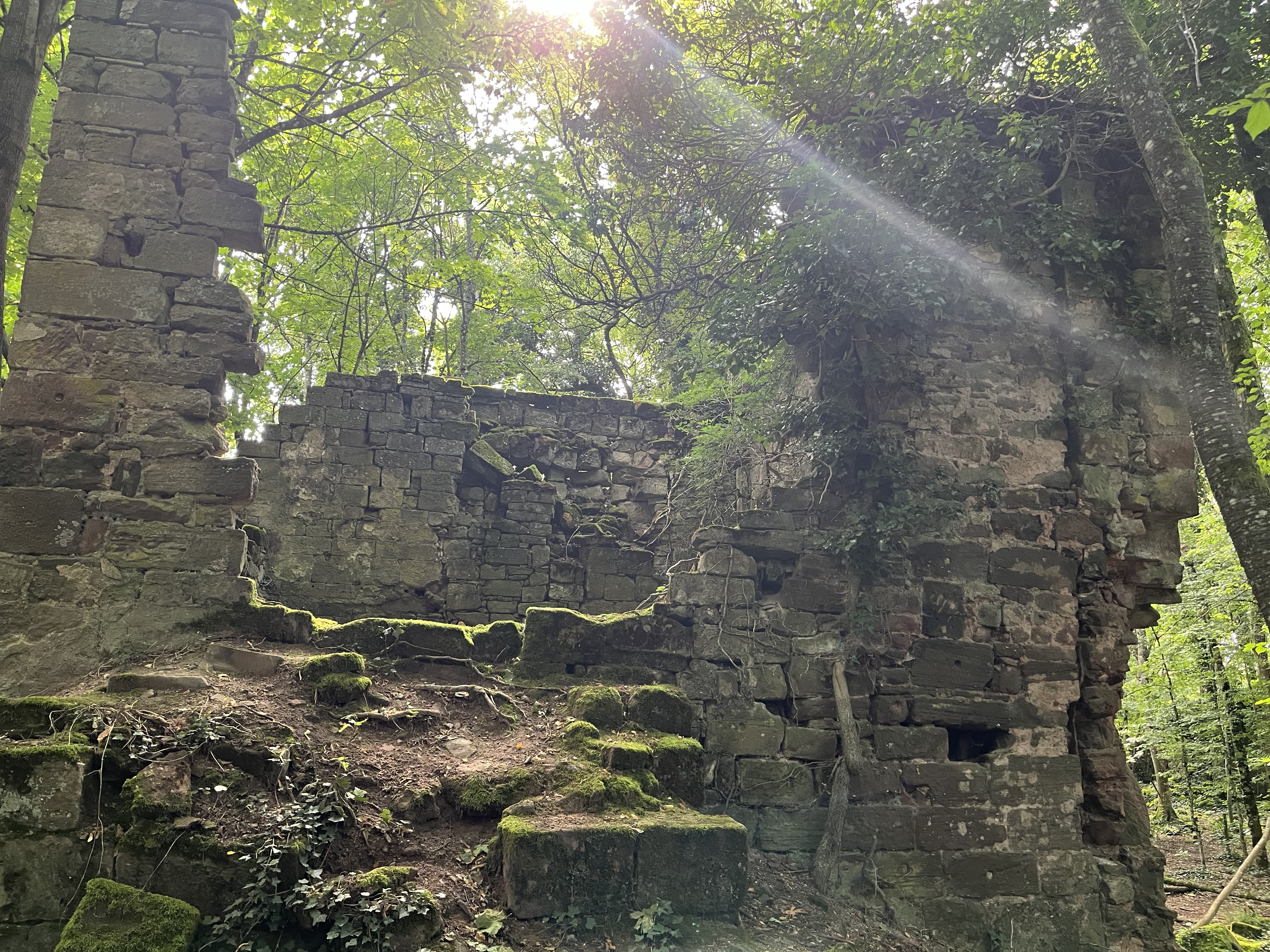

== See also ==
- List of castles in France
