= Haegen =

Haegen Haaje
- Commune
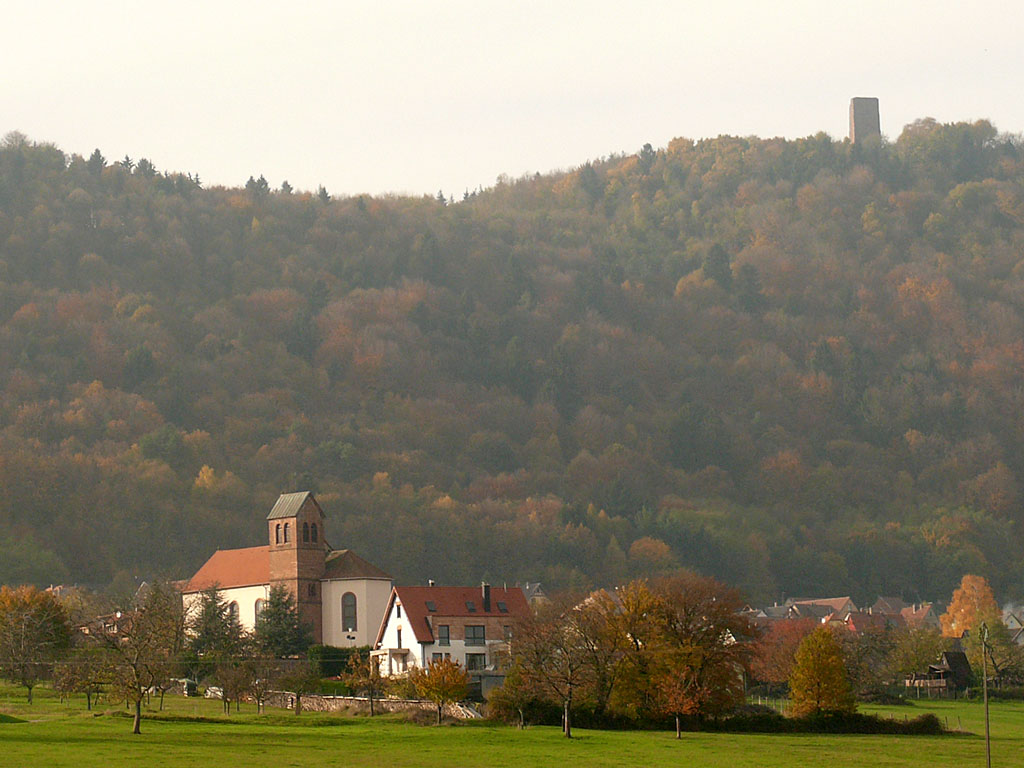
- Haegen overlooked by the Château du Grand-Geroldseck

- Coat of arms
- Location of Haegen
- Location within France Location within Grand Est
- Coordinates: 48°42′53″N 7°20′23″E
- Country: France
- Region: Grand Est
- Department: Bas-Rhin
- Arrondissement: Saverne
- Canton: Saverne
- Intercommunality: Pays de Saverne

Government
  - Mayor (2020–2026): Marie-Pierre Oberlé
- Area^{1}: 20.32 km^{2} (7.85 sq mi)
- Highest elevation: 587 m (1,926 ft)
- Lowest elevation: 195 m (640 ft)
- Population (2023): 671
  - Density: 33.0/km^{2} (85.5/sq mi)
- Time zone: UTC+01:00 (CET)
  - Summer (DST): UTC+02:00 (CEST)
- INSEE/Postal code: 67179 /67700
- ^{1} French Land Register data, which excludes lakes, ponds, glaciers > 1 km^{2} (0.386 sq mi or 247 acres) and river estuaries.

Haegen (French pronunciation: [ɛɡən]; German: Hägen) is a commune in the Bas-Rhin department in Grand Est in north-eastern France.

== Population ==
Historical population
Year	Pop.	±% p.a.
1968	502	—
1975	512	+0.28%
1982	511	−0.03%
1990	569	+1.35%
1999	627	+1.08%
2007	637	+0.20%
2012	657	+0.62%
2017	677	+0.60%
2023	671	−0.15%
Source: INSEE

== Geography ==
Haegen is a mountain village located on the western frontier of Alsace which at this point coincides with the western frontier of the Alemanish dialect area. Across the Vosges Mountains to the west of the commune is Lorraine.

On the Alsace side, neighbouring communes are Saverne and Gottenhouse to the north-east, and Thal-Marmoutier and Reinhardsmunster to the south-east.

== Landmarks ==
The commune contains the ruined remains of a twelfth-century castle, one of the earliest surviving castles in the North Vosges region, and of a fourteenth-century smaller fortress. These are known as the Château du Grand-Geroldseck and the Château du Petit-Geroldseck.

== See also ==
- Communes of the Bas-Rhin department
