= Château de Greifenstein =

Ruined castle in Saverne in the Bas-Rhin département of France

Coordinates: 48°44′9″N 7°20′3″E

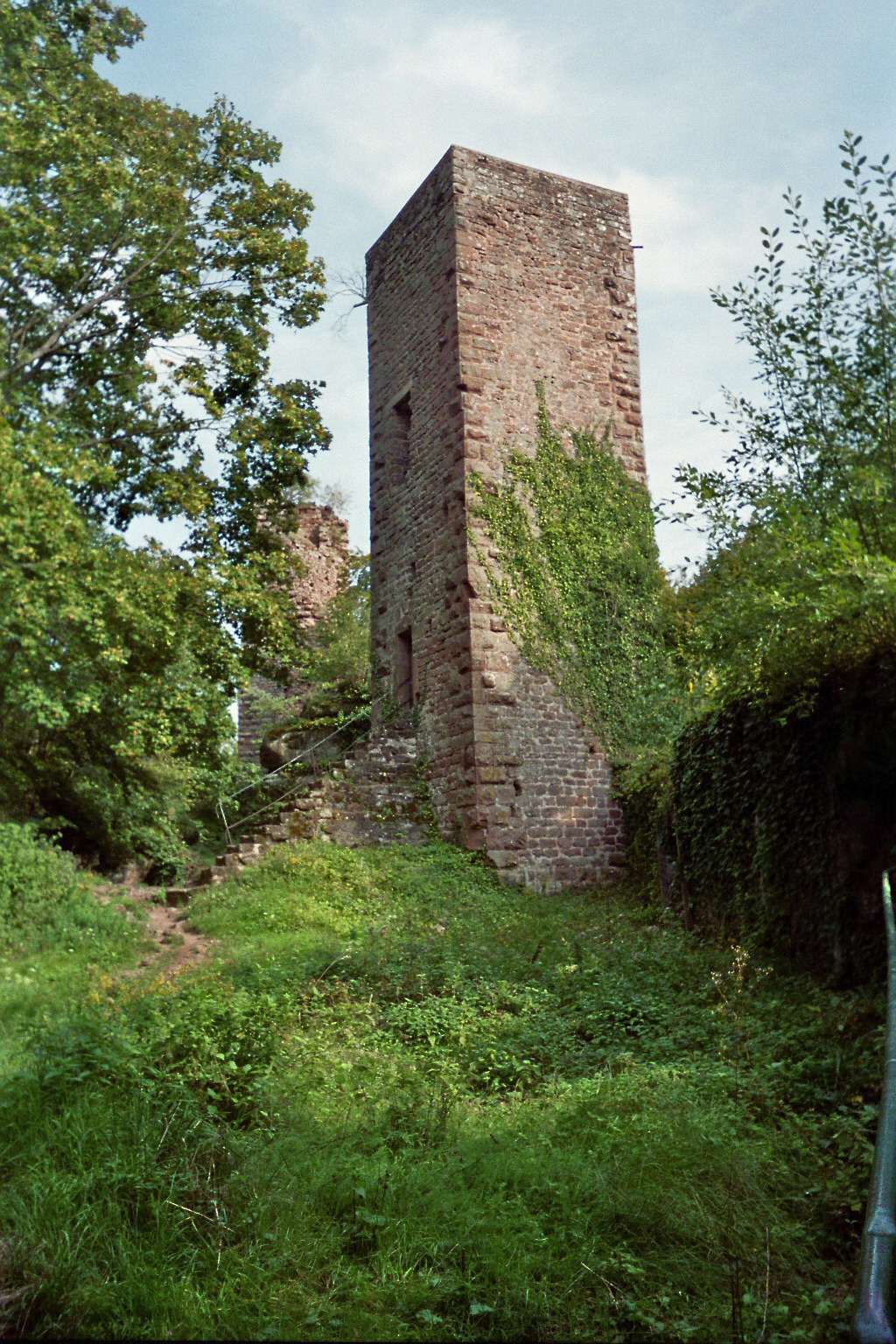
Central tower, probably part of Grand-Greifenstein

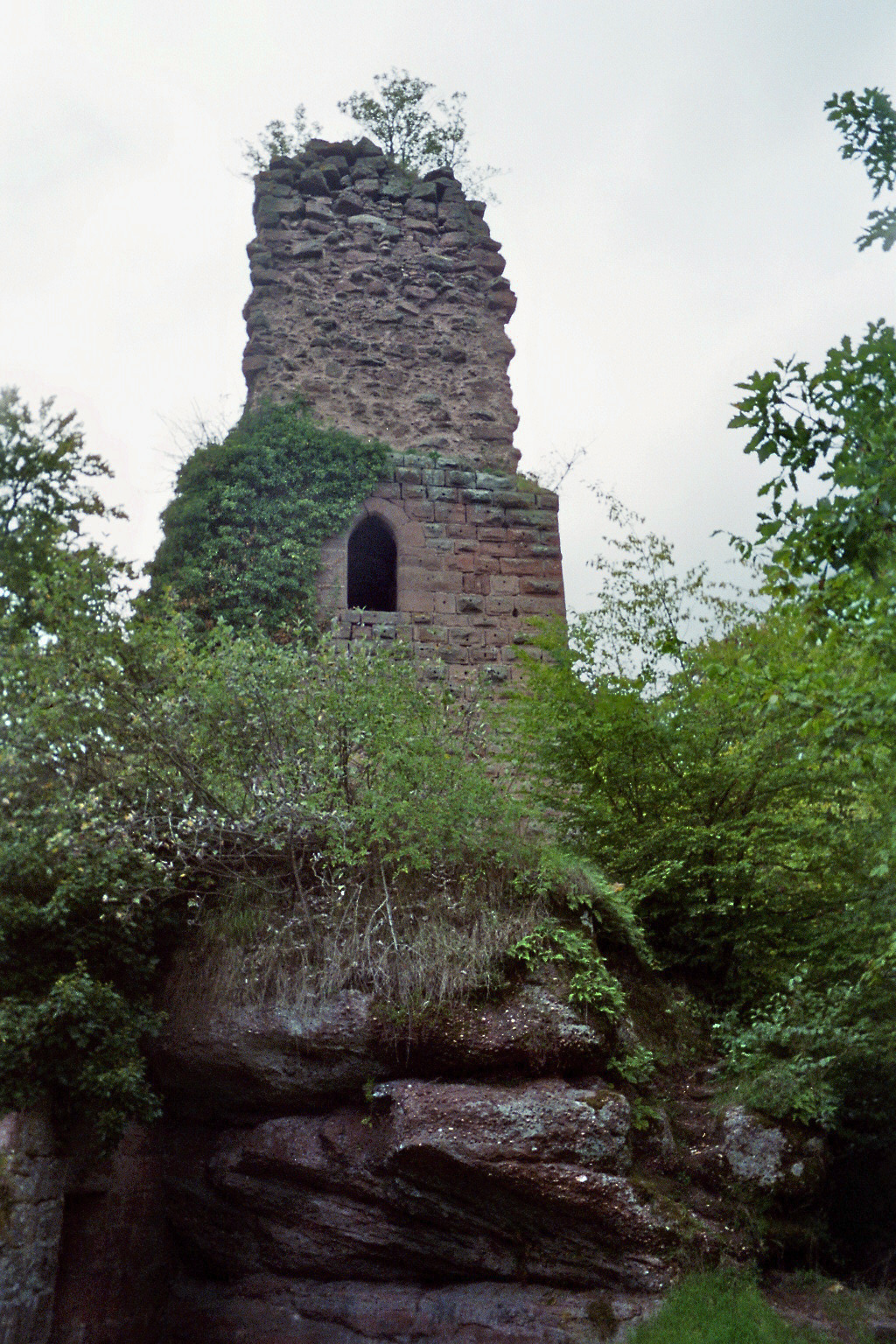
Petit-Greifenstein

The Château de Greifenstein (French pronunciation: [ʃato də ɡʁaifənʃtain]) is a ruined castle in the commune of Saverne in the Bas-Rhin département of France. Property of the state, it has been listed since 1898 as a monument historique by the French Ministry of Culture.

== History ==
The Grand-Greifenstein was, without doubt, founded in the first half of the 12th century by the knight Meribodo de Greifenstein who had close links to the Ochenstein family. The Petit-Greifenstein dates from the end of the 13th century or start of the 14th century.

== Description ==
Visitors can distinguish two castles separated by a large ditch. The older part has the largest keep in Alsace with 13 metres a side. A renovated tower stands between the two keeps at the centre of the site. It was probably part of Grand-Greifenstein. From the terrace there is an unimpeded view of Saverne, the Château du Haut-Barr, the Château du Grand-Geroldseck, the valley of the Zorn and the Saint-Vit chapel.

== Access ==
To reach the castle, leave Saverne on the D132 road towards Lutzelbourg and turn right towards the Ramsthal lake. Then follow the Club Vosgien path signposted by a blue rectangle.
