= Greifenstein (disambiguation) =

Greifenstein is a municipality in Germany.

It may also refer to the following castles:

- Burg Greifenstein in Austria
- Château de Greifenstein in Saverne, France
- Greifenstein Castle in Filisur, Switzerland
- Greifenstein Castle (Hesse) in Greifenstein, Germany
- Schloss Greifenstein in Heiligenstadt in Oberfranken, Germany
- Castel Greifenstein, a ruin near Bolzano, Italy
