= Église Saint-Blaise de Sindelsberg =

Church in Marmountier, France

Coordinates: 48°41′51″N 7°22′03″E

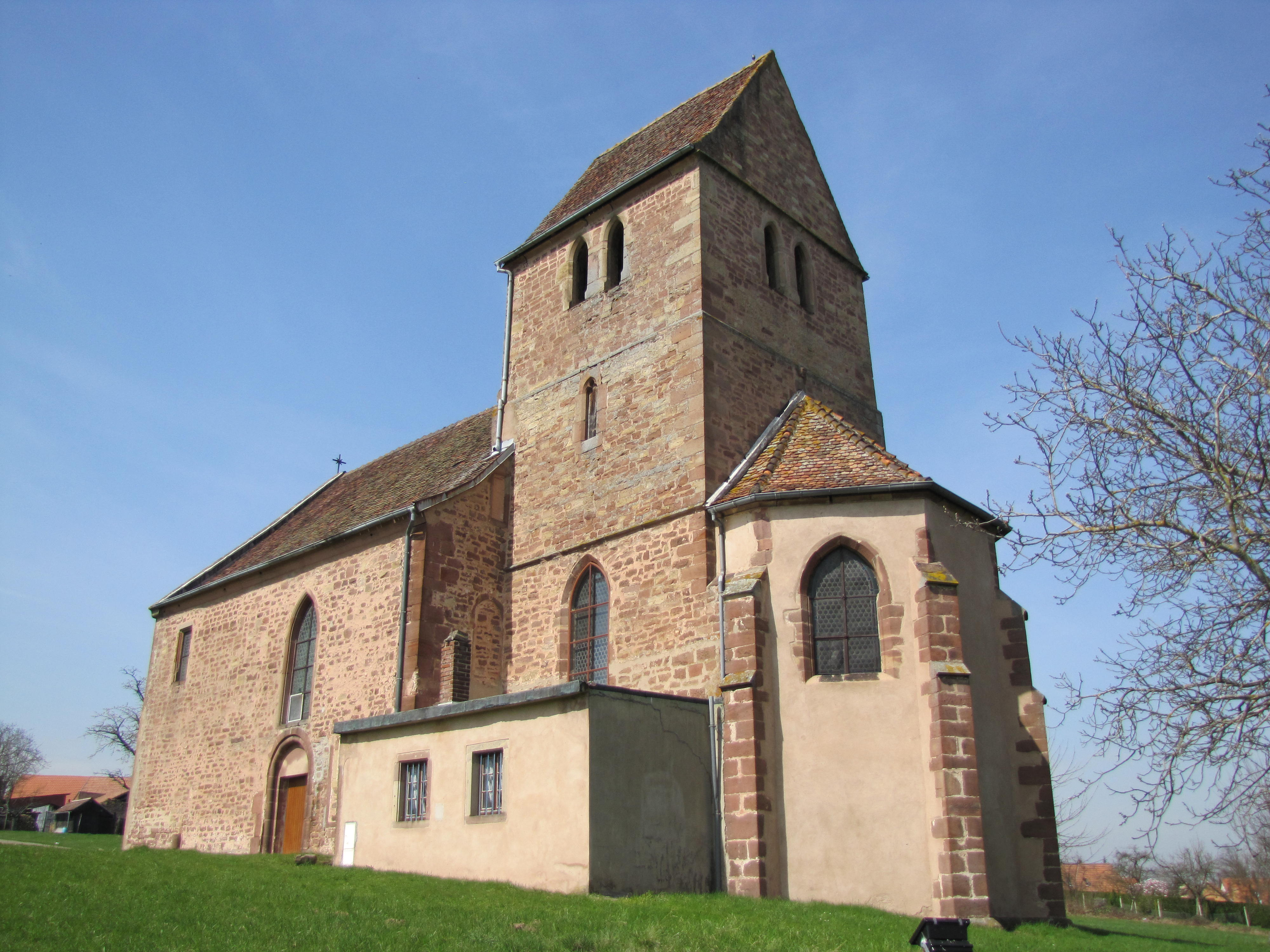
Église Saint-Blaise de Sindelsberg.

Église Saint-Blaise de Sindelsberg is a church in Marmoutier, Bas-Rhin, Alsace, France. Originally dated to the 12th century, it was built in 1584 and underwent renovation work in 1872. It became a registered Monument historique in 1935.
