= Jacques Frédéric Français =

French engineer and mathematician

- Born: 20 June 1775
- Died: 9 March 1833 (aged 57)
- Citizenship: French
- Education: Royal College of Strasbourg
- Known for: Cartesian coordinates
- Scientific career
- Fields: Mathematician

Jacques Frédéric Français (20 June 1775 – 9 March 1833) was a French engineer and mathematician.

== Biography ==
Born on 20 June 1775, Jacques Frédéric Français was the son of a grocer of Saverne. He attended the Royal College of Strasbourg and enrolled voluntarily in the Army of the Rhine in 1793. In September 1794 he was transferred to the military engineering corps. Admitted to the École Polytechnique in the autumn of 1797, he moved in the spring of 1798 to the École du Génie de Metz and graduated with the brevet of first lieutenant. It was at this time that he wrote about the integration of differential equations. In January 1801 he took part in the Egyptian Campaign of the French Army. On his return in 1801 he was assigned to the port of Toulon. Named captain of the sappers in December 1801, he became second in command of the headquarters of the corps of engineers in November 1802.

Under the orders of Admiral Pierre-Charles de Villeneuve, he took part in the naval battles of Cape Finisterre and Trafalgar. In 1807, he was transferred to the regiment of the Colonel Étienne Louis Malus in Strasbourg. He became in 1811 professor of military art at the École d’Application du Génie et de l’Artillerie in Metz until his death in 1833.

His mathematical work focused on the study of the changes of Cartesian coordinates applied to systems of planes and lines and the geometric representation of complex numbers based on original ideas of his uncle Louis François Antoine Arbogast. They have been published for the most part in the Annales de Gergonne. After the death of his brother François;in 1810, he published his treatise Recherches sur la poussée des terres (1817).

== Publications ==
- Mémoire sur le mouvement de rotation d’un corps solide libre autour de son centre de masse, Paris, 1813
