= Château du Petit-Geroldseck =

Ruined medieval castle in France

Coordinates: 48°42′52″N 7°19′56″E

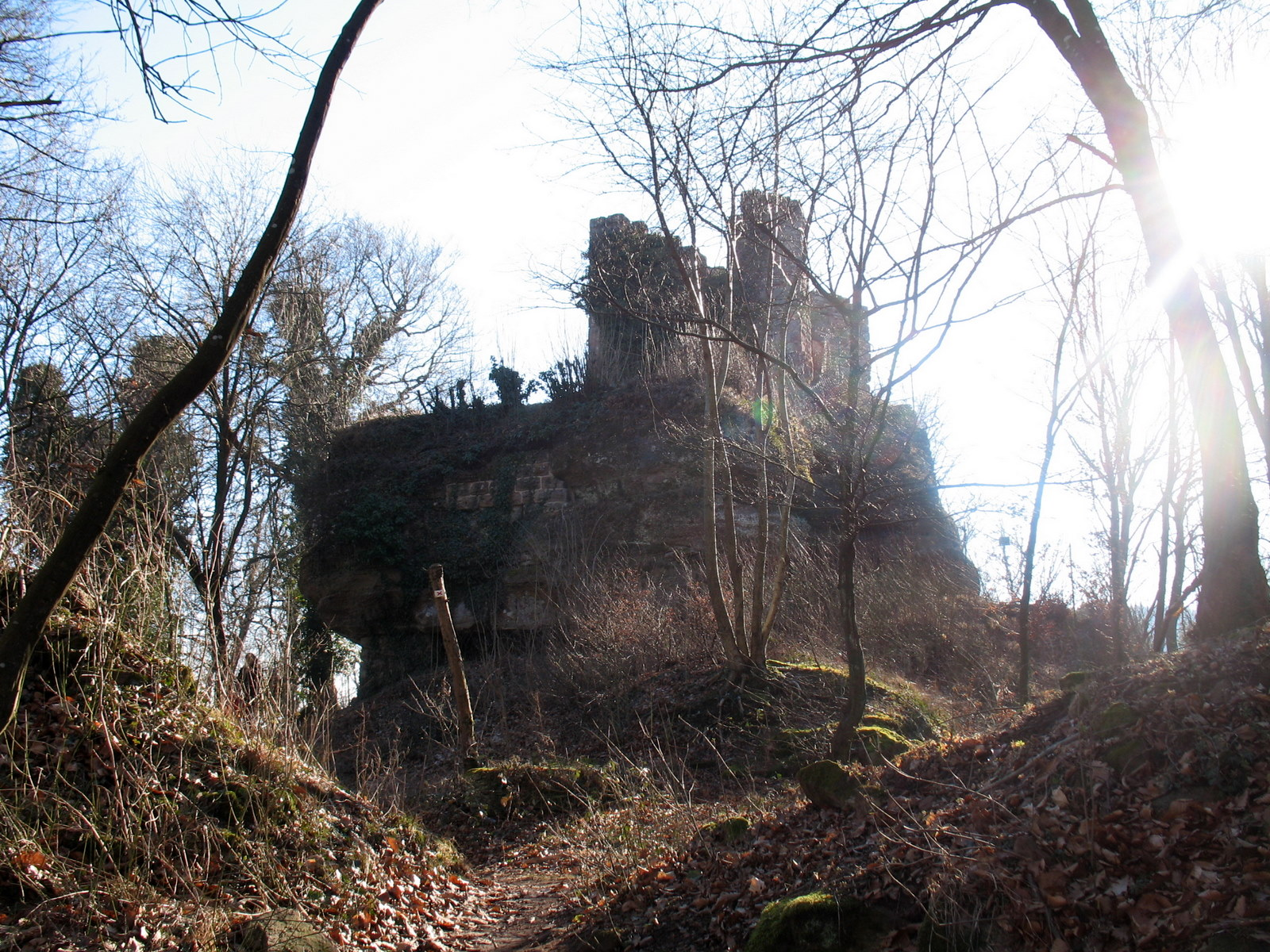

The Château du Petit-Geroldseck is a ruined castle situated in the commune of Haegen in the département of Bas-Rhin in Alsace, France. It is dated to the 13th century. It has been listed since 1898 as a monument historique by the French Ministry of Culture.

== Description ==
The destiny of the castle was linked to that of the Château du Grand-Geroldseck, 500 metres (550 yd) north of Petit-Geroldseck. It dates from the 13th century. The ruins themselves are of limited interest, but they provide a view of the hills of Alsace.

The lower court, the keep and remnant of the corps de logis are still visible.

== Access ==
The ruins can be reached from Saverne, on the D171 road and a forest road to Hexentisch, from where a path marked with red crossed leads to the site.

== See also ==
- List of castles in France
