= François Français =

French mathematician

- Born: April 7, 1768; Saverne, France
- Died: October 10, 1810 (aged 42); Mainz
- Citizenship: French
- Education: Seminarian
- Known for: differential calculus
- Scientific career
- Fields: Mathematician

Joseph François Français was a French mathematician. François Français worked extensively on differential calculus. He developed on the previous work of Jean-Robert Argand on complex numbers.

== Biography ==
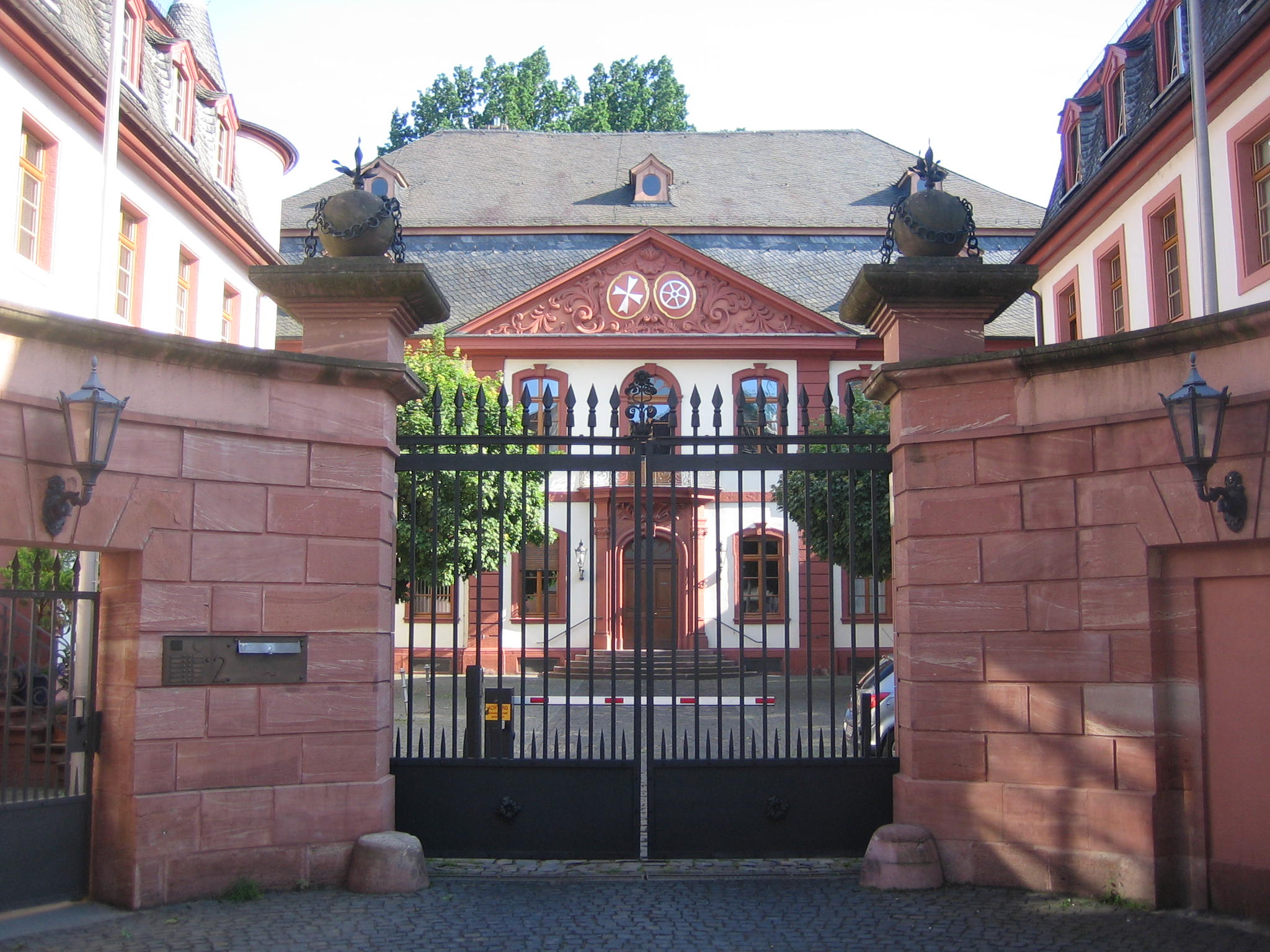
Hotel of the Order of the Holy Sepulcher, Mainz. Chain-covered ball bombs, from which flames strike, are located at the entrance gate as an allegory for the French artillery school, where François Français was teaching.

François Français was a student in a seminary and afterwards he became a teacher at Colmar College in 1791 for one year and then moved to Strasbourg College in 1792.

The aftermath of the French Revolution of 1789 interrupted his career. Not everyone supported the government that formed after the revolution. The revolution overthrew the monarchy of King Louis XVI to establish a republic but brought in years of turmoil that finally led to the rise of Napoleon.

France faced both internal and external wars. A civil war broke out in 1793 in the coastal region of Vendée in western France as a reaction against the imposition of conscription. This became known as the Guerre de Vendée or War in the Vendée.

The next month royalists and peasants came together in February 1793 and formed an army to fight the new republic. The Jacobin government back in Paris considered the rebellion to be counter-revolutionary, and Royalist.

François Français joined the government's side in May and became a part of the army's response to put down this rebellion of the royalists and peasants who numbered about 80,000 men. Fighting continued until Dec 1793 but by the summer months the rebellion had lost its steam without a clear strategy. Fighting a defensive war against the government in Paris the rebellions lost 180,000 men against the governments’ 30,000 casualties. Français had already left the army in October to continue teaching but he did go back to serve in the army. In October 1797 he went to Colmar to become professor of mathematics at the École Centrale du Haut-Rhin.

Than in September 1803, he moved to Mainz to be a High School Math teacher, He taught at the artillery school in Mainz.

He did not publish his 1795 dissertation on partial differential equations, from the Académie des Sciences but his papers were used by Sylvestre François Lacroix after François Français’ death. François Français worked and wrote closely with several important mathematicians during his life and kept in contact with Adrien-Marie Legendre, Joseph-Louis Lagrange, Lacroix and Jean-Baptiste Biot.

While nothing of François Français' work was published, after his death his brother, Jacques Frédéric Français, published the treatise Recherches sur la poussée des terres (1817).
