= Kugelberg =

Kugelberg is a Swedish surname that may refer to

- Björn Kugelberg (1905–1980), Swedish sprinter
- Eric Kugelberg (1913–1983), Swedish neurophysiologist known for Kugelberg–Welander disease
- Erik Kugelberg (1891–1975), Swedish track and field athlete
- Frederik Kugelberg (1880–1963), Swedish physician and Christian missionary
- Hermann Kugelberg (1868–1950), German cellist and teacher of music in South Australia.
