= Château du Grand-Geroldseck =

Ruined medieval castle in Alsace, France

Coordinates: 48°43′8″N 7°19′56″E

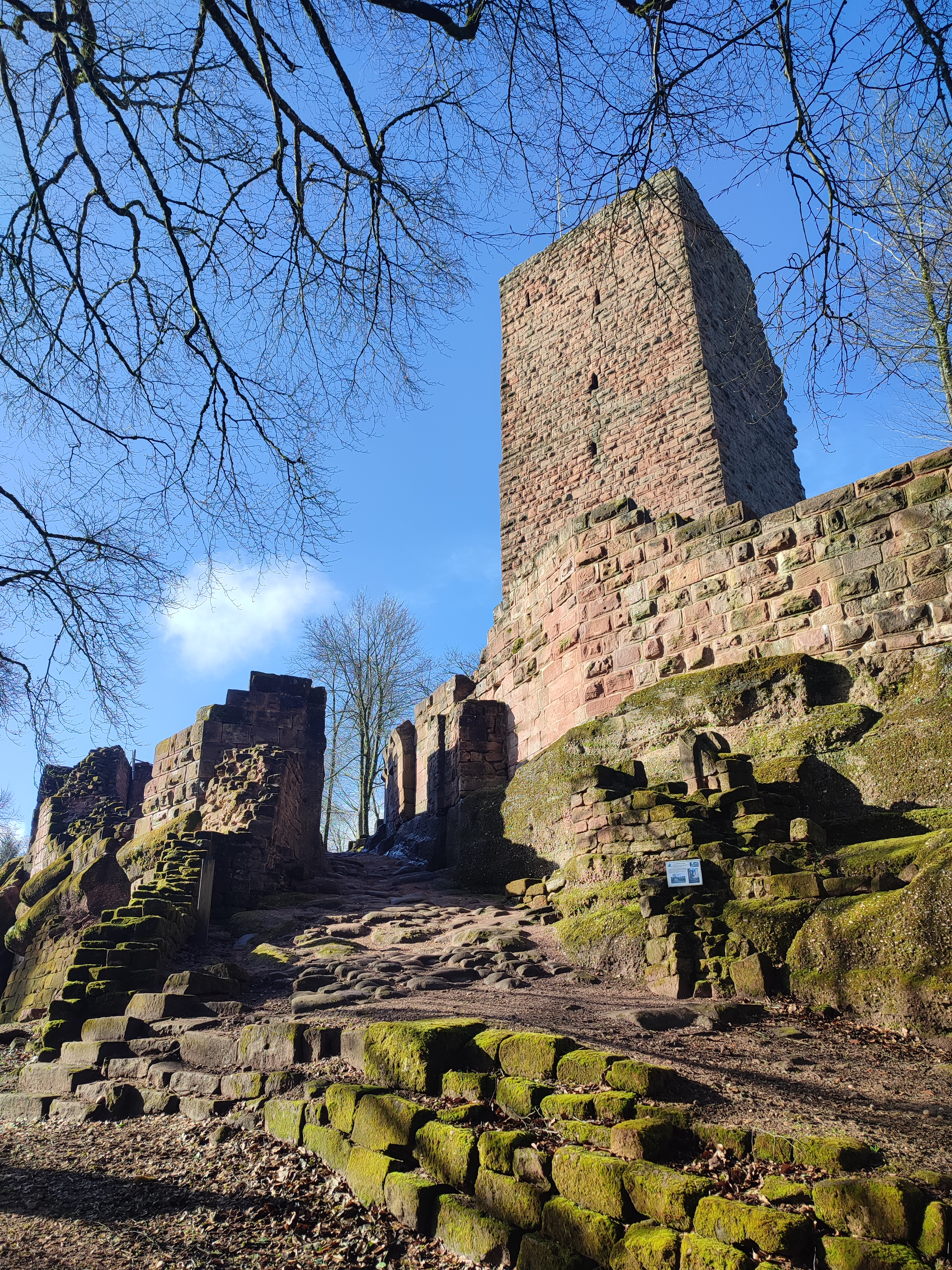

The Château du Grand-Geroldseck is a ruined medieval castle situated in the commune of Haegen in the Bas-Rhin département in Alsace, France. It was listed as a monument historique by the French Ministry of Culture in 1898.

== History ==
The castle is one of the oldest in the northern Vosges, founded at the beginning of the 12th century by the lords of Geroldseck, avoués of the abbey of Marmoutier, to ensure the protection of its territories. It constitutes a fine collection of feudal residence. Built on a platform, it combined the functions of dwelling and defence. It was heavily altered at the 13th, 14th and 15th centuries.

== Description ==
The square keep has walls three metres thick, faced in embossed stone. The cellars of the lord's residence and the barbican are still visible.

== See also ==
- Château du Petit-Geroldseck, 500 metres (550 yd) south of Grand-Geroldseck
- List of castles in France
