= Château d'Échéry =

Ruined castle in Sainte-Croix-aux-Mines, France

Coordinates: 48°16′06″N 7°11′47″E

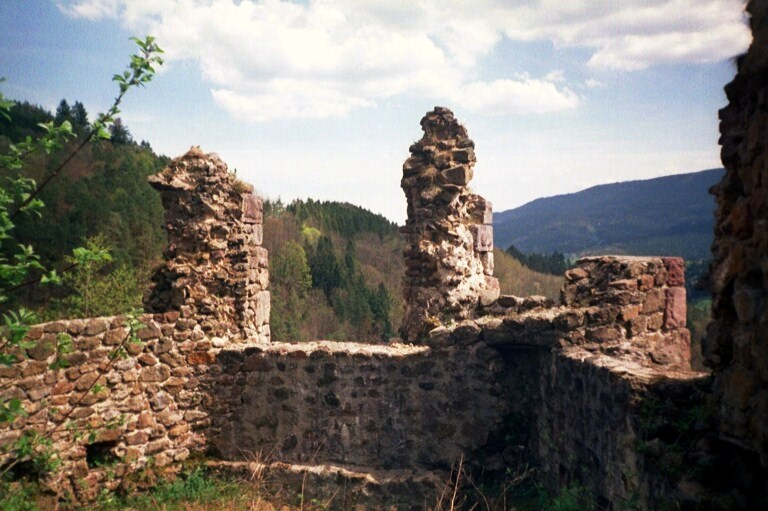

The Château d'Échéry is a ruined castle situated in the commune of Sainte-Croix-aux-Mines in the département of Haut-Rhin, Alsace, France. It is dated to the 13th century. The castle is also known today as Château de Haut-Echery or Château du Haut Eckerich and was originally named Château de Belmont.

== Description ==
Standing on a rocky outcrop to the north west of the town, the castle is in a ruined state. Only the supporting wall of the chapel, with heavy buttresses is visible. The remaining walls are of limestone hardcore.

== History ==
The castle was created by the Duke of Lorraine who gave it as a fiefdom to the lords of Echery, after whom the castle gets its name. It was first documented in 1250. The castle suffered two sieges in the second half of the 13th century, after which, with the extinction of the Echery family, it was shared between the Ribeaupierres and Hattstatts. The two families frequently quarrelled, to the extent that a wall was built to separate the parts of the castle. In 1452, the Ribeaupierres entrusted the safety of their part of the castle to the knights of Andolsheim; the Hattstatts followed suit in 1463. With the death of the last Andolsheim knight in 1472, guardianship of the castle passed to Herrmann Waldner. The castle was notorious for acts of banditry perpetrated by its occupants.

A chapel was added in 1460, built outside the original enceinte, against a thick surrounding wall. The castle was abandoned during the Thirty Years' War and fell into ruins. After the French Revolution, it was bought by a private owner and sold to the government of Alsace-Lorraine in 1880.

The castle was classified as a monument historique in 1898. However, owing to an advanced state of dilapidation, it was declassified in 1932. In 1993, it was sold by the state to an association (Association pour la conservation du château de Haut-Echery) which became responsible for its maintenance.

== See also ==
- List of castles in France
