= Otterswiller =

Otterswiller Otterschwiller
- Commune
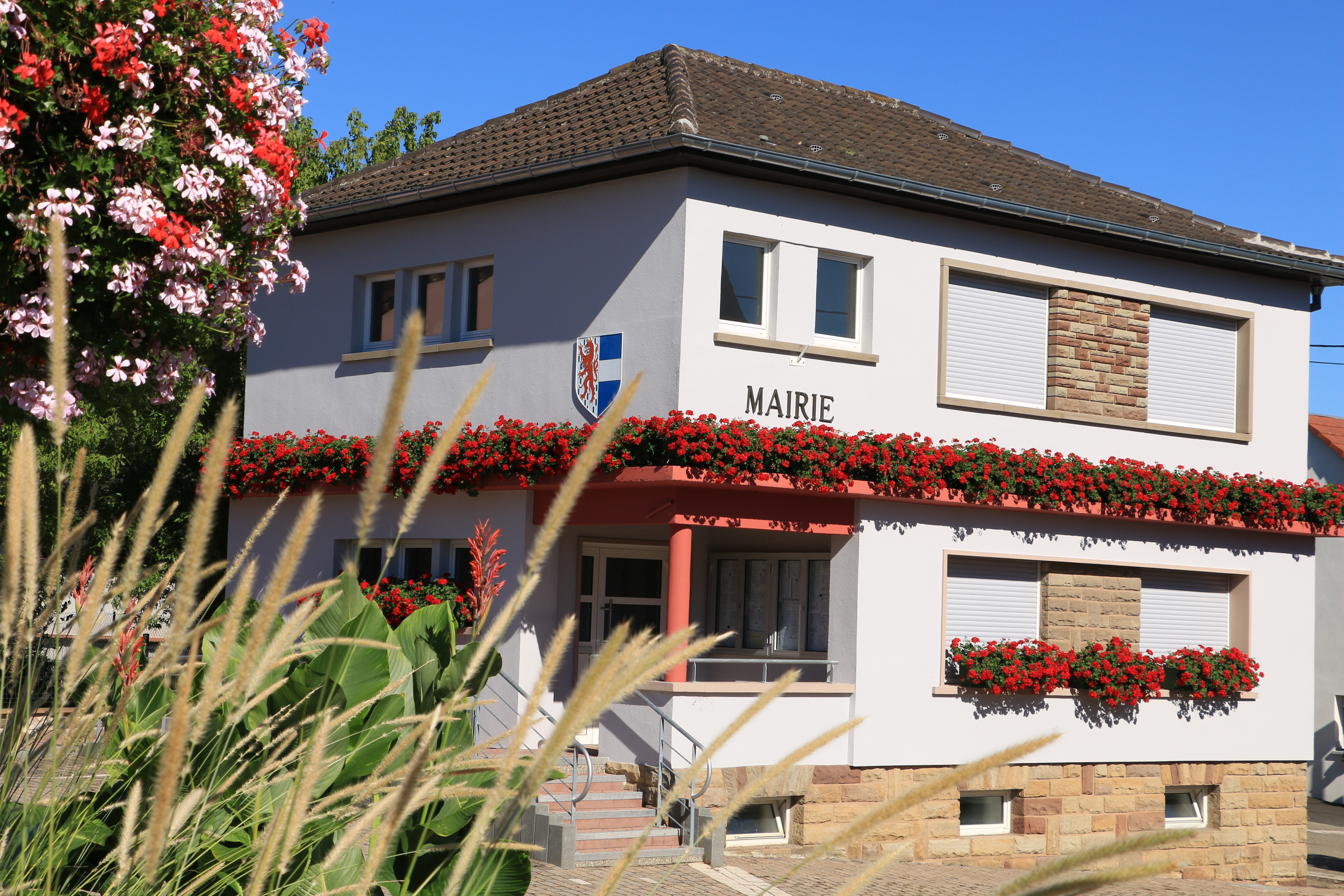
- The town hall in Otterswiller

- Coat of arms
- Location of Otterswiller
- Location within France Location within Grand Est
- Coordinates: 48°43′33″N 7°22′45″E
- Country: France
- Region: Grand Est
- Department: Bas-Rhin
- Arrondissement: Saverne
- Canton: Saverne

Government
  - Mayor (2020–2026): Joseph Cremmel
- Area^{1}: 3.28 km^{2} (1.27 sq mi)
- Highest elevation: 243 m (797 ft)
- Lowest elevation: 185 m (607 ft)
- Population (2023): 1,309
  - Density: 399/km^{2} (1,030/sq mi)
- Time zone: UTC+01:00 (CET)
  - Summer (DST): UTC+02:00 (CEST)
- INSEE/Postal code: 67367 /67700
- ^{1} French Land Register data, which excludes lakes, ponds, glaciers > 1 km^{2} (0.386 sq mi or 247 acres) and river estuaries.

Otterswiller (German: Ottersweiler) is a commune in the Bas-Rhin department in Grand Est in north-eastern France.

== See also ==
- Communes of the Bas-Rhin department
