= Château de Hohbarr =

Castle in Alsace, France

Coordinates: 48°43′30″N 7°20′19″E

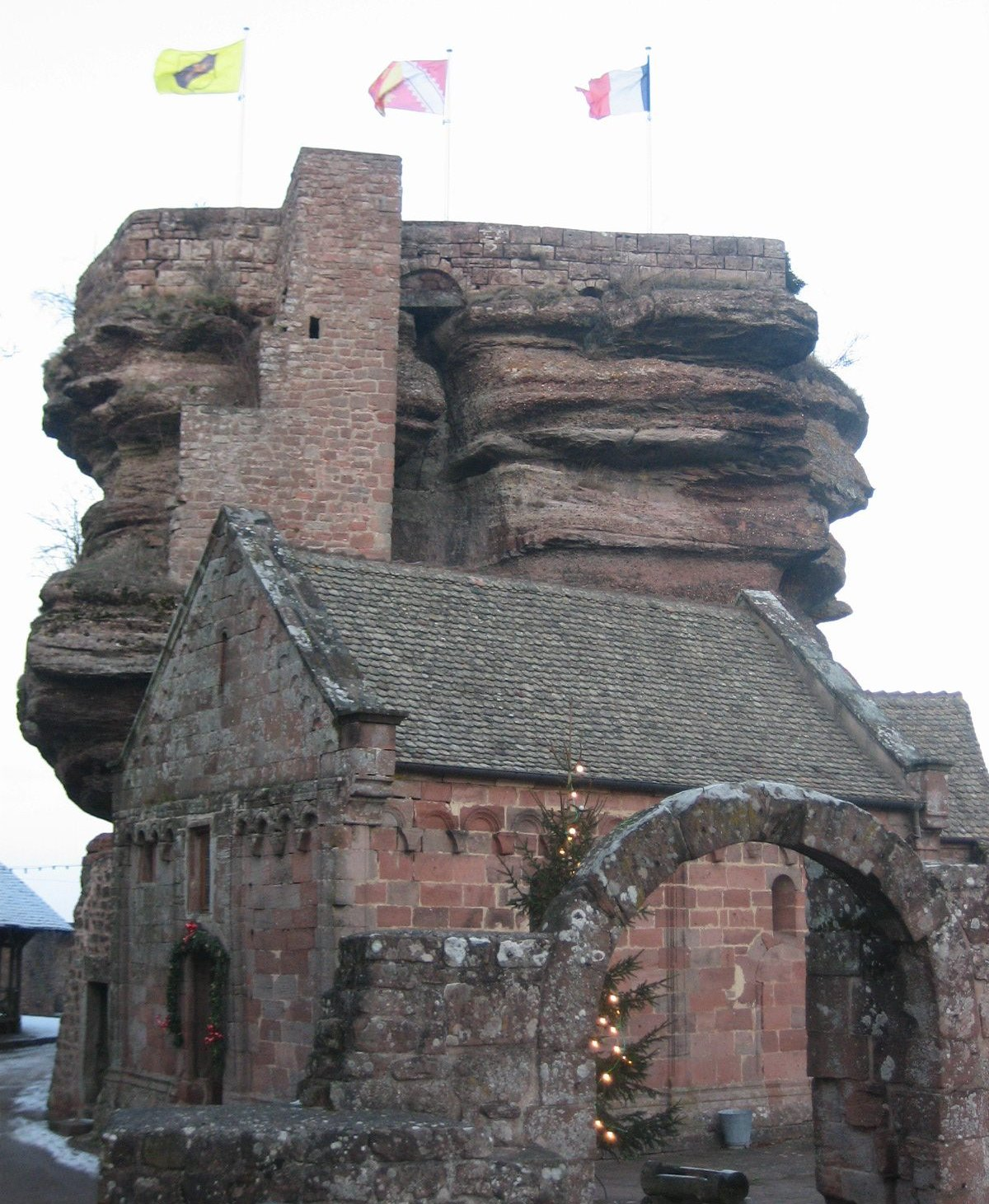
Rock of Hohbarr

The Château de Hohbarr (French: Haut-Barr; German: Burg Hohbarr) is a medieval castle, first built in 1100, above the city of Saverne in what is now the French département of Bas-Rhin. It was built on sandstone rock 460m above the valley of Zorn and the plain of Alsace. Because of this, it has been called the eye of Alsace.

On several occasions it was expanded by the bishops of Strasbourg.

The Peace of Westphalia mandated the destruction of several castles, including Hohbarr, but after the beginning of the War of the Spanish Succession, in 1701, the fortress was back in use. It was abandoned around 1770, but the vault continued to be occupied until the French Revolution.

Hohbarr has been listed as a monument historique by the French Ministry of Culture since 1874.

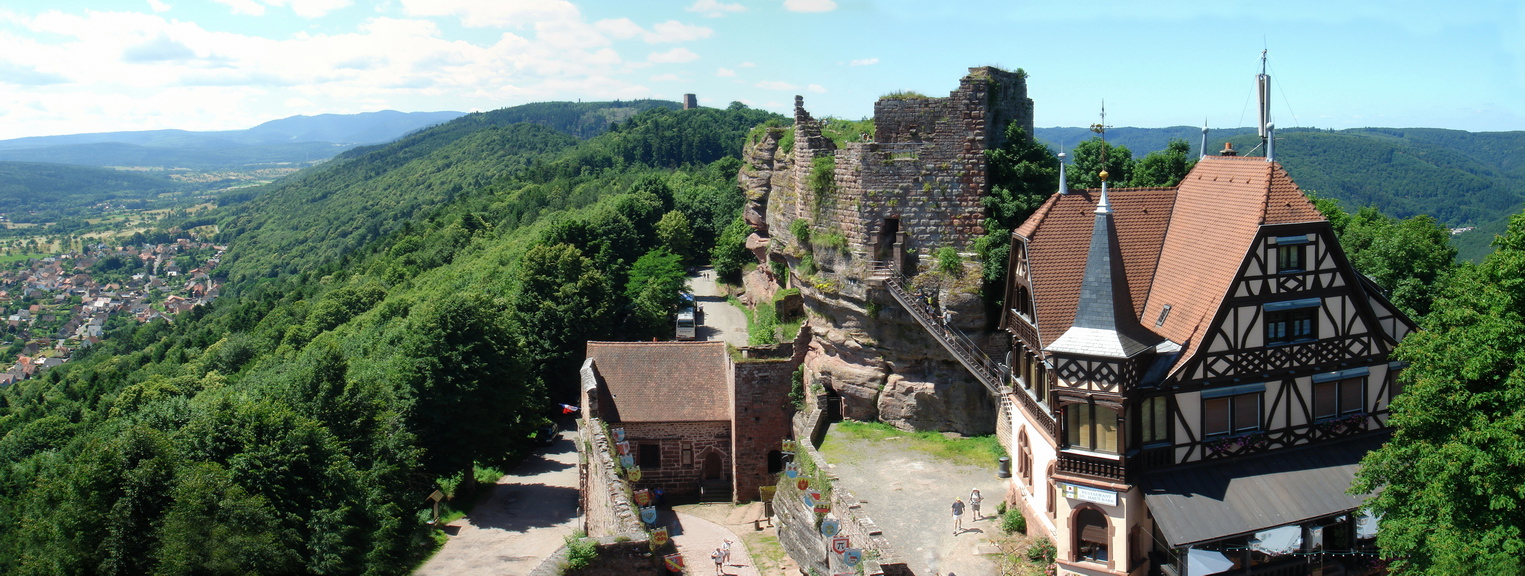
The ruins of the castle

== See also ==
- List of castles in France
