= Thal-Marmoutier =

- Commune
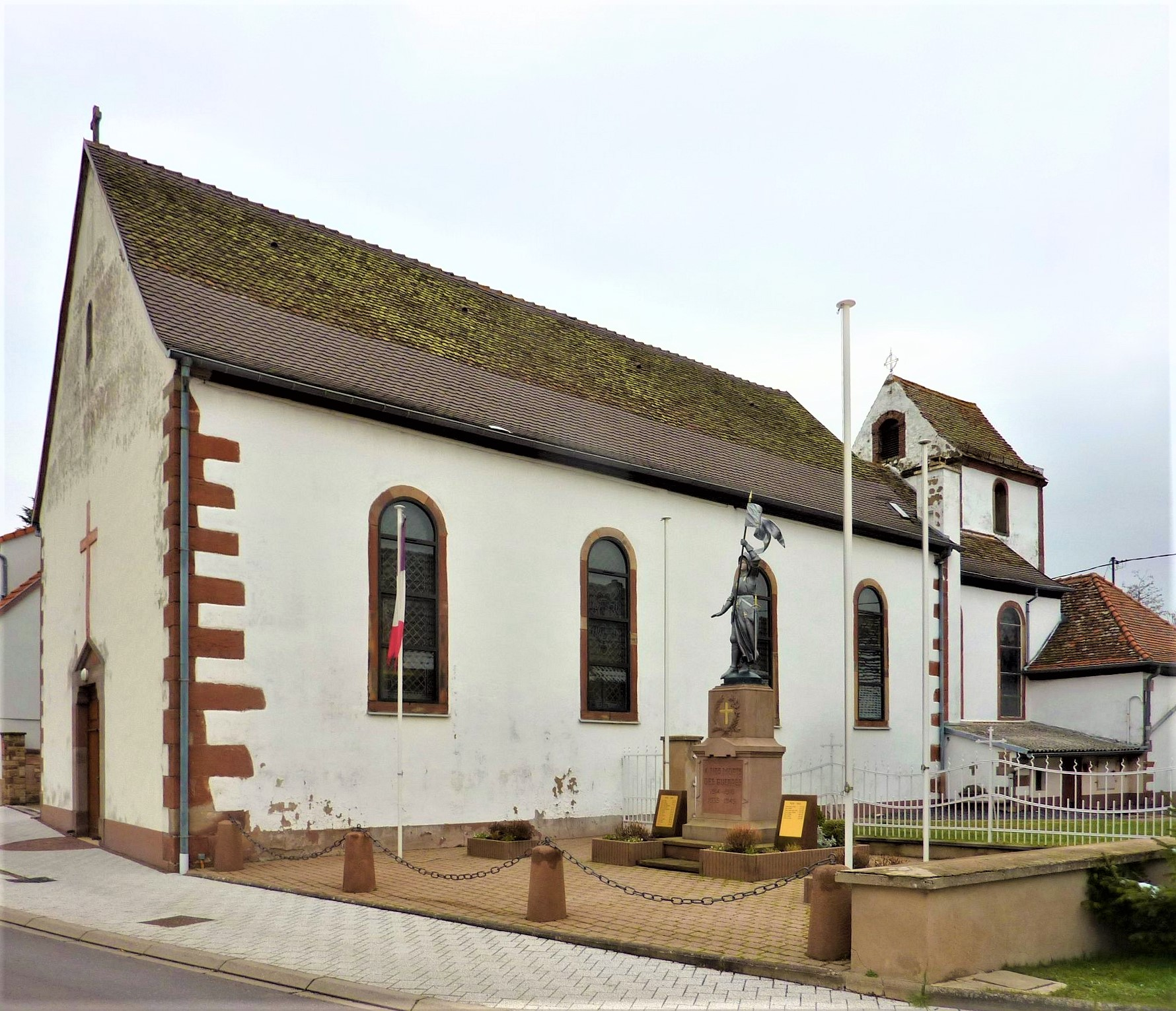
- The church in Thal-Marmoutier

- Coat of arms
- Location of Thal-Marmoutier
- Location within France Location within Grand Est
- Coordinates: 48°42′11″N 7°21′11″E
- Country: France
- Region: Grand Est
- Department: Bas-Rhin
- Arrondissement: Saverne
- Canton: Saverne
- Intercommunality: Pays de Saverne

Government
  - Mayor (2020–2026): Jean-Claude Distel
- Area^{1}: 3.42 km^{2} (1.32 sq mi)
- Highest elevation: 332 m (1,089 ft)
- Lowest elevation: 203 m (666 ft)
- Population (2023): 826
  - Density: 242/km^{2} (626/sq mi)
- Time zone: UTC+01:00 (CET)
  - Summer (DST): UTC+02:00 (CEST)
- INSEE/Postal code: 67489 /67440
- ^{1} French Land Register data, which excludes lakes, ponds, glaciers > 1 km^{2} (0.386 sq mi or 247 acres) and river estuaries.

Thal-Marmoutier (French pronunciation: [tal maʁmutje]; German: Thal bei Maursmünster) is a commune in the Bas-Rhin department in Grand Est in north-eastern France.

== See also ==
- Communes of the Bas-Rhin department
