= Reinhardsmunster =

- Commune
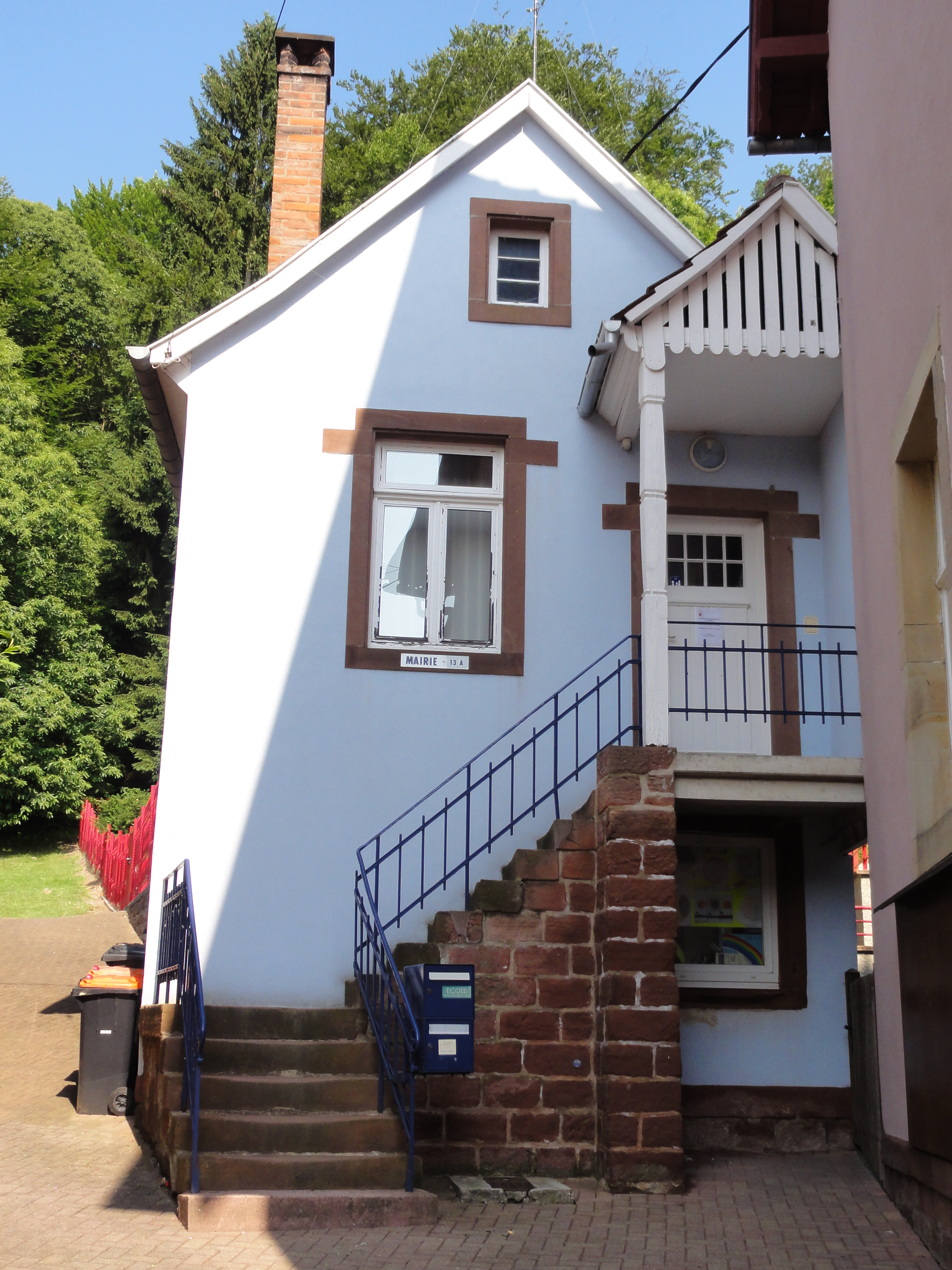
- The town hall in Reinhardsmunster

- Coat of arms
- Location of Reinhardsmunster
- Location within France Location within Grand Est
- Coordinates: 48°40′36″N 7°19′03″E
- Country: France
- Region: Grand Est
- Department: Bas-Rhin
- Arrondissement: Saverne
- Canton: Saverne
- Intercommunality: Pays de Saverne

Government
  - Mayor (2020–2026): Bruno Kister
- Area^{1}: 18.63 km^{2} (7.19 sq mi)
- Highest elevation: 624 m (2,047 ft)
- Lowest elevation: 240 m (790 ft)
- Population (2023): 430
  - Density: 23/km^{2} (60/sq mi)
- Time zone: UTC+01:00 (CET)
  - Summer (DST): UTC+02:00 (CEST)
- INSEE/Postal code: 67391 /67440
- ^{1} French Land Register data, which excludes lakes, ponds, glaciers > 1 km^{2} (0.386 sq mi or 247 acres) and river estuaries.

Reinhardsmunster (German: Reinhardsmünster) is a commune in the Bas-Rhin department in Grand Est in north-eastern France.

== See also ==
- Communes of the Bas-Rhin department
