= Marmoutier =

Marmoutier Màschmínschter
- Commune
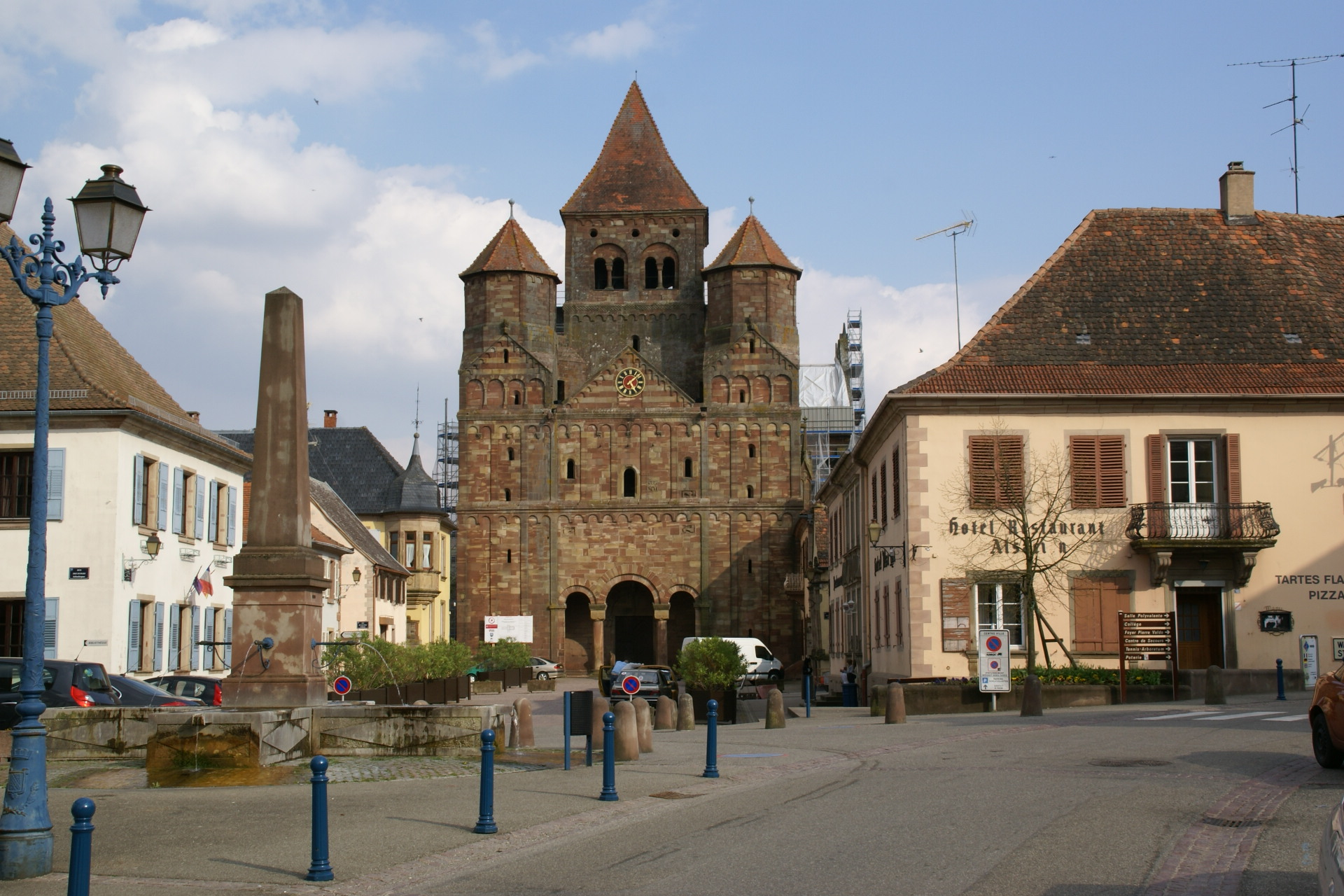
- Former abbey church of Marmoutier Abbey

- Coat of arms
- Location of Marmoutier
- Location within France Location within Grand Est
- Coordinates: 48°41′N 7°23′E
- Country: France
- Region: Grand Est
- Department: Bas-Rhin
- Arrondissement: Saverne
- Canton: Saverne
- Intercommunality: Pays de Saverne

Government
  - Mayor (2020–2026): Jean-Claude Weil
- Area^{1}: 14.07 km^{2} (5.43 sq mi)
- Elevation: 210 m (690 ft)
- Highest elevation: 367 m (1,204 ft)
- Lowest elevation: 188 m (617 ft)
- Population (2023): 2,699
  - Density: 191.8/km^{2} (496.8/sq mi)
- Time zone: UTC+01:00 (CET)
  - Summer (DST): UTC+02:00 (CEST)
- INSEE/Postal code: 67283 /67440
- ^{1} French Land Register data, which excludes lakes, ponds, glaciers > 1 km^{2} (0.386 sq mi or 247 acres) and river estuaries.

See Marmoutier Abbey (Tours) for the former abbey in Tours.

Marmoutier (French pronunciation: [maʁmutje]; German: Maursmünster) is a commune in the Bas-Rhin département in Grand Est in north-eastern France. The origin of the place is the former Marmoutier Abbey, of which the abbey church still serves as the parish church.

== Geography ==
Marmoutier is in the northwest of Alsace, located between Saverne and Wasselonne and approximately 30 kilometers away from Strasbourg.

== Population ==
Historical population
Year	Pop.	±% p.a.
1968	1,789	—
1975	1,948	+1.22%
1982	2,024	+0.55%
1990	2,235	+1.25%
1999	2,436	+0.96%
2007	2,688	+1.24%
2012	2,737	+0.36%
2017	2,726	−0.08%
2023	2,699	−0.17%
Source: INSEE

== History ==
In 590 St. Leonhard, a disciple of Columbanus, founded a benedictine monastery which later was named after the abbot Maurus who modified it in the 12th century imitating the style of Hirsau. The church dates from this time. Above all the cloister flourished during the 14th century. In 1792 it disintegrated during the French Revolution.

Jacob Frey, a writer, lived in Marmoutier from 1545 as town chronicler and notary.

== Sights ==
The church of Marmoutier Abbey from the 11th century holds a pipe organ by the organ builder Andreas Silbermann. Église Saint-Blaise de Sindelsberg was built in 1584 and underwent renovation work in 1872.

== See also ==
- Communes of the Bas-Rhin department
