= Saverne =

- Subprefecture and commune
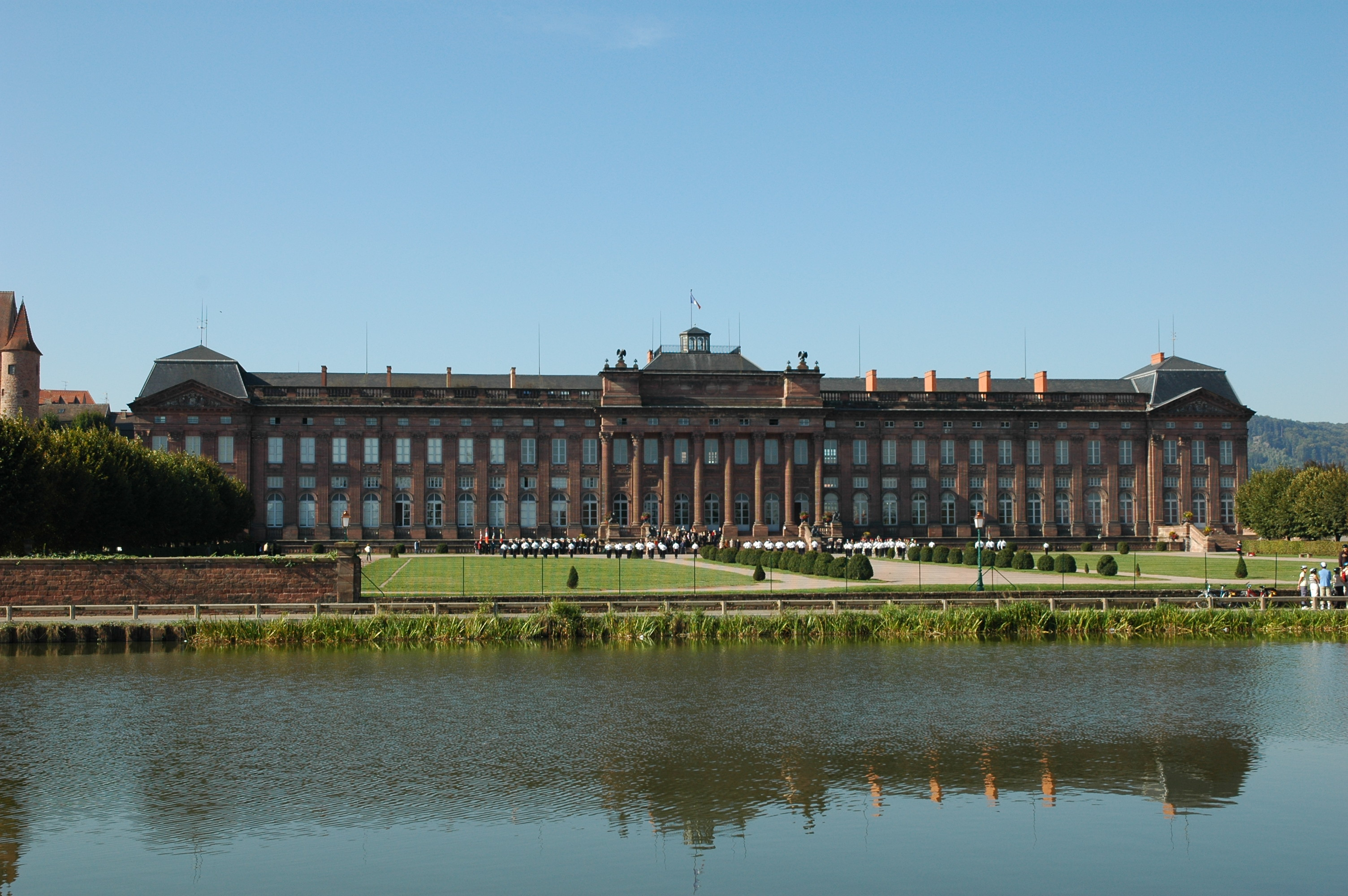
- Château des Rohan

- Coat of arms
- Location of Saverne
- Location within France Location within Grand Est
- Coordinates: 48°44′N 7°22′E
- Country: France
- Region: Grand Est
- Department: Bas-Rhin
- Arrondissement: Saverne
- Canton: Saverne
- Intercommunality: CC du Pays de Saverne

Government
  - Mayor (2020–2026): Stéphane Leyenberger (LR)
- Area^{1}: 26.01 km^{2} (10.04 sq mi)
- Elevation: 200 m (660 ft)
- Highest elevation: 463 m (1,519 ft)
- Lowest elevation: 177 m (581 ft)
- Population (2023): 11,460
  - Density: 440.6/km^{2} (1,141/sq mi)
- Time zone: UTC+01:00 (CET)
  - Summer (DST): UTC+02:00 (CEST)
- INSEE/Postal code: 67437 /67700
- ^{1} French Land Register data, which excludes lakes, ponds, glaciers > 1 km^{2} (0.386 sq mi or 247 acres) and river estuaries.

Saverne (French: Saverne, pronounced [savɛʁn]; Alsatian: Zàwere [ˈd̥sɐːvəʁə]; German: Zabern [ˈtsaːbɐn]) is a commune in the Bas-Rhin department in Grand Est in north-eastern France. It is situated on the Rhine-Marne canal at the foot of a pass over the Vosges Mountains, and 45 km (27 mi) northwest of Strasbourg.

As of 2023, the population of the commune was 11,460. Saverne is the centre of an urban area with about 19,000 inhabitants.

== Geography ==
Saverne lies on the river Zorn, at the foot of the Vosges Mountains. It is crossed by the Marne–Rhine Canal and the Paris–Strasbourg railway. The A4 autoroute (Paris–Strasbourg) passes a few kilometers north of the town. Saverne station has rail connections to Paris, Strasbourg, Metz, Nancy and several regional destinations.

== History ==
Saverne (Latin: Tres Tabernae Caesaris: Caesar's three taverns, so called because in the older days there were three inns on the way to the Lorraine plateau where they would change oxen due to the steep incline) was an important place in the time of the Roman Empire, and, after being destroyed by the Alemanni, was rebuilt by the emperor Julian.

With the settlement of the Alemanni, the town became part of the Germanosphere. After 870 AD the town belonged to East Francia, which turned into the Holy Roman Empire. During the German Peasants' War the town was occupied, in 1525, by the insurgents, who were driven out in their turn by Duke Anton of Lorraine. It suffered much from the ravages of the Thirty Years' War, but the episcopal palace, then destroyed, was subsequently rebuilt. After 1680 the town was annexed by the French. The episcopal palace was in 1852 converted by Louis Napoleon into a place of residence for widows of knights of the Legion of Honour.

Saverne was conquered by Imperial Germany after the Franco-Prussian War. It was returned to French control after World War I.

In 1913, the city was the theater of the infamous "Saverne Affair". This event gave rise to the term Zabernism (from the German name of the town), meaning abuse of military authority, or unwarranted aggression.

== Population ==
Historical population
| Year | Pop. | ±% p.a. |
|---|---|---|
| 1968 | 9,682 | — |
| 1975 | 10,170 | +0.70% |
| 1982 | 10,327 | +0.22% |
| 1990 | 10,278 | −0.06% |
| 1999 | 11,201 | +0.96% |
| 2007 | 11,966 | +0.83% |
| 2012 | 11,730 | −0.40% |
| 2017 | 11,239 | −0.85% |
| 2023 | 11,460 | +0.33% |
Source: INSEE

== Sights ==
The emblem of the town is a unicorn. Legend has it that a unicorn's horn was found in one of the nearby castles in ruins. It is more likely that a narwhal's tooth was discovered and mistaken for a unicorn's horn. However, it gave its name to the local beer (fr: Bière de la Licorne) and to the Karlsbräu brewery (f: Brasserie la Licorne) making it.

Its principal building, the Rohan Castle (Château des Rohan), is the former residence of the bishops of Strasbourg, rebuilt by Cardinal de Rohan in 1779, it was used by the Germans as barracks. It now houses the city museum with its large archeological collection of Roman and Celtic artifacts, a hostel, a small arts and crafts museum as well as the collection of 20th century and ethnological art donated by feminist journalist and politician Louise Weiss.

Other sights include the 15th century former castle (Château vieux) and the adjacent 15th century Roman Catholic parish church of Notre-Dame-de-la-Nativité with fine stained glass and sculptures; a Gothic former Franciscan, then Récollets, monastery with a church and a cloister ornated by 17th-century frescoes; as well as several old houses, among which the heavily decorated Maison Katz stands out.

In the vicinity are the ruined castles of Haut-Barr, Grand Geroldseck, Ochsenstein and Greifenstein. Hence a road, immortalized by Goethe in Dichtung und Wahrheit, leads across the Vosges to Pfalzburg. The mountain pass (Col de Saverne) contains a vast botanical garden, the Jardin botanique du col de Saverne.

Saverne is also known for its Rose Garden, locally known as La roseraie. It is also the host of the International Contest of New Roses every year. The Garden itself blesses visitors with over 550 varieties of roses.

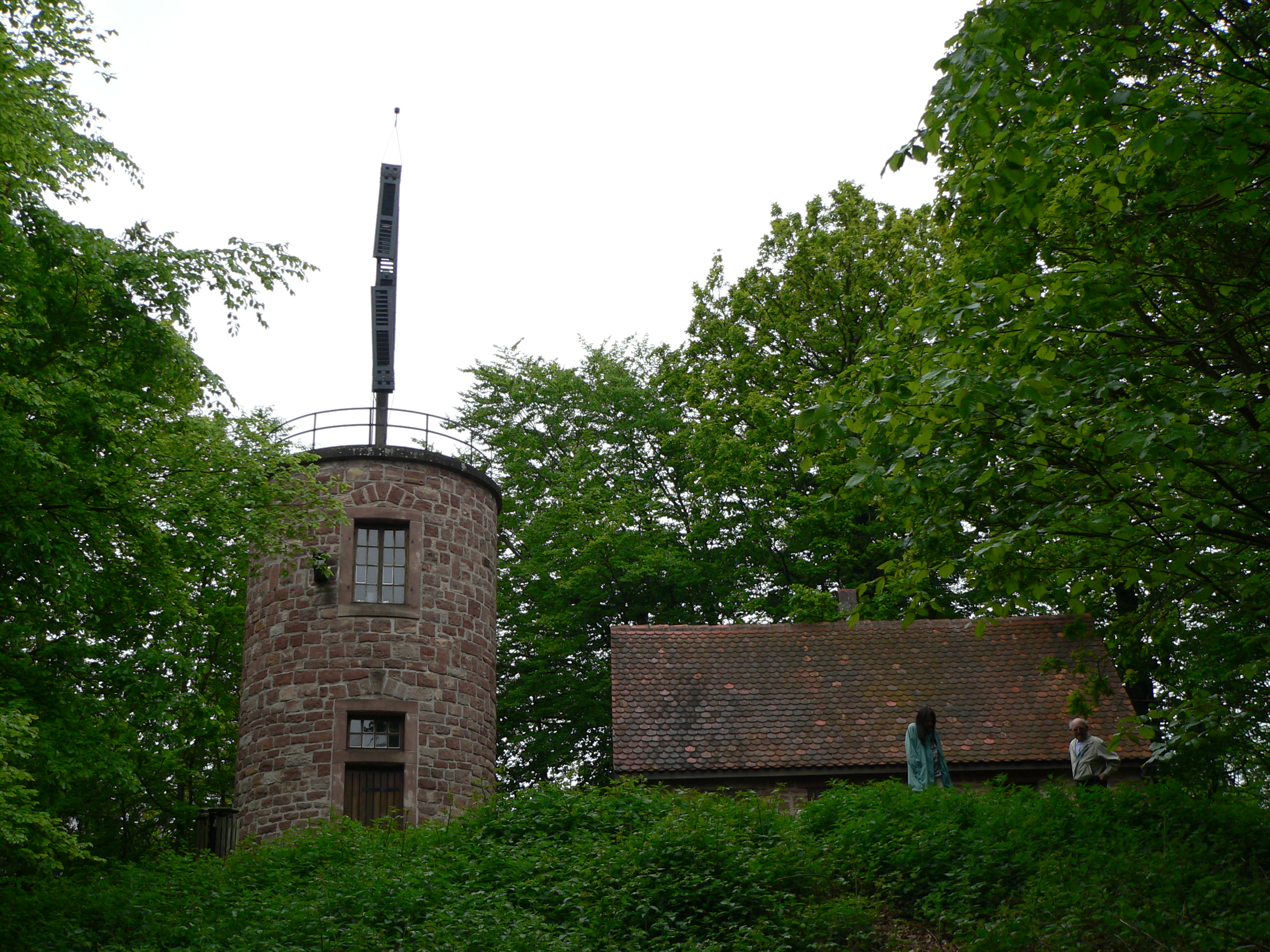
The Chappe semaphore tower near Saverne, France

An old semaphore tower, from the former Landau (and later Strasbourg) to Paris semaphore line, can be seen in the vicinity. It was one of the 50 stations built by the first French Empire on this line which was the second of this kind in France.

== Notable people ==
- Paul Acker (1874–1916), writer, author of popular novels
- Émile Blessig (born 1947), politician
- Jacques-Frédéric (1775–1833) and François Joseph Français (1768–1810), engineers and mathematicians of the revolutionary era
- Venerable Francis Libermann (1802–1852), the son of the Chief Rabbi of Saverne. He converted to Catholicism in 1826 and later became known as "The Second Founder of The Holy Ghost Fathers".
- Franz Xaver Murschhauser (1663–1738), composer and organist
- Gérard Oberlé (born 1945), writer and bibliographer
- Georges Reeb (1920–1993), mathematician
- Adrien Zeller (1940–2009), French politician (UMP)

== See also ==
- Communes of the Bas-Rhin department
- Oppidum du Fossé des Pandours
