= List of castles in Alsace =

This list of castles in Alsace is a list of medieval castles or château forts in the region in northern France.

Alsace comprises two departments, Bas-Rhin and Haut-Rhin, by the order of which this list is organised.

== Bas-Rhin ==
| Name | Date | Condition | Image | Ownership / Access | Notes |
|---|---|---|---|---|---|
| Château d'Andlau | 1246-1264 | Ruins | | | |
| Château du Bernstein | 11-15th century | Ruins | | | |
| Château du Birkenfels | c.1260 | Ruins | | | |
| Château de Dreistein | 13-14th century | Ruins | | | Comprises 3 separate castles. |
| Château du Fleckenstein | 13-16th century | Ruins | | | |
| Château du Frankenbourg | 12th century | Ruins | | | Original building attributed to Clovis I. |
| Château du Freudeneck | c.1300 | Ruins | | | |
| Château de Frœnsbourg | 13-14th century | Ruins | | | Destroyed by the French in 1677, probably already abandoned at that time. |
| Château du Grand-Geroldseck | 12-15th century | Ruins | | | |
| Château de Greifenstein | 12-14th century | Ruins | | | Comprises 2 castles, separated by a ditch. |
| Château de Guirbaden | 11th century | Ruins | | | |
| Château du Hagelschloss | 13th century | Ruins | | | Also known as Château de Waldsberg. |
| Château de Hohbarr | c.1100 | Ruins | | | |
| Château du Haut-Kœnigsbourg | 12-15th century | Reconstructed | | | Abandoned after Thirty Years' War, restored after 1900 under the direction of Wilhelm II of Germany. |
| Château de Herrenstein | 11-16th century | Ruins | | | |
| Château de Hohenbourg | 12-16th century | Ruins | | | Destroyed by Joseph de Montclar in 1680. |
| Château de Hohenfels | 13th century | Ruins | | | |
| Château de Hohenstein | 13th century | Ruins | | | |
| Château de Kagenfels | 13-16th century | Ruins | | | Ruined by 1664. |
| Château de Kintzheim | 13-15th century | Ruins | | | |
| Château du Landsberg | 13th century | Ruins | | | |
| Château de Lichtenberg | 13-16th century | Ruins | | | Reduced to ruins through artillery fire in 1870. |
| Château de Lœwenstein | 13th century | Fragmentary ruins | | | |
| Château de Lutzelbourg | 13th century | Ruins | | | |
| Château de Lutzelhardt | 13th century | Ruins | | | Ruined by 1538. |
| Château du Nideck | 13th century | Ruins | | | Destroyed by fire 1636. |
| Château d'Ochsenstein | 12th century | Ruins | | | Comprises 3 separate castles. |
| Château d'Osthoffen | 13th century | Reconstructed | | | Converted to Renaissance château. |
| Château de l'Ortenbourg | 13th century | Ruins | | | |
| Château du Petit-Arnsberg | 14th century | Ruins | | | |
| Château de La Petite-Pierre | 12th century | Rebuilt | | | Developed as residence, keep destroyed 19th century. |
| Château du Petit-Geroldseck | 13th century | Ruins | | | |
| Château de Ramstein (Bas-Rhin) | 13-14th century | Ruins | | | Several hundred metres from Château de l'Ortenbourg. |
| Château du Grand Ringelstein | 13th century | Ruins | | | |
| Château du Petit-Ringelstein | Unknown | Fragmentary remains | | | |
| Château de la Roche | 13th century | Ruins | | | |
| Château de Salm | 13-14th century | Ruins | | | |
| Château de Schœneck | 13-16th century | Ruins | | | Destroyed in 1680 by French troops. |
| Château de Spesbourg | 1246-1250 | Ruins | | | |
| Château du Vieux-Windstein | 12-14th century | Ruins | | | |
| Château de Wangenbourg | 13th century | Ruins | | | |
| Château du Wasenbourg | c.1275 | Ruins | | | |
| Château du Wasigenstein | 13th century | Ruins | | | Associated with the German legend of Waltharius. |
| Château de Wineck | c.1300 | Ruins | | | |
| Château de Wittschloessel | 13th century | Fragmentary remains | | | |

== Haut-Rhin ==
Castles of which only vestiges or nothing remains include Château d'Altkirch, Château de Meywihr and Château de Wildenstein.

| Name | Date | Condition | Image | Ownership / Access | Notes |
|---|---|---|---|---|---|
| Château de Buchenek | 13-16th century | Restored | | Owned by commune | Houses municipal museum |
| Château d'Échéry | 13th century | Ruins | | | |
| Châteaux d'Eguisheim (fr) | 11-13th century | Ruins | | | Comprises the three castles of Dagsbourg, Weckmund and Wahlenbourg, shared with Husseren-les-Châteaux |
| Château de Ferrette | c.1100 | Ruins | | | |
| Château du Girsberg | 13th century | Ruins | | | |
| Château du Haut-Ribeaupierre | 11th century | Ruins | | | |
| Château de Hohenack | | Ruins | | | |
| Château du Hohlandsbourg | 1279 | Ruins | | | Destroyed 1637. |
| Château du Hugstein | 13-15th century | Ruins | | | |
| Château de Kaysersberg | 13-15th century | Ruins | | | |
| Château de Landskron | 13-17th century | Ruins | | | Rebuilt by Vauban after 1665. |
| Château de Morimont | 13-16th century | Ruins | | | |
| Château de Pflixbourg | 1212-9 | Ruins | | | |
| Château de Reichenstein (Kientzheim) | | | | | |
| Château de Reichenstein (Riquewihr) | | Ruins | | | |
| Château de Saint-Ulrich | 12-15th century | Ruins | | | One of three castles (with the Girsberg and the Haut-Ribeaupierre) which dominate the commune of Ribeauvillé. |
| Château du Wineck | 11-13th century | Ruins | | | |

== See also ==
- List of castles in France
- List of châteaux in France
