= Château de Wittschloessel =

French historical monument

Coordinates: 49°01′22″N 7°40′47″E

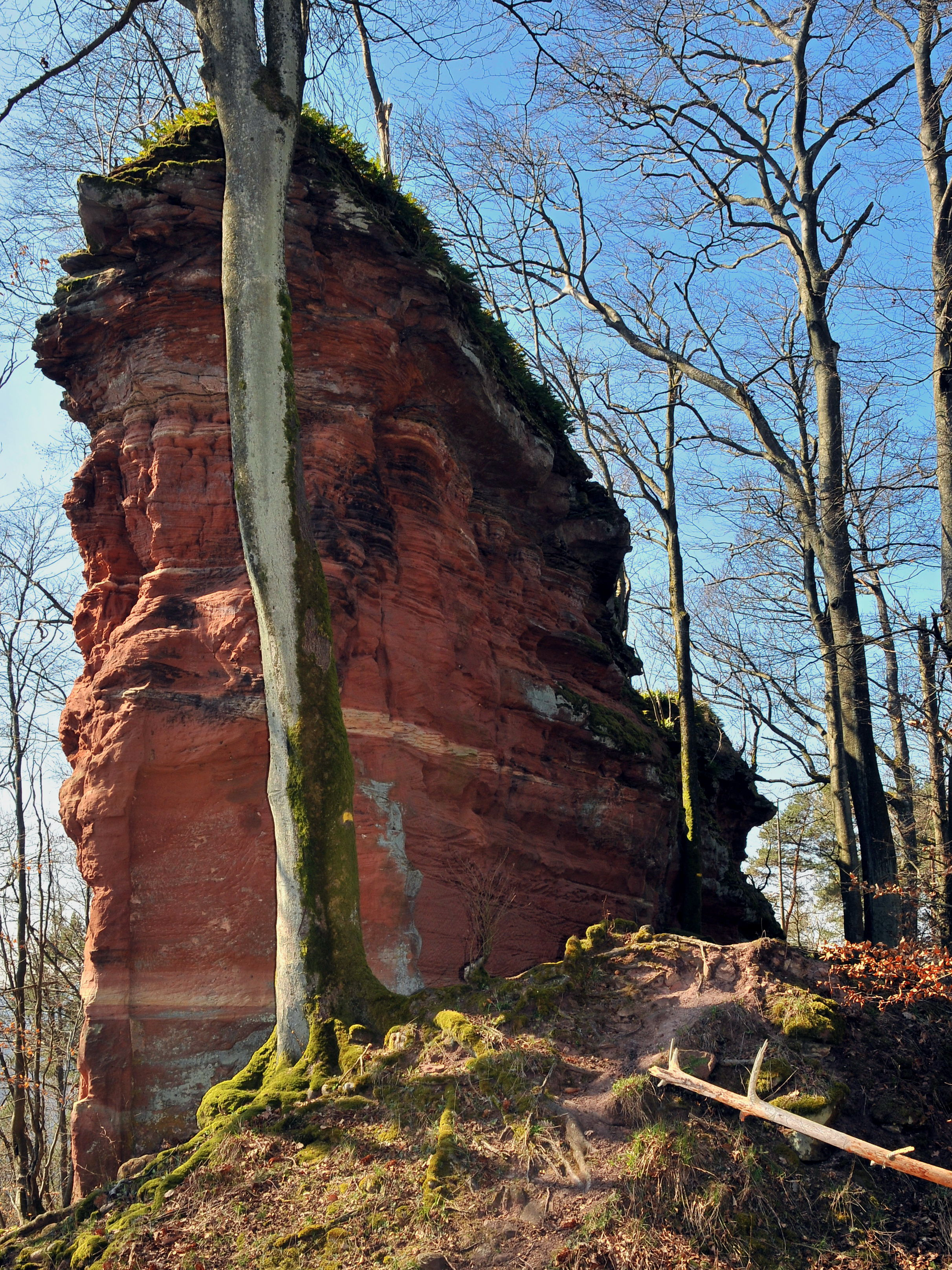
Wittschloessel

The Château de Wittschlœssel is a ruined castle situated in the commune of Dambach, in the French département of Bas-Rhin. The location, a place called Wittschlœssel, means small lock in German.

== History ==
Built in the 13th century with the name "Schmalenstein", the castle is more of a guard tower, dominating the valley of Obersteinbach. It became a small fort, completing the security of the nearby Château de Schœneck.

The only written record of the castle is from 1657 in a description of the limits of sovereignty, the castle being in the possession of the lords of Lichtenberg and later the Eckbrechts of Dürckheim.

Destroyed in 1677 along with the Château de Schœneck, little is known of the history of the castle.

== Ruins ==
On a rocky crest (altitude 440 m), nothing remains of the castle apart from ruined sandstone walls. The ruin consists of two rocks on the summit of the mountain. Between the two rocks is a ruined room. Holes for beams can be seen in the rocks as well as the partition of a slanting building.

The castle is listed as a monument historique by the French Ministry of Culture.

== See also ==
List of castles in France
