= Ortenburg =

Ortenburg may refer to:

- Ortenburg, Bavaria, a market town in Bavaria, Germany
- Ortenburg-Neuortenburg, state of the Holy Roman Empire
- Counts of Ortenburg, comital dynasty in the Duchy of Carinthia
- Burgruine Ortenburg, castle ruin in Carinthia, Austria
- Château de l'Ortenbourg, castle ruin in Alsace, France
