= Château de Lutzelhardt =

13th-century castle in Obersteinbach in the Bas-Rhin département, France

Coordinates: 49°02′44″N 7°39′20″E

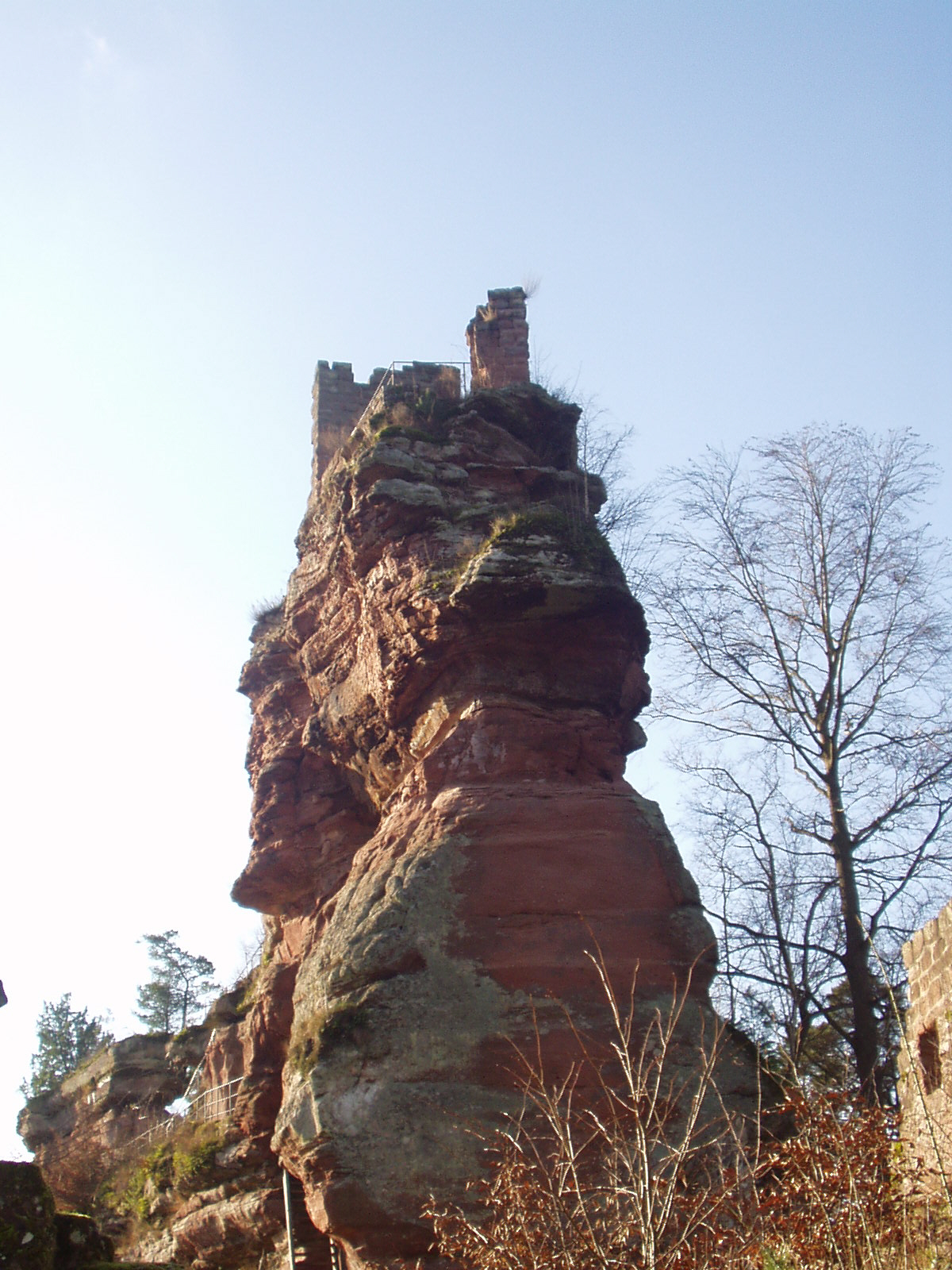
Port of the château's ruins

The Château de Lutzelhardt is a 13th-century castle in the commune of Obersteinbach in the Bas-Rhin département, France. It is remarkable in that parts of it are actually built into the rock (semi-troglodytic).

== History ==
According to studies by B. Metz and T. Biller, the first mention of the castle goes back to 1250. This date certainly corresponds with the approximate date of its construction by the Lutzelhardt family, after who the castle is named. The Lutzelhardts, who were Vögte of Wasselonne, sold the castle in 1363 to the Fleckensteins. It was burnt in 1397 by the troops of the city of Strasbourg, taken by assault in 1462 by the troops of Wissembourg and was certainly repaired by 1469.

The exact date of its abandonment is not known, but it was recorded as a ruin in 1538.

== Description ==
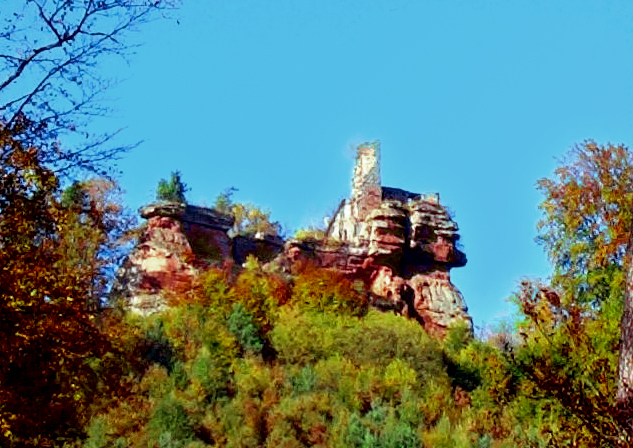
The ruins of Château de Lutzelhardt

The castle is built on an outcrop of sandstone, twenty metres (~65 ft) high and sixty metres (~195 ft) long. At its feet, on the south-east, is the lower courtyard. On the highest part of the rock are the remains of a small square keep, with dressed stones, and the remains of a residence along the eastern edge of the rock. The north wall still stands to the height of the ground floor. The other parts of the castle are slightly lower. They consist of a cistern, a well or second cistern, and traces of various buildings. In the lower courtyard there are remnants of sections of the curtain wall with the doorway on one side and mounds on the other, two massive cellars cut into rock (one having been vaulted) and a staircase in the rock giving access to the castle proper. On the opposite side of the castle to the lower courtyard, a ditch has been dug the length of the rock. Further west are remains of walls.

The Château de Lutzelhardt has been listed since 1898 as a monument historique by the French Ministry of Culture.

== See also ==
- Château du Petit-Arnsberg
- Château du Fleckenstein
- List of castles in France
