= Château de Wineck =

Ruined castle in Dambach in the Bas-Rhin département of France

Coordinates: 49°0′50″N 7°39′44″E

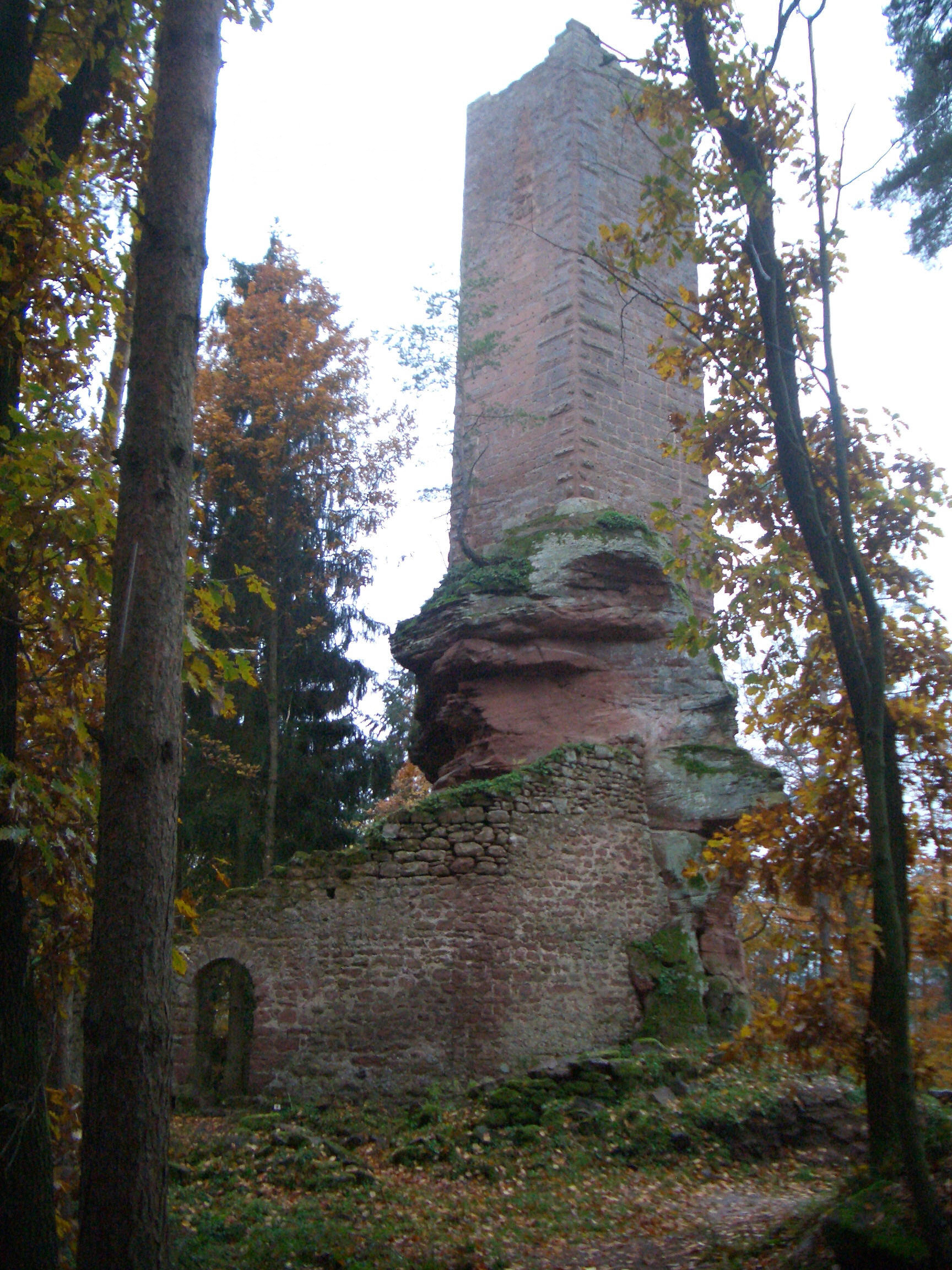
The Château de Wineck

The Château de Wineck is a ruined castle in the Wineckerthal quarter of the commune of Dambach in the Bas-Rhin département of France. It has been listed since 1985 as a monument historique by the French Ministry of Culture.

== History ==
The castle was built around 1300 for the Windstein family. It was without doubt intended as an observation post to complete the defensive system of the nearby Château de Schœneck.

It was dismantled at the end of the 17th century on the orders of the King of France.

Built on a rocky peak, all that remains of the castle are part of the dressed stone walls and the corners of the polygonal keep, serving originally to protect a modest home that has since disappeared.

The castle is reached through a gallery cut into the rock, with a door halfway up the cliff. The lower courtyard, on the eastern side, is enclosed by a partly conserved enceinte.

== See also ==
- List of castles in France
