= Wildenstein Castle =

Wildenstein Castle (German: Schloss Wildenstein) may refer to the following castles:

- Château de Wildenstein, ruined castle in the Alsace region of France, situated in the commune of Kruth in the Haut-Rhin département
- Wildenstein Castle (Bubendorf), castle in the municipality of Bubendorf in the canton of Basel-Land in Switzerland
- Wildenstein Castle (Leibertingen), a castle in Baden-Württemberg, Germany
- Wildenstein Castle (Palatinate), a ruined castle in Donnersbergkreis, Rhineland-Palatinate, Germany
- Wildenstein Castle (Aargau) in the Swiss Canton of Aargau
- Wildenstein Castle (Eschau) in German state of Bavaria
- Wildenstein Castle (Fichtenau) in the German state of Baden-Württemberg
