= Château de Ramstein, Bas-Rhin =

Ruined castle in Bas-Rhin, France

Coordinates: 48°17′40″N 7°23′18″E

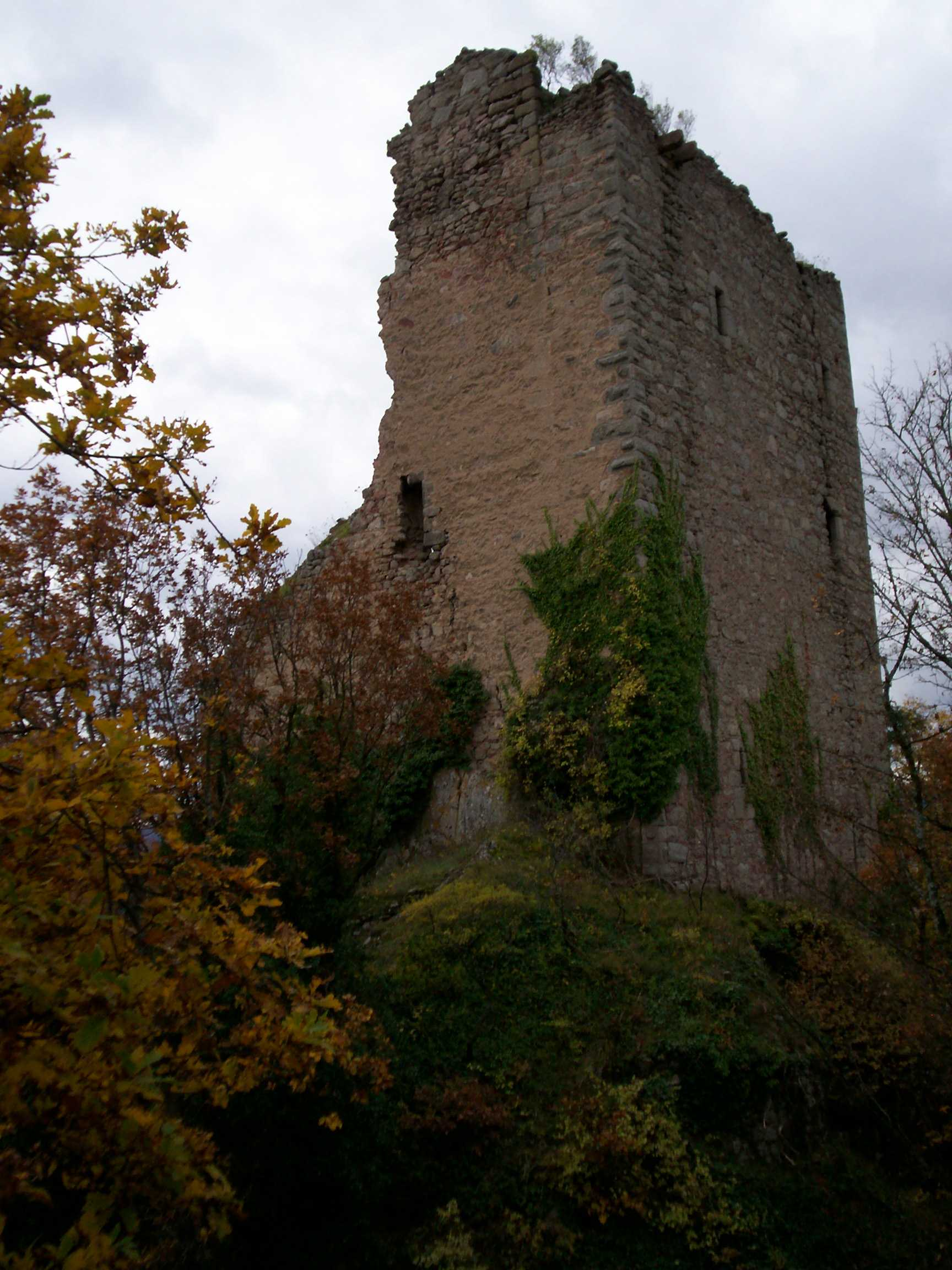
Castle of Ramstein

The Château de Ramstein is a ruined castle in the commune of Scherwiller, in the Bas-Rhin département of France. Its name is probably derived from the German Ram (crow) and Stein (stone) and signifies 'rock of the crow'.

The Château de Ramstein is built on the same crest as the Château de l'Ortenbourg. Standing at an altitude of 384 m, it is dominated by the Château de l'Ortenbourg from which it is separated by a few hundred metres.

It was built around 1293 as a rear base during the siege of Château de l'Ortenbourg by Otto von Ochenstein, during the conflict between Adolf of Nassau and Albert of Habsburg. Originally built as a simple tower to support a siege engine, it grew at the start of the 14th century into a true castle with the strengthening of the tower and an extra wall. In 1421, it was attacked and pillaged by Strasbourg. It was destroyed in 1633 by the Swedes during the Thirty Years' War. At the start of the 19th century it became the property of baron Mathieu de Fabvier, who also owned Ortenbourg. Today, all that remains are the exterior wall and two turrets, built of granite.

Because of the risk of landslides, the castle has been closed to visitors since 1983.

The castle has been listed as monument historique by the French Ministry of Culture since 1924. It is the property of the commune.

== Bibliography ==
- Jean Braun : Circuit des châteaux forts d'Alsace - Ingersheim : éd. SAEP, 1978 - collection Delta 2000.
- Bernhard Pollmann : Vosges : 50 randonnées sélectionnées dans les Vosges lorraines et alsaciennes - Munich : éd. Rother, 2003. (cf. circuit n°26, pp. 84–85)

== See also ==
- List of castles in France
