= Château de Lichtenberg =

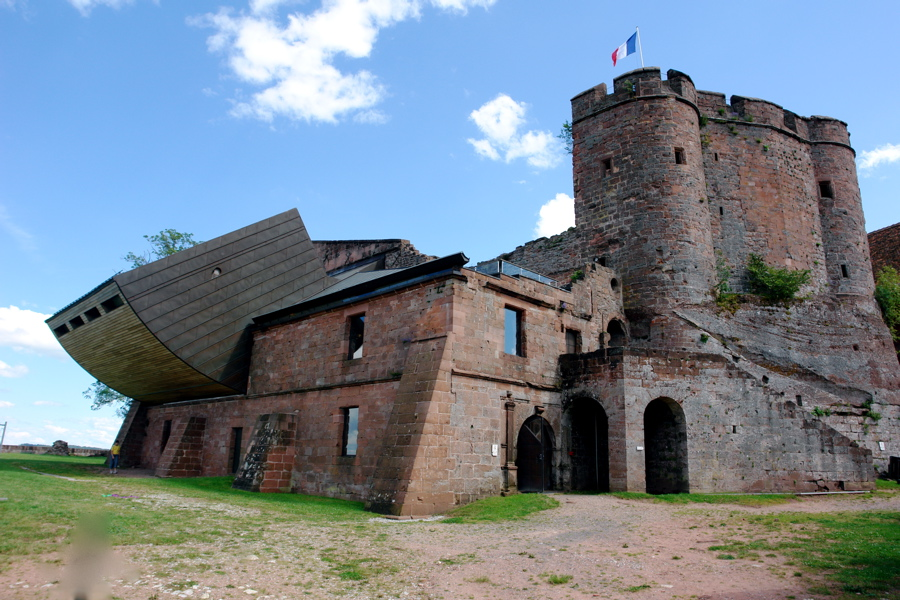

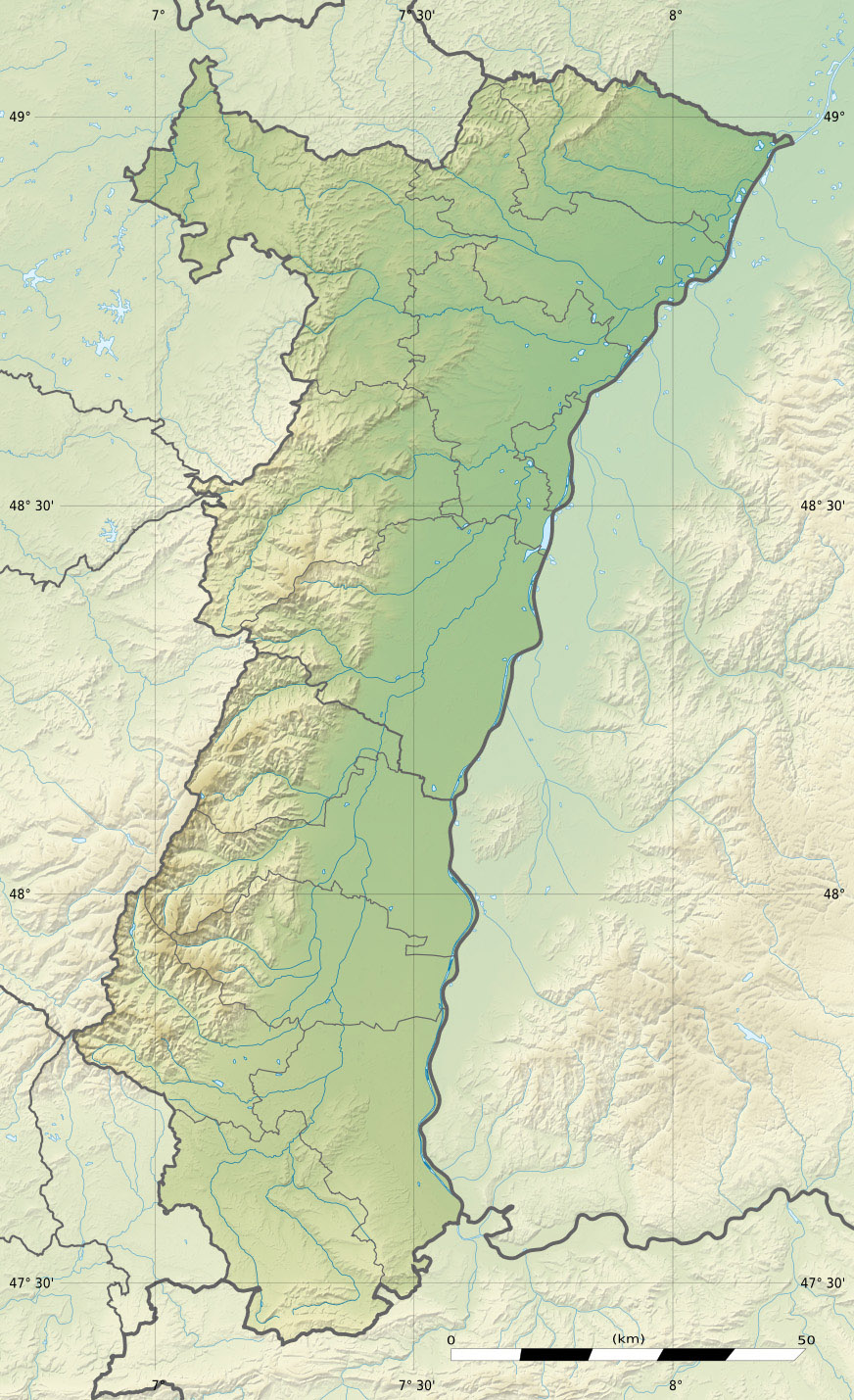
- Location within Alsace
- 48°55′16″N 7°29′14″E
- Type: castle
- Location: Lichtenberg

History
- Built: circa 1200

Site notes
- Restored: 1990s
- Current use: tourist attraction
- Owner: Commune of Lichtenberg
- Website: http://www.chateaudelichtenberg.com/index

Monument historique
- Designated: 1 May 1878
- Reference no.: PA00084776

The Château de Lichtenberg is a castle built on a singular prominence in the northern Vosges at the end of the village of Lichtenberg, Bas-Rhin department in Alsace in north-eastern France. The castle was first mentioned in 1206 and is most well known as the home of the Counts of Hanau-Lichtenberg. It was left in ruins in 1870 after bombardment by Württemberg troops during the Franco-Prussian War, but was restored in the 1990s and is open to the public.

== History ==
The castle is first mentioned in 1206, as home to the Lords of Lichtenberg. The Lichtenberg line passed to the Hanau family, who became the Counts of Hanau-Lichtenberg. In the late 16th century, Phillip IV of Hanau-Lichtenberg hired Daniel Specklin, who had designed the fortifications of Strasbourg, to turn the castle into a fortress to use and protect against a new weapon: the cannon. In 1678, the castle capitulated to French troops after an eight-day siege. Like most of the castles in the Alsace region, it came under the control of the Kingdom of France.

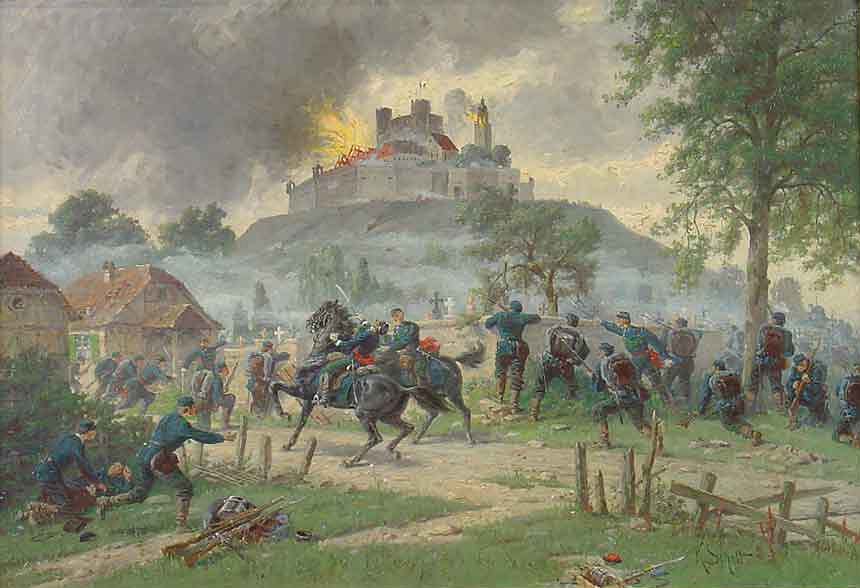
Painting of the destruction of the Château of Lichtenberg

On 7–9 August 1870, during the course of the Franco-Prussian War, the Château de Lichtenberg was bombarded by artillery of Württemberg troops. A large fire broke out on the evening of 9 August, which destroyed much of the castle and forced its capitulation. In May 1871, the surrounding region was transferred to the newly formed German Empire. The castle became a French national historic site (monument historique) on 1 May 1878, although it remained within German territory until the end of the First World War, when it was returned to France.

The ruins of the Château de Lichtenberg were left for over a century, until a 52 million-franc (€8 million) restoration effort began in the early 1990s.

From 1996, two architects, Andrea Bruno and Jean Pierre Laubal, led a long campaign of work to restore the old parts and to create a new space for cultural activities, shows and exhibitions. The castle is owned by the commune of Lichtenberg and is run by the Pays de la Petite-Pierre community of communes.

== See also ==
- List of castles in Alsace
