= Andrea Bruno =

Italian architect (1931–2025)

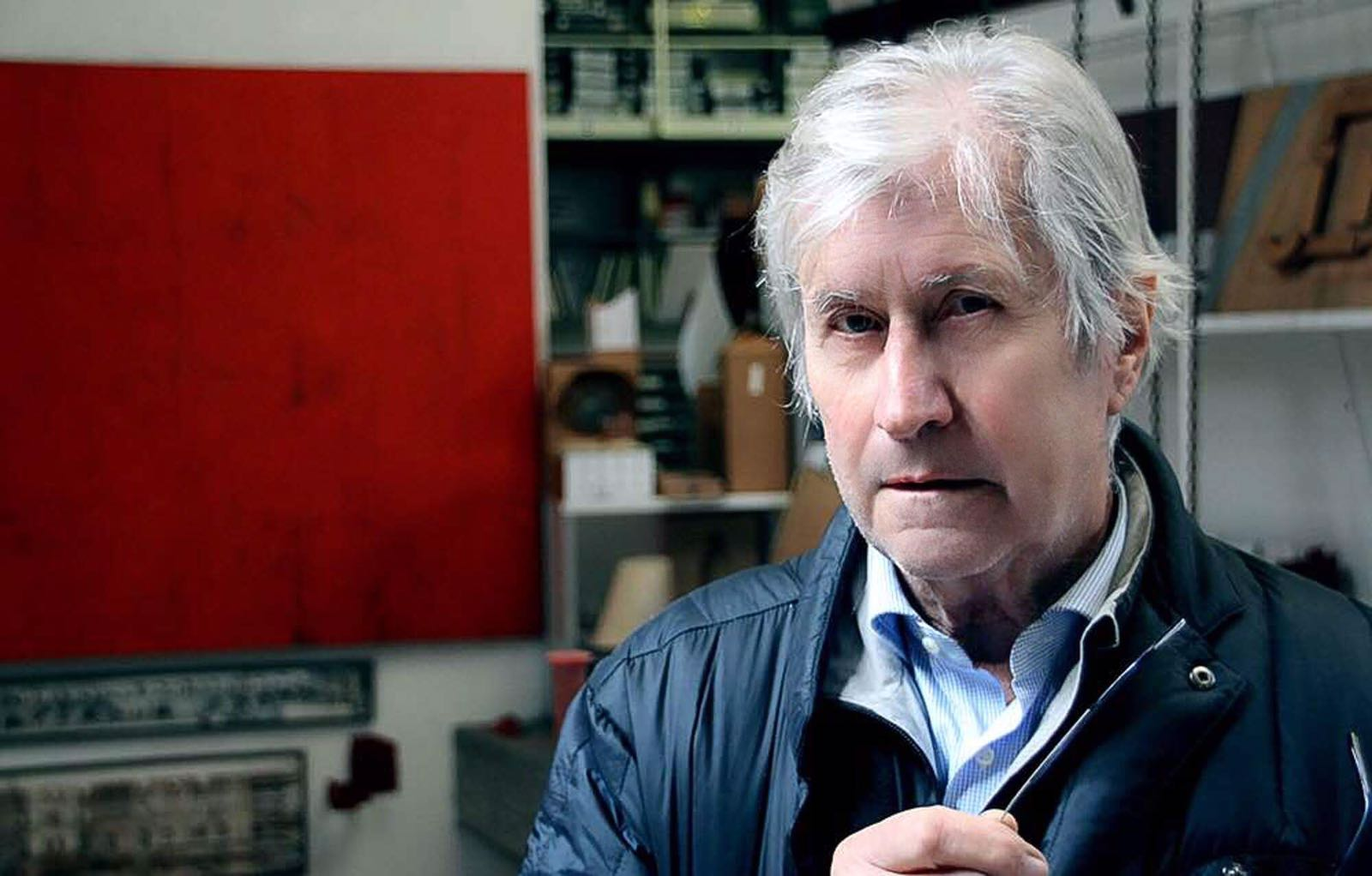
- Born: 11 January 1931; Turin, Italy
- Died: 6 July 2025 (aged 94); Turin, Italy
- Occupation: Architect

Andrea Bruno (11 January 1931 – 6 July 2025) was an Italian architect who specialised in conserving historic sites and museums.

== Life and career ==
Bruno completed his studies at the Architectural Faculty of the Istituto tecnico in Turin in 1956. He specialised in the field of architectural conservation of historic buildings, museums and public sites. Among the projects led by Bruno are the Castle of Rivoli, Bagrati Cathedral, the Museum of Modern Art in Rivoli, the Faculty of Economics at the University of Turin, the theatre Les Brigittines in Brussels, and the Château de Lichtenberg in France.

Bruno was a consultant for UNESCO beginning in 1974 on several missions in the Middle East and in Europe.

Bruno died on 6 July 2025, at the age of 94.

== Exhibitions ==
- Architetture nel tempo, Castello Cinquecentesco, Italy (2003).
- Fare, disfare, rifare architettura, Venice, Italy (2014).
- Designing the existent – from the Castle of Rivoli to the Bagarati Cathedral (2015).

== Works ==
- Museum of Nothing, The archeological museum of Maa-Palaiokastro, Coral Bay, Paphos, Cyprus (1987).

== Publications ==
- The citadel and the minarets of Herat, Afghanistan, Turin, Sirea, 1976.
- Il castello di Rivoli. 1734-1984, storia di un recupero, Turin, U. Allemandi, 1984.
- Architetture tra conservazione e riuso. Progetti e realizzazioni di Andrea Bruno a Torino, Milan, Lybra immagine, 1996.
- Il Castello di Grinzane Cavour. Un'architettura fortificata tra le vigne di Langa, (with Luigi Cabutto and Giulio Parusso), Alba, Ordine dei cavalieri del tartufo e dei vini di Alba, 2000.
- Museo della Lambretta. Storia e memoria, territorio e paesaggio, Soveria Mannelli, Calabria Letteraria, 2007.
