= Château de Hohenfels =

Castle in Dambach, Bas-Rhin, France

Coordinates: 49°00′11″N 7°36′50″E

The Château de Hohenfels is a castle situated in the commune of Dambach, in the Bas-Rhin département of France.

== History ==
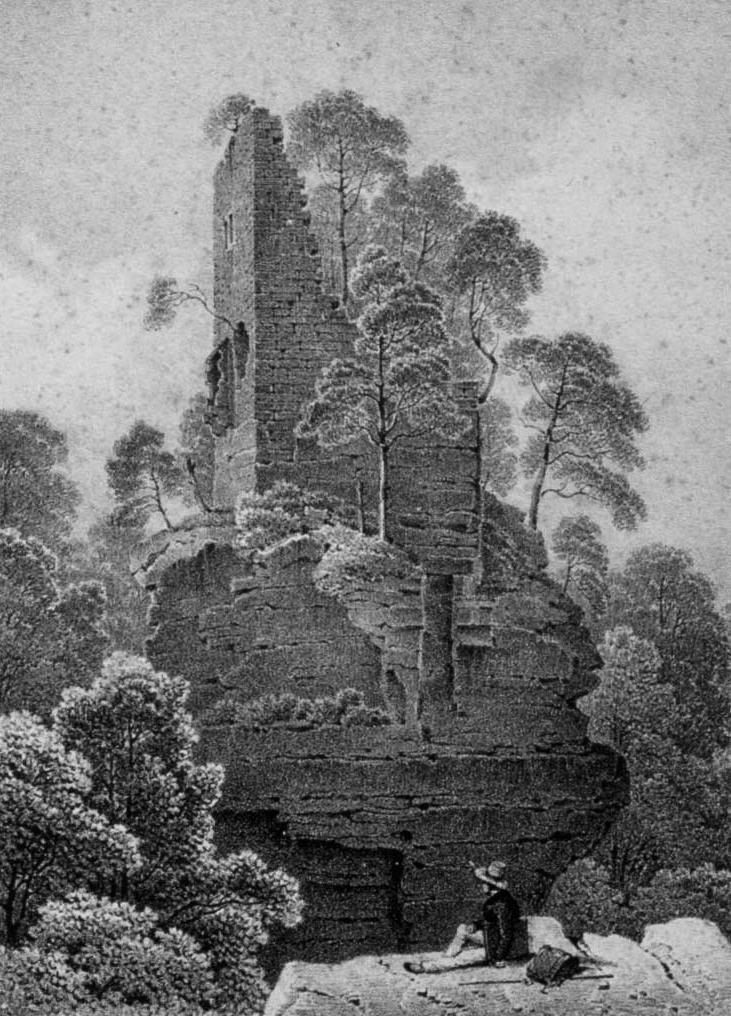
Drawing of Château de Hohenfels

The castle was built at the end of the 13th century and recorded in a document for the first time in 1293. It was destroyed by troops from Strasbourg and Haguenau in 1423, and again during the German Peasants' War in 1525.

The semi-troglodytic castle is built on a sandstone table, separated from the crest of the hill by a ditch dug into the bare rock. The castle was built with six floors and allowed surveillance of the access roads towards Lorraine. It was certainly altered in the 15th century.

== Visible remains ==
- Remains of the old wall closing the lower courtyard.
- The surrounding wall of large dressed stones.
- The cistern cut into the sandstone and its water collection system.
- Of the lower courtyard, only fragments of walls and a cistern remain.
- The western platform has kept some remains as well as a room cut out of the rock.
- The manor house, at the eastern end of the summit, has kept its north wall of dressed stones up to three levels.

Hohenfels was the first castle in Alsace to undergo properly scientific archaeological digs.

The castle has been classified since 1985 by the French Ministry of Culture as a monument historique.

== See also ==
- List of castles in France
