= Château du Petit-Arnsberg =

Castle in Bas-Rhin, Alsace, France

Coordinates: 49°02′19″N 7°41′25″E

The Château du Petit-Arnsberg is a castle situated in the commune of Obersteinbach in the Bas-Rhin département of Alsace, France. It is dated to the 14th-century.

It has been listed since 1898 as a monument historique by the French Ministry of Culture.

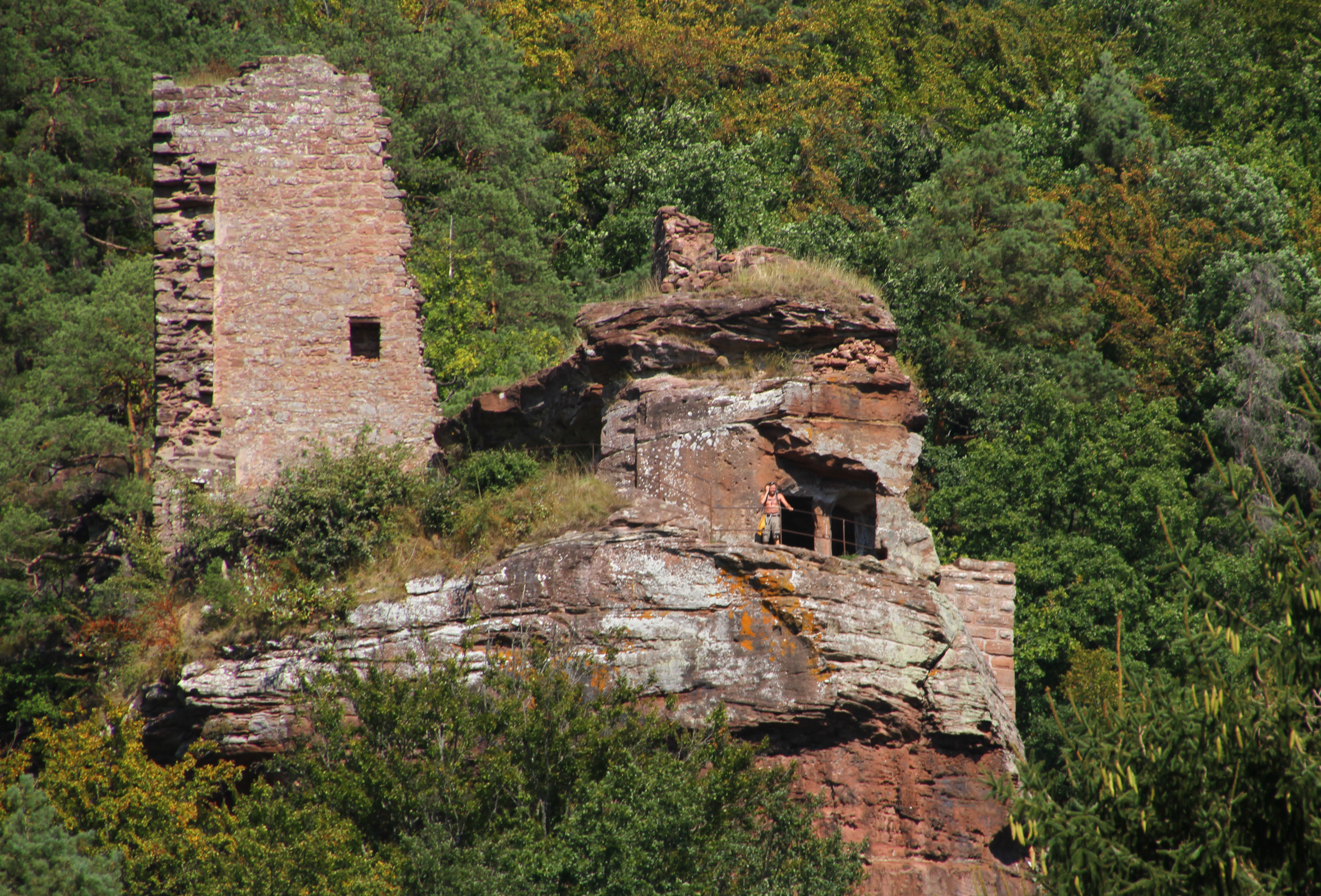
Seen from Obersteinbach

== History ==
The castle was a fief of the Abbey of Wissembourg, held by the Wasigenstein family. Its first mention in records dates from 1316. The castle is semi-troglodytic. The corps de logis follows the rocky contours and is protected by a strong surrounding wall.

== Structure ==
A small doorway cut into the rock is dated 1494. On the eastern side of the castle, long cavities in the ground were the foundations for wooden buildings which enlarged the habitable area.

== Access ==
The castle may be reached from the village of Obersteinbach. From the sports ground, a path marked by red-white-red rectangular markers leads to the site.
