= Château de Wangenbourg =

Ruined castle in Wangenbourg-Engenthal in the Bas-Rhin département of France

Coordinates: 48°37′15″N 7°18′51″E

The Château de Wangenbourg is a ruined castle in the commune of Wangenbourg-Engenthal in the Bas-Rhin département of France.

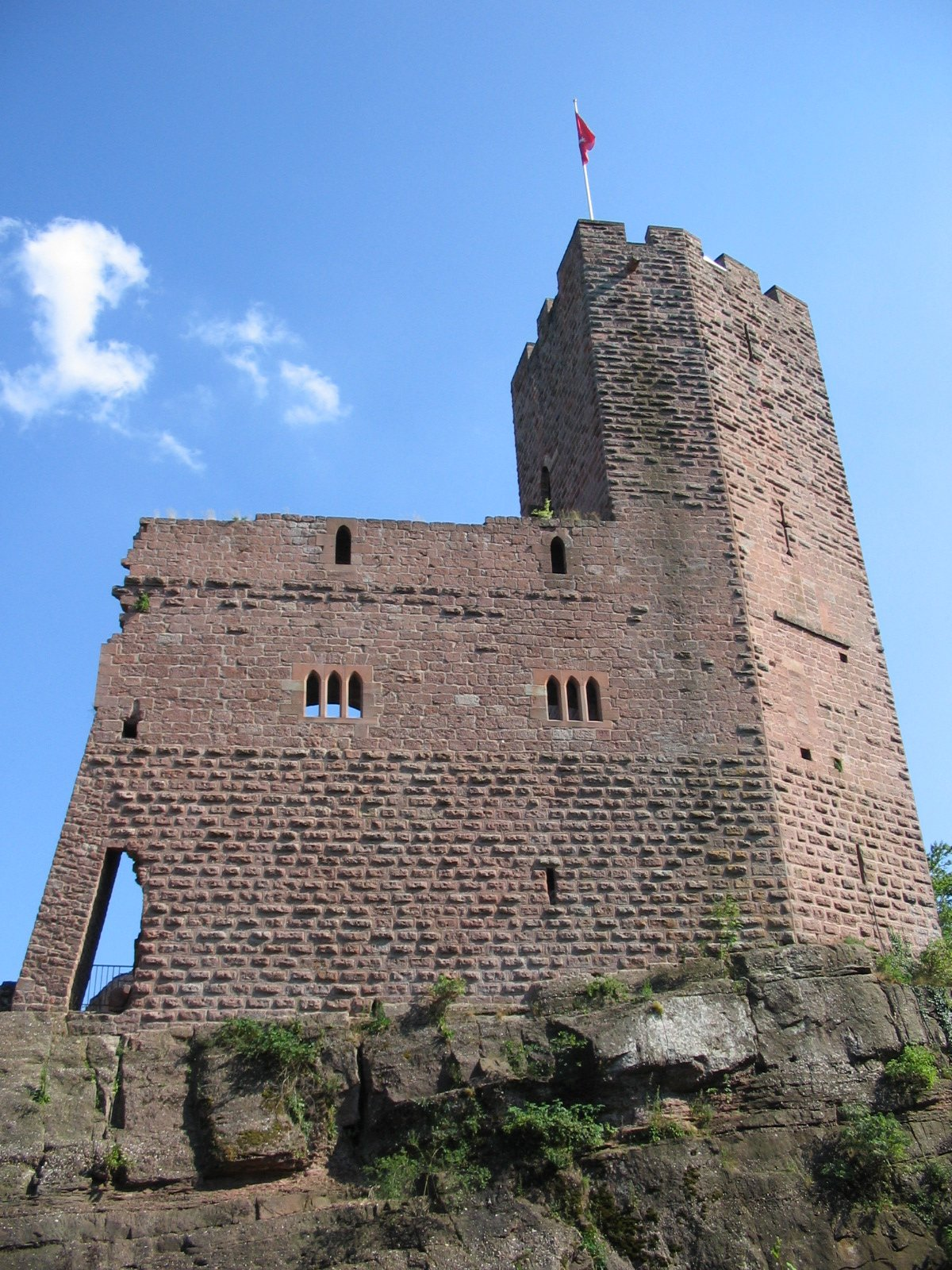
Château de Wangebourg

In 1504, Holy Roman Emperor Maximilien I, having vanquished the Prince-elector, Philipp, in the war of succession of Bavaria, confiscated the castle from the Lords of Wangen, cousins Hans and Stephan von Wangen, for the favor to count Tiestein, who himself gave it to the Archbishop of Strasbourg, Wilhelm III von Hohnstein, in 1516. Nevertheless, a branch of descendants of the von Wangens, Georg and Hartmann, continued to occupy the castle. Between 1535 and 1550, they reconstructed their logis in the Renaissance style (see photograph below).

From 1578, the Archbishop of Strasbourg and the lords of Wangen disputed property rights concerning the castle. The Wangens were expelled in 1578, but re-established their rights in 1595. In 1680, the castle was occupied by French troops. In 1702, it was in ruins.

Restoration of the castle started at the beginning of the 20th century, and again in 1931. The footbridge in the photograph was constructed in 1961 to replace the old drawbridge.

== Plan ==
N°	Description
1	Principal moat
2	17th century access ramp
3	Entrance and access ramp to the lower court
4	Lower court
5	Footbridge and main entrance
6	Moat
7	Hartmann de Wangen's residence
8	Georg de Wangen's residence
9	Spiral staircase tower
10	Steam room
11	Kitchen oven
12	Chapel tower
13	Large Gothic residence
14	Filtration cistern
15	Tower-habitation
16	Keep
17	Tomb

== Remains ==
The vast polygonal enceinte is still visible, as well as the bases of the walls on the interior buildings. The castle ruins have been listed since 6 December 1898 as a monument historique by the French Ministry of Culture and is privately owned.

== Gallery ==
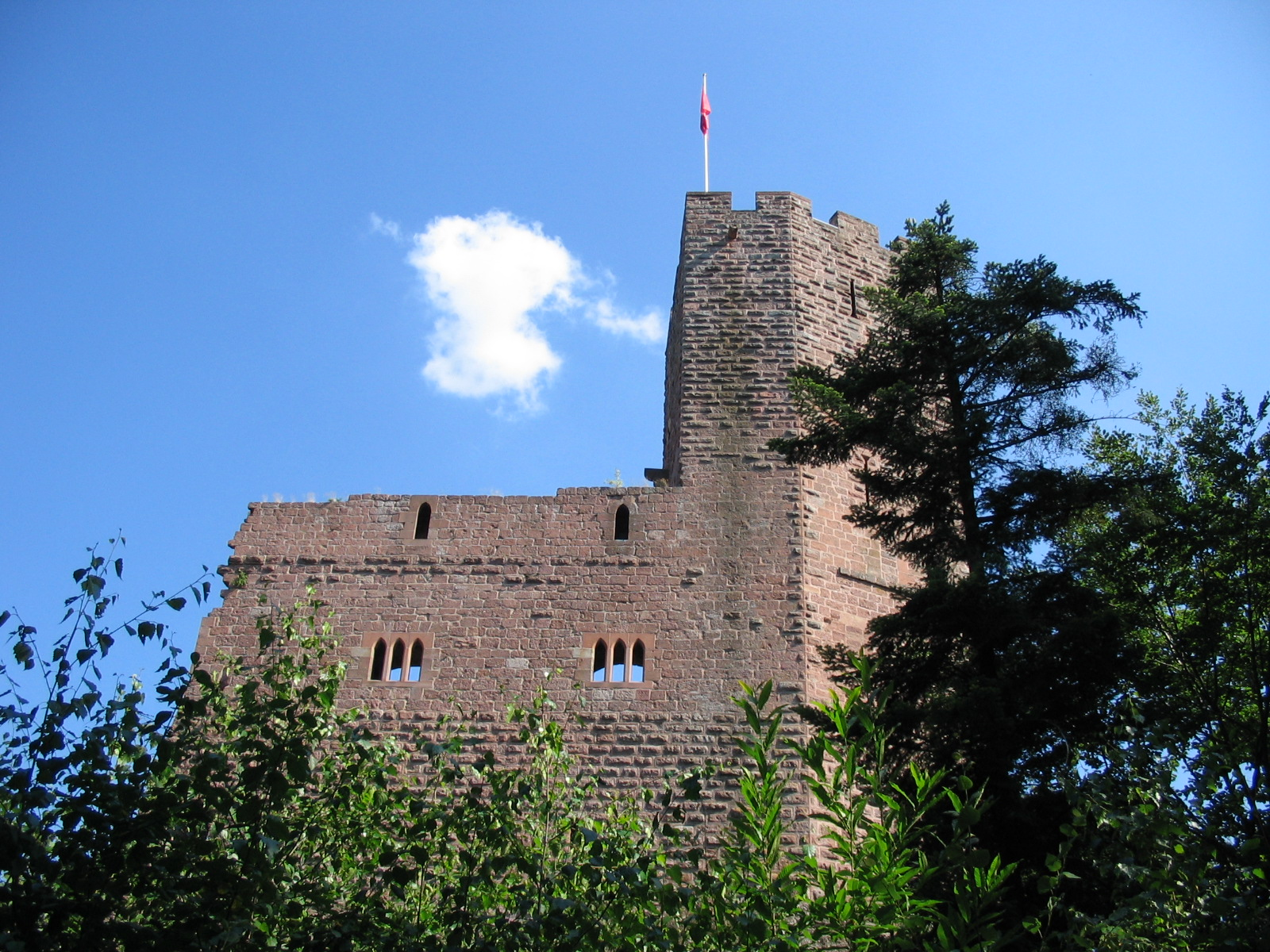
General view

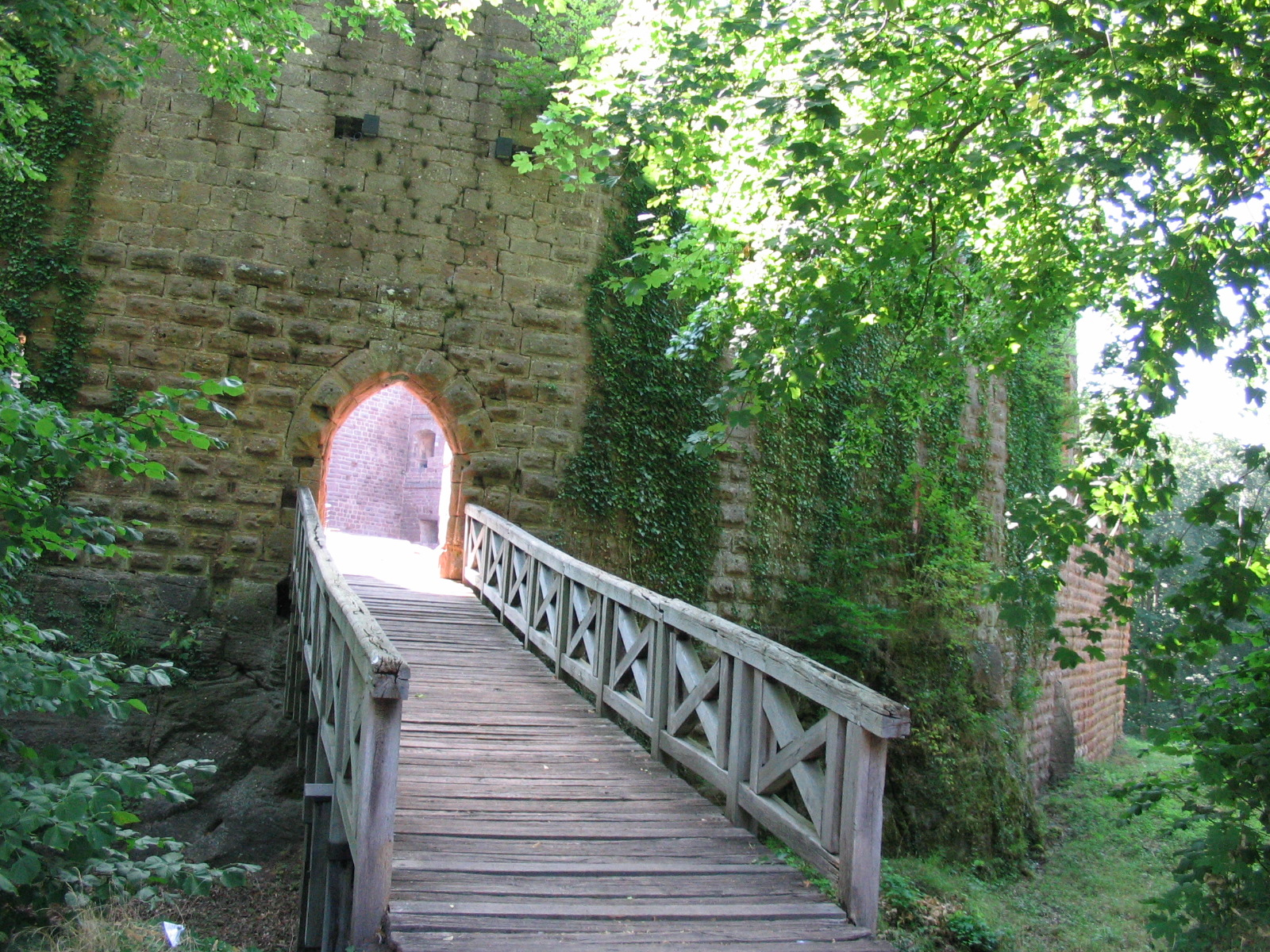
Main entrance

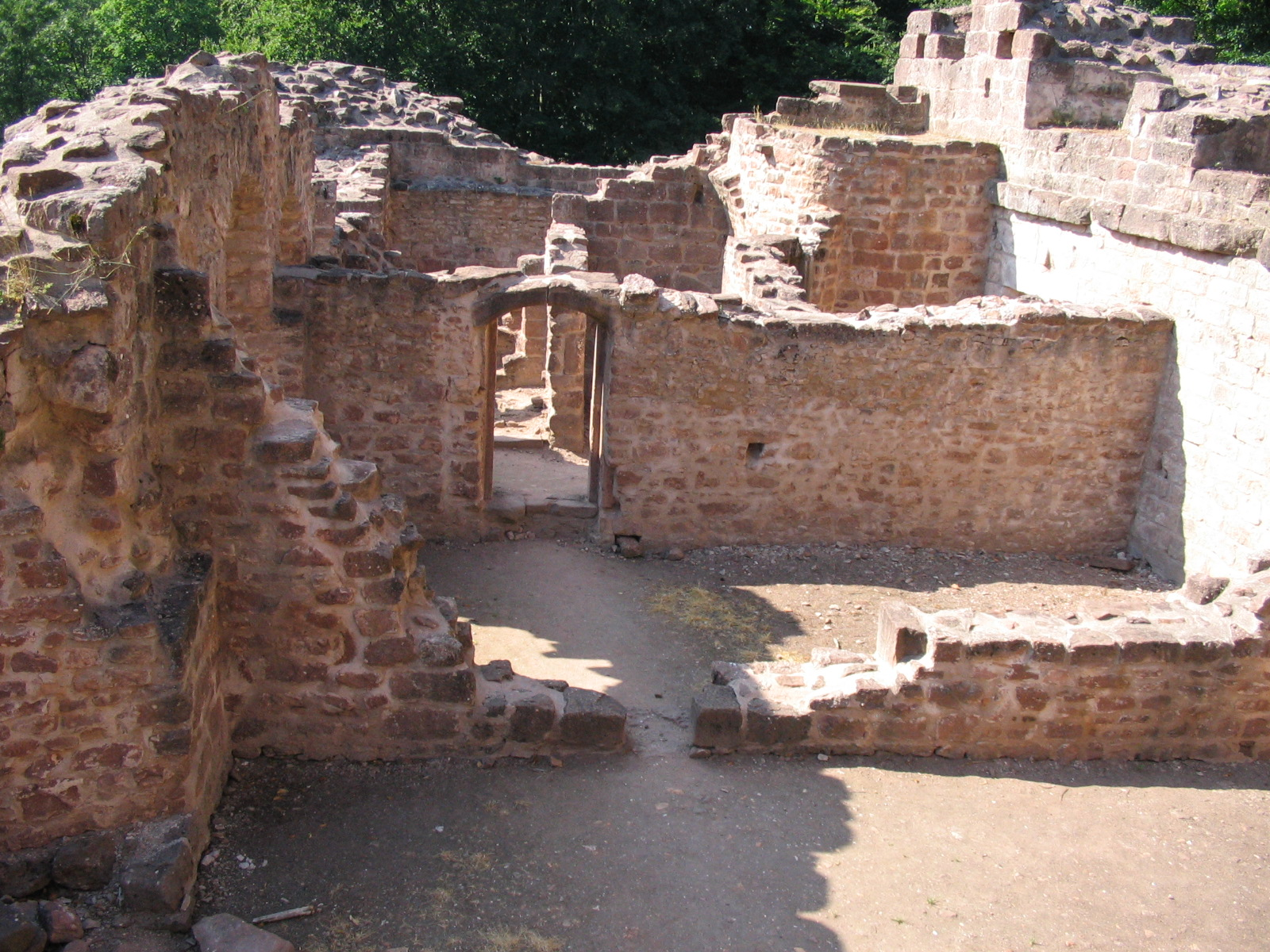
Georg de Wangen's residence

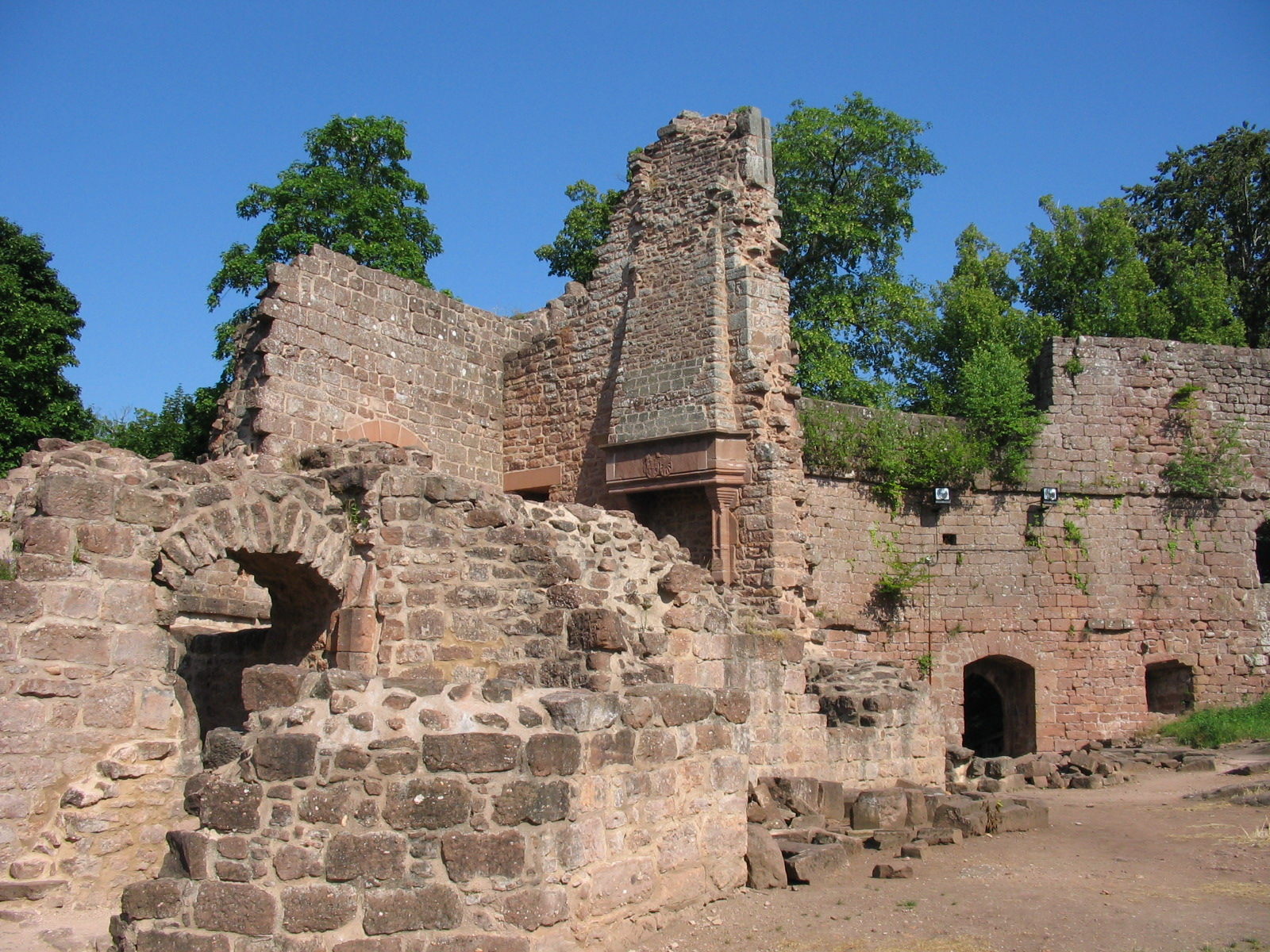
Georg de Wangen's residence

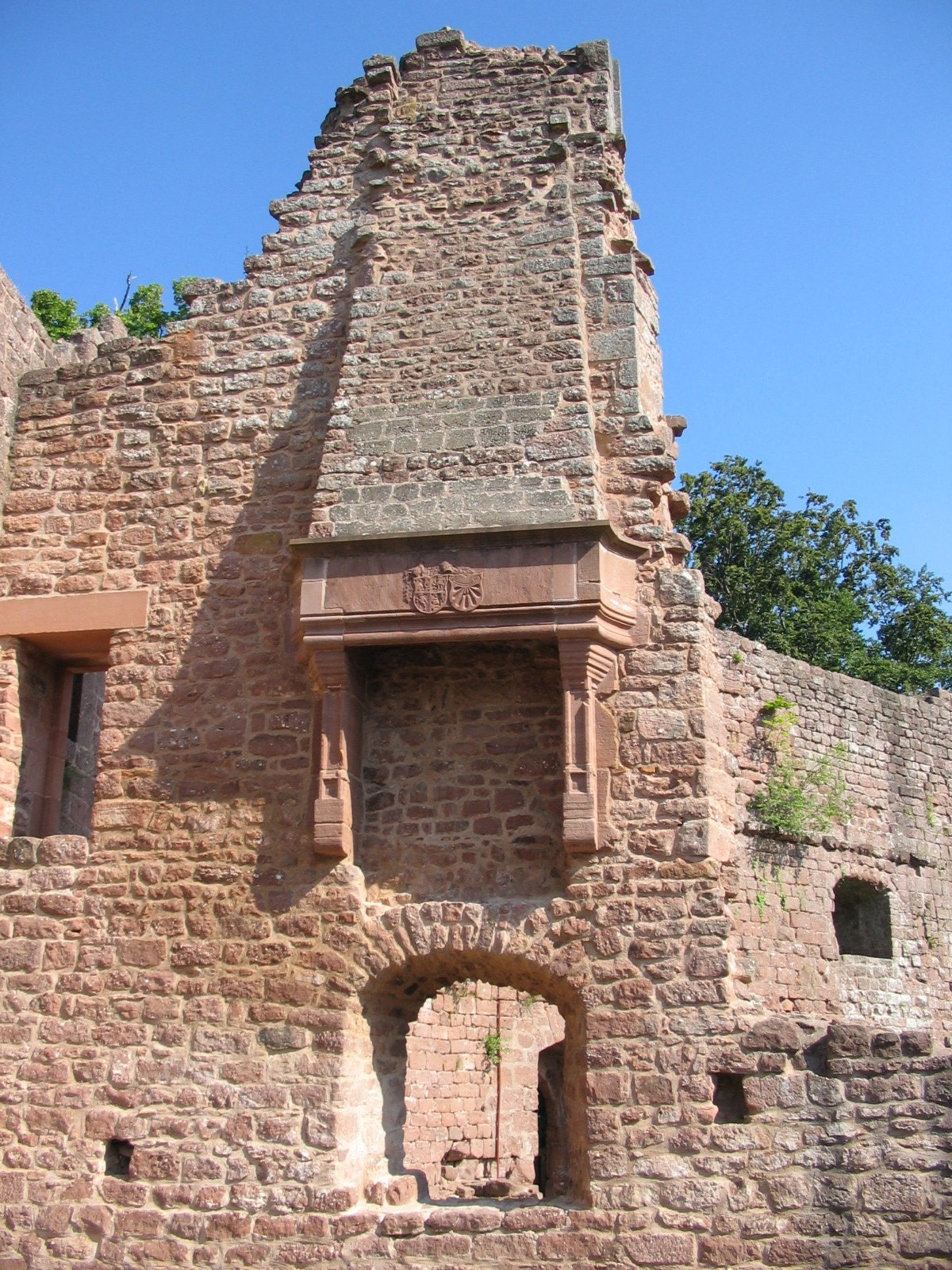
Renaissance chimney

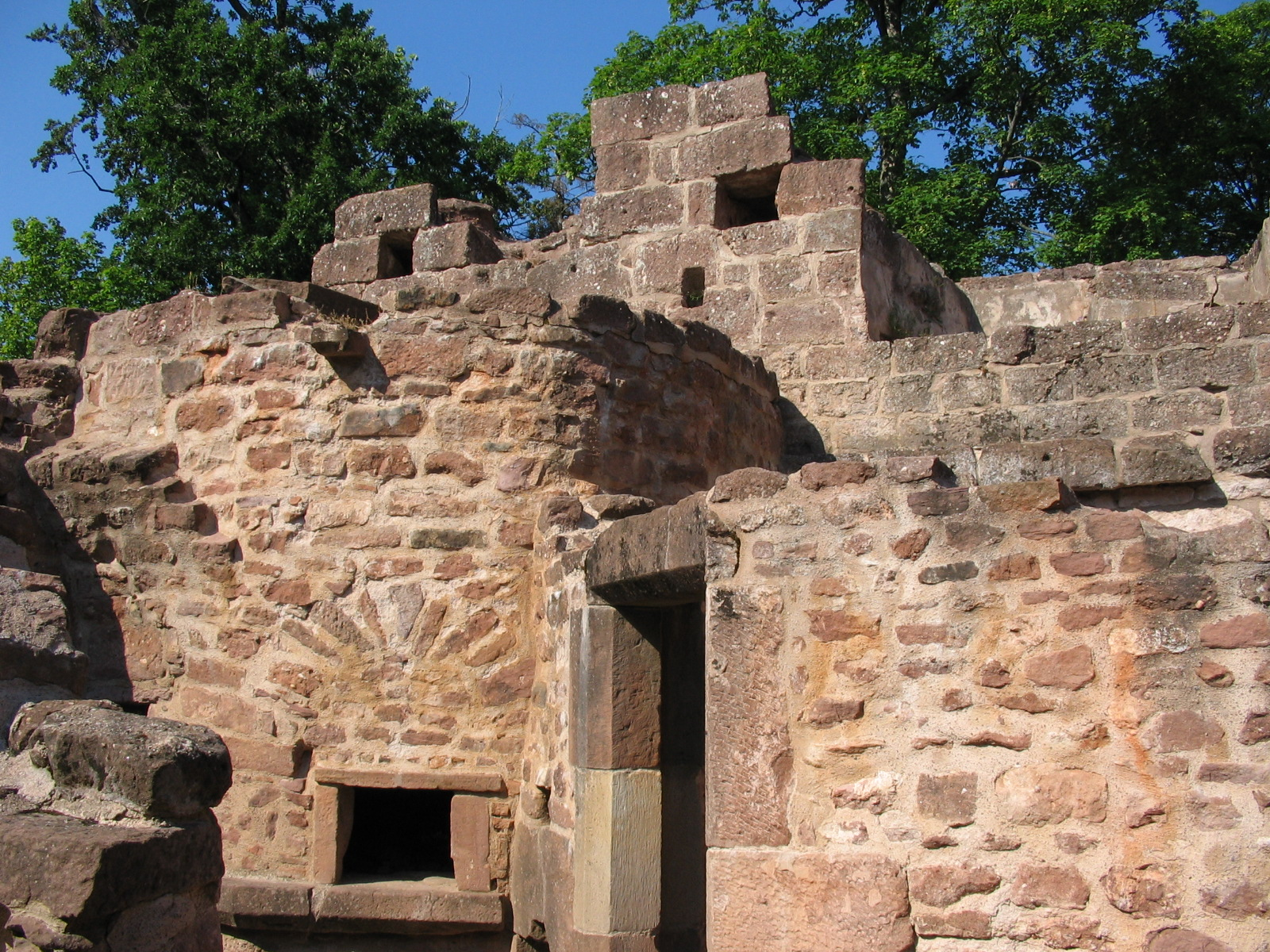
Kitchen oven

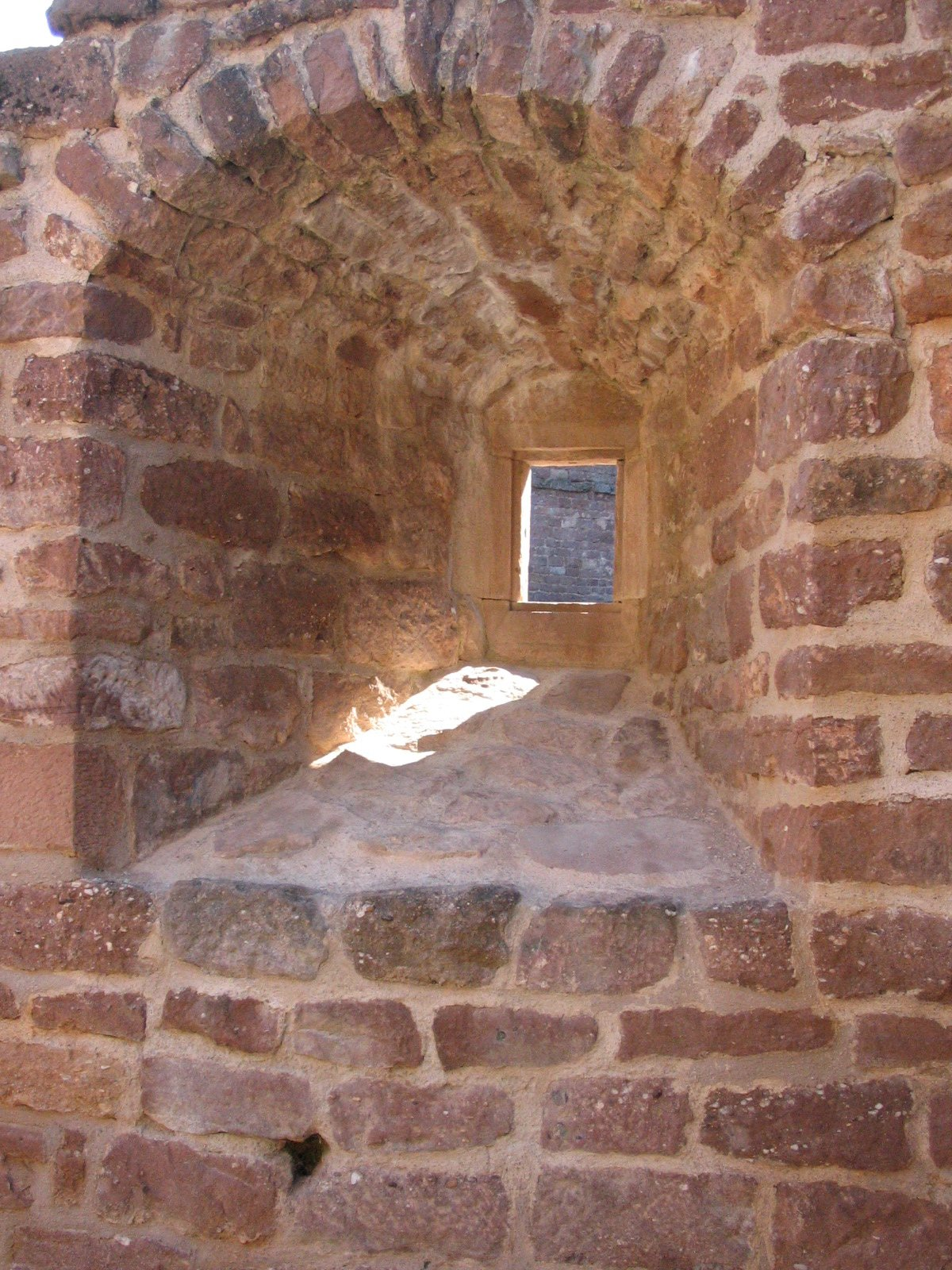
Window

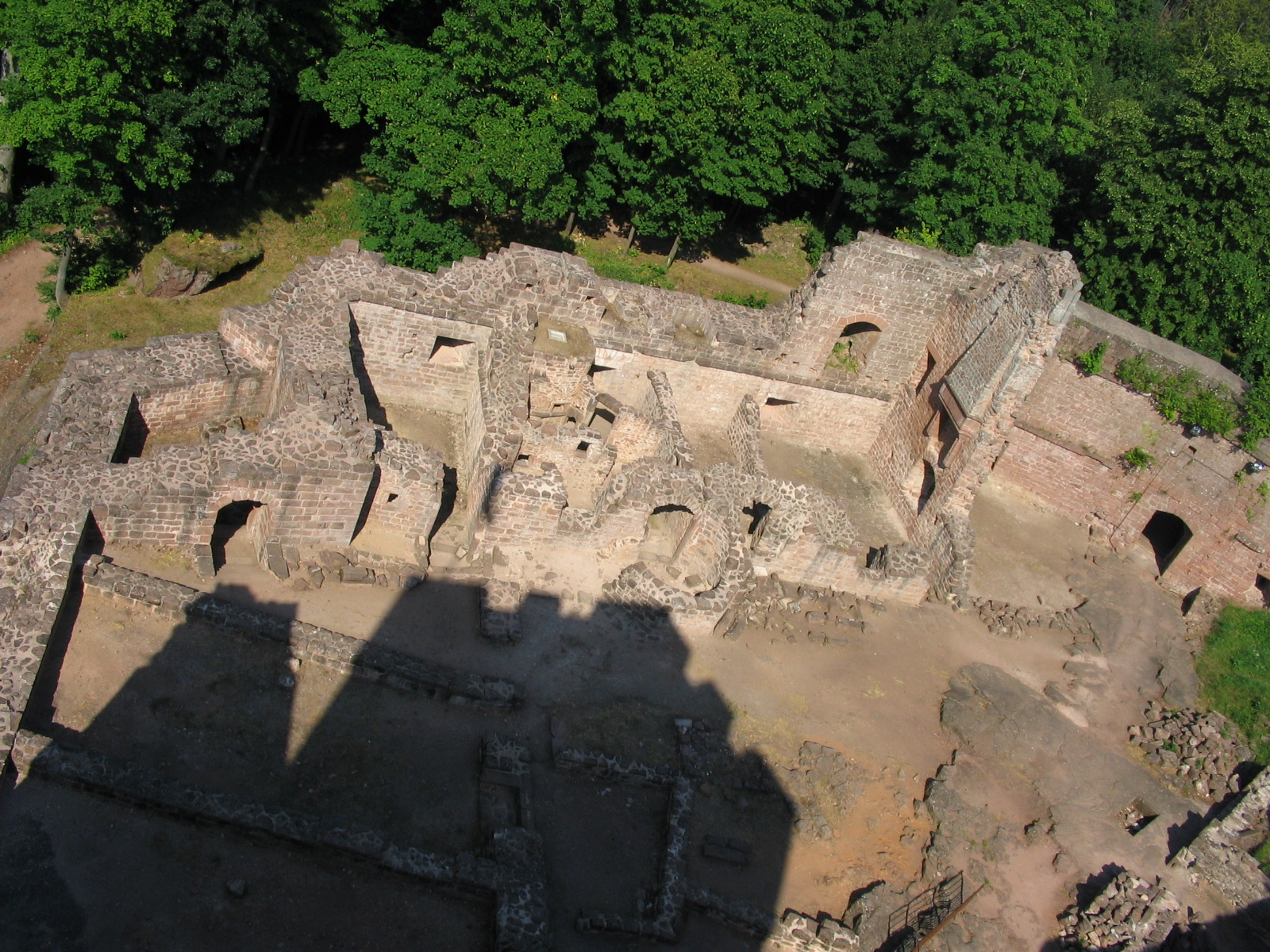
View from keep

== See also ==
- List of castles in France
