= Château du Freudeneck =

Ruined medieval castle in Alsace, France

Coordinates: 48°37′31″N 7°19′40″E

The Château du Freudeneck is a ruined medieval castle situated in the commune of Wangenbourg-Engenthal in the Bas-Rhin département in Alsace, France.

== History ==
The castle was built towards the end of the 13th century, with other construction periods in the 14th and 15th centuries. Its construction is attributed to members of the Dicka family. Damaged by fire in 1408 and rebuilt, it was finally ruined at the end of the 15th century after several attacks.

== Description ==
Built on a rocky outcrop, this small castle is not very homogeneous in its construction. It was built with sandstone infilled with hardcore. Surrounded by a ditch, it is composed of an enceinte and a keep on the curtain wall. The latter, of circular plan, stands on a square buttressed base. The external dressed stones present a rustic embossing without edging, while the stones inside the enclosure are smooth.

A programme of restoration work by volunteers was begun in 2004 with the intention of opening the castle to the public in 2018.

== See also ==
- List of castles in France
