= Château du Petit-Ringelstein =

Ruined castle in Bas-Rhin, France

Coordinates: 48°34′24″N 7°18′50″E

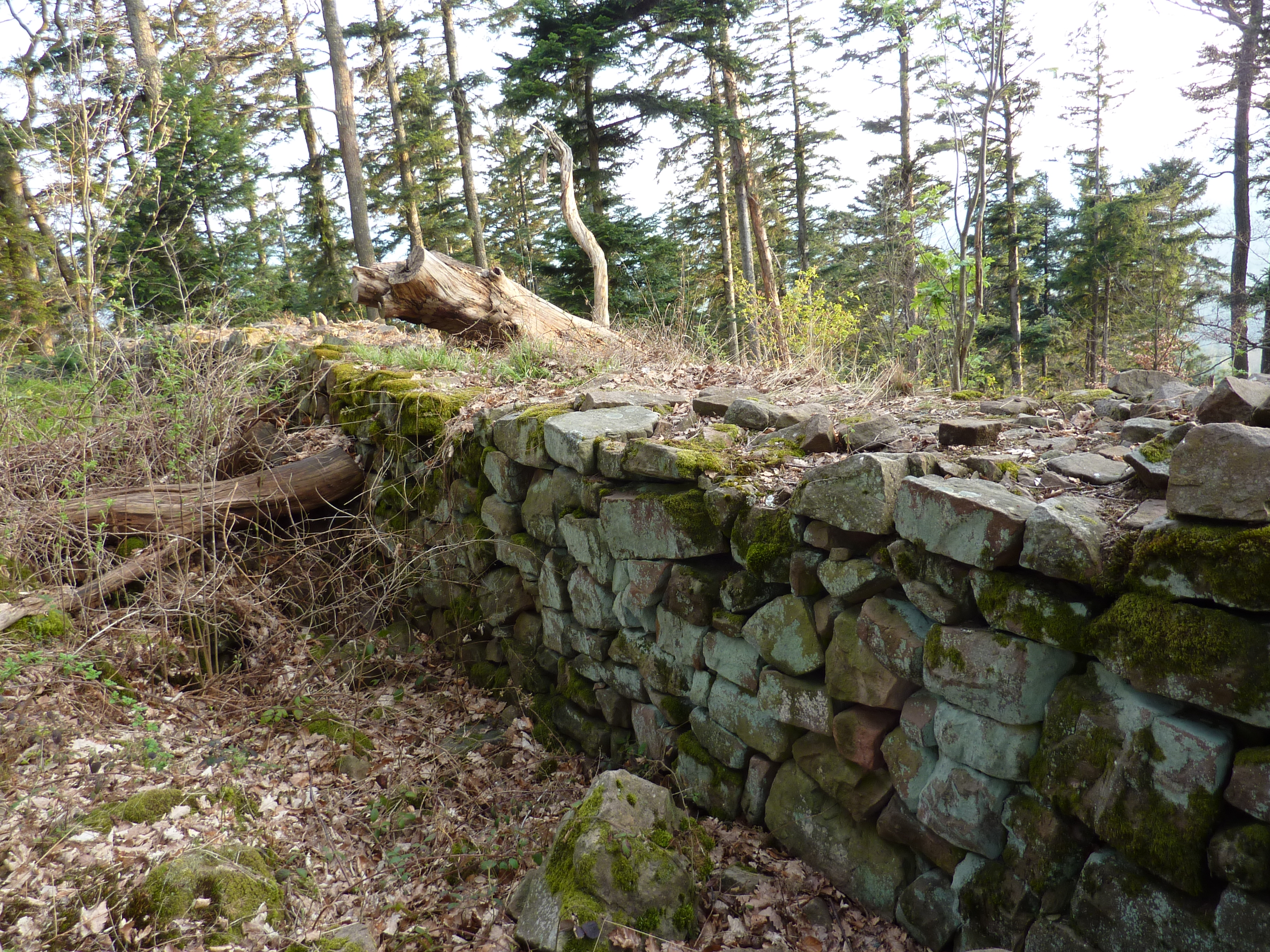
West wall; dry stone walling of the enceinte

The Château du Petit-Ringelstein (or Château du Petit-Ringelsberg) is a ruined castle in the commune of Oberhaslach in the Bas-Rhin département of France. It is sited on a small summit that it surrounds with its enceinte constructed of dry stone walls.

== Access ==
The ruins can be accessed via the paths provided by the Club Vosgien. They are on an extension of the path leading from Oberhaslach to the Château du Grand Ringelstein.

== Toponymy ==
The name Petit-Ringelstein is derived from the German words Ring (ring or circle) and Stein (stone).

== Ruins ==
A dry stone wall circles the hill top, measuring approximately 61m by 21m, with a height of one metre. It is bordered by a ditch.

There is a quarry nearby from which rocks were cut and dressed. They date, probably, from the first third of the 13th century and would have been used for the Château du Grand-Ringelstein and/or the Château de Hohenstein.

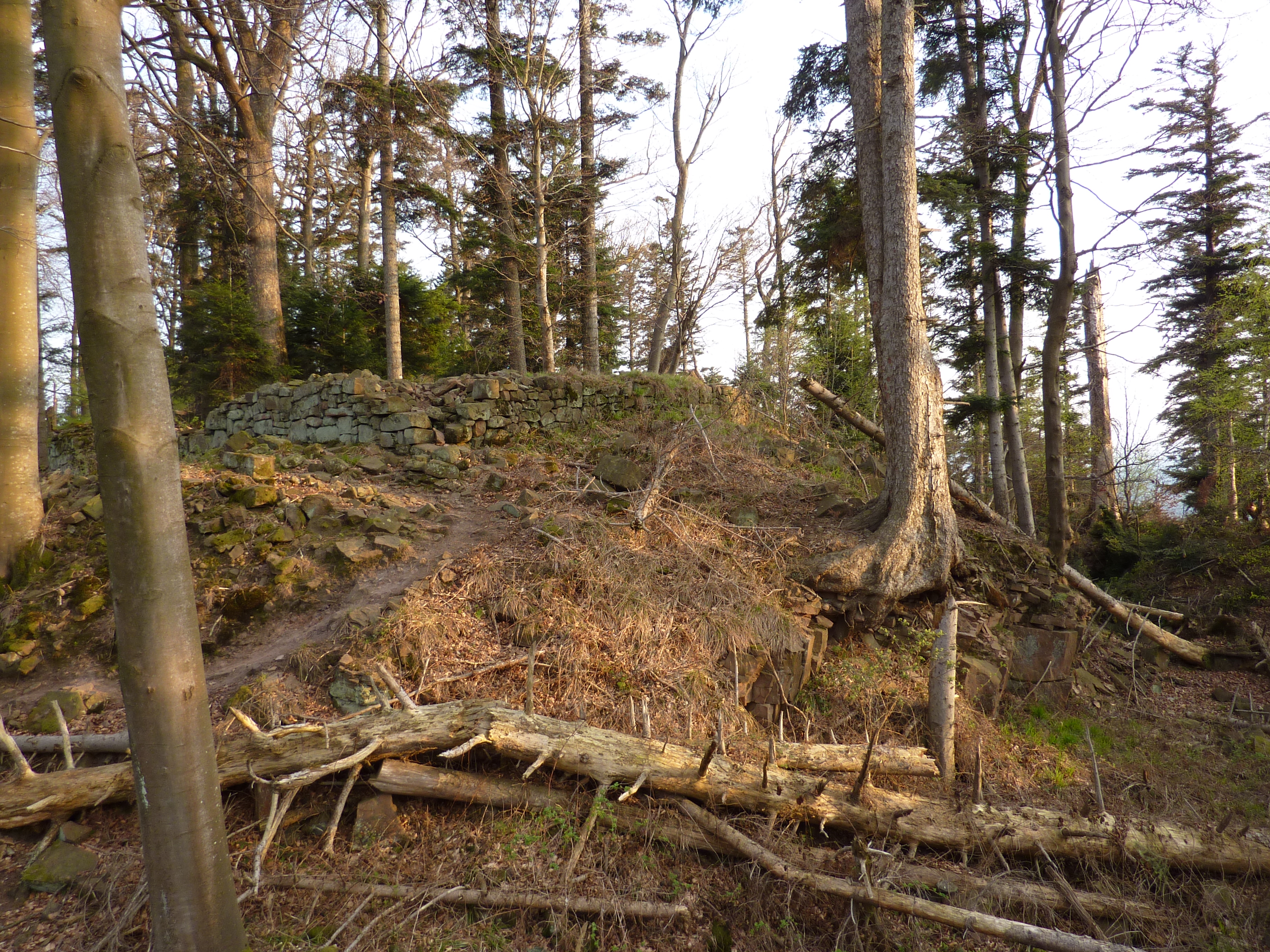
North wall and ditch

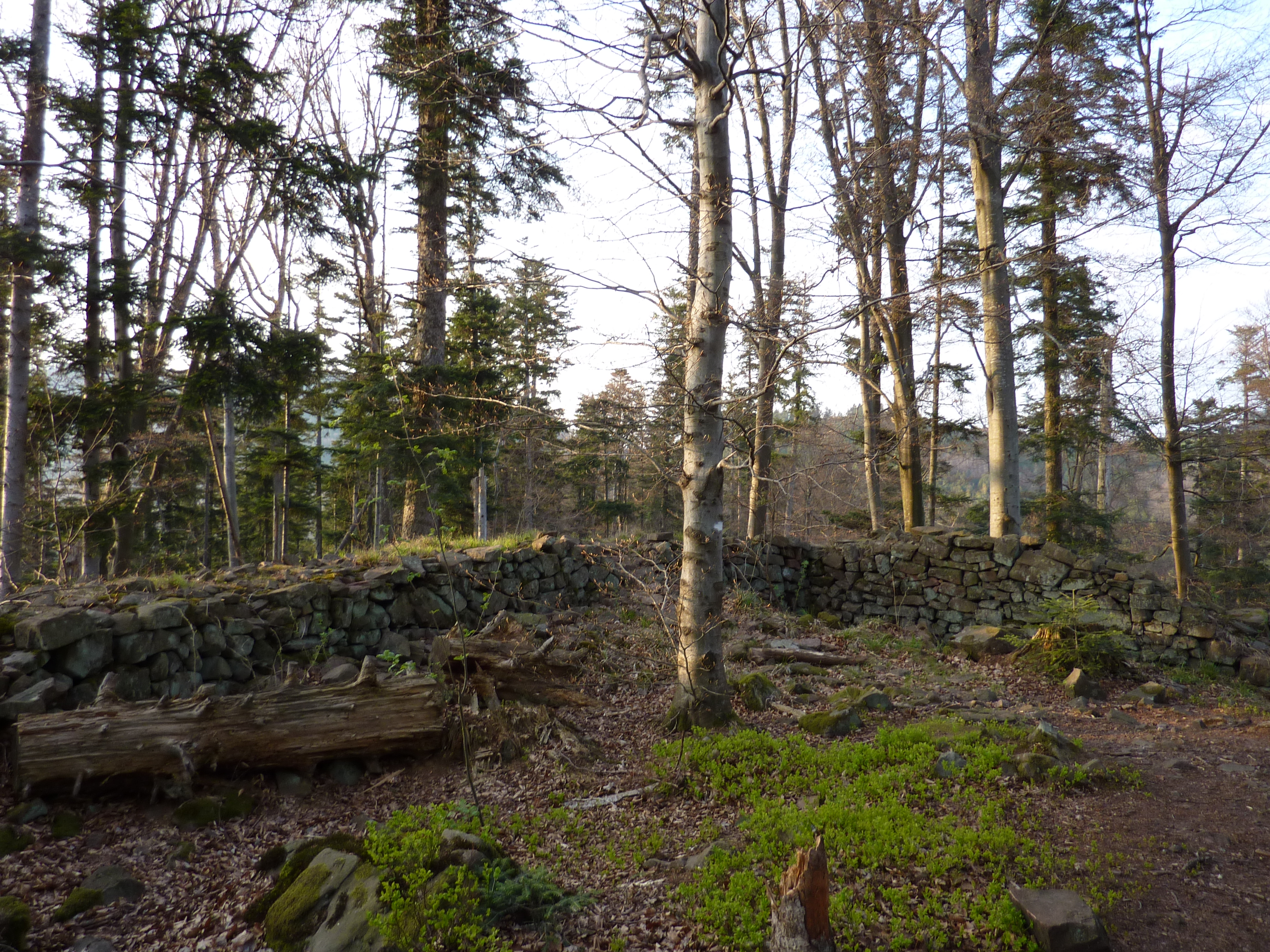
North wall from the interior

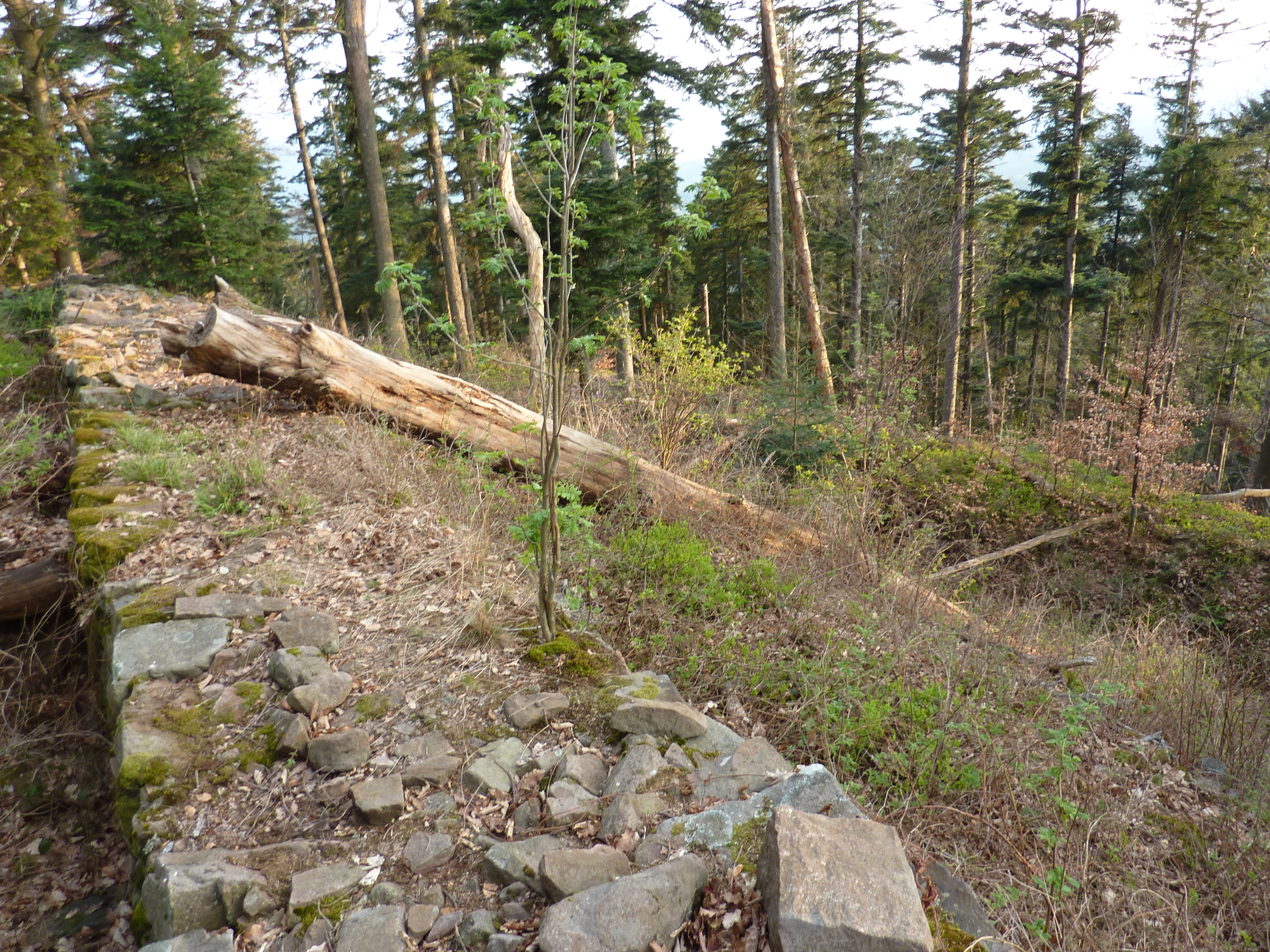
West wall; dry stone walling from above

== History ==
Nothing is known of the history of the Petit-Ringelstein. It may have been a primitive form of castle. Its present aspect is probably from a later alteration, perhaps during a siege of the Château de Hohenstein.

It has been listed since 1898 as a monument historique by the French Ministry of Culture, and is state property.

== See also ==
- Château du Grand Ringelstein, a neighbouring castle
- List of castles in France

== Bibliography ==
- Charles-Laurent Salch, Nouveau Dictionnaire des Châteaux-Forts d'Alsace, Alsatia 1991.
- Charles-Laurent Salch, "Archéologie du château alsacien", in Châteaux Guerriers, 1975
- Bernard Haegel, "L'enceinte et la carrière de pierres médiévale du Petit-Ringelstein" in Etudes Médiévales, III, 1985
