= Château de Meywihr =

Ruined 10th century castle in Ammerschwihr in the Haut-Rhin département of France

Coordinates: 48.1224°N 7.2811°E

The Château de Meywihr is a ruined 10th century castle in the commune of Ammerschwihr in the Haut-Rhin département of France. The castle is also known as Minnewiller or Meiwihr.

== History ==
Having belonged initially to the abbey of Murbach, it was seized by the Counts of Ferrette. In about 1279, it was besieged by the lords de Ribeaupierre, who were awarded it in 1291 in a judgement by Rodolphe de Habsburg.

After several changes of ownership, the ruined castle was used a quarry in 1782, to provide stone for the building of a presbytery in the town. Of limited strategic value, especially following the fortification of Ammerschwihr, the castle was already in ruins by 1353.

== Ruins ==
The remains of the castle had been thought to be the ruins of a Frankish fort. They appeared as a circular mound 66 metres in diameter surrounded by a ditch. At the centre of a hillock formed by remains of the castle, excavations in 1959 revealed the base of a square keep with 8 metre sides, with no more than 2 m height remaining, dating from the 12th century. The exposed walls were more than 2 metres thick, composed of regular blocks of sandstone, limestone and granite, and represented the two lower levels of the foundations. The nature of the stones and their construction dates the origin of the castle to the end of the Romanesque era.

The castle is privately owned. It has been listed since 1965 as a monument historique by the French Ministry of Culture.

== See also ==
- List of castles in France
