= Château du Grand Ringelstein =

Ruined castle in Bas-Rhin, Grand Est, France

Coordinates: 48°33′47″N 7°19′16″E

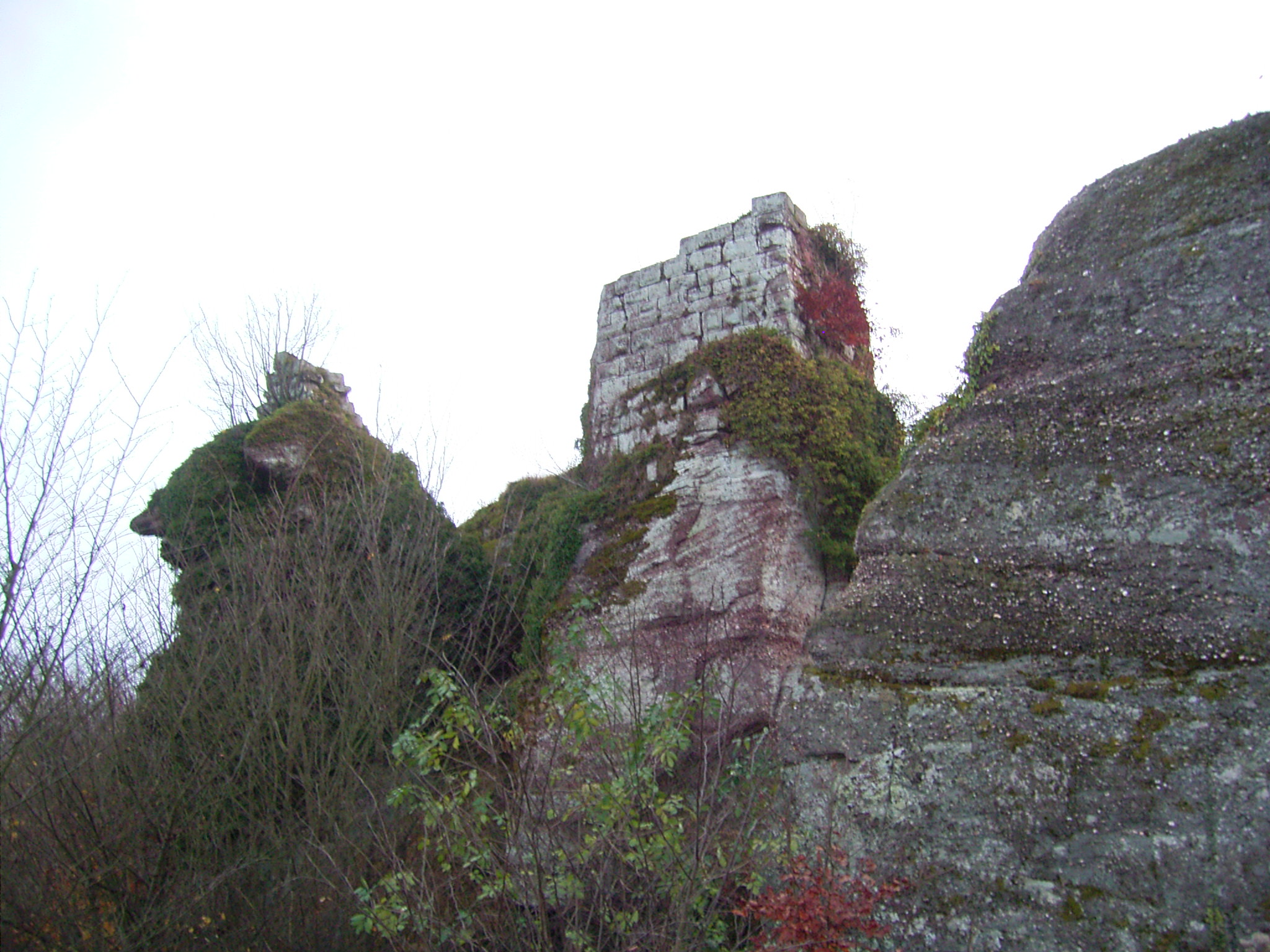
Ruins of the pentagonal keep of the Château du Grand Ringelstein

The Château du Grand Ringelstein (or Château Ringelsbourg) is a ruined castle in the commune of Oberhaslach in the Bas-Rhin département of France.

Dating from the beginning of the 13th century, it is built around several sandstone rocks at an altitude of 644 m. At the summit of the rocks there are only meagre remains of buildings, including the remnants of a pentagonal keep in the north, the most accessible part of the site. By contrast, the polygonal enceinte that surrounds the group of rocks is still well-preserved, particularly on the south west side, where one can see several small fully arched openings.

Owned by the Eguisheims, the site was recorded in the middle of the 12th century. After the extinction of the family, it passed to the Bishop of Strasbourg. A haunt of brigand knights, it was destroyed in 1470.

It has been listed since 1898 as a monument historique by the French Ministry of Culture and is state-owned.

== See also ==
- List of castles in France
- Château du Petit-Ringelstein, a neighbouring castle
