= Château de Schœneck =

Ruined castle in Dambach, Bas-Rhin, France

Coordinates: 49°01′08″N 7°39′31″E

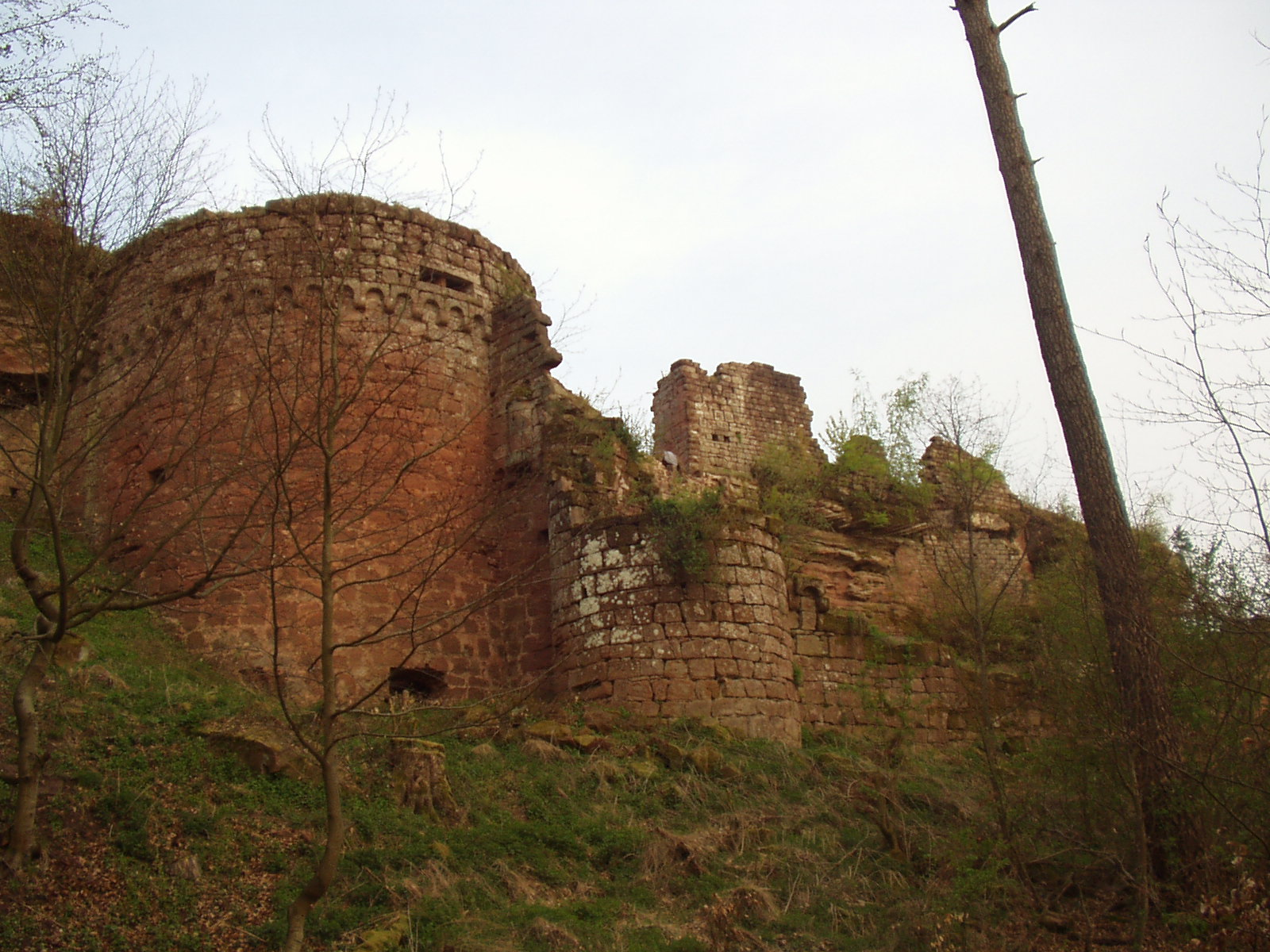
Ruins of the Château de Schœneck

The Château de Schœneck is a ruined castle situated in the commune of Dambach, in the French département of Bas-Rhin.

== History ==
The castle, probably built at the end of the 13th century, is on a rocky crest at an altitude of 380 m. It was certainly built at the instigation of the Hohenstaufens for hunting brigands taking refuge in the area. Destroyed around 1280, it was rebuilt in 1286 and is mentioned in 1287 as the property of the Bishop of Strasbourg, ally of the Habsburgs. He entrusted the upkeep to the Lichtenbergs and pledged its allegiance to Schœneck.

The castle was restored between 1335 and 1390 to adapt it to the progress of artillery. It was modernised between 1545 and 1547 by the Exkbrechts of Durckheim, who had held the fiefdom since 1517. The castle was finally destroyed in 1680 by French troops, on the order of Louis XIV and, after the French Revolution, the ruins were bought by the Dietrich family.

The castle has been listed as a monument historique by the French Ministry of Culture since 1984.

== Description ==
A small vaulted door and a larger entrance flanked by two 16th-century bastions with cannon holes are still visible. The remains of the manor buildings appear as a Lombard frieze, notably because of the bay windows on the upper level outside the western curtain wall, with their narrow semi-circular arches. To the west, a rectilinear curtain wall closes the lower courtyard while, in the east, a long wall is flanked by two towers.

The castle has been the subject of consolidation works by the association Cunulmergrun since 2000.

== See also ==
List of castles in France

== Bibliography ==
- Maurice Frey Chronique des fouilles médiévales. Dambach-Neunhoffen, Château de Schoeneck 1983
- Ecole d'architecture, Strasbourg Le château de Schoeneck, Chantiers 1981/1984 1984
- BILGER, Bertrand-L Schoeneck ou les ambitions des Durckheim 1991
