= Château de Wildenstein =

French castle ruin

Coordinates: 47°56′57″N 6°57′33″E

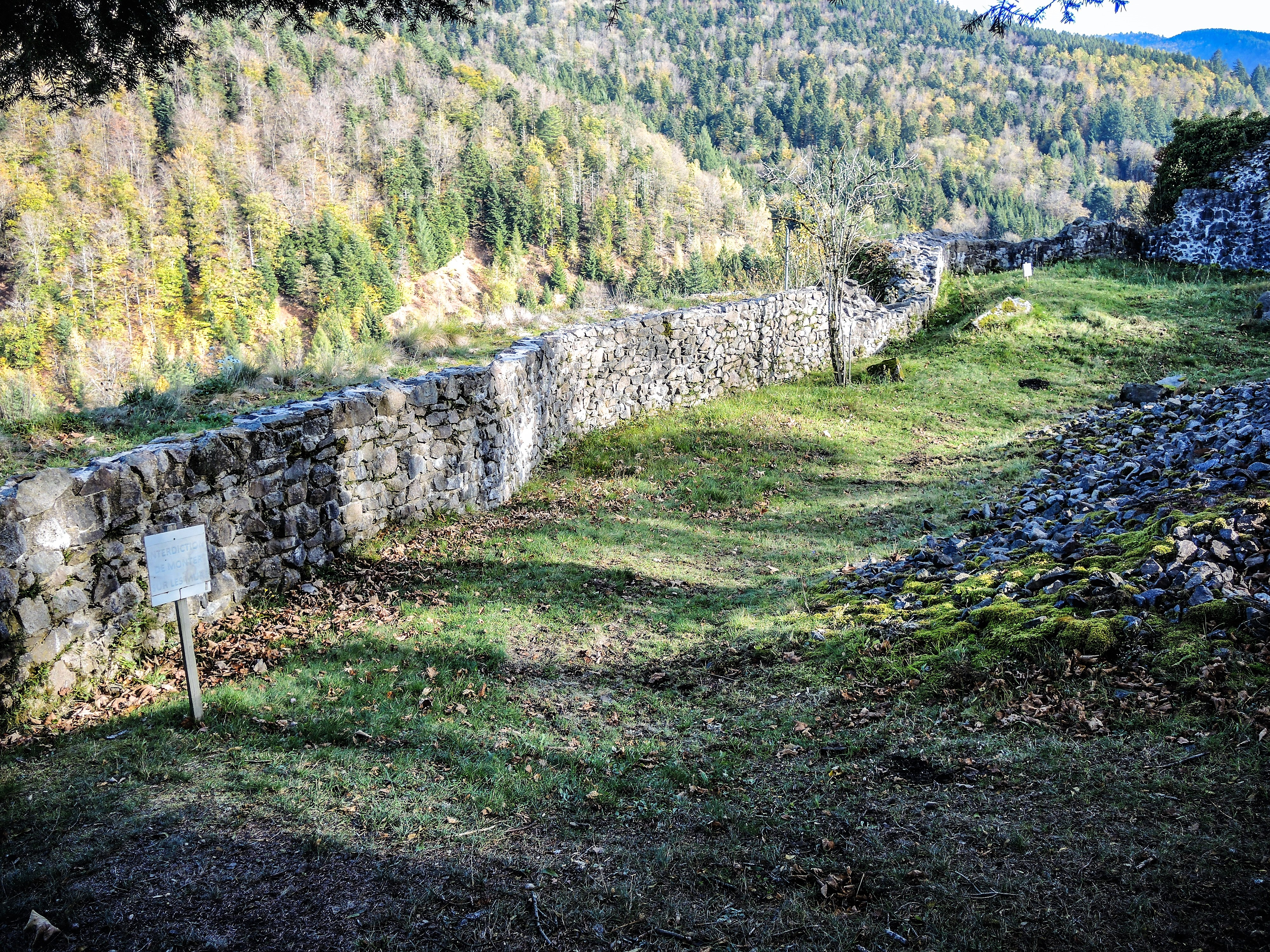
Château de Wildenstein

The Château de Wildenstein (French pronunciation: [ʃato də vildənʃtain]) is a ruined castle in the Alsace region of France, situated in the commune of Kruth in the Haut-Rhin département.

== History ==
The castle's position on top of a glacial moraine dominating the road from the Oderen Pass towards Lorraine made it an excellent instrument for surveillance. The Château de Wildenstein is first mentioned in 1312 as the property of the count of Ferrette, Ulrich III. He promised his rival, the abbot of Murbach, that he would not build castles on the abbey's territory, on condition that Pierre de Bollwiller was given a free hand at Wildenstein. It was given as a fief to Pierre and stayed in his family's hands until 1536. At this date, it was practically in ruins and the abbot of Murbach bought it back and began to rebuild and restore the castle, to better suit it to warfare with firearms. A chapel was also built at this time, dedicated to the Holy Cross (Sainte Croix). During the Thirty Years' War, it was taken and retaken by the Swedes and the French. It was destroyed by the Swedes in 1644 and from the end of the 17th century it was used as a source of building materials for the neighbouring villages, including the church at Oderen.

== Description ==
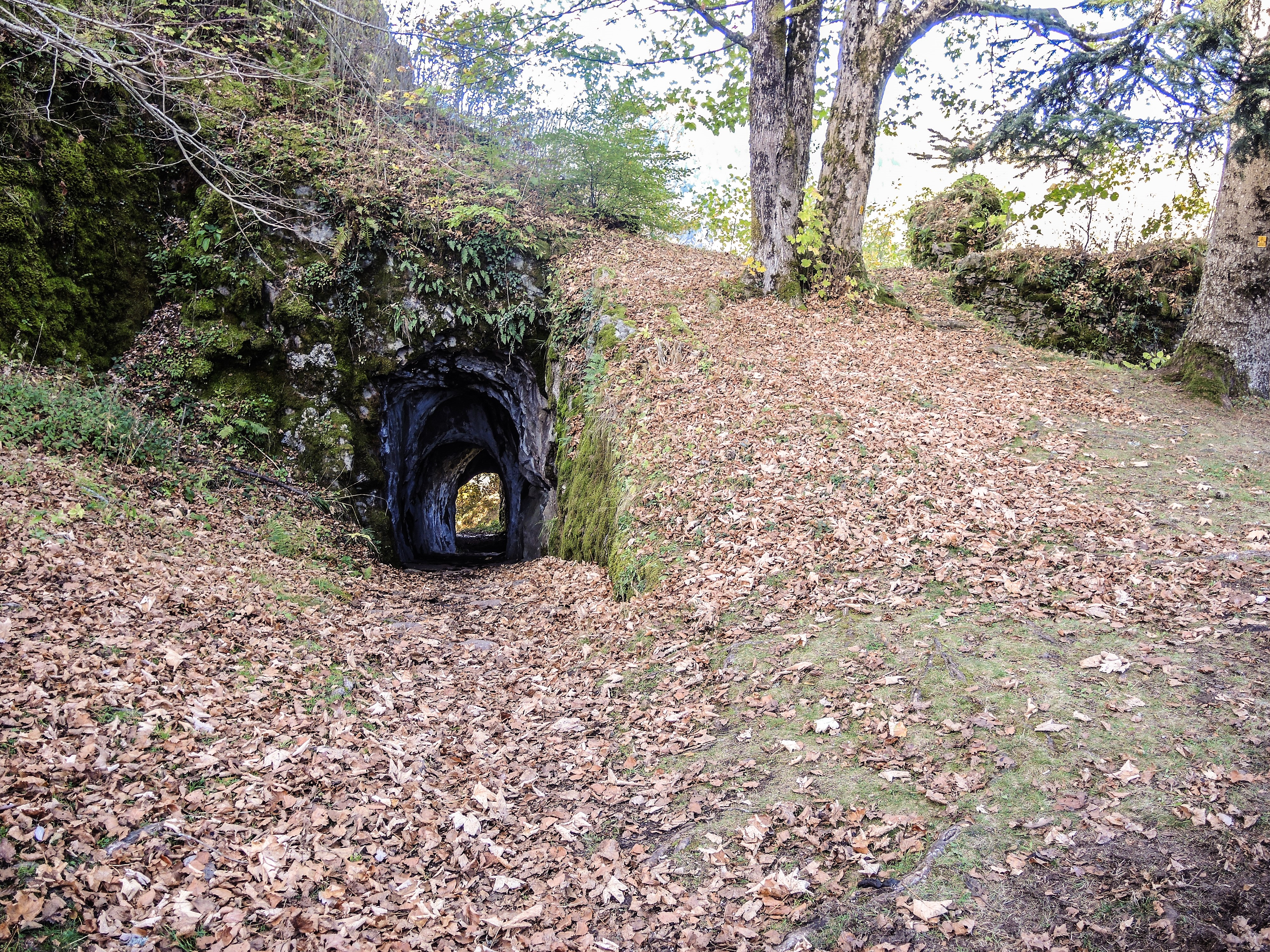
The tunnel

The castle occupies the entire summit of a rocky outcrop (called Schlossberg), 666 m altitude. The rock has been pierced by a tunnel to give access to the lower courtyard, artificially enlarged in the 16th century. Little of the castle is visible today, apart from traces of round towers, portions of wall of low height and staircases cut into the rock to reach the upper terrace. Archaeological digs and preservation work were carried out in 1995. A plan published by abbé Sifferlen, in his work on the Saint-Amarin valley, shows the layout of the buildings, but on site it is very difficult to find them. The only well-preserved wall is a retaining wall to the east of the lower courtyard.

Though one of the largest castles in Alsace it is also one of the least known to visitors.

The Château de Wildenstein is not listed as a monument historique by the French Ministry of Culture due to its poor state.

== See also ==
- List of castles in France
