= Château de l'Ortenbourg =

Ruined castle in Scherwiller, France

Coordinates: 48.2957°N 7.3921°E

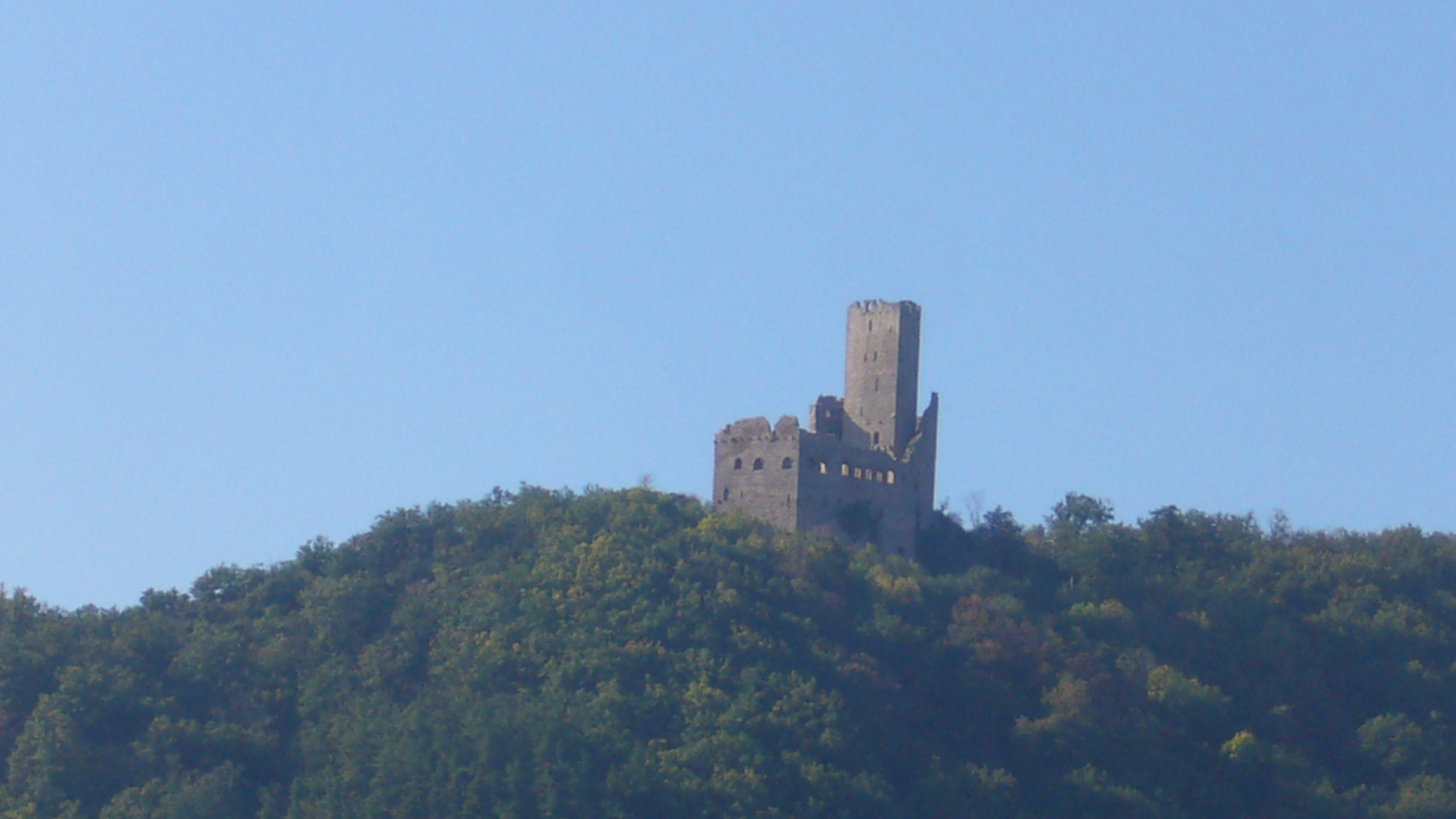

Château de l'Ortenbourg or Ortenberg is a ruined castle situated in the commune of Scherwiller in the département of Bas-Rhin of France. It is dated to the 13th century. It is a listed historical monument since 1924.
