= Obersteinbach =

- Commune
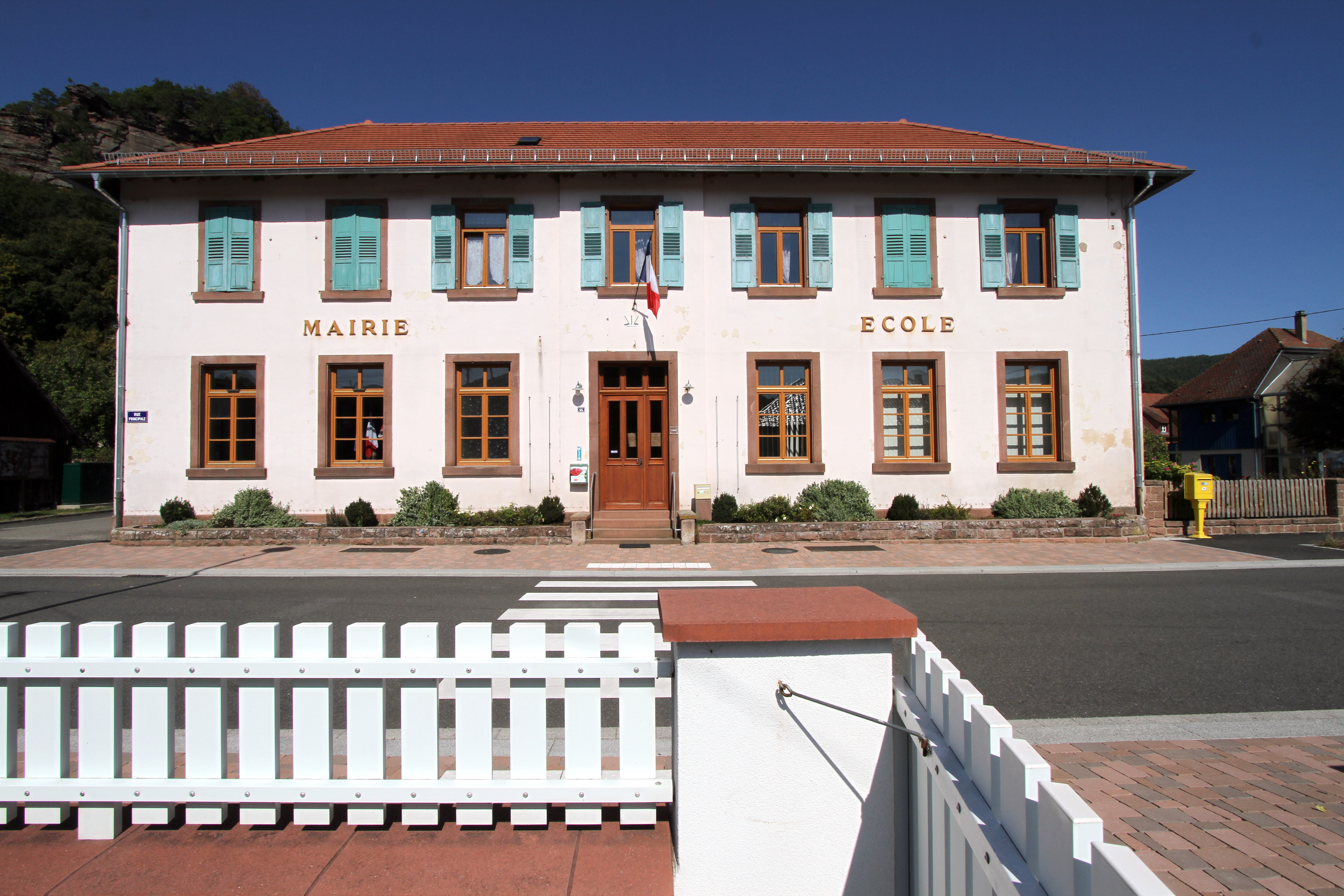
- Town hall and school

- Coat of arms
- Location of Obersteinbach
- Location within France Location within Grand Est
- Coordinates: 49°02′12″N 7°41′18″E
- Country: France
- Region: Grand Est
- Department: Bas-Rhin
- Arrondissement: Haguenau-Wissembourg
- Canton: Reichshoffen

Government
  - Mayor (2022–2026): Céline Sturm
- Area^{1}: 9.18 km^{2} (3.54 sq mi)
- Highest elevation: 430 m (1,410 ft)
- Lowest elevation: 234 m (768 ft)
- Population (2023): 234
  - Density: 25.5/km^{2} (66.0/sq mi)
- Time zone: UTC+01:00 (CET)
  - Summer (DST): UTC+02:00 (CEST)
- INSEE/Postal code: 67353 /67510
- ^{1} French Land Register data, which excludes lakes, ponds, glaciers > 1 km^{2} (0.386 sq mi or 247 acres) and river estuaries.

Obersteinbach (French pronunciation: [ɔbəʁʃtajnbax, -bɛʁ-, -bak]) is a commune in the Bas-Rhin department in Grand Est in north-eastern France.

== See also ==
- Communes of the Bas-Rhin department
