= Dambach, Bas-Rhin =

Dambach Dàmbàch
- Commune
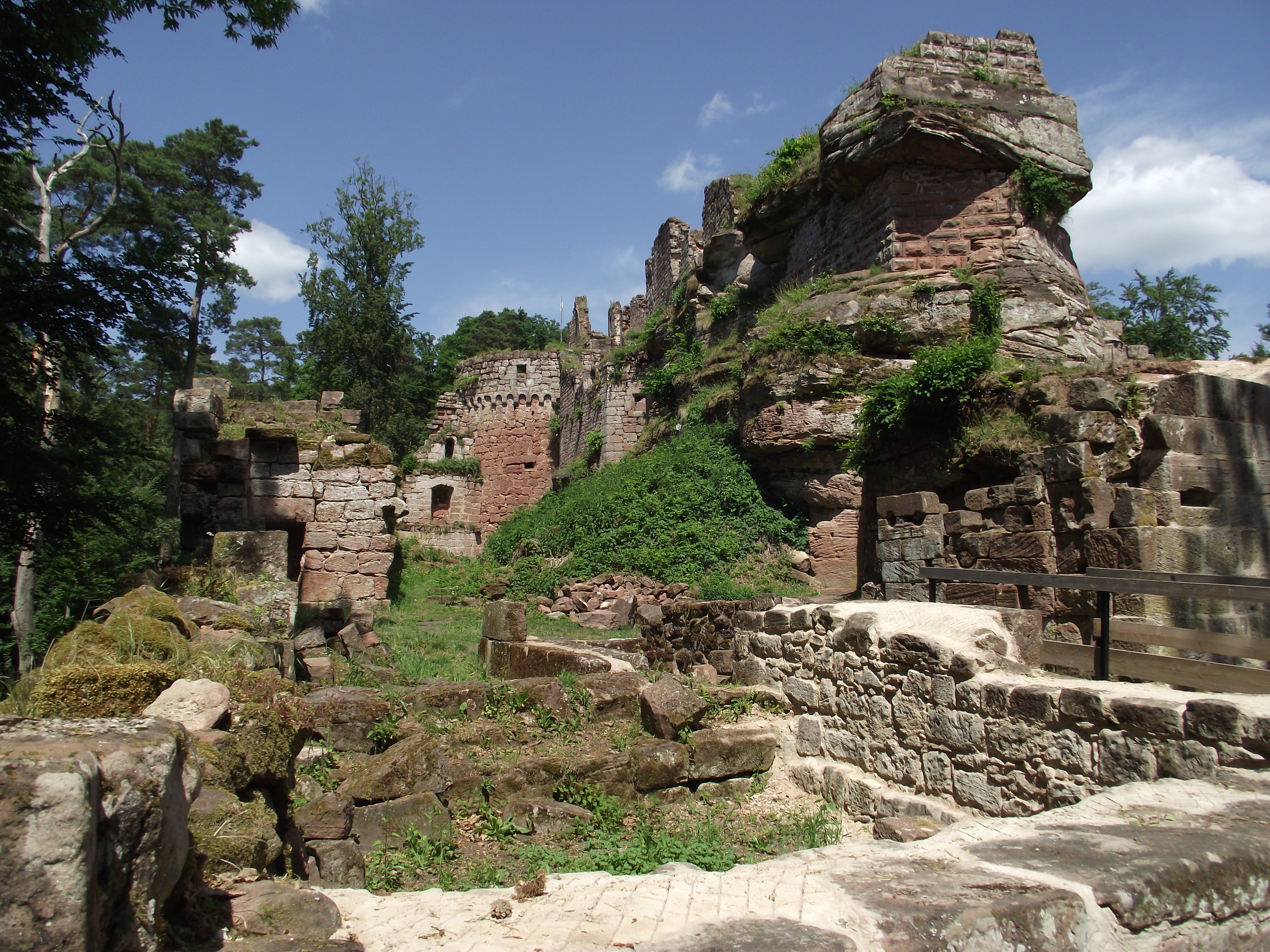
- The ruins of the château of Schoeneck in Dambach

- Coat of arms
- Location of Dambach
- Location within France Location within Grand Est
- Coordinates: 49°00′13″N 7°37′54″E
- Country: France
- Region: Grand Est
- Department: Bas-Rhin
- Arrondissement: Haguenau-Wissembourg
- Canton: Reichshoffen

Government
  - Mayor (2020–2026): Joël Herzog
- Area^{1}: 30.5 km^{2} (11.8 sq mi)
- Highest elevation: 567 m (1,860 ft)
- Lowest elevation: 215 m (705 ft)
- Population (2023): 757
  - Density: 24.8/km^{2} (64.3/sq mi)
- Time zone: UTC+01:00 (CET)
  - Summer (DST): UTC+02:00 (CEST)
- INSEE/Postal code: 67083 /67110
- ^{1} French Land Register data, which excludes lakes, ponds, glaciers > 1 km^{2} (0.386 sq mi or 247 acres) and river estuaries.

Dambach is a commune in the Bas-Rhin department in Grand Est in north-eastern France.

== See also ==
- Communes of the Bas-Rhin department
