= Allenwiller =

- Part of Sommerau
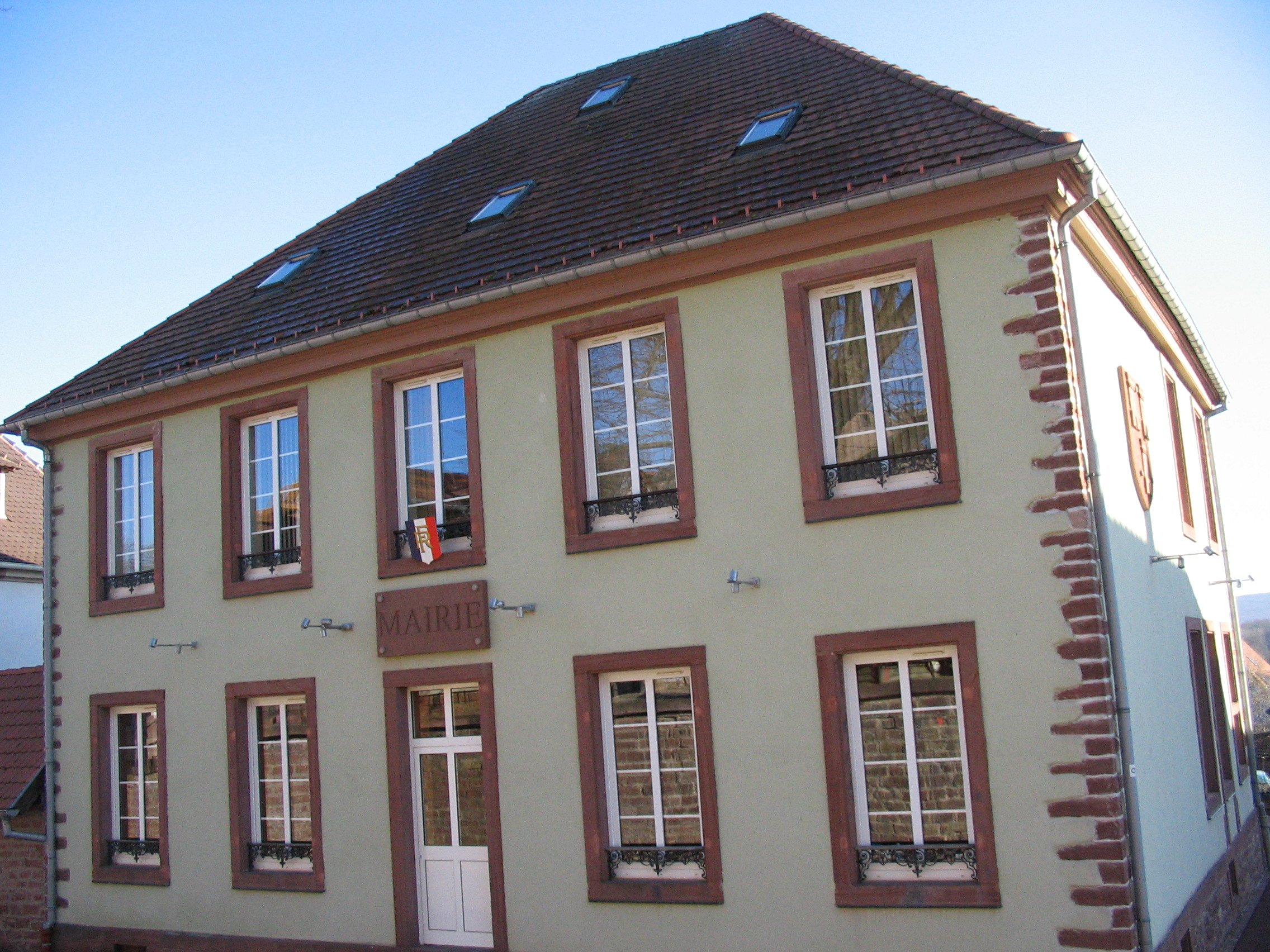
- Allenwiller Town Hall

- Coat of arms
- Location of Allenwiller
- Location within France Location within Grand Est
- Coordinates: 48°39′21″N 7°22′35″E
- Country: France
- Region: Grand Est
- Department: Bas-Rhin
- Arrondissement: Saverne
- Canton: Saverne
- Commune: Sommerau
- Area^{1}: 5.96 km^{2} (2.30 sq mi)
- Highest elevation: 400 m (1,300 ft)
- Lowest elevation: 225 m (738 ft)
- Population (2022): 521
  - Density: 87.4/km^{2} (226/sq mi)
- Time zone: UTC+01:00 (CET)
  - Summer (DST): UTC+02:00 (CEST)
- Postal code: 67310
- ^{1} French Land Register data, which excludes lakes, ponds, glaciers > 1 km^{2} (0.386 sq mi or 247 acres) and river estuaries.

Allenwiller (French pronunciation: [alənvilɛʁ]; Alsatian: Àllewiller) is a former commune in the Bas-Rhin department in the Grand Est region of northeastern France. On 1 January 2016, it was merged into the new commune Sommerau.

== Geography ==
A small village in the Bas-Rhin department in the Alsace region, Allenwiller is part of the Canton of Saverne. It is located at an altitude of 242 metres and neighbours the communes of Salenthal and Singrist. The commune has an area of 596 hectares.

Allenwiller is located about 35 kilometres west by north-west of Strasbourg and 10 km south of Saverne. The nearest store and railway station are at Marmoutier about 7 kilometres to the north.

=== Distances ===
All distances are road distances measured from road D817 (Rue de Romanswiller). From Allenwiller to:

- Saverne 12 km;
- Strasbourg: 35 km;
- Colmar: 80 km;
- Mulhouse: 117 km;
- Metz: 135 km.

The largest town near Allenwiller is the town of Saverne, located northwest of the commune.

Two rivers pass through Allenwiller: the Sommerau and the Sommergraben.

== History ==
Allenwiller has often changed ownership. First owned by the Abbey of Marmoutier, it passed to the Bishop of Metz in 828, then to the lords of Ochsenstein in 1187, to the County of Zweibrücken-Bitsch in 1485, to Hanau-Lichtenberg in 1570, then finally to Hesse-Darmstadt in 1736.

Successive names of Allenwiller were:

- Alenevilla (10th century);
- Alhinwilre (13th century);
- Alhenwilre (14th century);
- Alenwilre (15th century);
- Alenweiler;
- then Allenwiller.

The first written record of the existence of Allenwiller traces back to the 10th century.

The origin of the coat of arms was from Ochsenstein Castle near Reinhardsmunster, via the forest house of Haberacker. This fortress had three interconnected castles.

The village often served as a pledge in return for a loan or debt.

In 1641 there were more people living in Allenwiller but the Thirty Years' War, poverty, famine, and pestilence destroyed the village. The repopulation of the village was carried out by families from Switzerland, Tyrol, Vorarlberg, and Normandy.

=== Heraldry ===
Arms of Allenwiller	Blazon: Argent, 3 towers Gules 2 and 1 embattled of 5 pieces, port the same, masoned in sable.

== Administration ==
List of Successive Mayors

From	To	Name
2001	2016	Roger Muller

== Demography ==
The inhabitants of the commune are known as Allenwillerois or Allenwilleroises in French.

Historical population

Year	Pop.	±% p.a.
1793	632	—
1800	458	−4.50%
1806	445	−0.48%
1821	458	+0.19%
1831	487	+0.62%
1836	496	+0.37%
1841	507	+0.44%
1846	483	−0.97%
1851	467	−0.67%
1856	433	−1.50%
1861	424	−0.42%
1866	465	+1.86%
1872	445	−0.73%
1875	506	+4.38%
1880	460	−1.89%
1885	430	−1.34%
1890	406	−1.14%
1895	393	−0.65%

Year	Pop.	±% p.a.
1900	393	+0.00%
1905	415	+1.10%
1910	405	−0.49%
1921	400	−0.11%
1926	402	+0.10%
1931	401	−0.05%
1936	365	−1.86%
1946	363	−0.05%
1954	369	+0.21%
1962	358	−0.38%
1968	381	+1.04%
1975	378	−0.11%
1982	393	+0.56%
1990	418	+0.77%
1999	453	+0.90%
2007	501	+1.27%
2012	526	+0.98%
2022	521	−0.10%

Source: EHESS and INSEE

=== Repopulation after the Thirty Years War ===
Kieffer, in his Pfarrbuch of Hanau-Lichtenberg, published a survey dating from 1641. This is the statement of the royalties due to the lord. It lists all the different posts and after each post, there is the word "Nichts" meaning nil. It ends with the line "Wagenfrohnden nichts" meaning nothing. The explanation lies in a footnote: "es ist keine lebendige Seele mehr in Allenwiller" (there is no longer a living soul in Allenwiller).

In order to repopulate the village families came from Switzerland: the Clauss family, the Mullers, and the Zimmermanns came from the Bernese Oberland; the Gass family and The Steiners came from Basel. These people left their countries because the economic situation there was unenviable and a peasant revolt had been severely repressed. Other families came from Tyrol and Vorarlberg.

Still others came from Normandy. The Lord of Birkenwald, Gabriel du Terrier, brought families from his native province of Normandy. Their names underwent some modifications to French:

- Bastien = Bastian
- Messance = Messang
- Rollin = Rolling
- La Vitte = Virra = Wetha = Wetta

In 1687 Pierre Vitta was the manager of Birkenwald Castle.

== Education ==
Students from Allenwiller attend nursery school in the commune. The primary school is at Salenthal. College students go to the Leonardo da Vinci College at Marmoutier and high school students go to the Leclerc school or to Haut-Barr in Saverne. In late 2011 a new school was built as an inter-school for the three villages that are in the regional grouping (RPI) (Allenwiller, Salenthal, and Birkenwald).

== Economy ==
There was a sawmill in the village but it was sold. The nearest grocery store is at Romanswiller. A hypermarket is at Marmoutier. The courts are at Saverne and Strasbourg.

An Alsatian theatre takes place from February to May, but not every year for various reasons.

== Culture and heritage ==
=== Civil heritage ===
The commune has a number of buildings and structures that are registered as historical monuments:

- A Napoleonic Resting Bench at CD 817 (1855) There are many "Napoleonic" benches dated 1811 - the date of birth of Napoleon II. There is a "Eugenie" bench named after Empress Eugenie, wife of Napoleon III. These benches are dated 1854, 1855 and 1856. When the first trains connected the larger communities, these benches facilitated travel in the countryside. Erected every 2 km, there were 448 in the Bas-Rhin department. As victims of road widening they gradually disappeared and one was stolen on 3 November 2010 for unknown reasons.
- A Farmhouse at 1 Rue du Cimetière (1669)
- A Flour Mill at 2-4 Rue d'Obersteigen (18th century)
- A Farmhouse at 19 Rue Principale (1727)
- A Farmhouse at 22 Rue Principale (18th century)
- A Farmhouse at 29 Rue Principale (1791)
- A Farmhouse at 37 Rue Principale (1798)
- A Farmhouse at 6 Rue Principale (1792)
- A Cooper's Farmhouse at 7 Rue de Romanswiller (1732)
- Houses and Farms

=== Religious heritage ===
The commune has several religious buildings and sites that are registered as historical monuments:

- A Cemetery (1847). The current cemetery is common to both Catholics and Protestants. A special collection helped to erect the cross in the middle of the cemetery also dated September 1847. The cemetery contains two items that are registered as historical objects:
  - All movable items in the Cemetery
  - The Cemetery Cross (1847)
- The Protestant Church of Saint-Michel (1739). "Keyser Schulteis 1739" is the text above the entrance which provides information on the date of construction of the present nave. Some stones and other traces of the old tower prove the existence of a very old Romanesque nave followed by a Gothic nave. The Romanesque bell tower has three floors with the ground floor serving as the choir. The eucharistic wall cabinet is dated 1473 and it resembles the wall tabernacle that is in the sacristy of Salenthal from 1465. The church contains several items that are registered as historical objects:
  - The Furniture in the Church (Supplementary list)
  - The Tomb of Katharina Osterman (1840)
  - The Tomb of Peter Steiner (1818)
  - The Tomb of Johannes Schweihard Metz (1814)
  - A Protestant Box of Hosts (1830)
  - A Protestant Paten (1830)
  - A Communion Goblet (1830)
  - A Communion Ewer (18th century)
  - A Baptismal basin (18th century)
  - The Organ (1876)
  - A Monumental Painting (1908)
  - A Pastoral Chair (19th century)
  - A Eucharistic Cabinet (1473)
- The Protestant Presbytery (18th century)
- The Parish Church of Saint-Michel (1905). The church is in the Gothic Revival style. The stones are a beautiful Vosges sandstone from a local quarry. The laying of the cornerstone took place on 29 September 1905 and the church was opened on 29 September 1906 - a record construction time which deserves mention. Formerly, Catholics and Protestants used the same church for 219 years. On 28 August 1939 it came close to disaster when lightning struck the steeple. The priest Bernhart was absent and it was Pastor Gerold who gave the alarm. Able-bodied men were mobilized. These improvised firefighters saved the building taking many risks. The church contains Furniture (Supplementary list) which is registered as an historical object. Since the fire many works have been carried out:
  - Painting, upgrading of the organ, heating, paving, tiling
  - Double glazing, a wooden ceiling, painting, sound system.
  - These works are financed by a charity fair, a theatre, voluntary work, and anonymous benefactors.

=== Picture Gallery ===
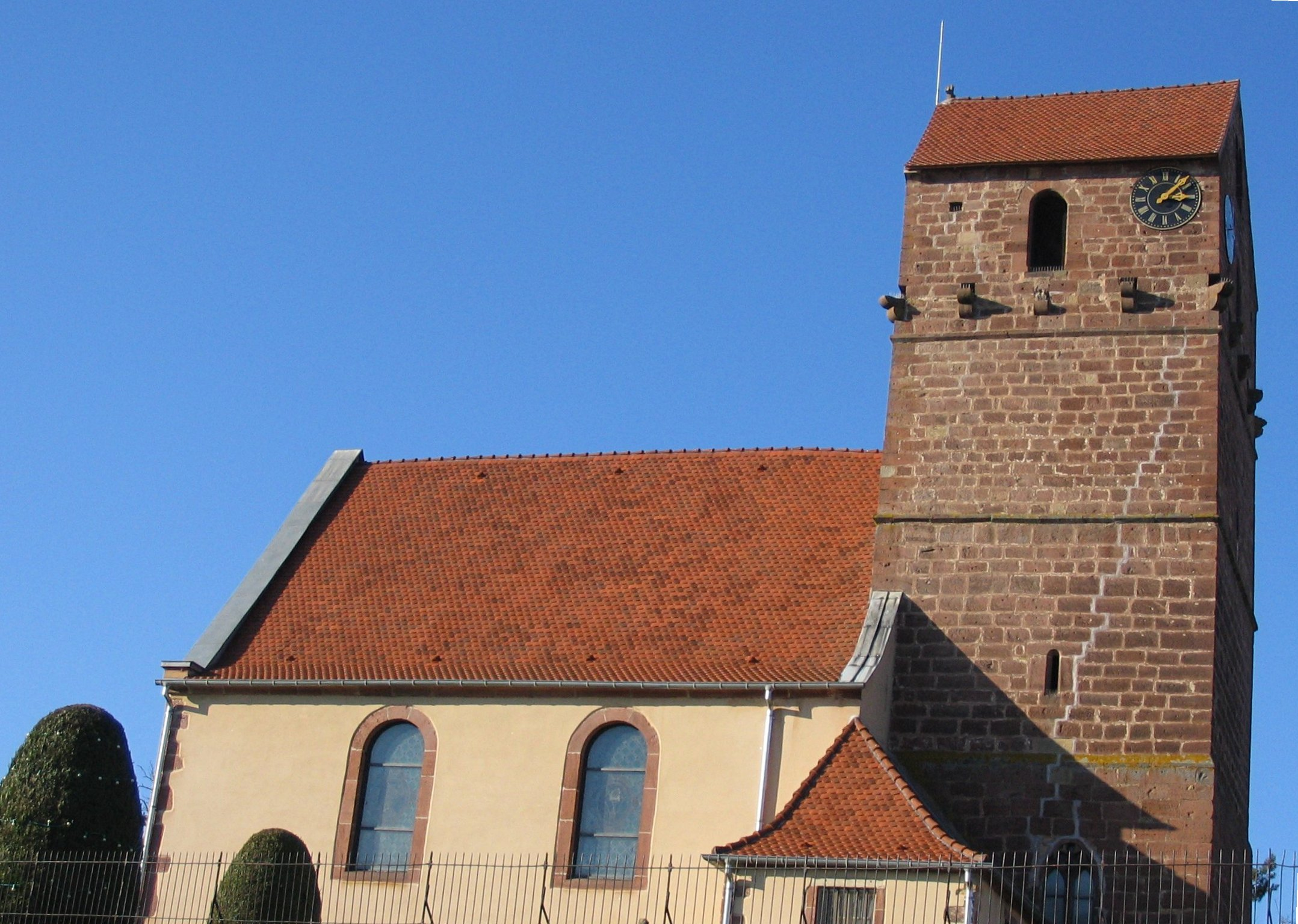
Protestant Church

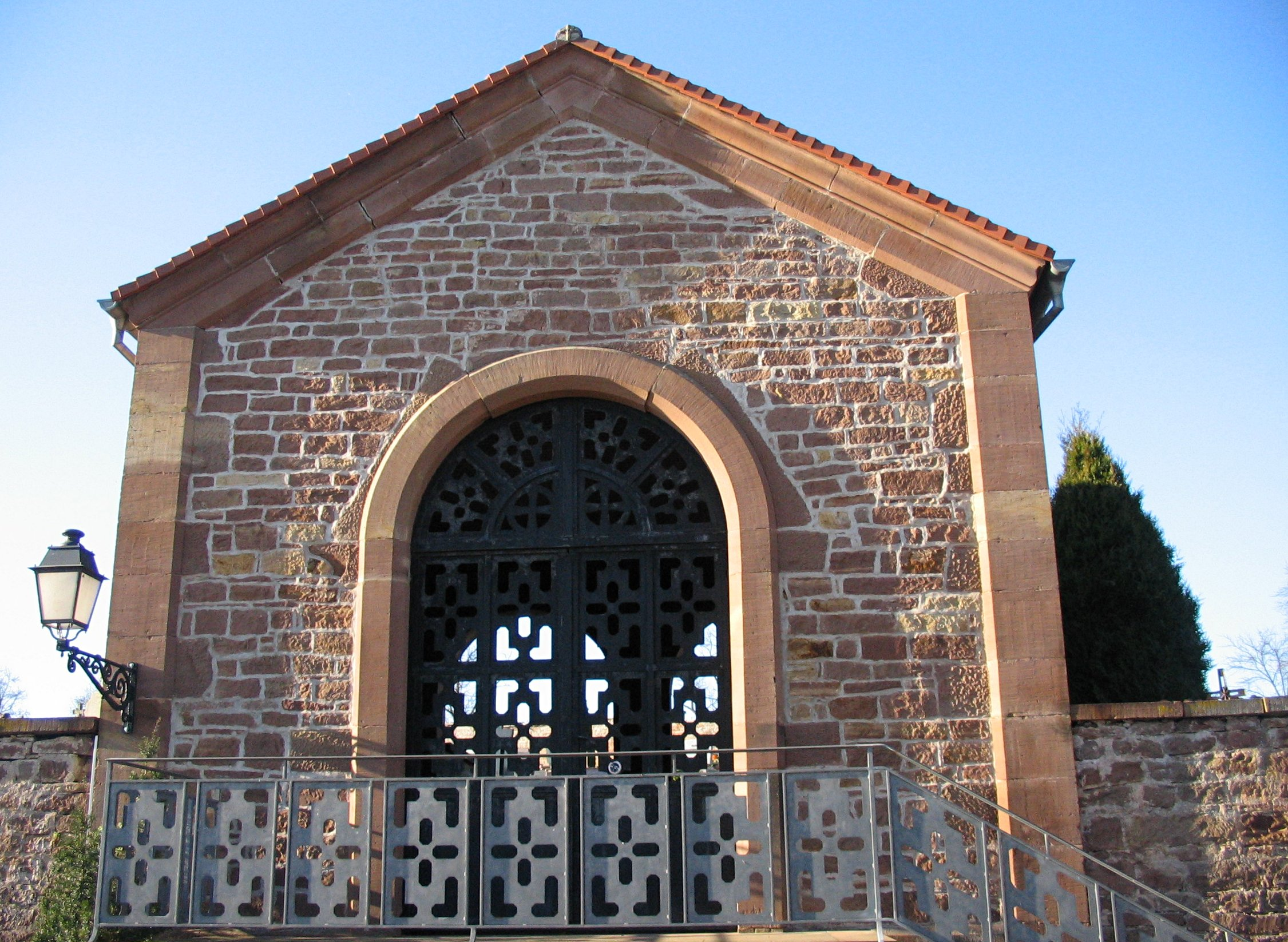
Entrance to the Cemetery

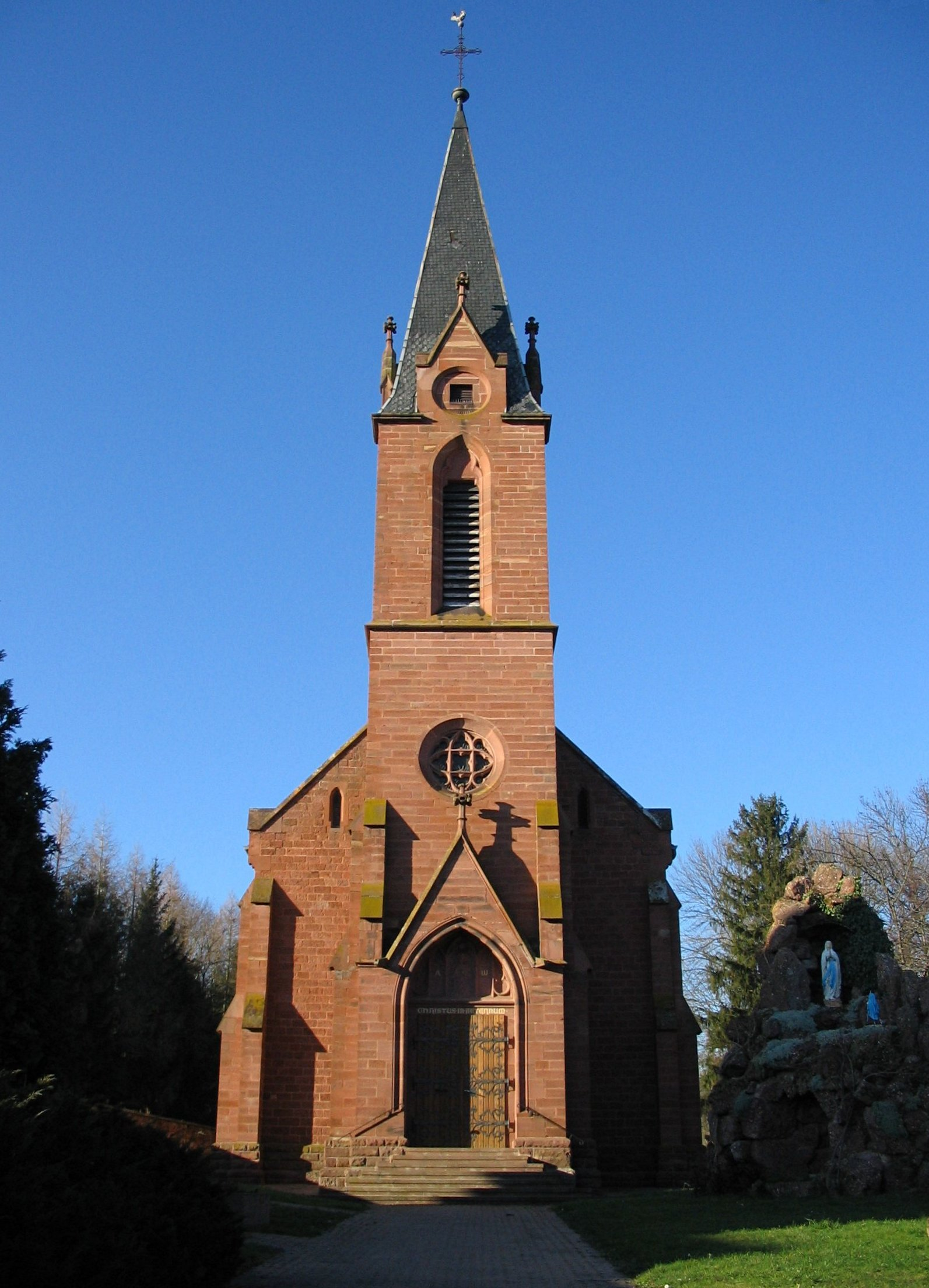
Catholic Church

== Events and celebrations in Allenwiller ==
- The first Sunday of October: Messti for the village.

== See also ==
- Communes of the Bas-Rhin department
- Communes of the Bas-Rhin department sorted by arrondissements and cantons
- Communities of Communes of the Bas-Rhin département
- Arrondissements of the Bas-Rhin département
- Cantons of the Bas-Rhin département
