= Hengwiller =

Hengwiller Hangwiller
- Commune
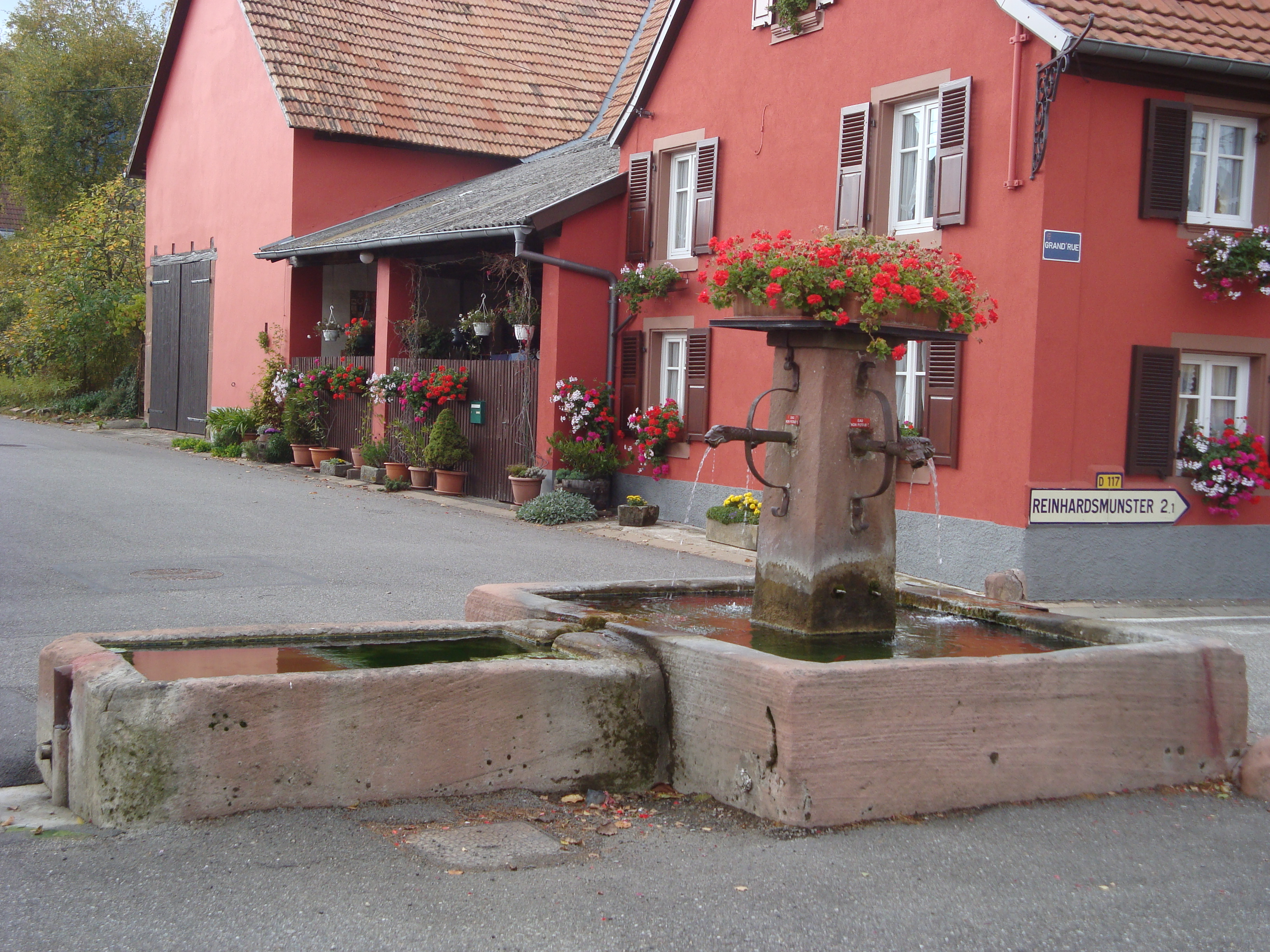
- The fountain in Hengwiller

- Coat of arms
- Location of Hengwiller
- Location within France Location within Grand Est
- Coordinates: 48°40′05″N 7°20′02″E
- Country: France
- Region: Grand Est
- Department: Bas-Rhin
- Arrondissement: Saverne
- Canton: Saverne

Government
  - Mayor (2020–2026): Marcel Blaes
- Area^{1}: 2.15 km^{2} (0.83 sq mi)
- Highest elevation: 400 m (1,300 ft)
- Lowest elevation: 275 m (902 ft)
- Population (2023): 198
  - Density: 92.1/km^{2} (239/sq mi)
- Time zone: UTC+01:00 (CET)
  - Summer (DST): UTC+02:00 (CEST)
- INSEE/Postal code: 67190 /67440
- ^{1} French Land Register data, which excludes lakes, ponds, glaciers > 1 km^{2} (0.386 sq mi or 247 acres) and river estuaries.

Hengwiller (French pronunciation: [ɛŋvilɛʁ]; German: Hengweiler) is a commune in the Bas-Rhin department in Grand Est in north-eastern France.

== Geography ==
Much of the village economy is agriculture based, and most of the surrounding land is used for arable cultivation and fruit orchards.

The village is positioned not far from the Reutenburgerkopf (586 m), some ten kilometres (six miles) to the east of the panoramic Rocher de Dabo, although the distance by road is much greater because the roads necessarily take a snaking route avoiding the steepest slopes. The nearest big city is Strasbourg, some 35 kilometres (22 miles) to the east. Communes surrounding Hengwiller are Dimbsthal and Salenthal to the north-east, Birkenwald to the south-east, Obersteigen to the south-west and Reinhardsmunster to the north-west.

The village has no real main street, being rather the crossroads of several minor roads.

== See also ==
- Communes of the Bas-Rhin department
