= Château de Hohenstein =

13th-century castle in Bas-Rhin, France

Coordinates: 48°34′2″N 7°18′38″E

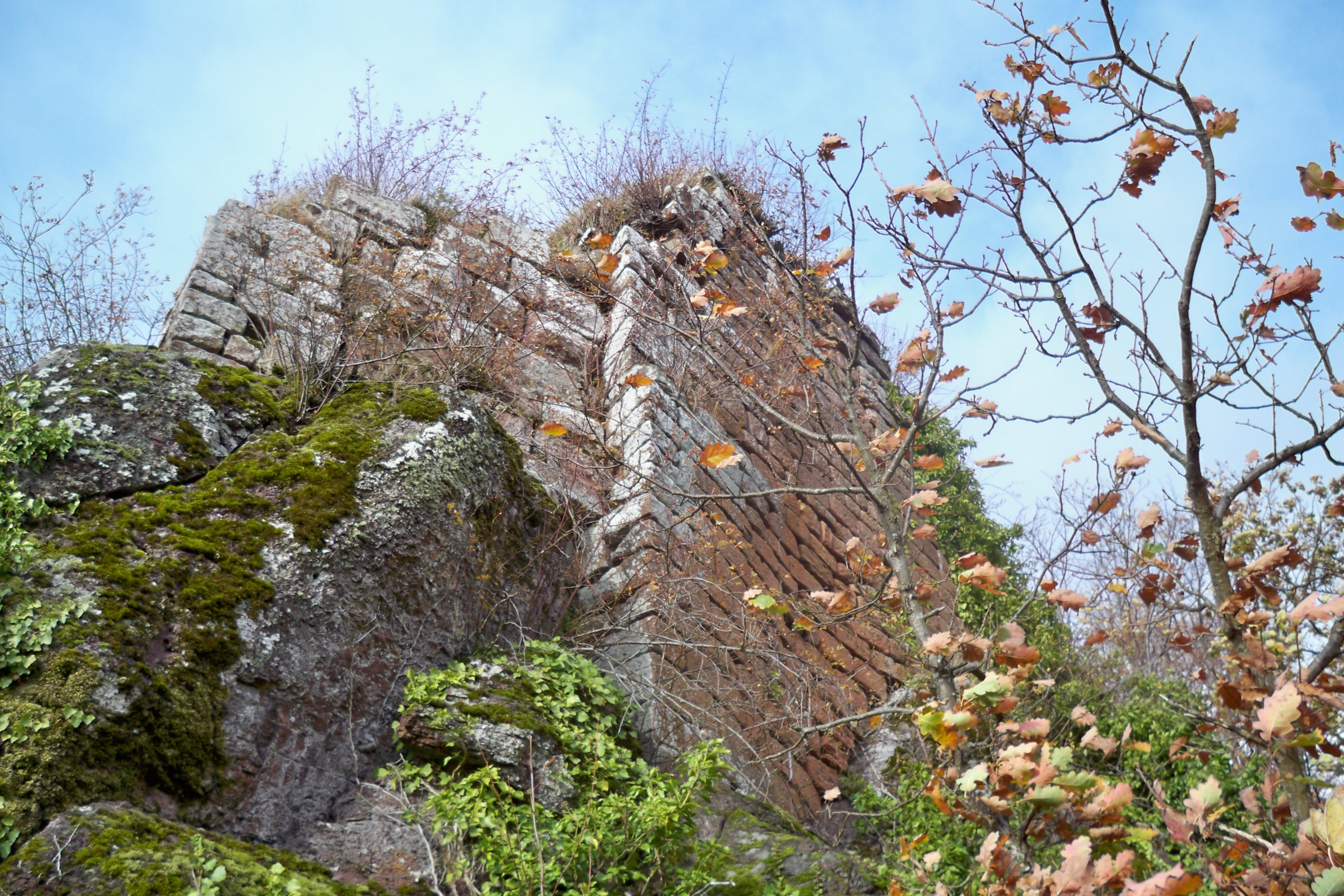

The Château de Hohenstein is a ruined castle situated on the road between Oberhaslach and Wangenbourg, not far from the Château du Nideck, in the commune of Oberhaslach in the Bas-Rhin département of France.

The property of the state, it has been listed since 1898 as a monument historique by the French Ministry of Culture.

== History ==
Constructed at the start of the 13th century, the site spreads over a rocky outcrop at an altitude of 444 m. The castle was built by the Hohenstein family and the Bishop of Strasbourg was one of the joint owners at the end of the 13th century. Bishop Berthold de Bucheck was imprisoned in the castle in 1337 by Rodolphe de Hohenstein. On his release, the bishop took the castle which did not recover from its ruin.

== See also ==
- List of castles in France
