= Birkenwald =

Birkenwald Bírikewàld
- Part of Sommerau
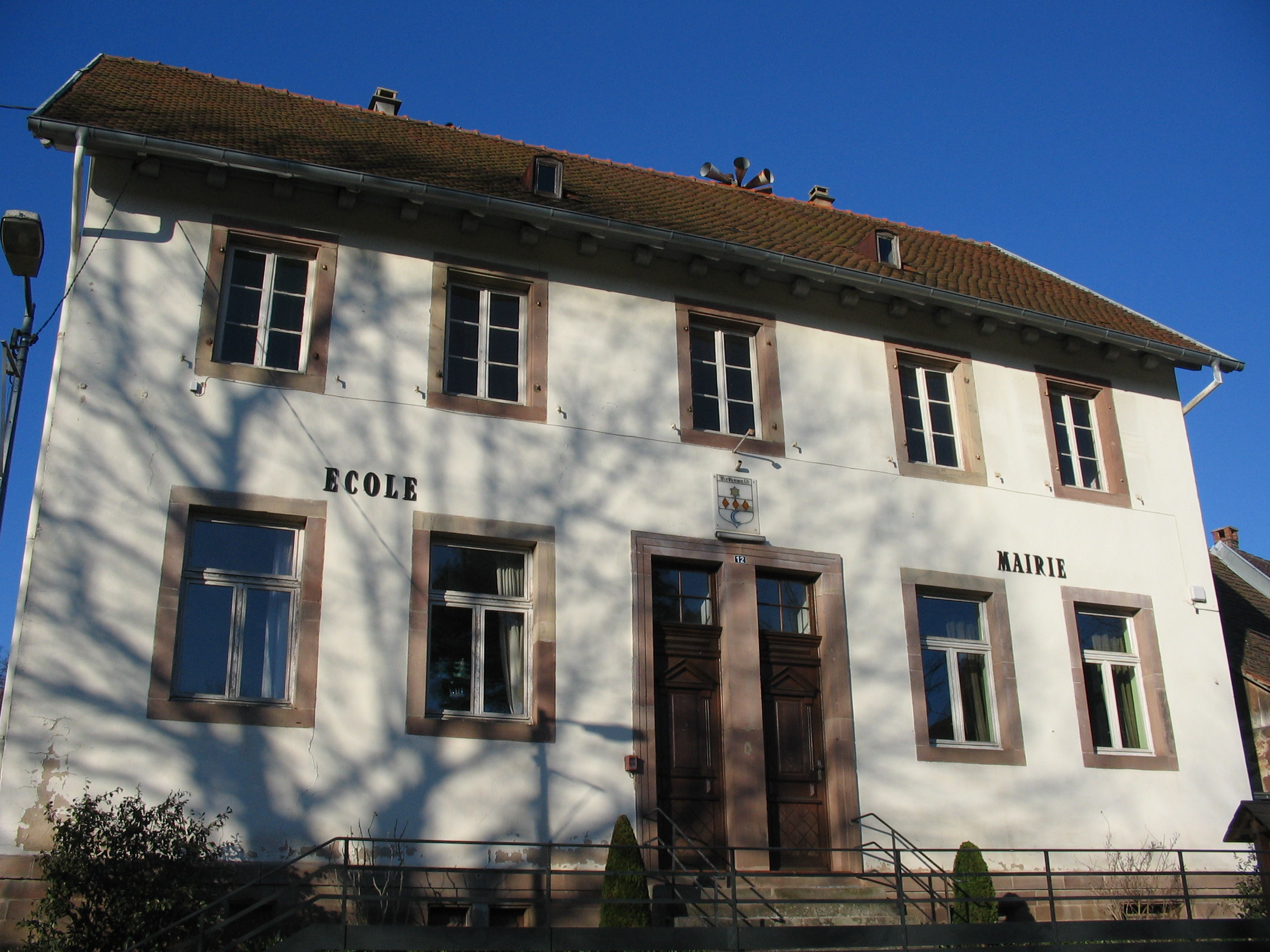
- Town hall

- Coat of arms
- Location of Birkenwald
- Location within France Location within Grand Est
- Coordinates: 48°39′34″N 7°20′43″E
- Country: France
- Region: Grand Est
- Department: Bas-Rhin
- Arrondissement: Saverne
- Canton: Saverne
- Commune: Sommerau
- Area^{1}: 5.12 km^{2} (1.98 sq mi)
- Highest elevation: 432 m (1,417 ft)
- Lowest elevation: 258 m (846 ft)
- Population (2023): 325
  - Density: 63.5/km^{2} (164/sq mi)
- Time zone: UTC+01:00 (CET)
  - Summer (DST): UTC+02:00 (CEST)
- Postal code: 67440
- ^{1} French Land Register data, which excludes lakes, ponds, glaciers > 1 km^{2} (0.386 sq mi or 247 acres) and river estuaries.

Birkenwald (Alsatian: Bìrikewàld) is a former commune in the Bas-Rhin department in northeastern France. On 1 January 2016, it was merged into the new commune Sommerau.

== Geography ==
Birkenwald is located at the foot of Vosges Mountains, in the small valley formed by Sommerau river, that feeds the Mossig. It limits with Dimbsthal and Salenthal at northeast, Allenwiller at east, Wangenbourg-Engenthal at southwest and Hengwiller at northeast. The landscape in the south of the commune is mostly dominated by forests. Other areas surrounding it are covered by meadows and fruit trees, located in an inhabited area.

The National Route 4 is 2.5 miles away, connecting the town to Strasbourg and Saverne. The communal road 229 connects the town with Dimbsthal and Obersteigen. The public transportation of Birkenwald is managed by Low-Rhine 67 network, line 404.

== History ==
The commune was established on 17 February 843. The village probably was formerly located on the hillside where a vault was found which dated from 1751. Château de Birkenwald was built in 1562 in the Renaissance style. I

== Gallery ==
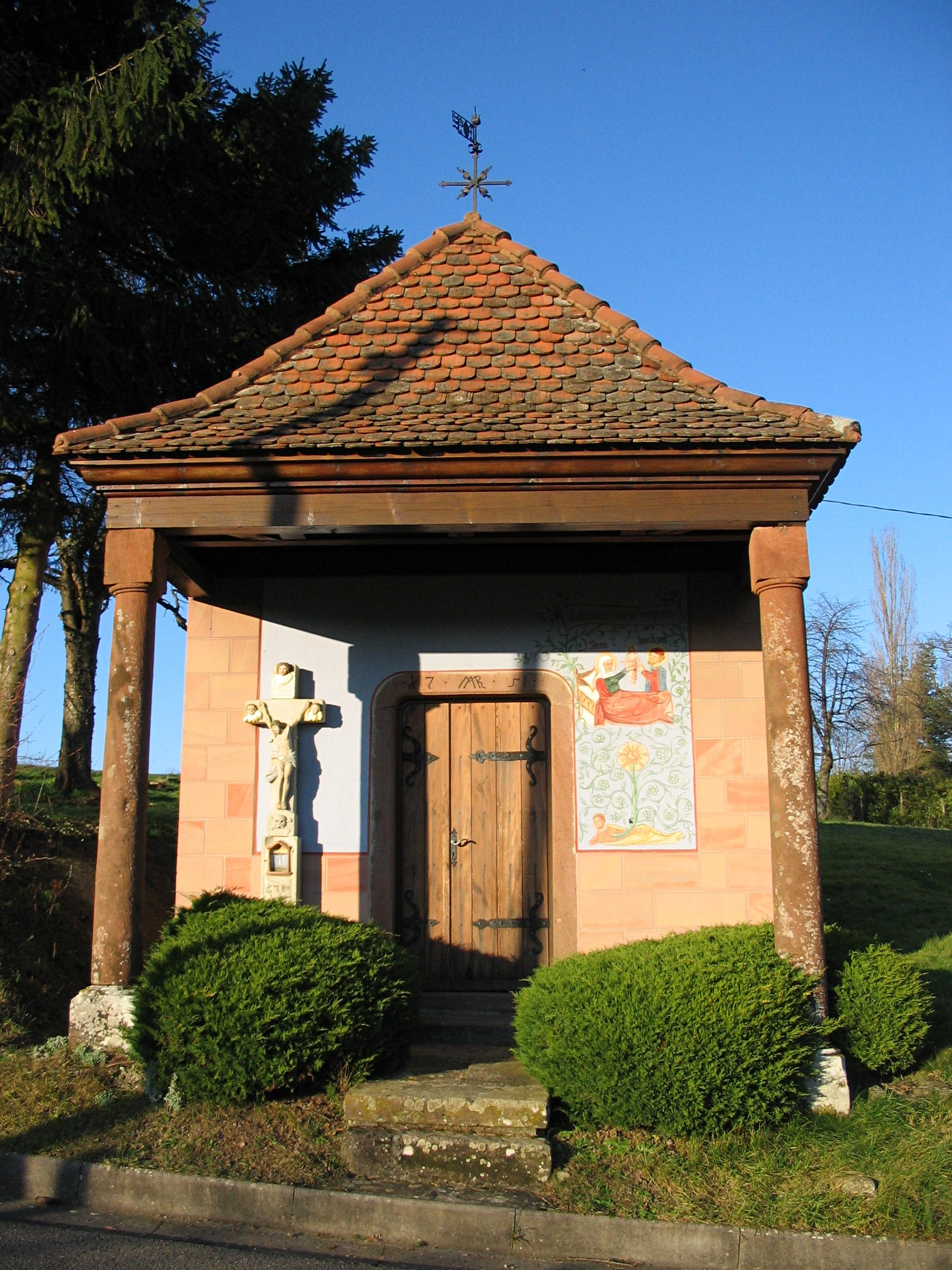
Notre-Dame Chapel (1751)

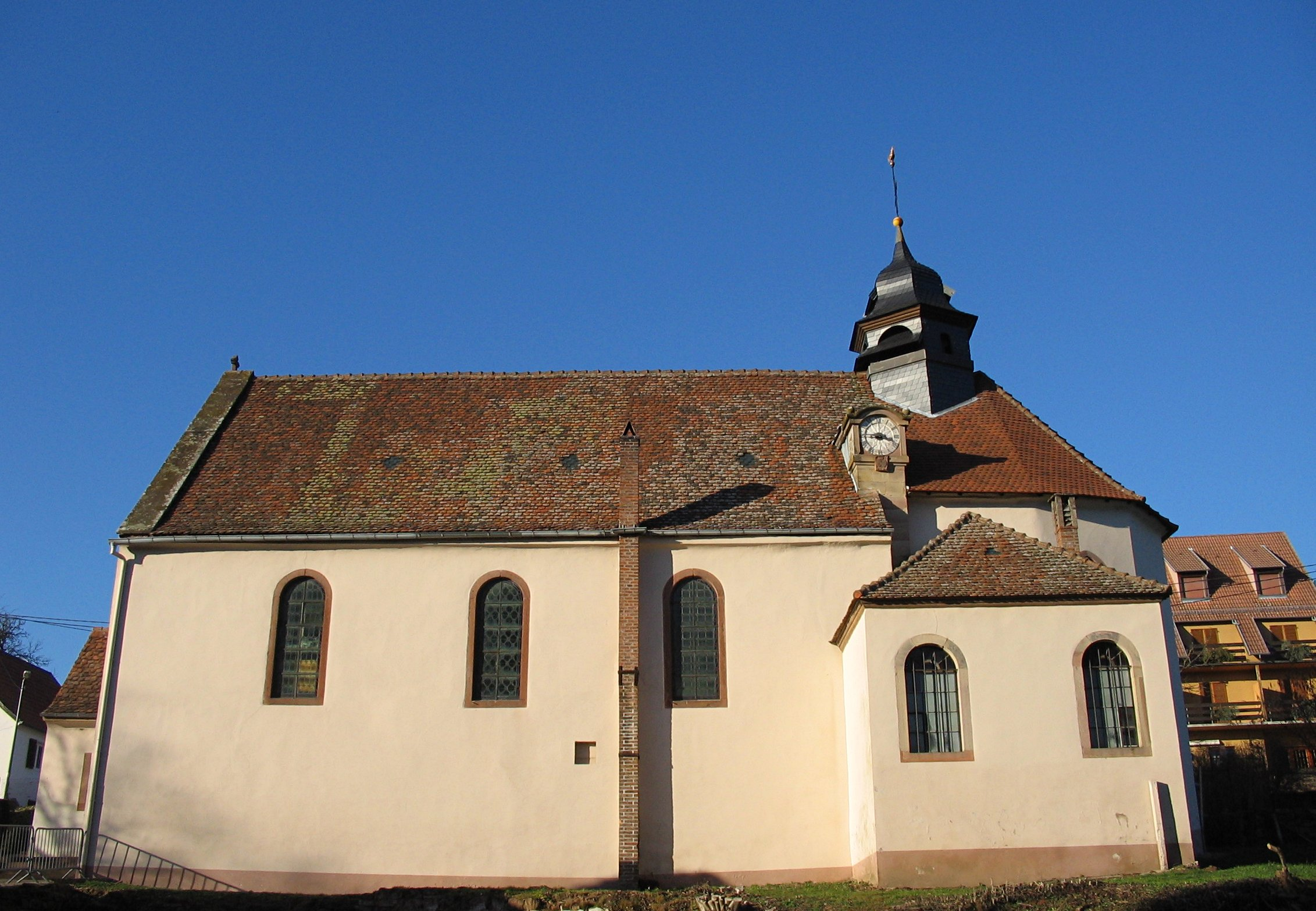
Saint-Louis church

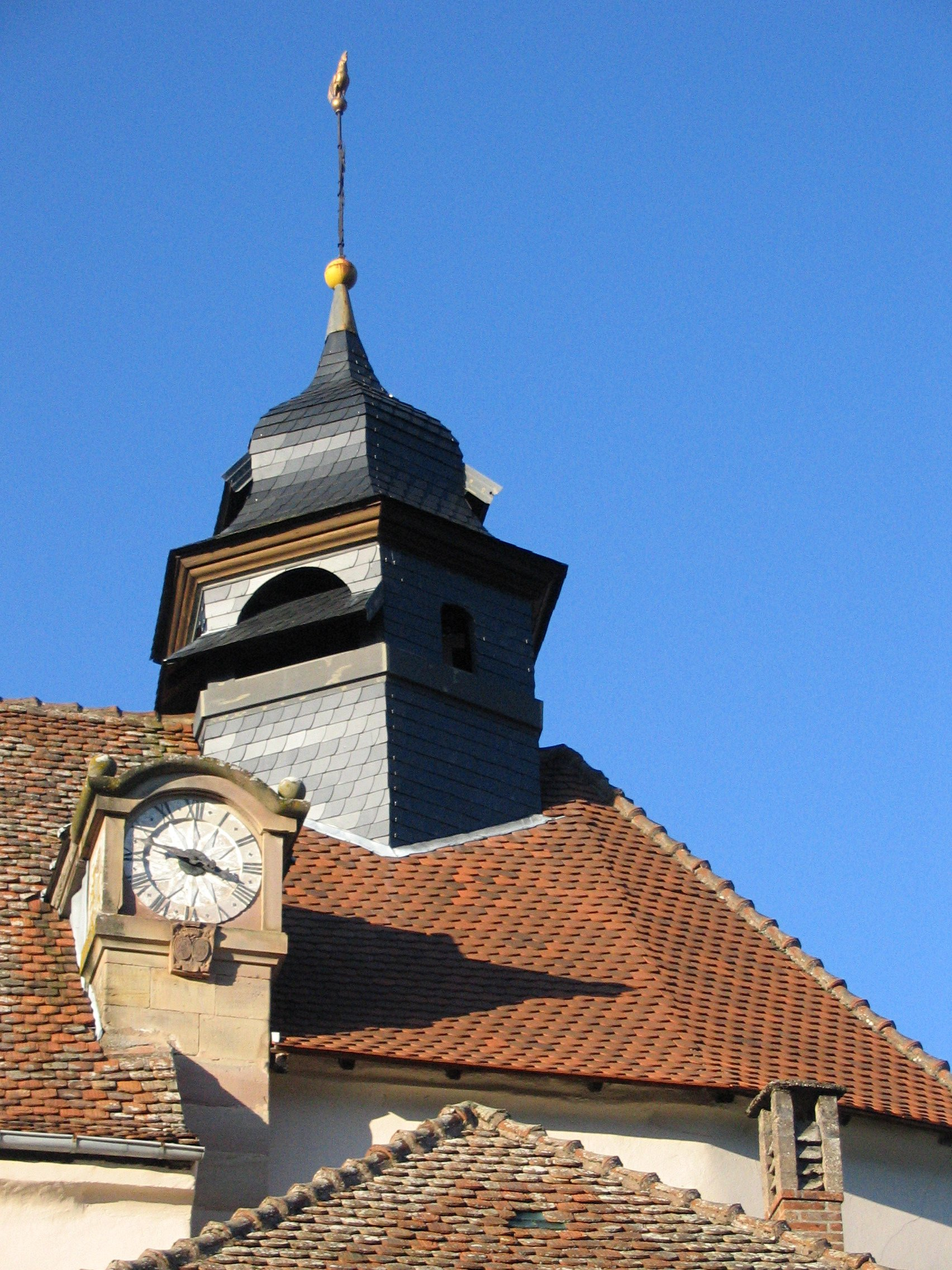
Church bell detail

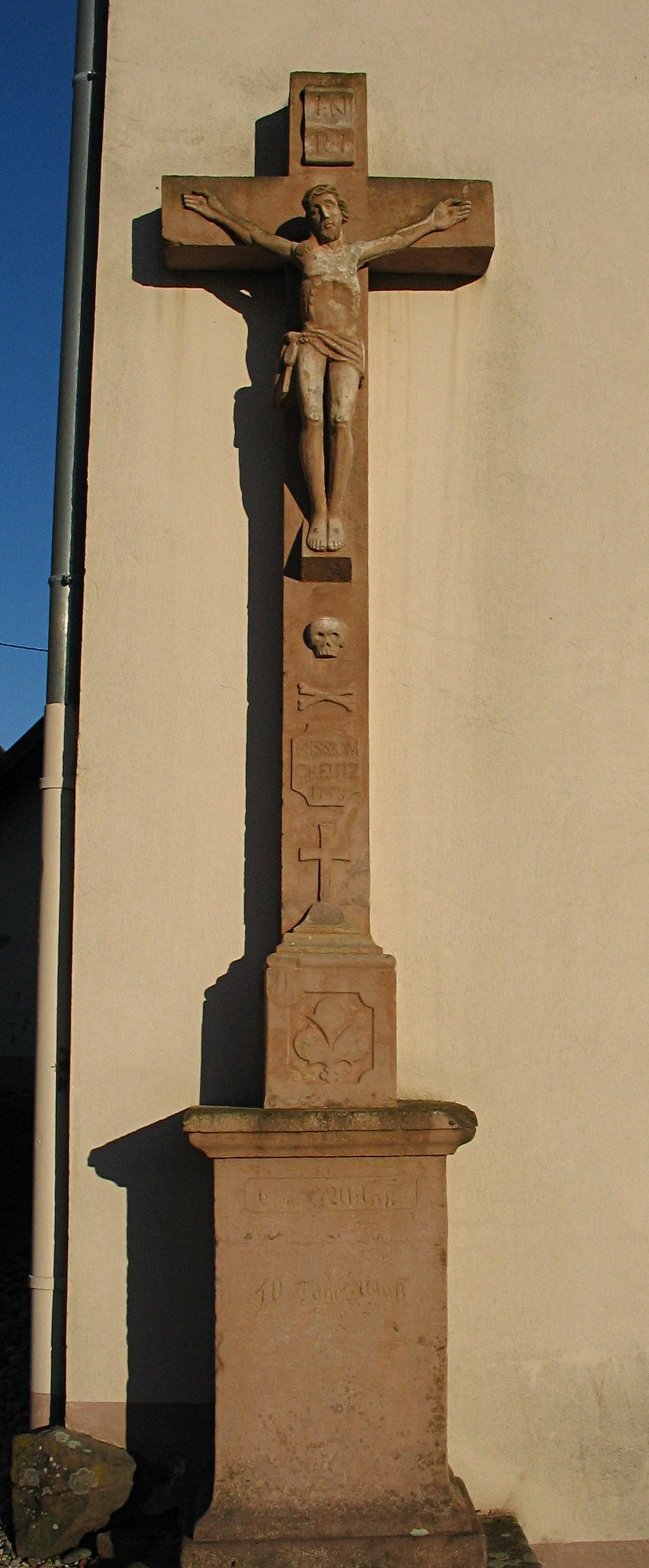
Mission Cruise (1758)

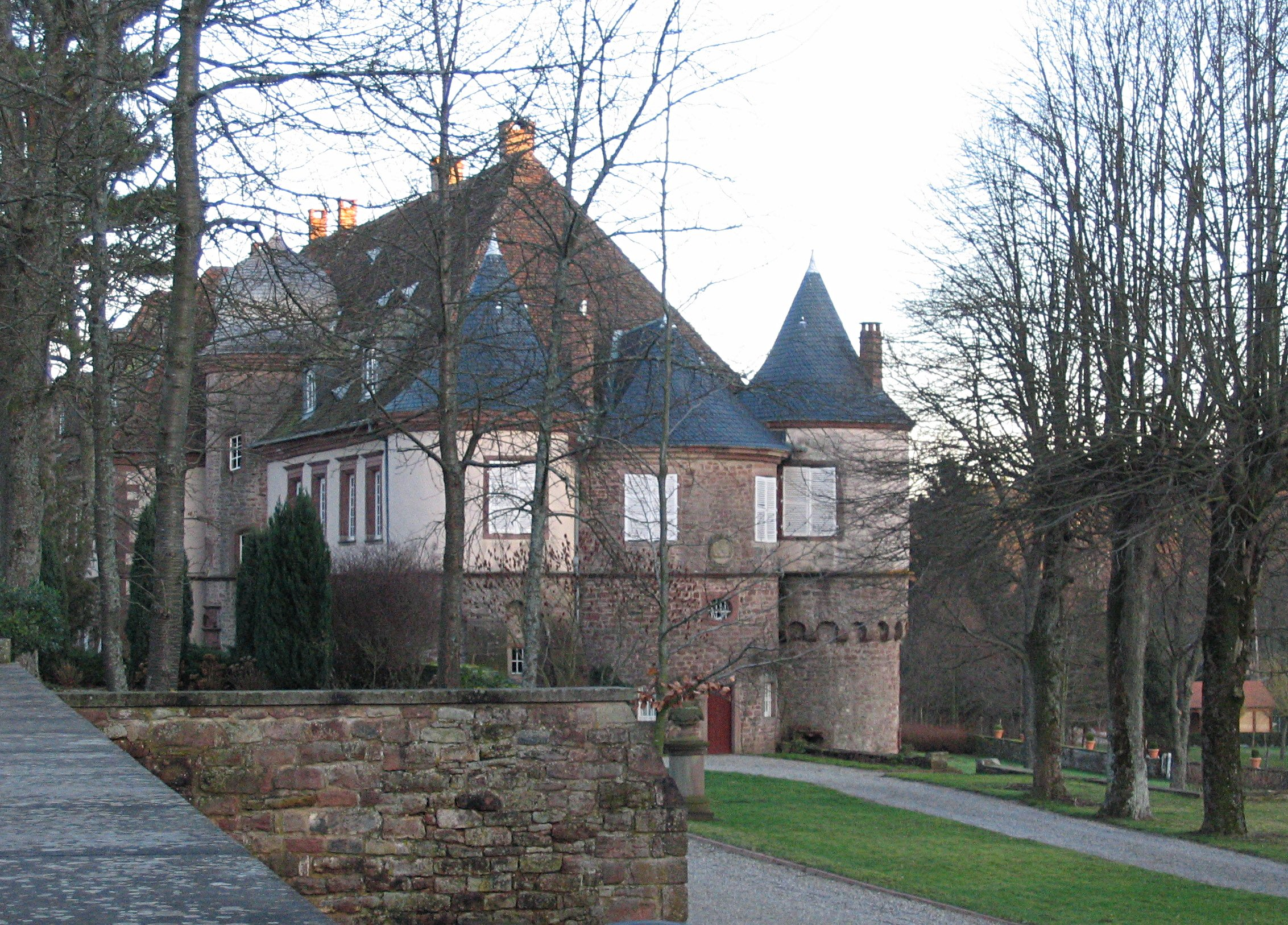
Birkenwald Castle

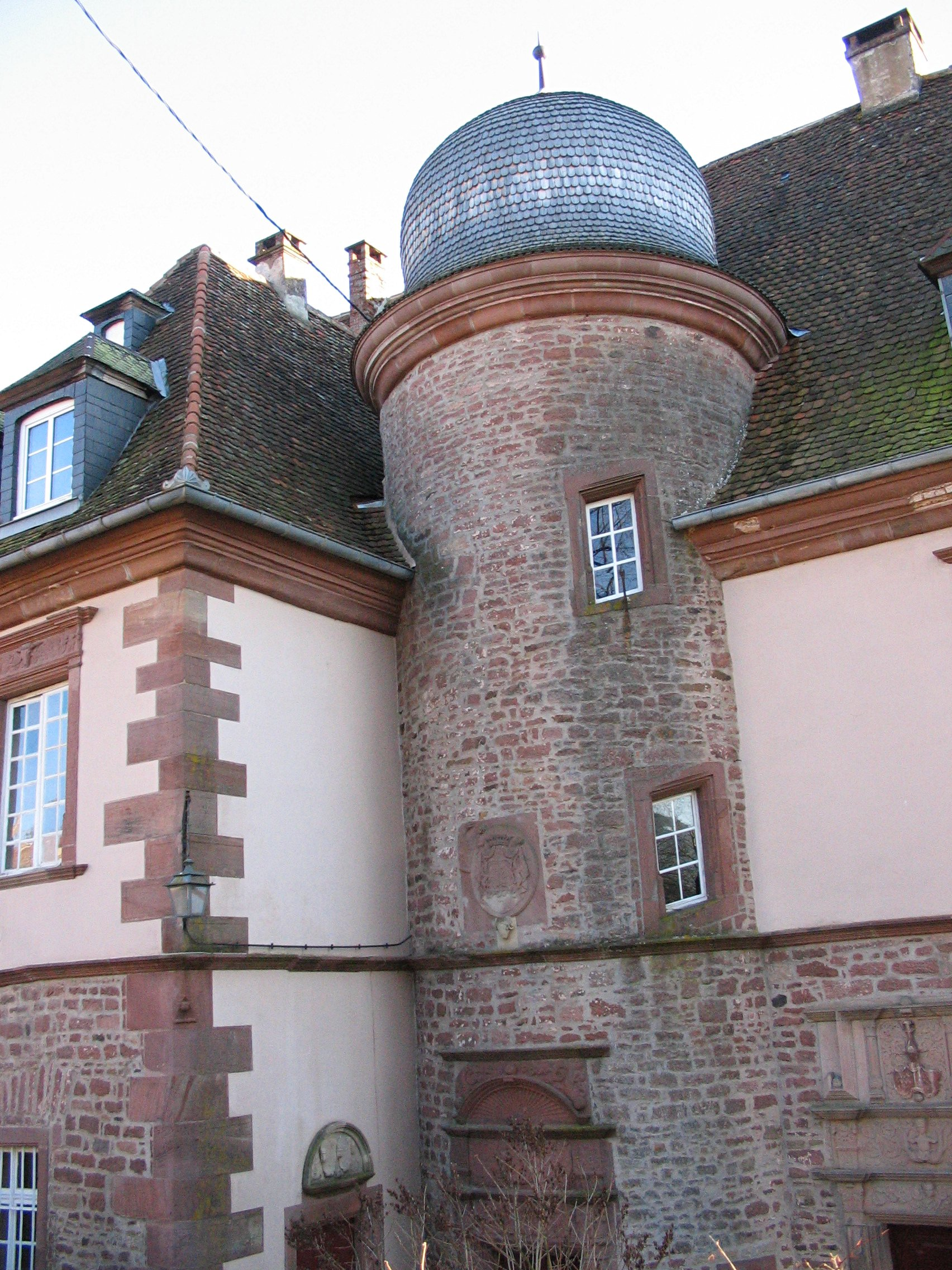
Castle Detail

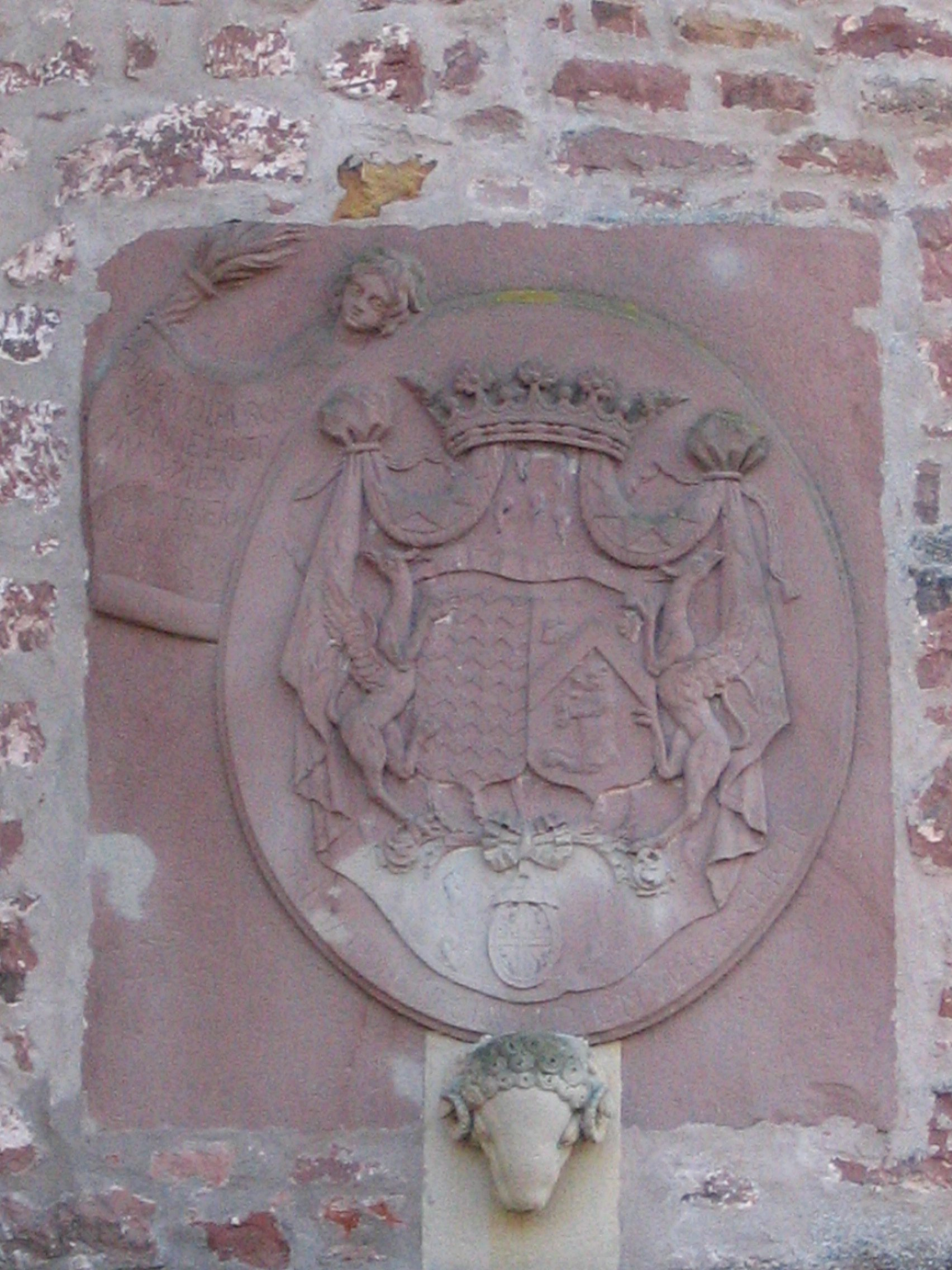
Bas-relief

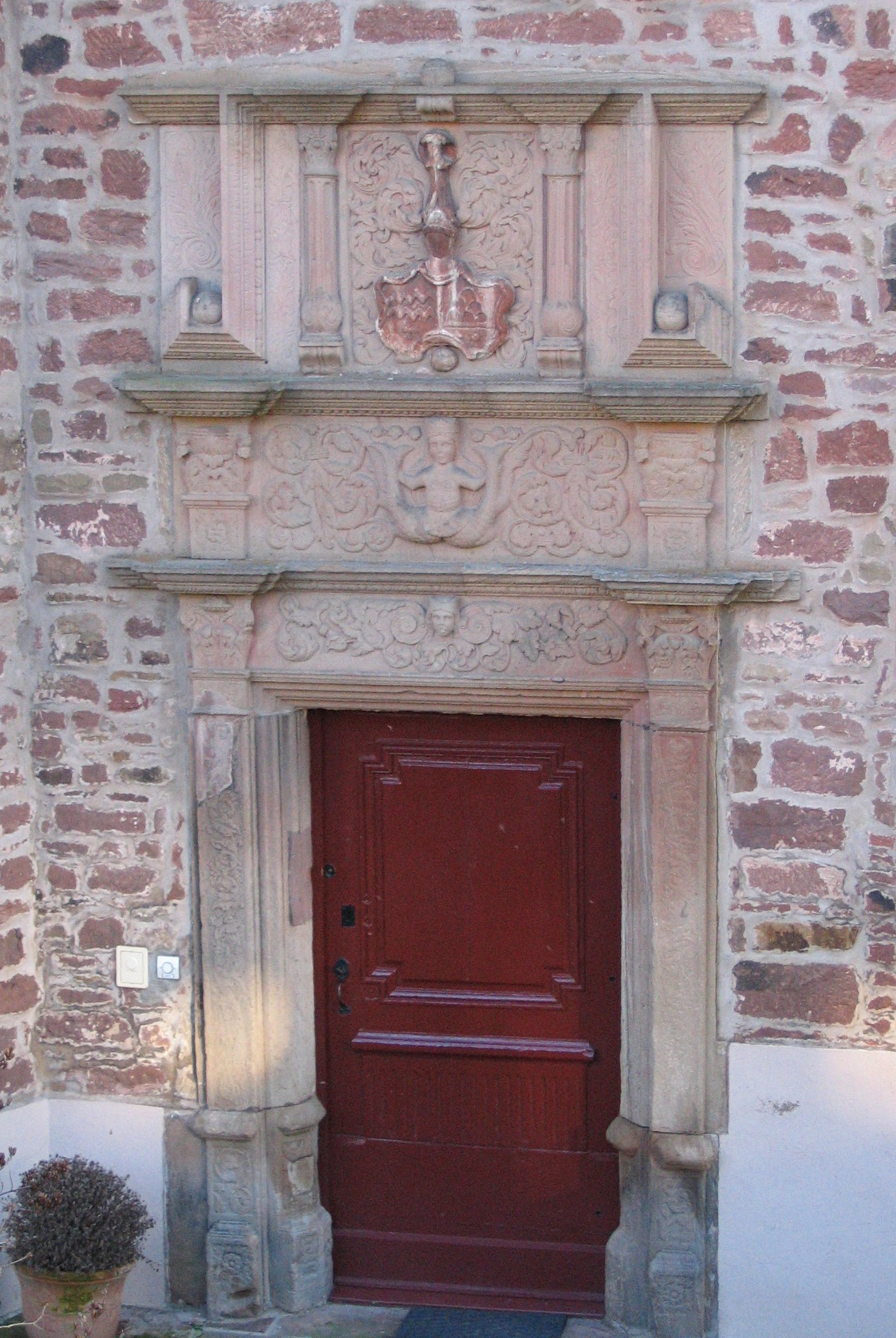
Bas-relief

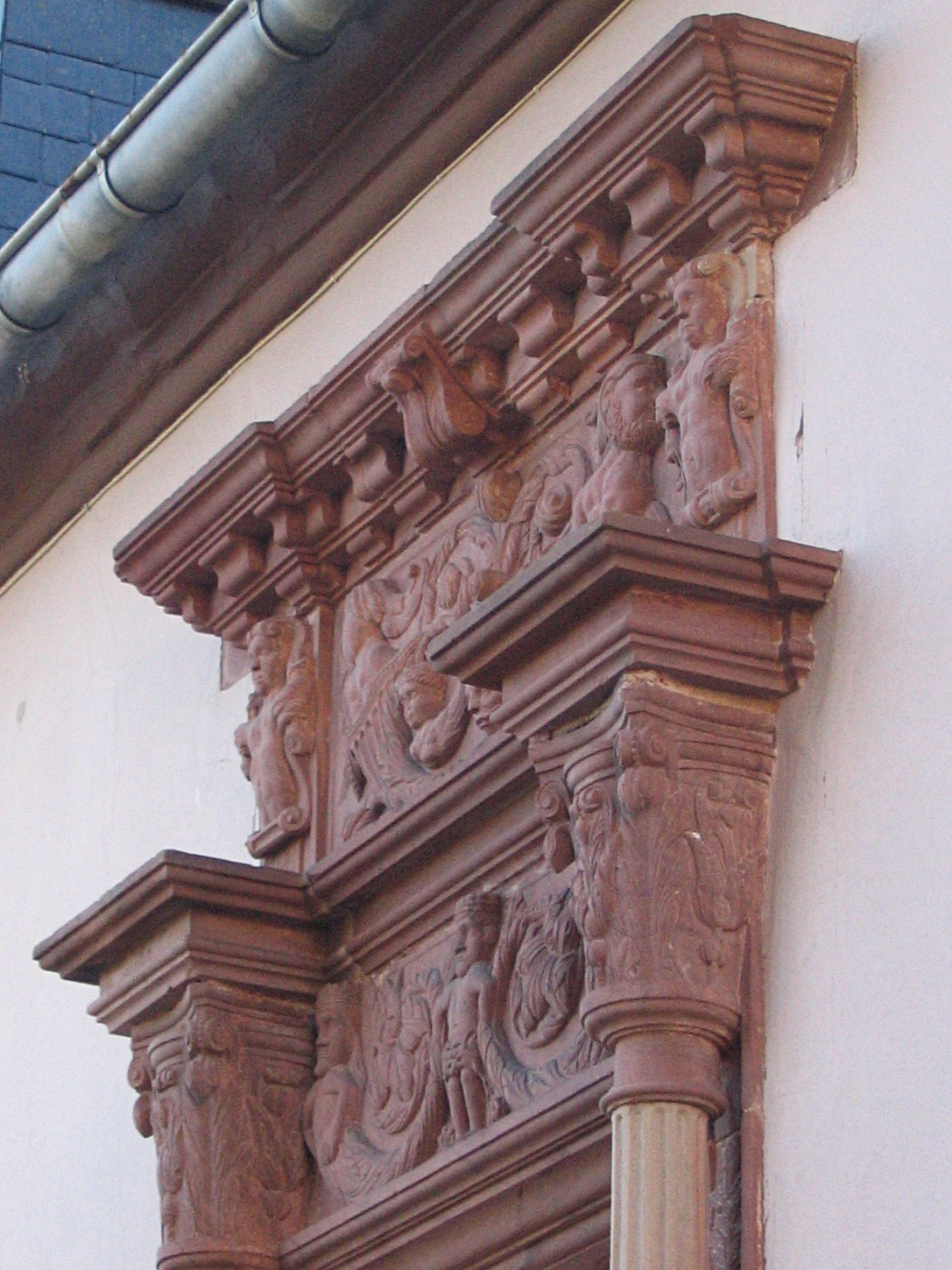
Ornamentations

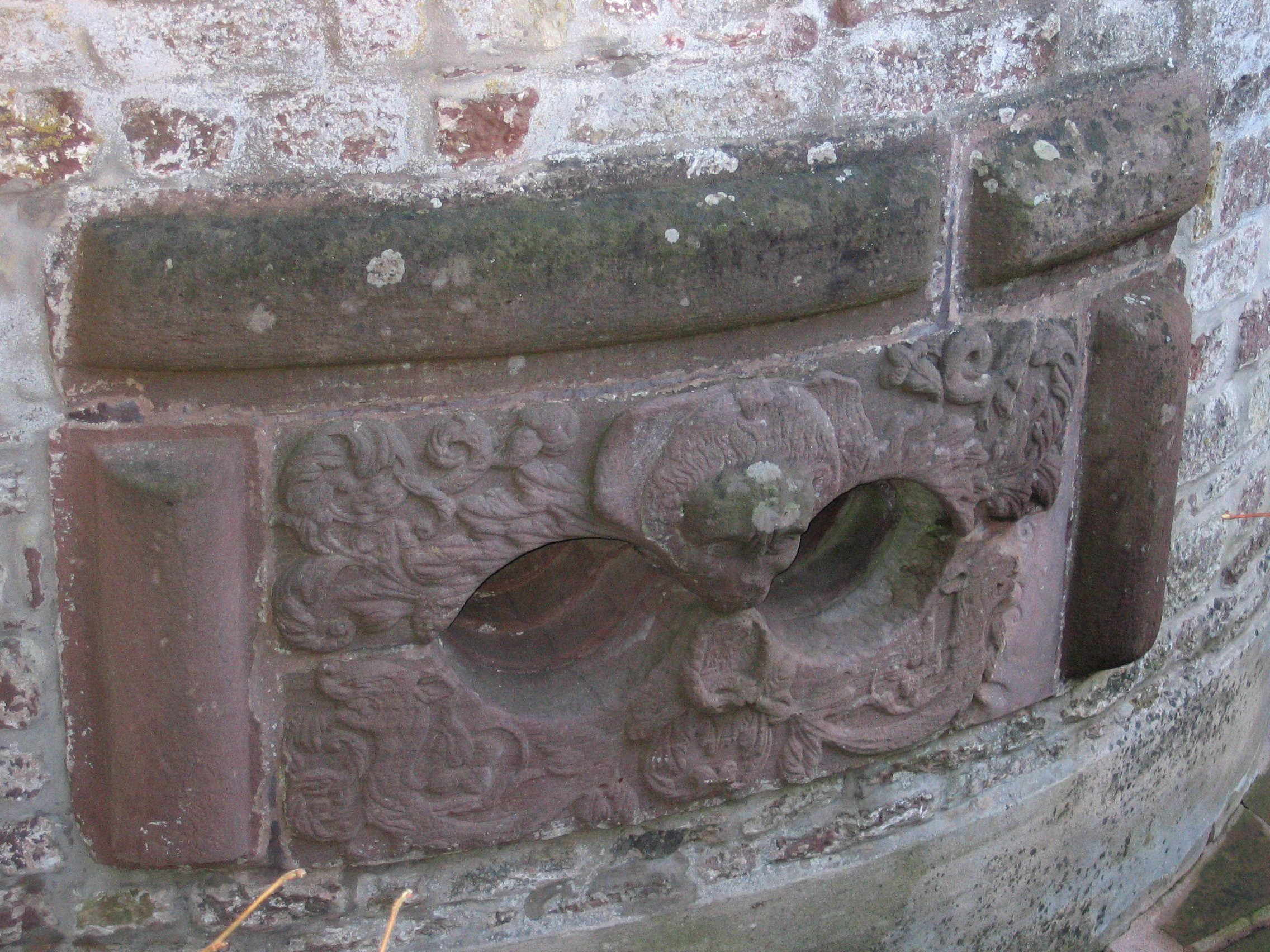
Ornamentations

== See also ==
- Communes of the Bas-Rhin department
