= Château du Nideck =

Ruined castle in Bas-Rhin, Grand Est, France

Coordinates: 48°34′47″N 7°16′59″E

The Château du Nideck is a ruined castle located in the commune of Oberhaslach in the Bas-Rhin département of France.

== History ==
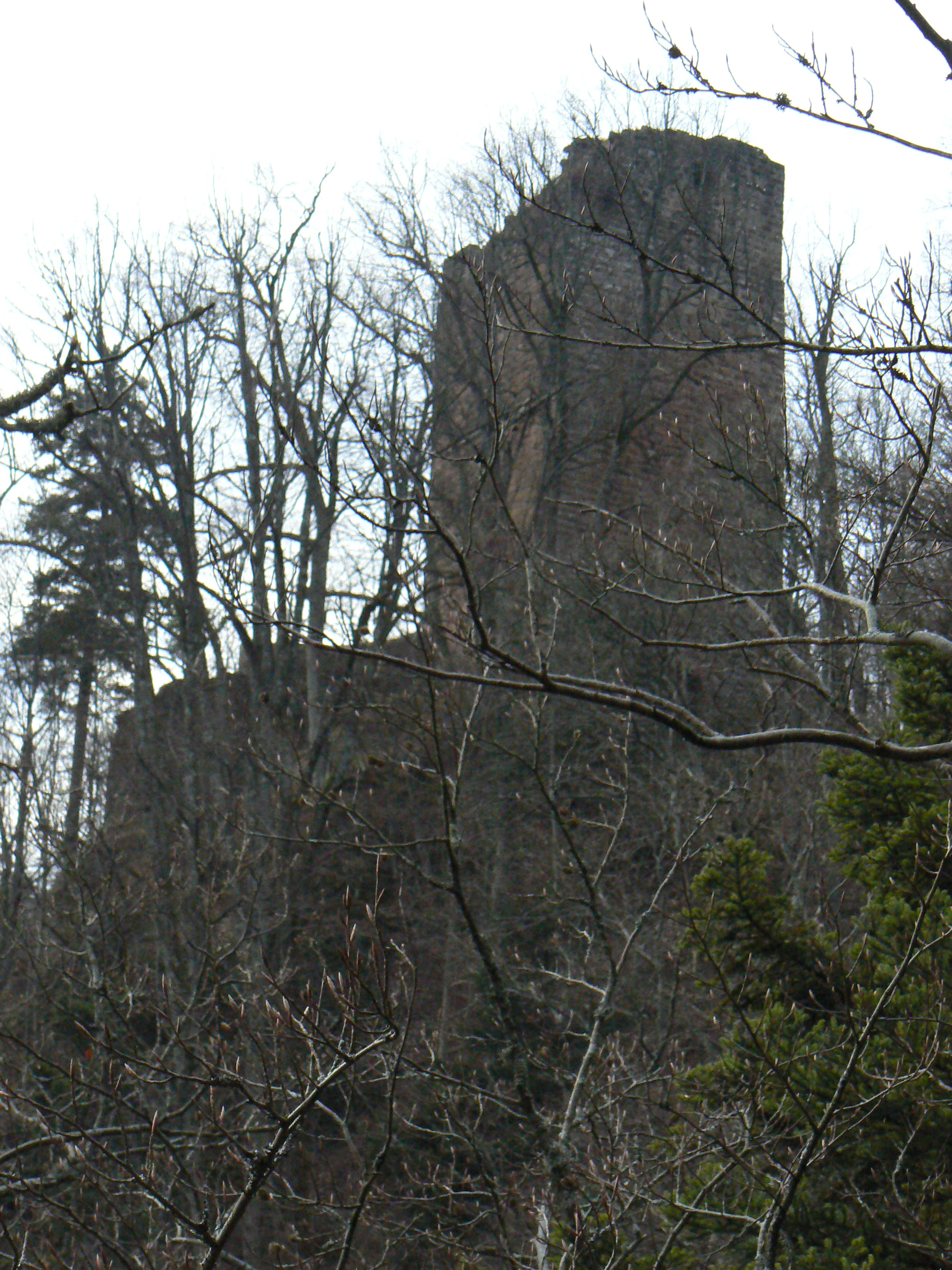

Situated on the heights of the road from Oberhaslach to Wangenbourg, the castle was first mentioned in a charter in 1264, as the property of sire Bourckard, burgrave of Nideck. In 1336 there is mention of a second castle, below the first, fief of the Bishop of Strasbourg and held by the landgraves of Basse-Alsace.

Nideck then became the property of the seigneurs of the region, in the 14th and 15th centuries, according to the various regional conflicts and other events of the time. It was besieged by the Strasbourgeois in 1448. The Müllenheim family took possession of the castle and kept it until 1509. It was finally destroyed by a fire in 1636.

The castle overlooks the Nideck waterfall and is easily reached on foot. The castle has been listed since 1898 by the French Ministry of Culture as a monument historique and is owned by the state.

== The Legend of Nideck ==
In 1816 the legend of Nideck joined the fairy tale of the Brothers Grimm «Das Riesen-Spielzeug» (The Giant's Toy). This story inspired the poet Adalbert von Chamisso to write Das Riesenfräulein (The Giant's Daughter). The tale relates how the castle was inhabited by a couple of giants and their little daughter. Bored one day, she walked as far as the Alsace plains and found what she took to be some living toys. Once returned to the castle, her father explained to her that they were men and that they must be left in their place because they cultivated the land to feed the giants.

== See also ==
- List of castles in France
