= Sommerau, Bas-Rhin =

Sommerau
- Commune
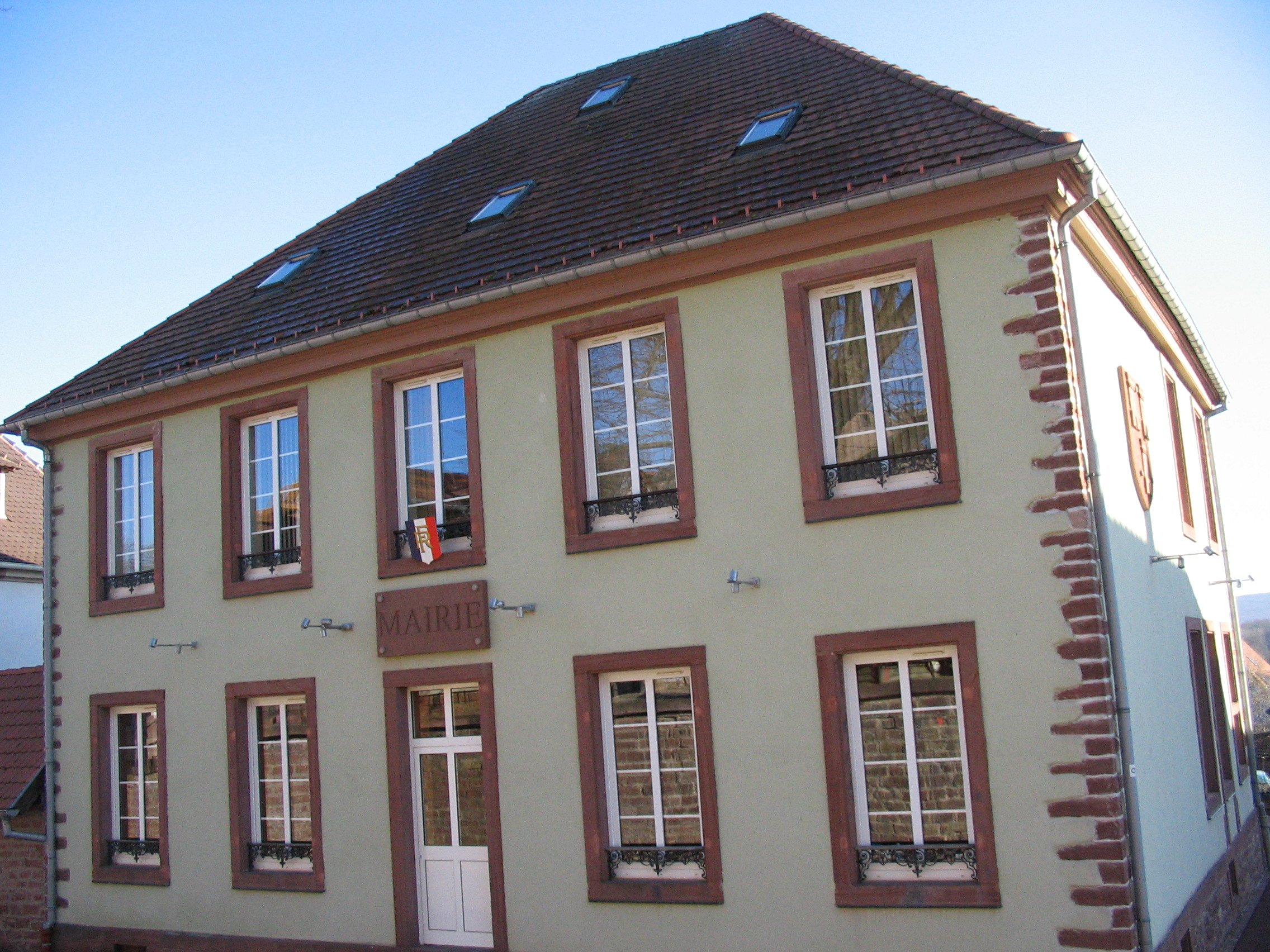
- The town hall in Sommerau
- Location of Sommerau
- Location within France Location within Grand Est
- Coordinates: 48°39′18″N 7°22′30″E
- Country: France
- Region: Grand Est
- Department: Bas-Rhin
- Arrondissement: Saverne
- Canton: Saverne

Government
  - Mayor (2020–2026): Bruno Lorentz
- Area^{1}: 15.96 km^{2} (6.16 sq mi)
- Population (2023): 1,523
  - Density: 95.43/km^{2} (247.2/sq mi)
- Time zone: UTC+01:00 (CET)
  - Summer (DST): UTC+02:00 (CEST)
- INSEE/Postal code: 67004 /67310, 67440
- ^{1} French Land Register data, which excludes lakes, ponds, glaciers > 1 km^{2} (0.386 sq mi or 247 acres) and river estuaries.

Sommerau is a commune in the Bas-Rhin department of northeastern France. The municipality was established on 1 January 2016 and consists of the former communes of Allenwiller, Birkenwald, Salenthal and Singrist.

== See also ==
- Communes of the Bas-Rhin department
