= Château de Birkenwald =

Castle in France

Coordinates: 48.6586°N 7.3439°E

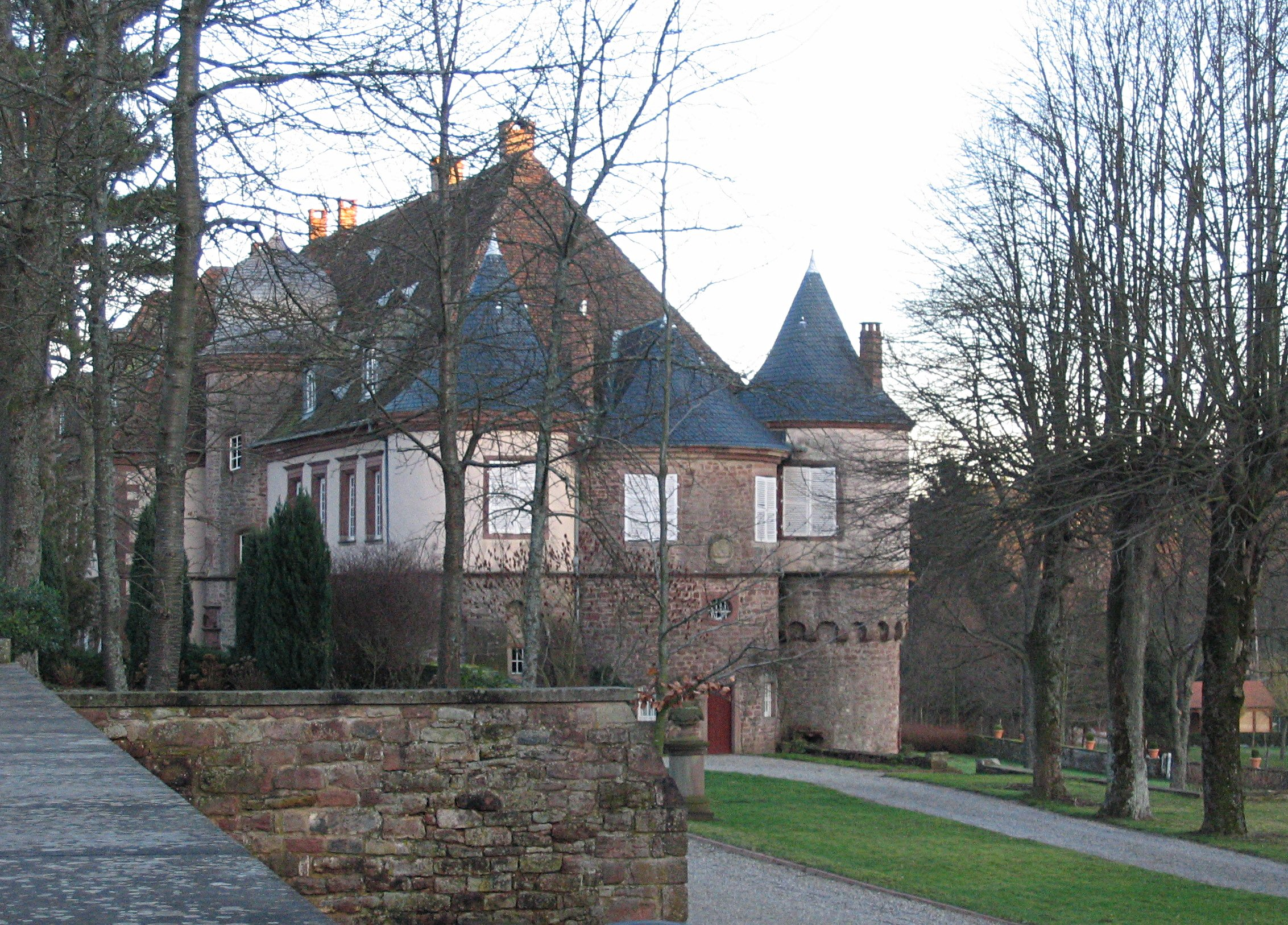
Château de Birkenwald

Château de Birkenwald is a château in Birkenwald, in the department of Bas-Rhin, France. Construction began in 1562 in the Renaissance style. It became a listed monument historique on 16 October 1930.
