= Singrist =

- Part of Sommerau
- Coat of arms
- Location of Singrist
- Location within France Location within Grand Est
- Coordinates: 48°40′12″N 7°23′12″E
- Country: France
- Region: Grand Est
- Department: Bas-Rhin
- Arrondissement: Saverne
- Canton: Saverne
- Commune: Sommerau
- Area^{1}: 3.54 km^{2} (1.37 sq mi)
- Highest elevation: 343 m (1,125 ft)
- Lowest elevation: 244 m (801 ft)
- Population (2022): 469
  - Density: 132/km^{2} (343/sq mi)
- Time zone: UTC+01:00 (CET)
  - Summer (DST): UTC+02:00 (CEST)
- Postal code: 67440
- ^{1} French Land Register data, which excludes lakes, ponds, glaciers > 1 km^{2} (0.386 sq mi or 247 acres) and river estuaries.

Singrist (French pronunciation: [siŋɡʁist]) is a former commune in the Bas-Rhin department in north-eastern France. On 1 January 2016, it was merged into the new commune Sommerau.

== See also ==
- Communes of the Bas-Rhin department
