= Oberhaslach =

- Commune
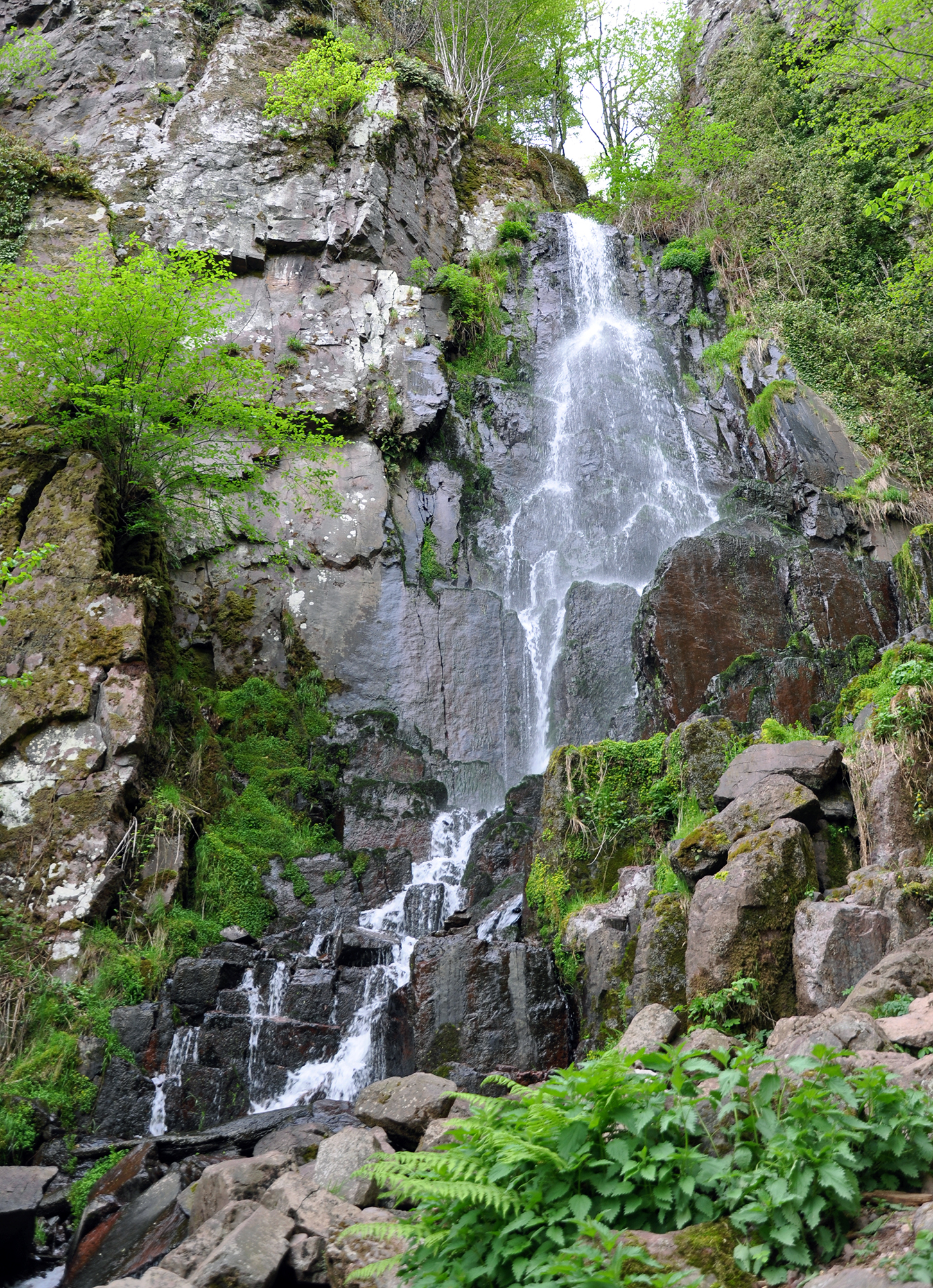
- The Nideck waterfall in Oberhaslach

- Coat of arms
- Location of Oberhaslach
- Location within France Location within Grand Est
- Coordinates: 48°33′N 7°20′E
- Country: France
- Region: Grand Est
- Department: Bas-Rhin
- Arrondissement: Molsheim
- Canton: Mutzig
- Intercommunality: Région de Molsheim-Mutzig

Government
  - Mayor (2020–2026): Jean Biehler
- Area^{1}: 25.22 km^{2} (9.74 sq mi)
- Highest elevation: 964 m (3,163 ft)
- Lowest elevation: 254 m (833 ft)
- Population (2023): 1,733
  - Density: 68.72/km^{2} (178.0/sq mi)
- Time zone: UTC+01:00 (CET)
  - Summer (DST): UTC+02:00 (CEST)
- INSEE/Postal code: 67342 /67280
- ^{1} French Land Register data, which excludes lakes, ponds, glaciers > 1 km^{2} (0.386 sq mi or 247 acres) and river estuaries.

Oberhaslach is a commune in the Bas-Rhin department in Grand Est in north-eastern France.

== Population ==
Historical population
Year	Pop.	±% p.a.
1968	1,022	—
1975	1,108	+1.16%
1982	1,145	+0.47%
1990	1,333	+1.92%
1999	1,505	+1.36%
2007	1,773	+2.07%
2012	1,773	+0.00%
2017	1,780	+0.08%
2023	1,733	−0.44%
Source: INSEE

== See also ==
- Niederhaslach, a neighbouring commune
- Communes of the Bas-Rhin department
