= Dimbsthal =

Dimbsthal Dímschtel
- Commune
- Coat of arms
- Location of Dimbsthal
- Location within France Location within Grand Est
- Coordinates: 48°40′21″N 7°21′31″E
- Country: France
- Region: Grand Est
- Department: Bas-Rhin
- Arrondissement: Saverne
- Canton: Saverne

Government
  - Mayor (2020–2026): Claude Schmitt
- Area^{1}: 1.91 km^{2} (0.74 sq mi)
- Highest elevation: 362 m (1,188 ft)
- Lowest elevation: 266 m (873 ft)
- Population (2023): 326
  - Density: 171/km^{2} (442/sq mi)
- Time zone: UTC+01:00 (CET)
  - Summer (DST): UTC+02:00 (CEST)
- INSEE/Postal code: 67096 /67440
- ^{1} French Land Register data, which excludes lakes, ponds, glaciers > 1 km^{2} (0.386 sq mi or 247 acres) and river estuaries.

Dimbsthal (French pronunciation: [dimstal]; German: Dimbstal) is a commune in the Bas-Rhin department in Grand Est in north-eastern France.

== History ==
The name of the commune is officially mentioned for the first time in 1120. At that time, it was ruled by the Marmoutier Abbey.

== Sport ==
The village hosted the Grand Est regional amateur cycling championships in 2018.

== Historical heritage and architecture ==
The church Saint-Symphorien is located in Dimbsthal.

The village also include an old water fountain. It was built in 1889 and is no longer in activity.

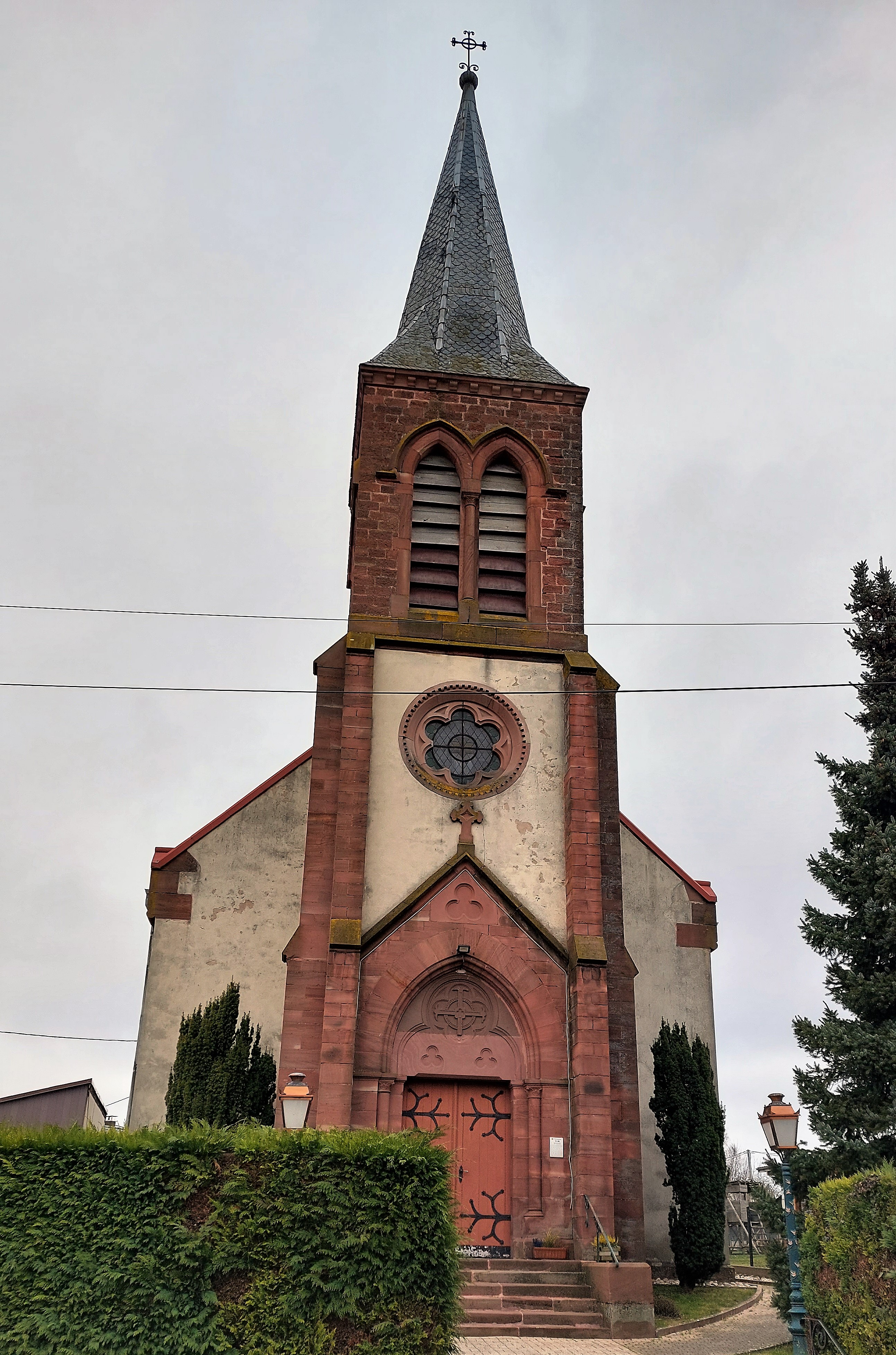
the church Sain-Symphorien

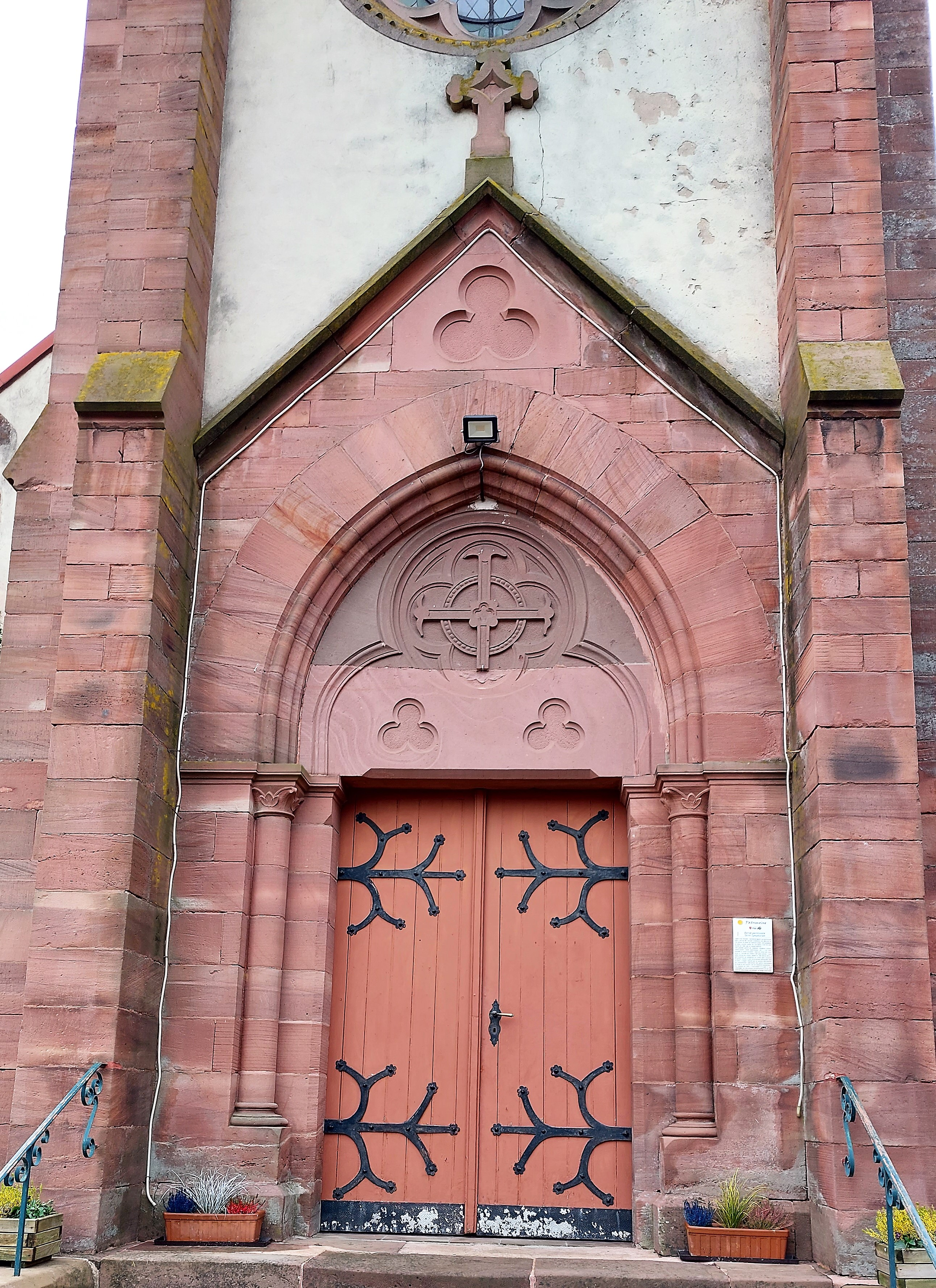
The entrance of the church

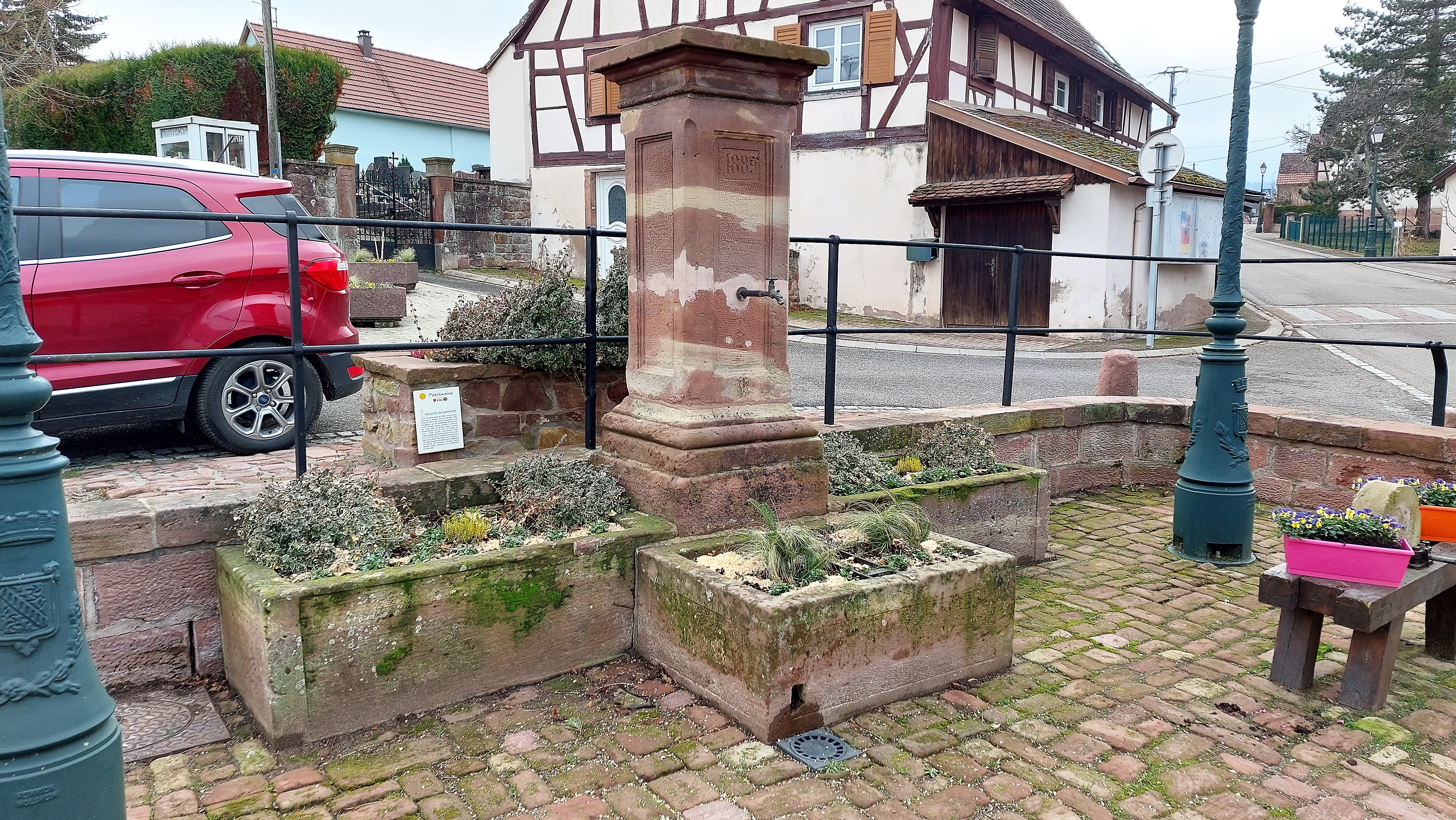
The old fountain

== See also ==
- Communes of the Bas-Rhin department
