= Salenthal =

- Part of Sommerau
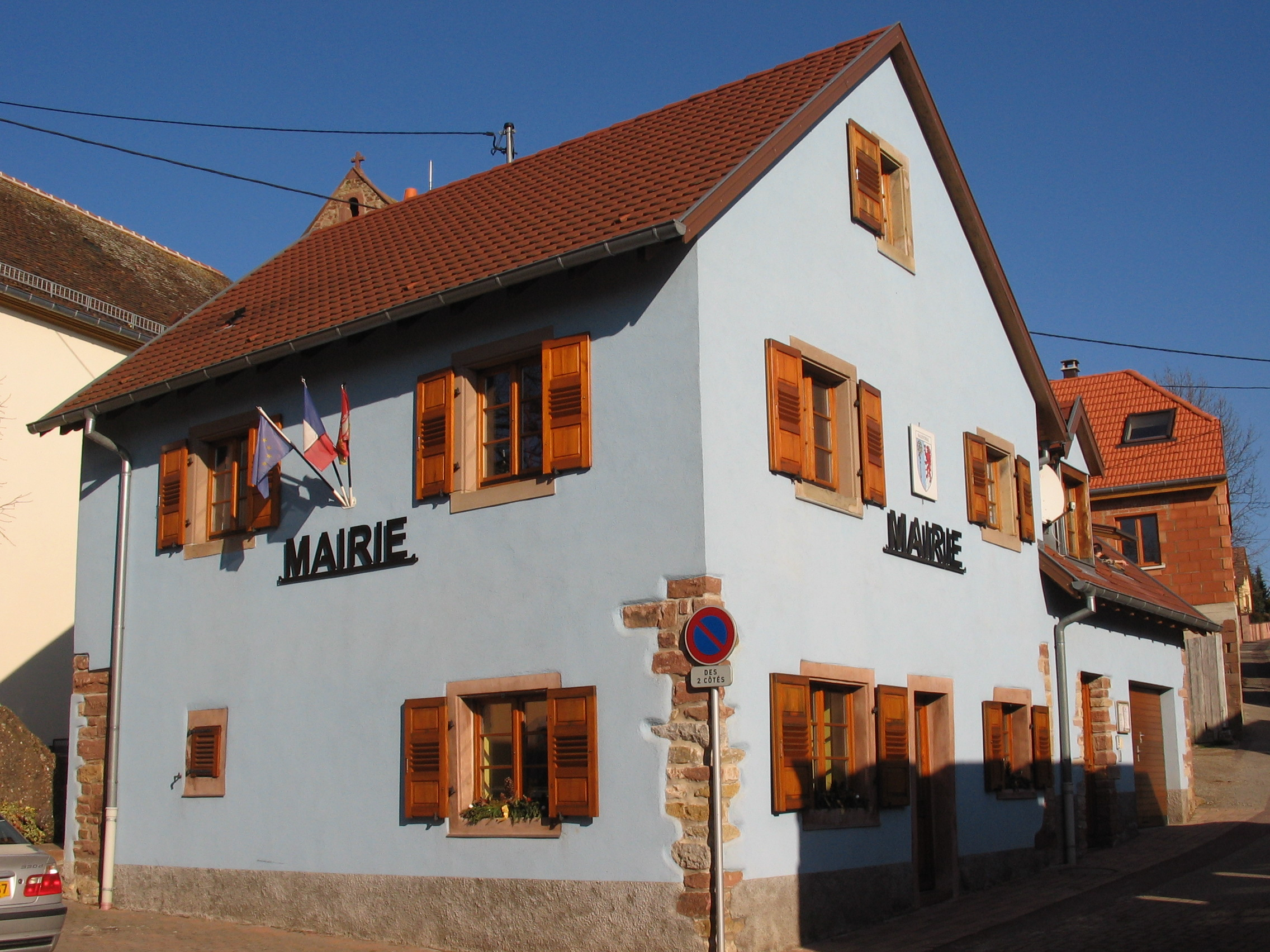
- Town hall

- Coat of arms
- Location of Salenthal
- Location within France Location within Grand Est
- Coordinates: 48°40′04″N 7°22′16″E
- Country: France
- Region: Grand Est
- Department: Bas-Rhin
- Arrondissement: Saverne
- Canton: Saverne
- Commune: Sommerau
- Area^{1}: 1.34 km^{2} (0.52 sq mi)
- Highest elevation: 313 m (1,027 ft)
- Lowest elevation: 265 m (869 ft)
- Population (2022): 208
  - Density: 155/km^{2} (402/sq mi)
- Time zone: UTC+01:00 (CET)
  - Summer (DST): UTC+02:00 (CEST)
- Postal code: 67440
- ^{1} French Land Register data, which excludes lakes, ponds, glaciers > 1 km^{2} (0.386 sq mi or 247 acres) and river estuaries.

Salenthal (French pronunciation: [saləntal]; German: Salental; Alsatian: Sàledàl) is a former commune in the Bas-Rhin department in north-eastern France. On 1 January 2016, it was merged into the new commune Sommerau.

== See also ==
- Communes of the Bas-Rhin department
