= Wangenbourg-Engenthal =

- Commune
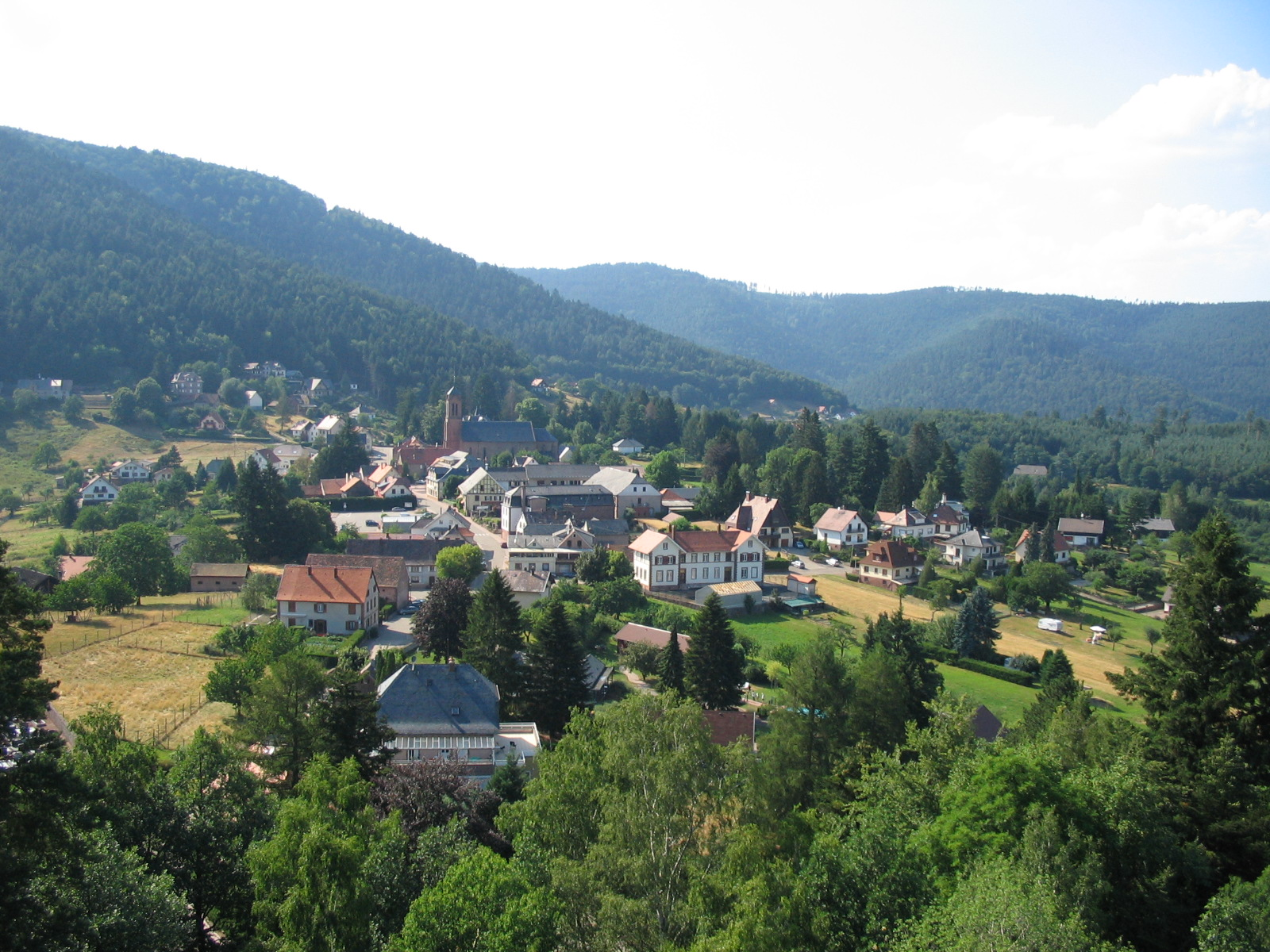
- A general view of Wangenbourg

- Coat of arms
- Location of Wangenbourg-Engenthal
- Location within France Location within Grand Est
- Coordinates: 48°38′N 7°18′E
- Country: France
- Region: Grand Est
- Department: Bas-Rhin
- Arrondissement: Molsheim
- Canton: Saverne
- Intercommunality: Mossig et Vignoble

Government
  - Mayor (2020–2026): Daniel Acker
- Area^{1}: 31.52 km^{2} (12.17 sq mi)
- Elevation: 420 m (1,380 ft)
- Highest elevation: 964 m (3,163 ft)
- Lowest elevation: 284 m (932 ft)
- Population (2023): 1,327
  - Density: 42.10/km^{2} (109.0/sq mi)
- Time zone: UTC+01:00 (CET)
  - Summer (DST): UTC+02:00 (CEST)
- INSEE/Postal code: 67122 /67710
- ^{1} French Land Register data, which excludes lakes, ponds, glaciers > 1 km^{2} (0.386 sq mi or 247 acres) and river estuaries.

Wangenbourg-Engenthal (French pronunciation: [vaŋɡənbuʁ ɛŋɡəntal]; German: Wangenburg-Engenthal, Alsatian: Wàngeburi-Angedààl) is a commune in the Bas-Rhin department in Grand Est in north-eastern France. The commune was established in November 1974 from the former communes Engenthal and Wangenbourg.

The commune is not a single settlement, but rather an administrative unit comprising the following eight mountain hamlets:

- Engenthal-le-Bas
- Engenthal-le-Haut
- Freudeneck
- les Huttes
- Obersteigen
- Schneethal
- Windsbourg
- Wolfsthal

== Population ==
Population data refer to the area corresponding with the commune as of January 2025.

Historical population
Year	Pop.	±% p.a.
1968	1,218	—
1975	1,244	+0.30%
1982	1,176	−0.80%
1990	1,159	−0.18%
1999	1,182	+0.22%
2007	1,366	+1.82%
2012	1,365	−0.01%
2017	1,354	−0.16%
2023	1,327	−0.34%
Source: INSEE

== Climate ==
On average, Wangenbourg-Engenthal experiences 71.3 days per year with a minimum temperature below 0 °C (32.0 °F), 3.1 days per year with a minimum temperature below −10 °C (14.0 °F), 22.2 days per year with a maximum temperature below 0 °C (32.0 °F), and 6.9 days per year with a maximum temperature above 30 °C (86.0 °F). The record high temperature was 37.4 °C (99.3 °F) on 26 June 2026, while the record low temperature was −16.9 °C (1.6 °F) on 7 February 2012.

Climate data for Wangenbourg-Engenthal (1991–2020 normals, extremes 1990–present)
Month	Jan	Feb	Mar	Apr	May	Jun	Jul	Aug	Sep	Oct	Nov	Dec	Year
Record high °C (°F)	16.8 (62.2)	19.1 (66.4)	23.8 (74.8)	27.5 (81.5)	31.2 (88.2)	37.4 (99.3)	37.2 (99.0)	36.3 (97.3)	31.1 (88.0)	27.2 (81.0)	22.6 (72.7)	17.7 (63.9)	37.4 (99.3)
Mean daily maximum °C (°F)	3.8 (38.8)	5.1 (41.2)	9.3 (48.7)	14.1 (57.4)	18.0 (64.4)	21.8 (71.2)	23.7 (74.7)	23.5 (74.3)	18.8 (65.8)	13.3 (55.9)	7.7 (45.9)	4.6 (40.3)	13.6 (56.5)
Daily mean °C (°F)	1.3 (34.3)	2.1 (35.8)	5.6 (42.1)	9.5 (49.1)	13.4 (56.1)	17.0 (62.6)	18.9 (66.0)	18.8 (65.8)	14.7 (58.5)	10.1 (50.2)	5.1 (41.2)	2.2 (36.0)	9.9 (49.8)
Mean daily minimum °C (°F)	−1.2 (29.8)	−0.8 (30.6)	1.9 (35.4)	4.9 (40.8)	8.8 (47.8)	12.1 (53.8)	14.2 (57.6)	14.1 (57.4)	10.5 (50.9)	6.8 (44.2)	2.6 (36.7)	−0.1 (31.8)	6.1 (43.1)
Record low °C (°F)	−14.5 (5.9)	−16.9 (1.6)	−14.4 (6.1)	−6.2 (20.8)	−0.1 (31.8)	3.8 (38.8)	7.1 (44.8)	5.2 (41.4)	2.8 (37.0)	−5.3 (22.5)	−11.4 (11.5)	−15.5 (4.1)	−16.9 (1.6)
Average precipitation mm (inches)	102.7 (4.04)	97.4 (3.83)	96.3 (3.79)	72.1 (2.84)	97.9 (3.85)	80.4 (3.17)	85.4 (3.36)	82.4 (3.24)	83.1 (3.27)	102.1 (4.02)	105.8 (4.17)	126.2 (4.97)	1,131.8 (44.55)
Average precipitation days (≥ 1.0 mm)	13.2	12.5	12.6	10.7	12.6	11.0	11.0	10.6	10.1	12.6	13.3	15.3	145.5
Source: Meteociel

== See also ==
- Communes of the Bas-Rhin department
