= Canton of Benfeld =

Coordinates: 48°20′58″N 7°36′53″E

Benfeld
- Former canton
- Interactive map of Benfeld
- Country: France
- Region: Grand Est
- Department: Bas-Rhin
- No. of communes: {{{nbcomm}}}
- Disbanded: 2015
- Population (2012): 20,928

The canton of Benfeld is a former canton of France, located in the Bas-Rhin department, in the Alsace region. It had 20,928 inhabitants (2012). It was disbanded following the French canton reorganisation which came into effect in March 2015. It consisted of 13 communes, which joined the canton of Erstein in 2015.

== Communes ==
The communes of the canton of Benfeld were:

1. Benfeld
2. Boofzheim
3. Friesenheim
4. Herbsheim
5. Huttenheim
6. Kertzfeld
7. Kogenheim
8. Matzenheim
9. Rhinau
10. Rossfeld
11. Sand
12. Sermersheim
13. Witternheim

== See also ==
- Cantons of the Bas-Rhin department
