= Operation Solstice (Alsace) =

- Part of the Western Front of World War II
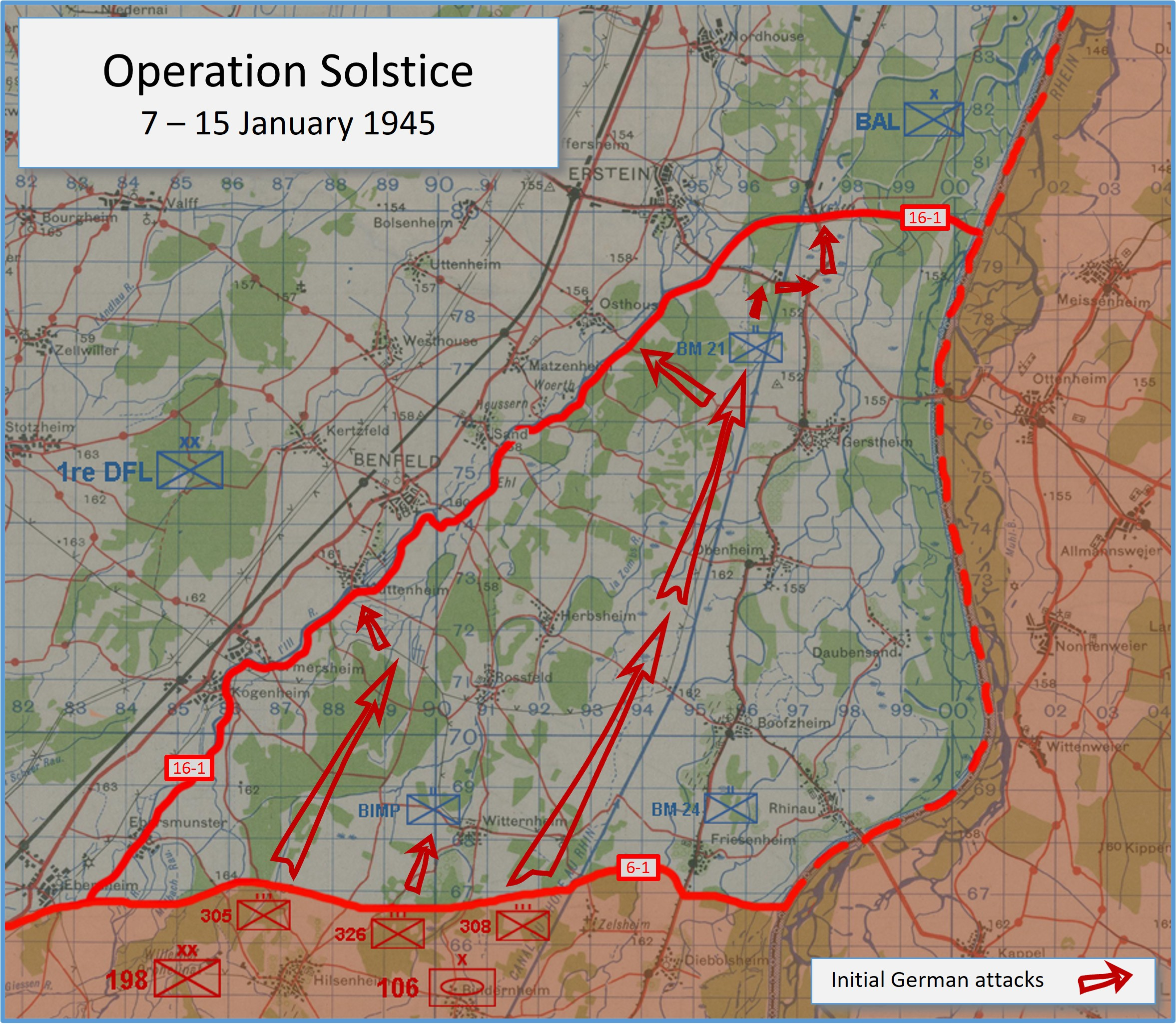
- Map of the operation
| Date | 7–15 January 1945 |
| Location | Alsace, France |
| Result | German victory |

Belligerents
| Germany | France |

Commanders and leaders
| (Nazi Germany) Hellmuth Thumm | (Provisional Government of the French Republic) Pierre Garbay |

Units involved
| Germany: 64th Army Corps | (Provisional Government of the French Republic): 1st Free French Division |

Casualties and losses
| 115 killed 391 wounded 155 missing | 109 killed 411 wounded 924 missing, plus 40 men other losses |

Operation Solstice (German: Unternehmen Sonnenwende) was a German offensive operation in January 1945 and formed part of Operation Nordwind. The strategic objective of Operation Solstice was an area shaped like a triangle between the rivers Ill and Rhine near the towns of Erstein and Sélestat. The area around Erstein was to serve as a springboard for an advance to Molsheim, which was located about 15 kilometers further north, in the event of an encirclement of Strasbourg. The attack was to be launched from the northernmost point of the Colmar Pocket by a German infantry division reinforced with an Panzer brigade. In the early days, German troops made rapid progress and even surrounded and destroyed a French battalion. However, the French troops in this area managed to prevent the Germans from crossing the Ill, and as a result, the offensive quickly came to a halt. The push toward Molsheim was no longer considered.

== Introduction ==
Shortly after the start of the Battle of the Bulge, the American 3rd Army focused entirely on the Ardennes. The American 7th Army then took over part of the front line from the 3rd Army. Subsequently, the French 1st Army had to stretch its front line in Alsace. Meanwhile, the Germans planned a new offensive, Operation Nordwind, in Alsace-Lorraine.

== German plan ==
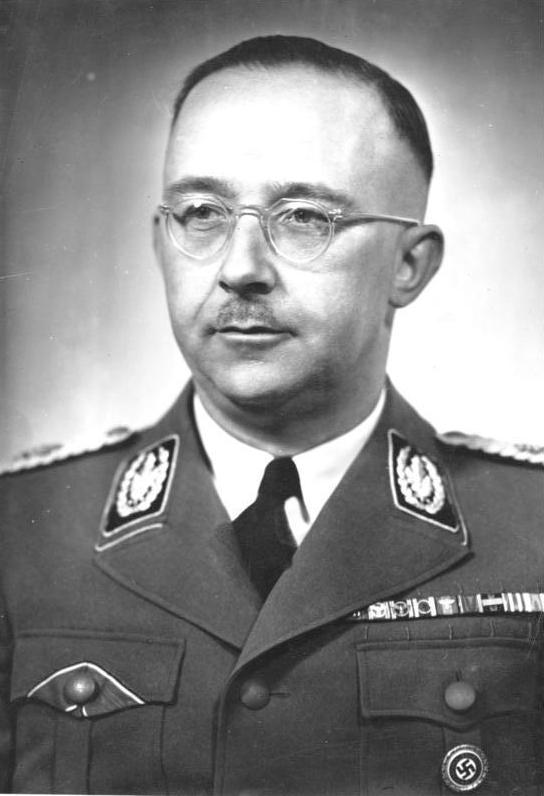
Reichsführer-SS Heinrich Himmler (hier in 1942)

The plan for Operation Nordwind, developed at the end of December 1944, had its main axis of attack in the northern Vosges and was to be carried out by the German 1st Army. This attack would begin on December 31, 1944. Additionally, the 19th Army would also carry out two attacks on either side of Strasbourg. One was a crossing of the Rhine at Gambsheim, which ultimately began on January 5, 1945. The other was from the Colmar Pocket to the north, starting on January 7, 1945.

The latter attack was originally just a secondary attack with “battalion-sized assaults.” In the first days of January 1945, the staff of the 64th Army Corps was ordered to prepare an attack from the line Diebolsheim–Hilsenheim to the north. The preliminary goal was the river Ill, and to capture a sector from Erstein to Sélestat (German: Schlettstadt). Two days before the scheduled start date of January 7, the 198th Infantry Division would conduct a small raid on Neunkirch, with the goal of taking prisoners and gathering intelligence. The corps' plan, approved by higher command, envisioned an attack along the western side of the Rhône–Rhine Canal.

== Units involved ==
=== Wehrmacht ===
The overall command of this operation lay with Army Group Upper Rhine under Reichsführer-SS Heinrich Himmler. The operation was executed by the 19th Army under the command of General der Infanterie Siegfried Rasp. Rasp appointed the 64th Army Corps under General der Infanterie Hellmuth Thumm to carry out the attack. The main attack was to be carried out by the 198th Infantry Division under Generalmajor Otto Schiel. This division consisted of three regiments: the 305th Grenadier Regiment, the 308th Grenadier Regiment, and the 326th Grenadier Regiment, and had a combat strength of 2,692 men. A relatively strong armored force was also assembled, consisting of:

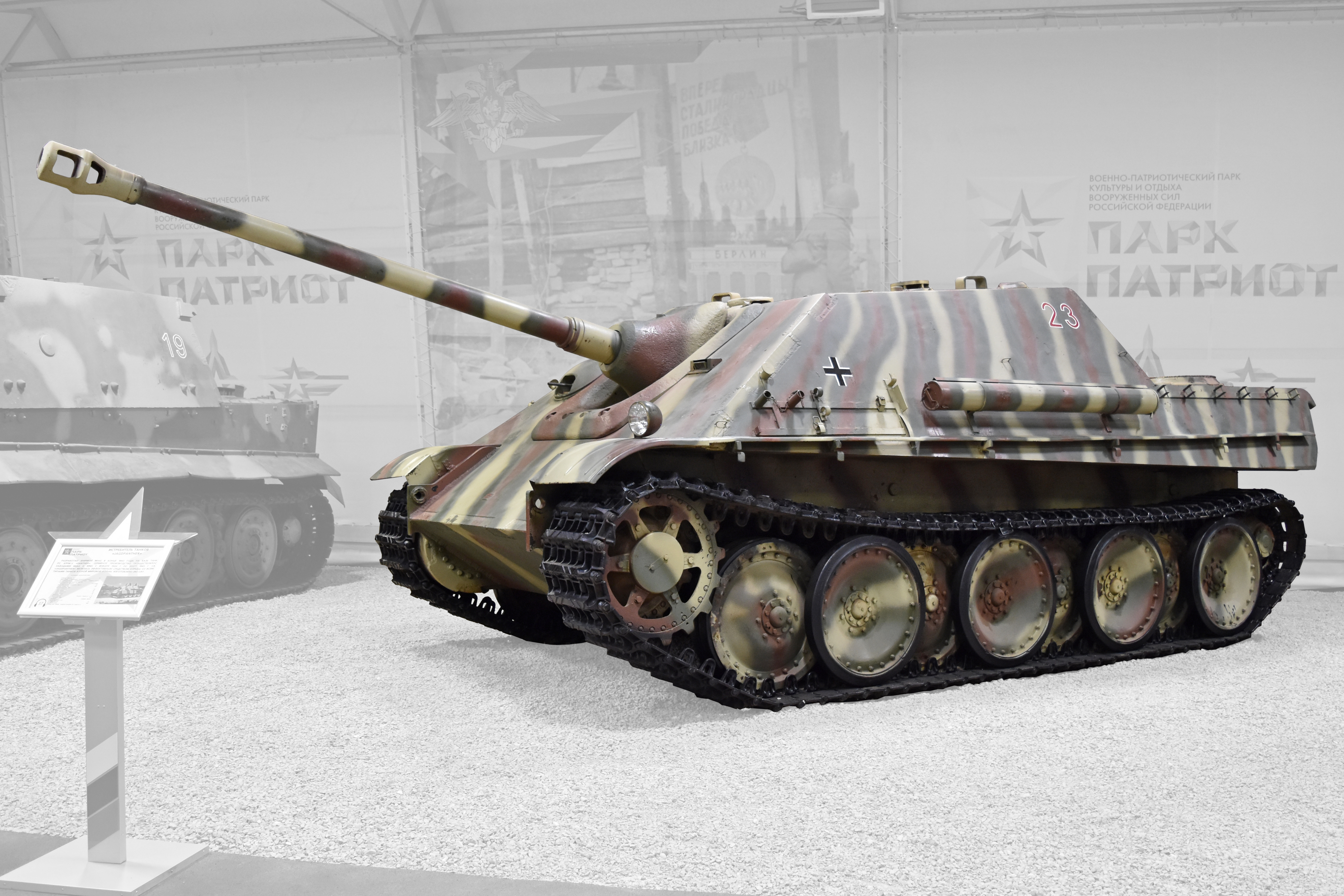
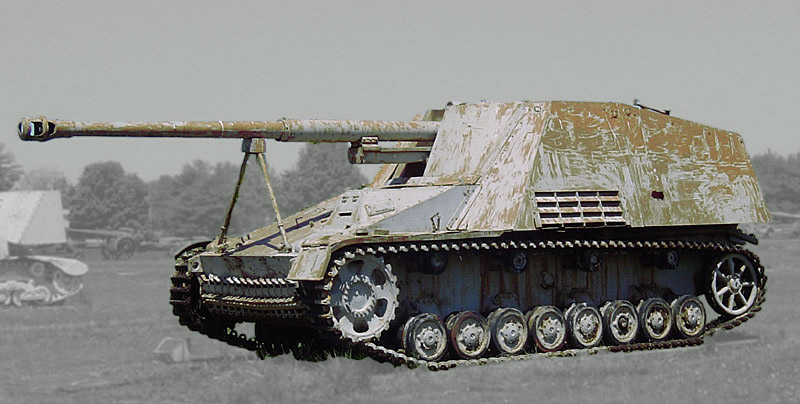
The main German tank destroyers in this offensive:
the Jagdpanther (left) and the Nashorn (right)
- 106th Panzer Brigade “Feldherrnhalle”, under Oberst Franz Bäke (replaced by Major Bernhard von Schkopp from January 12, 1945). This brigade had (operational) 1 Panzer IV, 3 Panthers, 1 Jagdpanzer IV, and 3 Flakpanzers.
- Kampfgruppe Noak, under Major Karl-Heinz Noak. This Kampfgruppe consisted of about half of the schwere Panzerjäger-Abteilung 654, formed from Kampfgruppen Schnepf and Heyn with a total of 20 Jagdpanthers. Also attached were 2 tank destroyer companies, the 1st Company of Heeres-Panzerjäger-Abteilung 93 and the 1st Company of Heeres-Panzerjäger-Abteilung 525, totaling 22 Nashorns. During the operation, the armored elements of the 106th Panzer Brigade were subordinated to Noak.
- Heeres-Sturmgeschütz-Brigade 280, under Major Kurt Kühme. The brigade had 12 StuG III and StuH 42 assault guns.

As reinforcement, Thumm also had the 269th Infantry Division (Generalleutnant Hans Wagner) in reserve. Parts of this division were deployed after a few days, but the entire division was transported to the Eastern Front in mid-January and was thus no longer available. Additionally, the Divisions-Füsilier-Battalion 708 of the 708th Volksgrenadier Division was available.

=== Allies ===
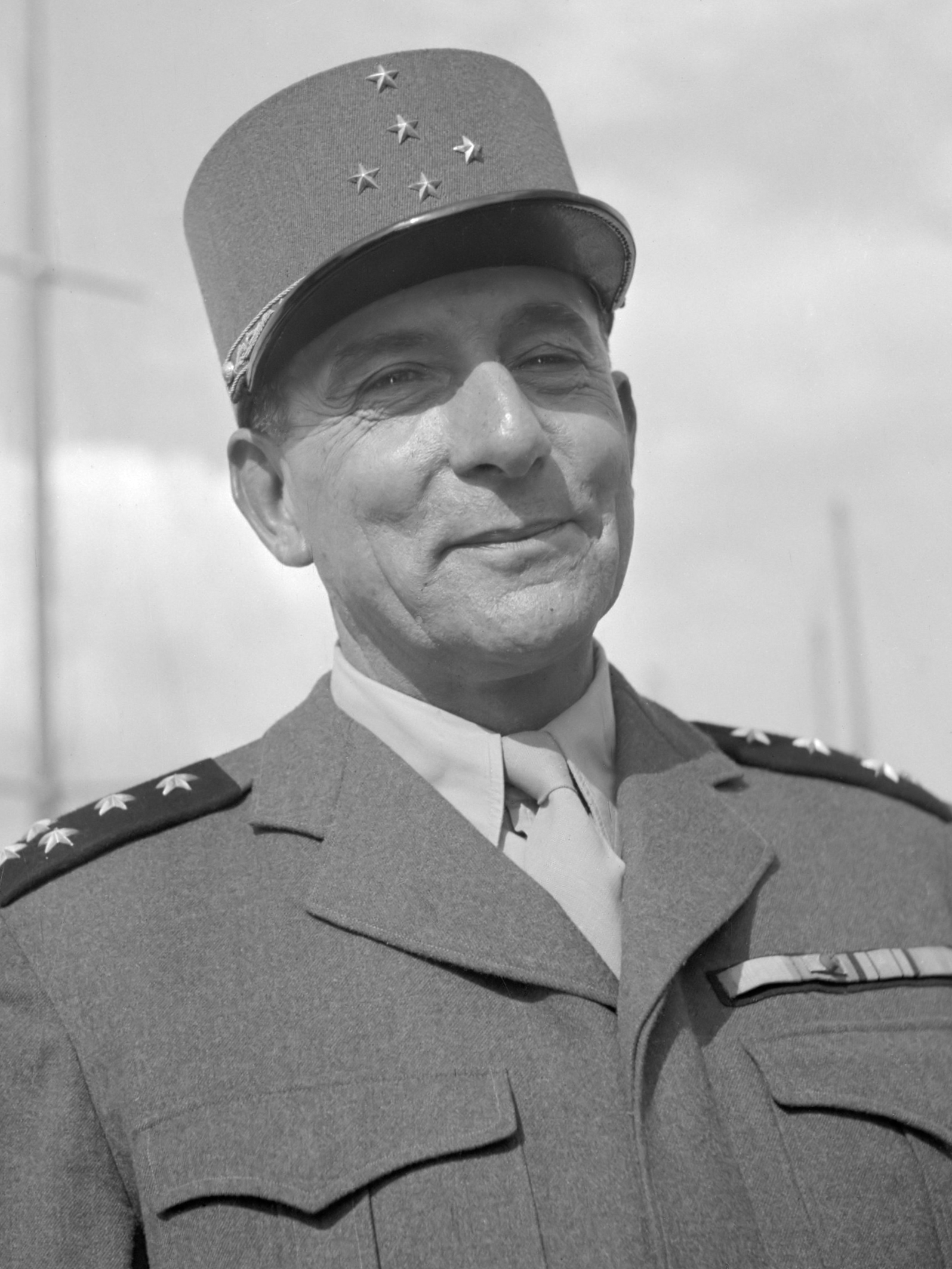
Général Jean de Lattre de Tassigny (here in 1946)

The defence of the Rhine sector and the Colmar Pocket was the responsibility of the 1st French Army under "Général d'armée" Jean de Lattre de Tassigny. The northern sector of the Colmar Pocket was defended by the French 2nd Army Corps, and the relevant sector was held by the 1st Free French Division (Fr: 1re DFL) under "Général de brigade" Pierre Garbay. This division had only taken over the sector on December 31, 1944, after having served on the Atlantic Coast. In the immediate direction of the attack was the 4th Brigade (under Colonel Raynal). This consisted of: • Bataillon de marche no. 21 (abbreviated BM 21, under Captaine Fournier) • Bataillon de marche no. 24 (abbreviated BM 24, under Commandant Pierre Coffinier) • Bataillon d'infanterie de marine et du Pacifique (abbreviated BIMP, under Commandant Edmond Magendie) Parts of the rest of the division were deployed in the following days for support. Also involved were elements of the Alsace-Lorraine Independent Brigade (under Colonel André Malraux).

=== Condition of troops ===
Both the French and German troops involved in the fighting were not in optimal condition. The 1st Free French Division had lost much of its experienced personnel in late autumn 1944. Around 6,000 experienced Senegalese (colonial) troops were replaced by inexperienced members of the Forces françaises de l'intérieur (FFI). This replacement of what were then called "blacks" with white men is known in France as “Blanchiment des troupes coloniales” (freely translated: the "whitening" of colonial troops). As a result, the division's combat strength was greatly reduced and was certainly not at its previous level by early January.

The Germans were in a similar position. The 198th Infantry Division had suffered heavy losses during its retreat from Provence. These were replenished in autumn 1944 with two grenadier battalions, a fortress infantry battalion, a fortress MG battalion, a naval training unit, remnants of two other battalions, parts of a security regiment, parts of a naval artillery unit, etc. —in short, a motley collection of various troops from various origins. The 106th Panzer Brigade initially had 2 Panzer IVs and 12 Panthers, of which only 1 and 3 respectively were operational. Note that a full Panzer brigade should have had 36 Panthers and 11 Jagdpanzer IVs. However, the brigade had 80% of its personnel (including the panzer grenadiers). Heeres-Sturmgeschütz-Brigade 280 likewise had only about a quarter of its organic assault guns.

Insignia of the most important units:

198th Infantry Division

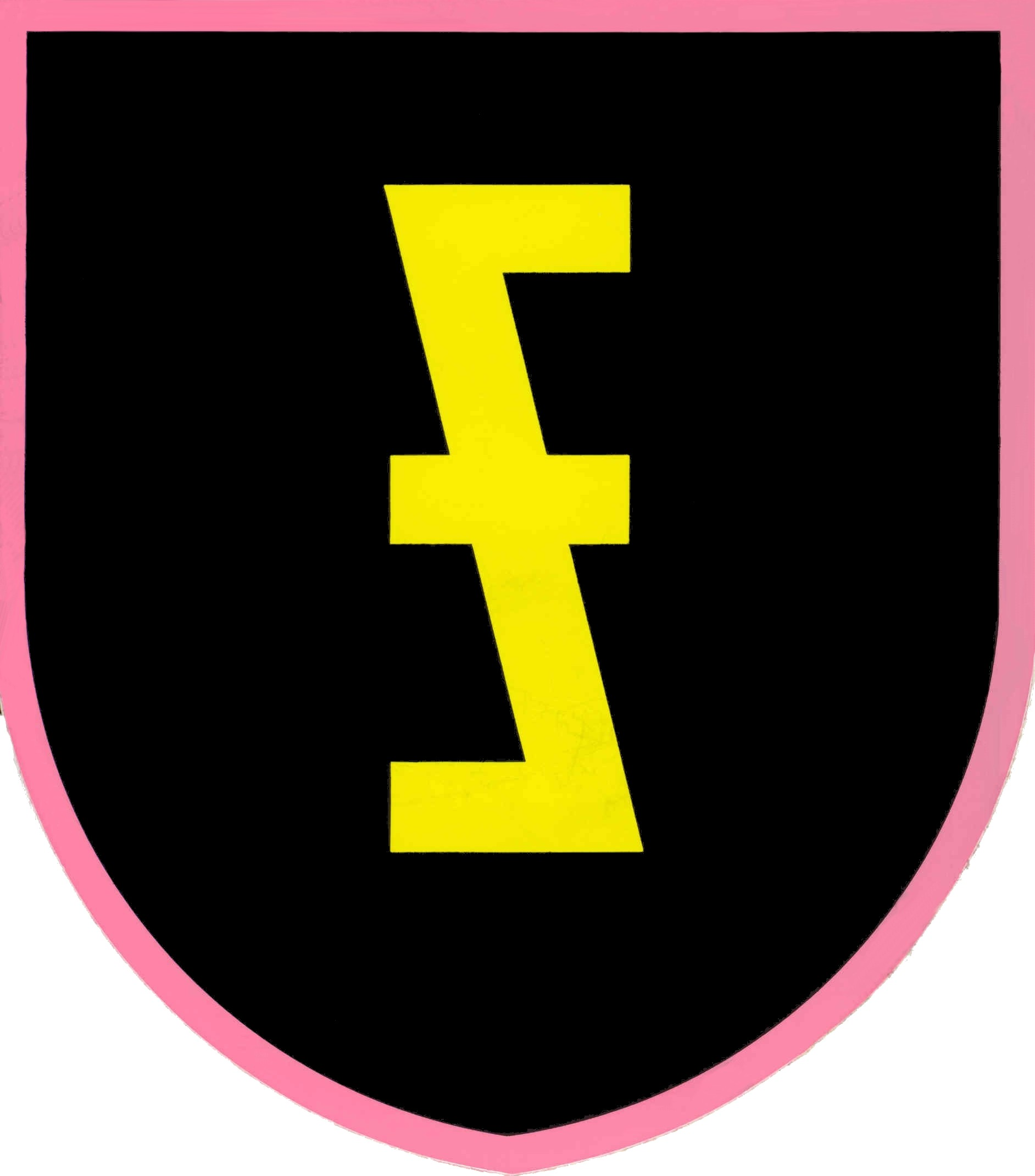
106th Panzer Brigade

4th Free French Brigade

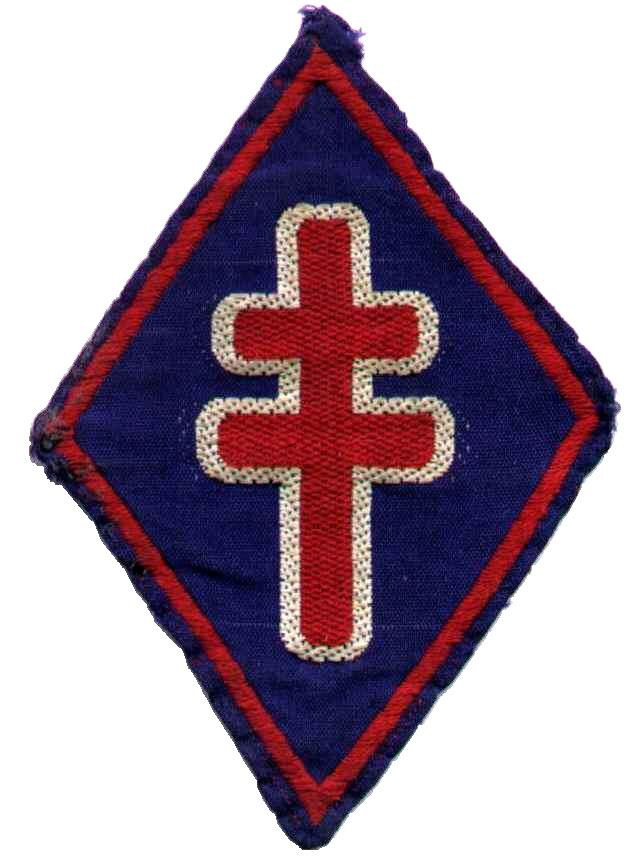
1st Free French Division

== Course of battle ==
=== Day 1: 7 January 1945 ===
The attack began as planned. The 305th GR, operating on the left, advanced through the forest of Sermersheim at 05:00, but due to a blown-up bridge near Riedhof and French resistance from outposts of the 11th Cuirassier Regiment (Fr: 11e Régiment de Cuirassiers), the regiment only reached the northern and western edges of the forest of Sermersheim and the Riedwald by evening. The group on the right (308th and 326th GR) captured Neunkirch around 08:50, marking the breakthrough. Now "Kampfgruppe Noak" could break out, the Zembs was crossed, and around 10:30 the first armored vehicles appeared in front of Osthouse; around noon tanks appeared south of Erstein, fired, and then disappeared again. At 13:00, the canal bridge south of Krafft was captured. Later in the afternoon, an attack toward Krafft followed, but due to anti-tank fire, one Jagdpanther was destroyed and another damaged. A company of BM 21 managed to blow up the bridge over the drainage canal of the Ill. Subsequent attacks were cancelled, and the Germans switched to defence in this area.

Following the tanks, infantry advanced and captured Witternheim around 10:30, then launched an attack on Herbsheim from the southeast around 11:00. This attack was repelled by French units, as was a second attack at 16:30. A night-time attack was also repelled with the help of three light tanks from the 1st RFM (Fr: 1er Régiment de Fusiliers Marins).

During the day, in the area between the Rhône–Rhine Canal and the Rhine, only skirmishes occurred with German troops occupying Rhinau and Friesenheim; the French had retreated to Boofzheim. For BM 24, the situation seemed calm until early afternoon, when two German armored vehicles (the previously mentioned Jagdpanthers?) were reported northwest of Gerstheim. BM 24 was ordered to stay in place as a counterattack was being prepared via the roads Osthouse–Gerstheim and Sand–Obenheim. These actions were in fact only reconnaissance missions, but the Germans became alert and delayed their northward push, focusing more on Sand and Benfeld. By the end of the day, the 1re DFL began reinforcing the sector with whatever was available. The remnants of Combat Command 5 of the 5th French Armored Division were assigned to the sector, and BM 11 (2nd Brigade) was rapidly relieved by American troops. That same evening, Himmler gave the order to strengthen the attacks toward Benfeld and then advance northwest toward Molsheim.

=== Day 2: 8 January 1945 ===
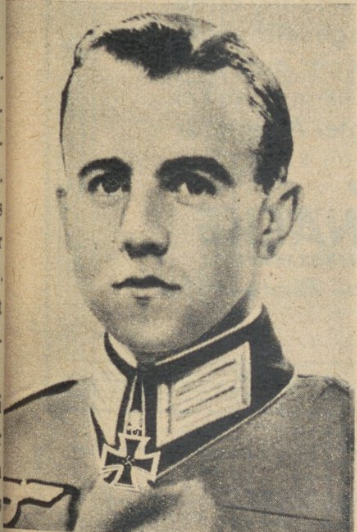
Karl-Heinz Noak, here as Oberleutnant in 1942

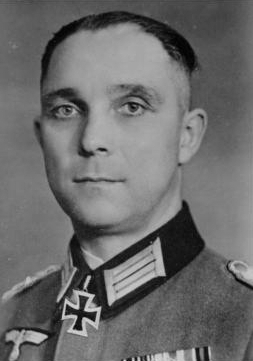
Franz Bäke, here als Major in February 1944

Despite their efforts, the Germans made only limited progress, while French troops launched their first serious counterattacks. After spending the night at Krafft, "Kampfgruppe Noak" slowly advanced along the Sand–Obenheim road, but by evening GR 326, despite tank support, could advance no further than the Pfifferwald; in fact, they encountered French attempts to re-establish contact with BM 24 along this axis. At 09:00, a French detachment encountered German tanks and had to retreat, and at 14:15 an action by elements of BM 11 had the same result. Further north, the Germans attempted attacks on the Osthouse bridge at 07:30, 11:00, and 12:30, all of which failed. A French attempt at 10:15 on the Osthouse–Gerstheim road also failed. In the afternoon, the same unit, now reinforced by BM 11, moved to the eastern edge of the Osthouse Forest before receiving the order to withdraw. French offensives also failed in the evening.

The connection with BM 24 could not be reestablished, but the German advance toward Sand also temporarily came to a halt. German leadership was dissatisfied with the aggressiveness of the German armored troops and Major Noak was replaced by Oberst Franz Bäke.

All day, Rossfeld and Herbsheim were bombed, and to the west the Germans expanded their hold on the forests. East of the canal, Daubensand was lost, and a German battalion crossed the Rhine near Gerstheim. The commander of BM 24 then considered a withdrawal to the north. At 20:00, he received permission to reach Gerstheim after having recalled the French troops from Boofzheim. However, during the night BM 24 was ordered to remain in Obenheim.

=== Day 3: 9 January 1945 ===
This was a crucial day. The link between the Pfifferwald (GR 326) and Hirtzwald groups was severed, cutting off all communication with the garrisons of Rossfeld and Herbsheim. The "Kampfgruppe Noak" advanced to the Ill river south of Heussern. It was against this advance that new attempts to liberate BM 24 would collide. A mixed group (BM 11 - CC 5) attacked around 9:30 a.m. on the Sand-Obenheim axis and by 3:00 p.m. had reached the eastern edge of the Pfifferwald. Around 5:00 p.m., about twenty German tanks appeared in front of Ehl, without infantry, creating a dual threat: a possible crossing of the Ill or an attack? The French group withdrew.

German intentions concerning BM 24 were becoming increasingly clear. The attack was launched on Obenheim. Preceded by heavy artillery shelling, around 3:30 p.m. the 1./308 approached the northern outskirts of Gerstheim, launched an attack with two companies and three Jagdpanthers, and encircled the village. The French garrison (about 100 men from the Alsace-Lorraine Independent Brigade) then withdrew to the north. This left BM 24 alone, and to avoid its destruction, a withdrawal would have to be ordered without delay. But the French high command, up to "Général" de Lattre, continued debating whether to keep the battalion there, and even spoke of carrying out reconnaissance and attacks on the eastern bank of the Rhine. But while the French command was active on an abstract level, the general staff of the 19th Army began to worry due to a local action; elements of the 1st and 3rd squadrons of the 1st RFM moved from Benfeld to Herbsheim in the afternoon, broke through the defensive line, made contact with the Obenheim garrison, delivered food and ammunition, took the wounded, and returned to their starting point. At the same time, the commander of the 1re DFL was plagued by new concerns: the BIMP was exhausted. As there was no talk of evacuating Rossfeld and Herbsheim, reinforcements or relief were to be provided by 10 January, but fortunately, the 1st BLE (Foreign Legion Brigade = Fr: Brigade de Légion Étrangère) had just been relieved by the Americans.

=== Day 4: 10 January 1945 ===
==== Fate of Obenheim garrison ====
From 7:30 a.m. German artillery increased its fire; at 9 a.m. leaflets were dropped and around 10:00 a.m. two parliamentarians were sent back. Around 2:00 p.m., Marauders dropped 72 containers, many of which were lost. The intervention of aircraft from the 1st French Air Corps and the XII TAC provided temporary relief. The German attack on the town was planned from four directions: from the north with 1./308 (Oblt. Heinrich Meschede) and six Jagdpanthers (KG Heyn), from the northeast, southeast, and south with three companies (4./5./6.) of Panzergrenadier Battalion 2106, Panzer-KG at Heesen (106), SPW-Battalion Bennwitz (106), Panzer KG Kühme (StugBrig 280), and KG von Brunn (198th ID). At the last moment, an SS battalion and two assault guns reinforced the southern attack (the SS troops came from SS–Regiment Radolfzell). The attack began at 10 a.m. but was limited. The threat materialized in the north, where German infantry, supported by tanks, after destroying two 57 mm M1 anti-tank guns, managed to infiltrate the village. Around 7:30 p.m., the commander of the 64th Army Corps arrived on site and the attack resumed. A penetration was made in the southern defences, causing the defensive perimeter to shrink more and more. After the destruction of documents and equipment, a ceasefire order was given by 9:30 p.m. The Germans counted 569 prisoners, including 17 officers, 80 wounded, and 20 dead. Two officers and a liaison officer managed to escape, five soldiers hid in the ruins. BM 24 had thus ceased to exist. The dismay among the French was immense.

==== Replacement of garrisons of Herbsheim and Rossfeld ====
After a bombing of the German positions by 13 French aircraft, a French detachment (armored vehicles of CC 5 under "Commandant" de Mosier and a parachute battalion (II/1st Parachute Regiment)) departed at 4:00 p.m., drove the enemy back, and opened the road, so that by 5:30 p.m. the Germans were expelled and the 1st BLE was able to reach both locations. At 8:00 p.m., the first elements were ready and the BIMP carried out the reverse movement. By 5:00 a.m., everything was over, with only German artillery having intervened. The French success was evident: besides the successful replacement of the two garrisons, the German units had suffered heavy losses (139 dead and missing).

=== Day 5: 11 January 1945 ===
After Himmler criticized the execution of operations by the 64th Army Corps and the 198th Infantry Division, he demanded that "General" Rasp take direct command from a forward headquarters. His task was made easier by the deployment of a significant portion of the 269th Infantry Division (469th Grenadier Regiment, all artillery, various units) and by shelling Benfeld from artillery positions east of the Rhine. Events then went much more favorably for the Germans. The gap in the front southeast of Benfeld was sealed, the connection around the two strongpoints was reinforced, and the advanced line was consolidated near the eastern bank of the Ill. Units of the 269th Infantry Division took over the southern and southeastern part of the sector. This freed elements of the "Kampfgruppe Noak", who executed a thrust toward Ziegelscheuer, crossed the Lutter, and were only stopped by the destroyed bridge over the Ill; Benfeld was just 500 m away.

During the night of 11 to 12 January, the garrisons of the 1st BLE and BM 11 in Herbsheim and Rossfeld were finally evacuated. After disabling heavy equipment, the French troops infiltrated back to their lines at the Ill and were safe again by 6:00 a.m.

=== Day 6: 12 January 1945 ===
Ultimately, on this day the Germans succeeded in marking out the Ill on its eastern bank, in the area indicated in the original plan. On the sixth day of the battle, the objective was achieved; but the destruction of enemy troops between the Rhine and the Ill had not been completed, and no bridgehead could be established. Herbsheim was taken at 8:30 a.m. and Rossfeld at 11:15 a.m. The survivors of the 1st BLE strengthened the defence around Benfeld, while the Germans were active in the north: occupation of the southern part of Krafft and attacks at 3:00 a.m. and 6:30 a.m. at the Osthouse bridge. This bridge had been destroyed at 1:00 a.m. as a precaution by order of the commander. By the end of the day, the 1re DFL was fully regrouped in a defensive position behind the Ill, in a position it had hoped to occupy six days earlier with intact units.

=== Day 7: 13 January 1945 ===
After the staff of the 19th Army attempted to reinforce its line of resistance through a number of targeted aggressive actions, it had to abandon any offensive of significant scale by the end of the afternoon. Rasp was ordered to prepare the 269th Infantry Division for transfer outside the army sector. This division had to be urgently redeployed to the Eastern Front. As compensation, an alarm battalion from Colmar and two border guard battalions from Germany arrived. Temporarily, the noise of tanks and the withdrawal of the 269th Infantry Division gave the French the impression that an attack was imminent.

=== Days 8–10: 14–16 January 1945 ===
The 198th Infantry Division was once again given responsibility for the northern and northwestern fronts of the Colmar Pocket. But although it received some infantry reinforcements, nearly all armored support was withdrawn and sent north of Freiburg on the 16th. On 15 January, the first elements of the 269th Infantry Division departed for Silesia. After the final failure at the Huttenheim pedestrian bridge on the 14th, German forces would henceforth limit themselves to defending and further establishing the Ill line and conducting reconnaissance activities. On the French side, a reduction and then an end to enemy aggression was noted, but this did not prevent them from continuing all possible defensive measures.

== Assessment ==
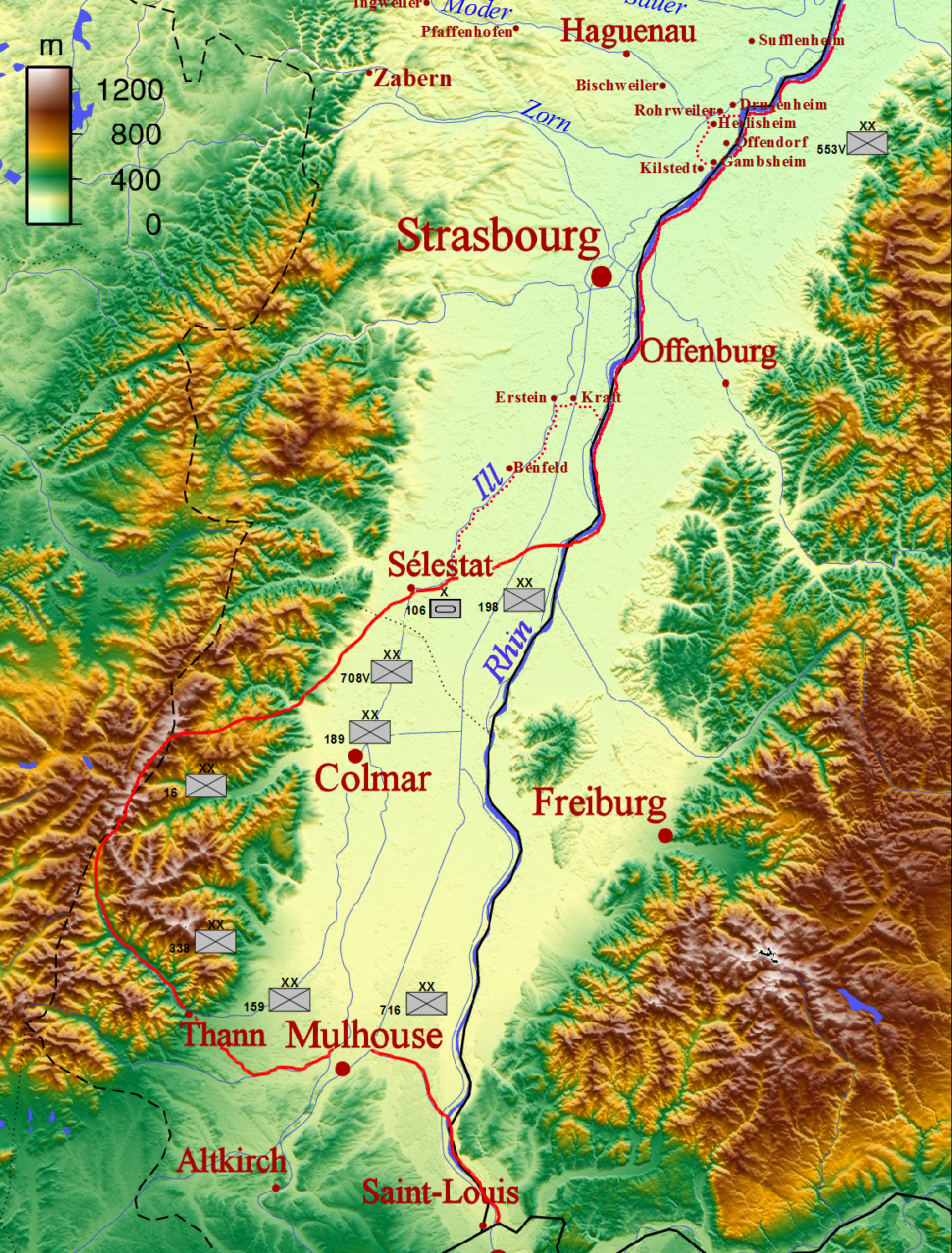
Operation Solstice at the northern edge of the Colmar-pocket (red dotted line)

Viewed as part of the offensive project Operation Nordwind, Operation Solstice did not achieve its objectives, as it did not endanger Allied forces or Strasbourg, and no irreparable losses were inflicted. However, the set goal—to march to the Ill line and destroy enemy forces—was achieved with the following limitations: no bridgehead was formed, and part of the encircled forces managed to escape. These successes also came at the cost of straining troop resources and extending the frontline.

French troops contributed to the defense. Some small French units, during the first day of the operation, took successful initiatives to restore the defensive line and managed to maintain cohesion within their encircled formations. The German military leadership credited the French units for this, saying "The reinforcements consist of fairly young classes; their short training is partly compensated by a corps of valuable officers and officers accustomed to combat. The elements that were encircled between 7 and 12 January fought well."

=== Weather ===
The winter of 1944/1945 in this region was harsh. Nighttime frost during this January 1945 period reached as low as -20 °C. The snow layer was locally up to a meter deep. There was also frequent (thick) fog. Due to this typical winter weather, the normally very strong influence of Allied air forces was reduced to a minimum. This played into the hands of the Germans.

== Casualties ==
On a human level, both sides suffered heavy losses in relation to the deployed troops. On the French side: for the 1re DFL from 3 to 17 January, there were 99 dead, 389 wounded, and 906 missing (most of the missing were of course from BM 24); furthermore, the Alsace-Lorraine Independent Brigade suffered around 40 casualties, CC 5 had 8 dead, 20 wounded, and 12 missing, and the régiment d’artillerie coloniale d’AOF (RACAOF) had 2 dead, 3 wounded, and 6 missing.

For the various German units, the following numbers were recorded from 7 to 12 January: 115 killed, 391 wounded, 155 missing, distributed as follows:

| Unit | Killed | | | Wounded | | | Missing | | |
| Unit | Officers | NCO's | Men | Officers | NCO's | Men | Officers | NCO's | Men |
|---|---|---|---|---|---|---|---|---|---|
| 198th ID | 3 | 19 | 55 | 10 | 34 | 228 | 5 | 17 | 95 |
| PzBrigade 106 | 1 | 4 | 4 | 2 | 4 | 38 | 0 | 3 | 15 |
| Füs. Btl 708 | 1 | 1 | 9 | 0 | 6 | 21 | 0 | 3 | 17 |
| StuGeschBrig 280 | 1 | 0 | 2 | 0 | 4 | 5 | 0 | 0 | 0 |
| sPzJgAbt 654 | 0 | 0 | 5 | 2 | 2 | 7 | 0 | 0 | 0 |
| Nashorn-Kp 525 | 0 | 0 | 0 | 0 | 0 | 0 | 0 | 0 | 0 |
| Nashorn-Kp 93 | 0 | 0 | 0 | 1 | 3 | 10 | 0 | 0 | 0 |
| Total | 6 | 24 | 75 | 16 | 56 | 319 | 5 | 23 | 127 |

In terms of equipment, French losses were significantly greater due to the forced evacuation of strongpoints. The deployment of armored elements on the French side resulted in the total loss of 4 medium tanks, 2 light tanks, 6 tank destroyers, and 1 armored car. On the German side, a total of 9 vehicles were lost. Around 45 vehicles had to be repaired (15 long-term and 30 short-term).

== Trivia ==
There is also a street named after BM24 in Strasbourg: "Rue du Bataillon de Marche 24".

== Notes and references ==
=== Bibliography ===
- Schramm, Percy E. (2002). Kriegstagebuch des Oberkommandos der Wehrmacht. Bd. 4 (in German). Bonn.
- Köhler, Paul (1945). MS # B559: The battle command of the LXIV AK in the bridgehead Alsace from end of December 1944 to the middle of January 1945 – Operation Erstein "Sonnenwende".
- Rigoulot, Paul (1992). "L'Opération « Sonnenwende » (7-16 janvier 1945)". Guerres Mondiales et Conflits Contemporains (in French) (166). Presses Universitaires de France: 71–88. JSTOR 25730836.
- "198. Infanterie-Division" (in German). Lexikon der Wehrmacht.
- Jentz, Thomas L. (1999). Die deutsche Panzertruppe, Bd.2, 1943-1945 (in German). Vol. 2. Podzun-Pallas. ISBN 978-3790906240.
- Dugdale, Jeff (2000). Panzer Divisions - Panzergrenadier Divisions - Panzer Brigades of the Army and the Waffen SS in the West: Autumn 1944 - February 1945, Ardennes and Nordwind, Their Detailed and Precise Strengths and Organisations. Vol. 1. Military Press. ISBN 9780854209903.
- "schwere Panzerjäger-Abteilung 654" (in German). Lexikon der Wehrmacht.
- Kurowski, Franz (1999). Sturmgeschütze Vor!. Fedorowicz (J.J.), Canada. ISBN 978-3790906240.
- Aubagnac, Gilles (1993). Le retrait des troupes noires de la 1re Armée, dans la Revue historique des armées no 2 (in French).
- "Vosges Alsace - Le 11ème régiment de Cuirassiers intégré dans la 1ère D.F.L." (in French). 11eme-cuirassiers-vercors.
- Diener-Hatt, Marie-Noèl (2014). Amicale des Anciens de la Brigade Alsace-Lorraine, Brigade indépendante Alsace-Lorraine (in French).
- Münch, Karlheinz (2001). Combat History of the 654th Schwere Panzerjager Abteilung. Fedorowicz (J.J.), Canada. ISBN 0921991606.
- "SS–Regiment Radolfzell". Axishistory.com. Archived from the original on 25 March 2023.
- "La 1re D.F.L. dans la défense de Strasbourg, par Pierre Coffinier" (in French). La Fondation de la France Libre. 26 May 2013.
- Comor, André-Paul (1998). L'épopée de la 13e Demi-brigade de Légion étrangère, 1940-1945 (in French). NEL. ISBN 2723303691.
- "269. Infanterie-Division" (in German). Lexikon der Wehrmacht.
- Bericht des Chefs des Generalstabes der 19. Armee (in German). 1945.
