= West House =

West House or Westhouse may refer to:

in France

- Westhouse, a commune in the Bas-Rhin department in Alsace in north-eastern France

in the United Kingdom

- West House (Chelsea), Grade II* listed house in London
- The West House, family restaurant in Biddenden, Kent

in the United States (by state)

- West House (Helena, Arkansas), listed on the National Register of Historic Places (NRHP)
- West House (Los Angeles), California, listed on the NRHP
- West House (Wellington, Ohio), listed on the NRHP in Lorain County
