= Limersheim =

Limersheim Limersche
- Commune
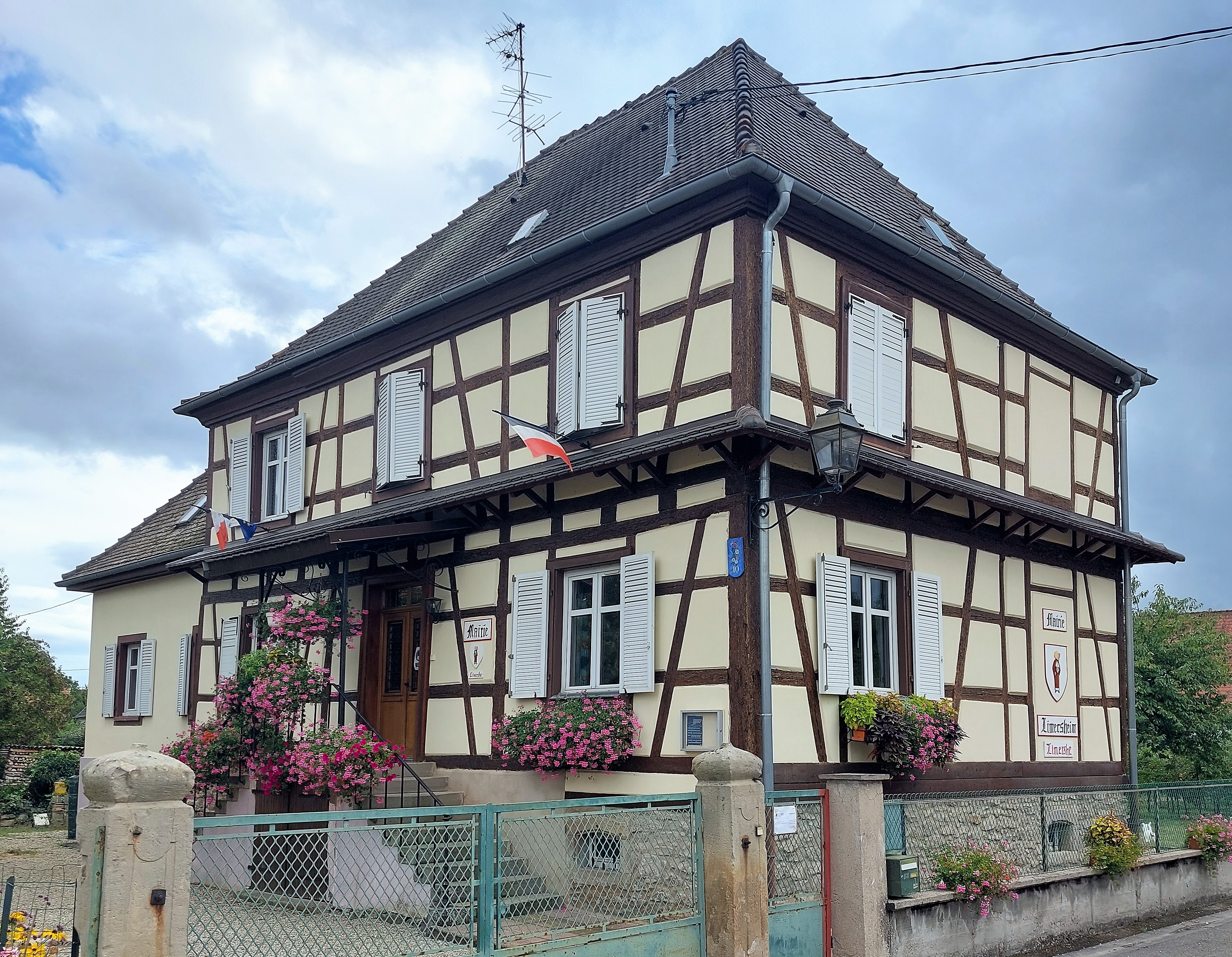
- The town hall in Limersheim

- Coat of arms
- Location of Limersheim
- Location within France Location within Grand Est
- Coordinates: 48°27′24″N 7°38′42″E
- Country: France
- Region: Grand Est
- Department: Bas-Rhin
- Arrondissement: Sélestat-Erstein
- Canton: Erstein
- Intercommunality: CC Canton d'Erstein

Government
  - Mayor (2020–2026): Stéphane Schaal
- Area^{1}: 5.58 km^{2} (2.15 sq mi)
- Highest elevation: 155 m (509 ft)
- Lowest elevation: 147 m (482 ft)
- Population (2023): 681
  - Density: 122/km^{2} (316/sq mi)
- Time zone: UTC+01:00 (CET)
  - Summer (DST): UTC+02:00 (CEST)
- INSEE/Postal code: 67266 /67150
- Website: www.limersheim.fr
- ^{1} French Land Register data, which excludes lakes, ponds, glaciers > 1 km^{2} (0.386 sq mi or 247 acres) and river estuaries.

Limersheim is a commune in the Bas-Rhin department in Alsace in north-eastern France. It is a rural tourist destination, boasting several half-timbered houses.

== Geography ==
Limersheim is positioned on the Alsace Plain, approximately eight kilometres (five miles) west of the river Rhine and some sixteen kilometres (ten miles) to the south of Strasbourg. Adjacent communes are Hindisheim und Nordhouse. The village is less than a kilometre away from departmental road RD1083, a four lane trunk road which until the extension of the autoroute network early in the twenty-first century was part of the main north-south highway through Alsace.

The village is located in the Alsace wine producing area and there is accordingly within it a street named "Rue du Vin". The rich alluvial soil characteristic of the land near this part of the Rhine is also used for the cultivation of other crops including cereals, tobacco and potatoes.

== See also ==
- Communes of the Bas-Rhin department
