= Friesenheim =

Friesenheim can refer to the following places:

- Friesenheim (Baden-Württemberg), in Baden-Württemberg, Germany
- Friesenheim, Rhineland-Palatinate, in Rhineland-Palatinate, Germany
- Friesenheim, Bas-Rhin, in Alsace, France
- Ludwigshafen-Friesenheim, one of the two "mother villages" of Ludwigshafen
