= Hipsheim =

Hipsheim Hípse
- Commune
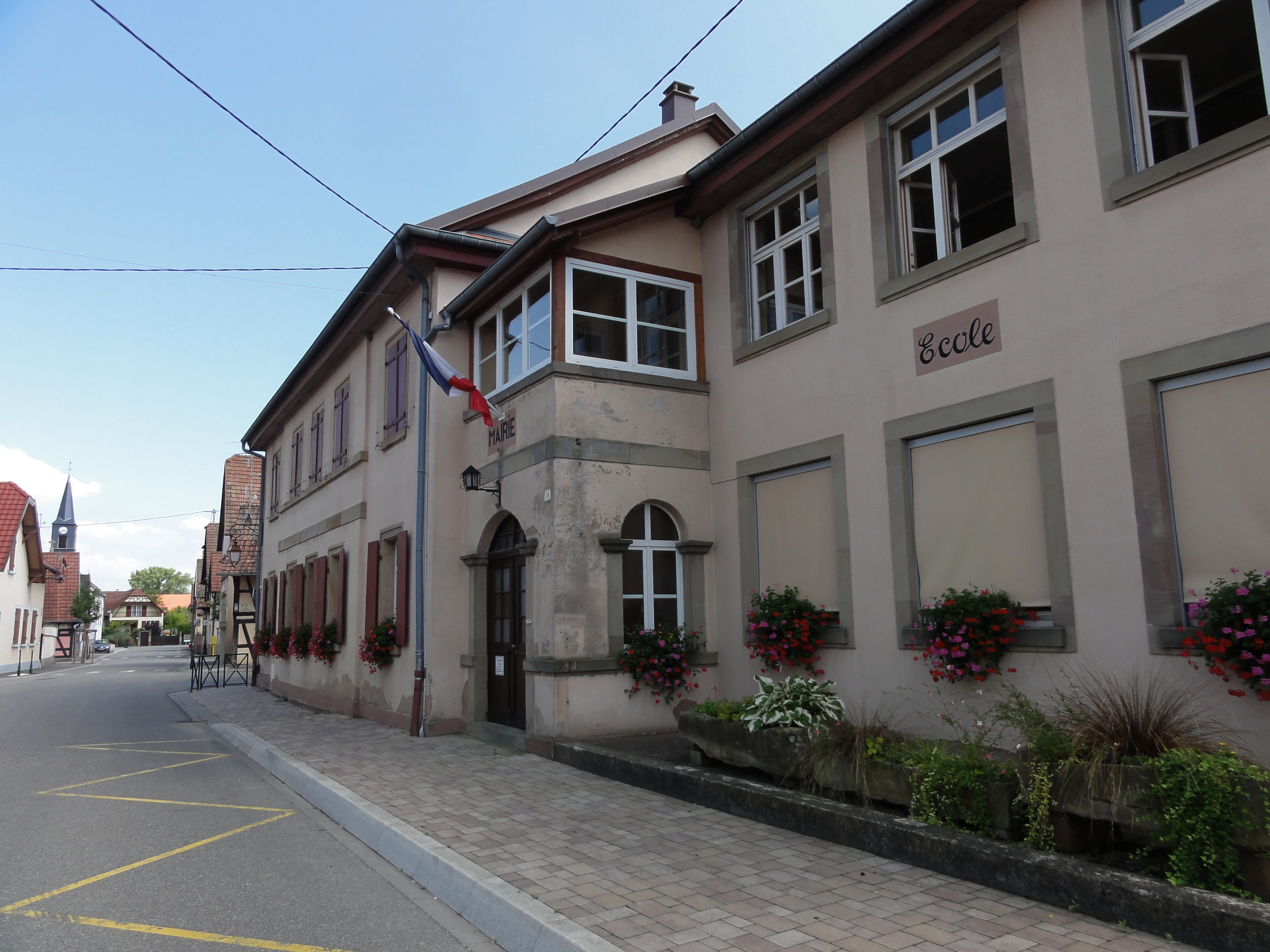
- The town hall in Hipsheim

- Coat of arms
- Location of Hipsheim
- Location within France Location within Grand Est
- Coordinates: 48°28′02″N 7°40′36″E
- Country: France
- Region: Grand Est
- Department: Bas-Rhin
- Arrondissement: Sélestat-Erstein
- Canton: Erstein
- Intercommunality: CC Canton d'Erstein

Government
  - Mayor (2020–2026): Philippe Rome
- Area^{1}: 4.52 km^{2} (1.75 sq mi)
- Highest elevation: 152 m (499 ft)
- Lowest elevation: 145 m (476 ft)
- Population (2023): 1,029
  - Density: 228/km^{2} (590/sq mi)
- Time zone: UTC+01:00 (CET)
  - Summer (DST): UTC+02:00 (CEST)
- INSEE/Postal code: 67200 /67150
- ^{1} French Land Register data, which excludes lakes, ponds, glaciers > 1 km^{2} (0.386 sq mi or 247 acres) and river estuaries.

Hipsheim (French pronunciation: [ipsaim]) is a commune in the southeast of the Bas-Rhin department in Alsace in north-eastern France.

Hipsheim is located some ten kilometres (six miles) to the south of Strasbourg.

== Landmarks ==
- The 18th-century church of Saint Ludan has a 13th-century tower near to the departmental road RD1083 (formerly RD 83)
- The Chapel of Saint Wendelin.

== See also ==
- Communes of the Bas-Rhin department
