= Schaeffersheim =

- Commune
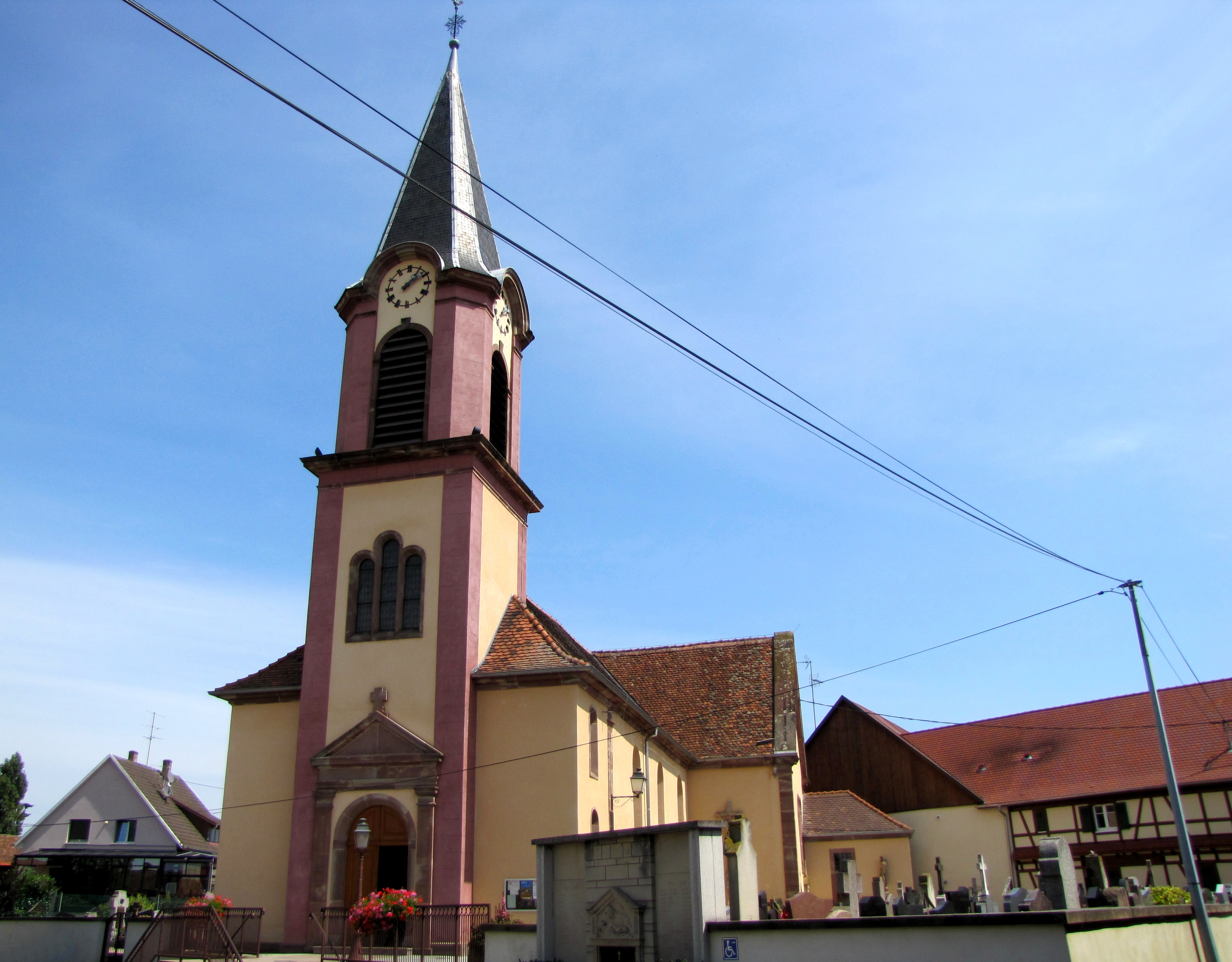
- The church in Schaeffersheim

- Coat of arms
- Location of Schaeffersheim
- Location within France Location within Grand Est
- Coordinates: 48°25′45″N 7°37′28″E
- Country: France
- Region: Grand Est
- Department: Bas-Rhin
- Arrondissement: Sélestat-Erstein
- Canton: Erstein
- Intercommunality: CC Canton d'Erstein

Government
  - Mayor (2020–2026): Marie-Berthe Kern
- Area^{1}: 3.96 km^{2} (1.53 sq mi)
- Highest elevation: 156 m (512 ft)
- Lowest elevation: 152 m (499 ft)
- Population (2023): 878
  - Density: 222/km^{2} (574/sq mi)
- Time zone: UTC+01:00 (CET)
  - Summer (DST): UTC+02:00 (CEST)
- INSEE/Postal code: 67438 /67150
- Website: www.schaeffersheim.fr
- ^{1} French Land Register data, which excludes lakes, ponds, glaciers > 1 km^{2} (0.386 sq mi or 247 acres) and river estuaries.

Schaeffersheim (German: Schäffersheim) is a commune in the Bas-Rhin department in Alsace in north-eastern France.

== See also ==
- Communes of the Bas-Rhin department
