= Ichtratzheim =

Ichtratzheim Ischterze
- Commune
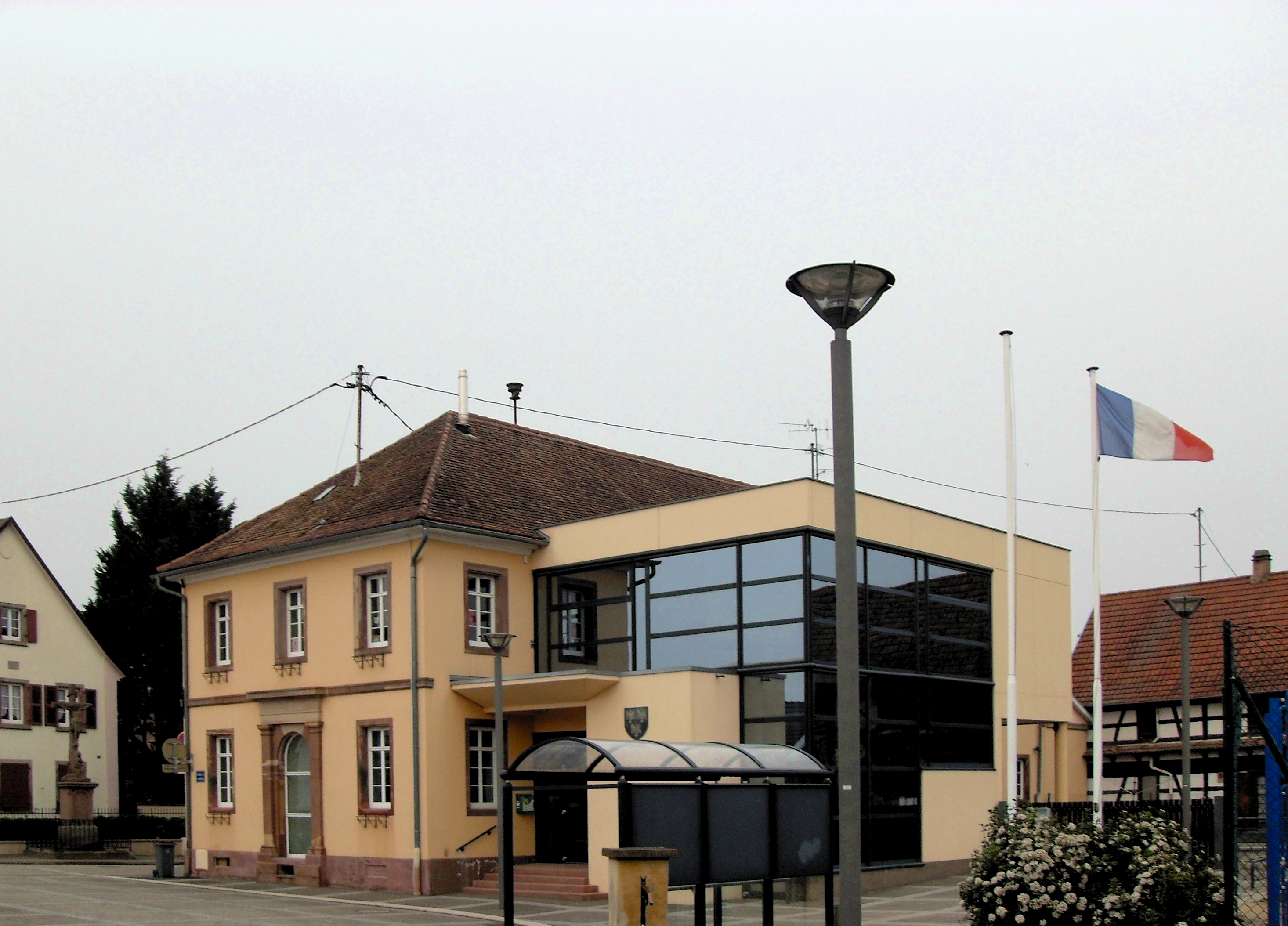
- The town hall in Ichtratzheim

- Coat of arms
- Location of Ichtratzheim
- Location within France Location within Grand Est
- Coordinates: 48°28′40″N 7°40′44″E
- Country: France
- Region: Grand Est
- Department: Bas-Rhin
- Arrondissement: Sélestat-Erstein
- Canton: Erstein
- Intercommunality: Canton d'Erstein

Government
  - Mayor (2020–2026): Grégory Gilgenmann
- Area^{1}: 3.09 km^{2} (1.19 sq mi)
- Highest elevation: 151 m (495 ft)
- Lowest elevation: 145 m (476 ft)
- Population (2023): 396
  - Density: 128/km^{2} (332/sq mi)
- Time zone: UTC+01:00 (CET)
  - Summer (DST): UTC+02:00 (CEST)
- INSEE/Postal code: 67217 /67640
- ^{1} French Land Register data, which excludes lakes, ponds, glaciers > 1 km^{2} (0.386 sq mi or 247 acres) and river estuaries.

Ichtratzheim is a commune in the Bas-Rhin department in Grand Est in north-eastern France.

== Geography ==
To the east the village is flanked by woodland. On the western side run departmental road RD1083 and the railway line connecting Strasbourg and Sélestat.

Agriculture is an important element in the local economy.

== Population ==
Historical population
| Year | Pop. | ±% p.a. |
|---|---|---|
| 1968 | 206 | — |
| 1975 | 286 | +4.80% |
| 1982 | 295 | +0.44% |
| 1990 | 280 | −0.65% |
| 1999 | 282 | +0.08% |
| 2007 | 293 | +0.48% |
| 2012 | 270 | −1.62% |
| 2017 | 327 | +3.91% |
| 2023 | 396 | +3.24% |
Source: INSEE

== See also ==
- Communes of the Bas-Rhin department
