= Bolsenheim =

Bolsenheim Bolsene
- Commune
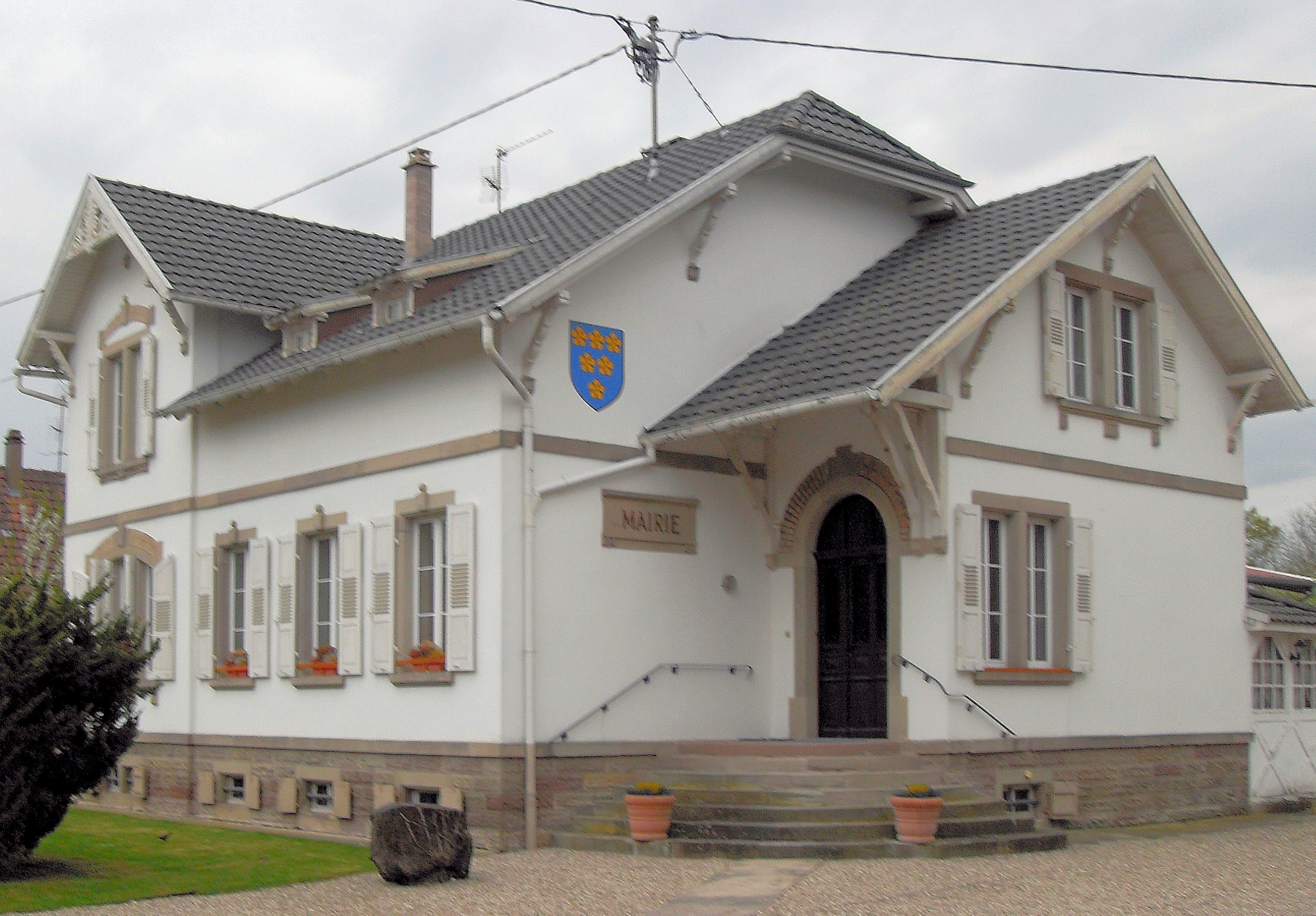
- The town hall in Bolsenheim

- Coat of arms
- Location of Bolsenheim
- Location within France Location within Grand Est
- Coordinates: 48°25′11″N 7°36′34″E
- Country: France
- Region: Grand Est
- Department: Bas-Rhin
- Arrondissement: Sélestat-Erstein
- Canton: Erstein
- Intercommunality: CC Canton d'Erstein

Government
  - Mayor (2020–2026): Patrick Girard
- Area^{1}: 4.35 km^{2} (1.68 sq mi)
- Highest elevation: 157 m (515 ft)
- Lowest elevation: 152 m (499 ft)
- Population (2023): 577
  - Density: 133/km^{2} (344/sq mi)
- Time zone: UTC+01:00 (CET)
  - Summer (DST): UTC+02:00 (CEST)
- INSEE/Postal code: 67054 /67150
- ^{1} French Land Register data, which excludes lakes, ponds, glaciers > 1 km^{2} (0.386 sq mi or 247 acres) and river estuaries.

Bolsenheim (German pronunciation: [bɔlsənaim]; Alsatian: Bolsene) is a commune in the Bas-Rhin department in Alsace in north-eastern France.

== See also ==
- Communes of the Bas-Rhin department
