= Ludan =

Saint Ludan
- Born: Scotland
- Died: 1202; Nordhouse, France
- Venerated in: Roman Catholic Church
- Feast: 12 February

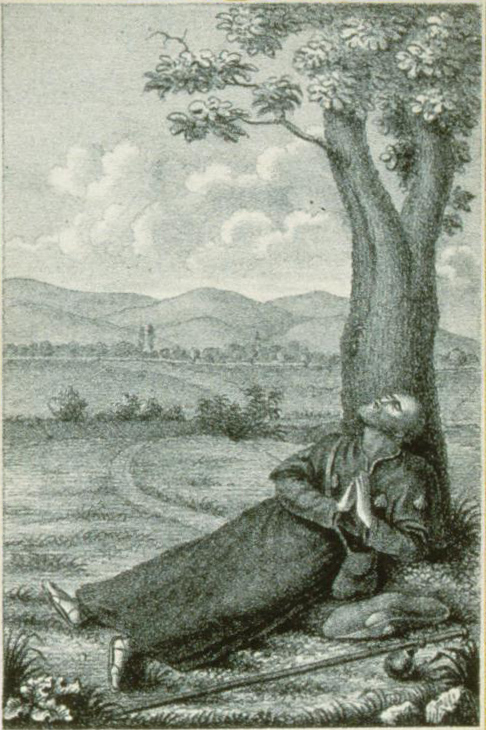
The death of Saint Ludan, 19th century lithograph.

Ludan, also known as Ludain or Luden, was a Scottish pilgrim to Jerusalem. On his return he died at Scherkirchen, near the city of Strasbourg, France, at which time the bells of a local church began to ring.

== Life ==
The son of Hildebod, a Scottish duke, he employed all his fortune after the death of his father to help the poor. He built a hospital for foreigners, sick, poor and infirm, among other things. He then went on pilgrimage to Jerusalem and returned to Alsace. He died of a cold or similar affliction under a tree in Nordhouse, 12 February 1202.

It is said that the following words were found in his wallet: "I am the son of the noble Hildebod, a Duke of Scotland, and I made myself a pilgrim for the love of God."

His body was recovered by people from the village of Hipsheim, where he was buried in their village church, the Scheerkirche. His tomb there was destroyed during the Swedish war.

According to the hagiographic Dictionary of Saints published by the Benedictines of St. Augustine Abbey of Ramsgate (GB) in accordance with the Roman Calendar, promulgated in 1969:

Saint Ludan, his name in French being written as Loudain, died in 1202. The saint of this name is venerated at Scherkirchen, Bas-Rhin, and was from Scotland or Ireland. Returning from a pilgrimage to the Holy Land, he died in Alsace, France, and his entrance to heaven is celebrated on 12 February.
