= Uttenheim =

- Commune
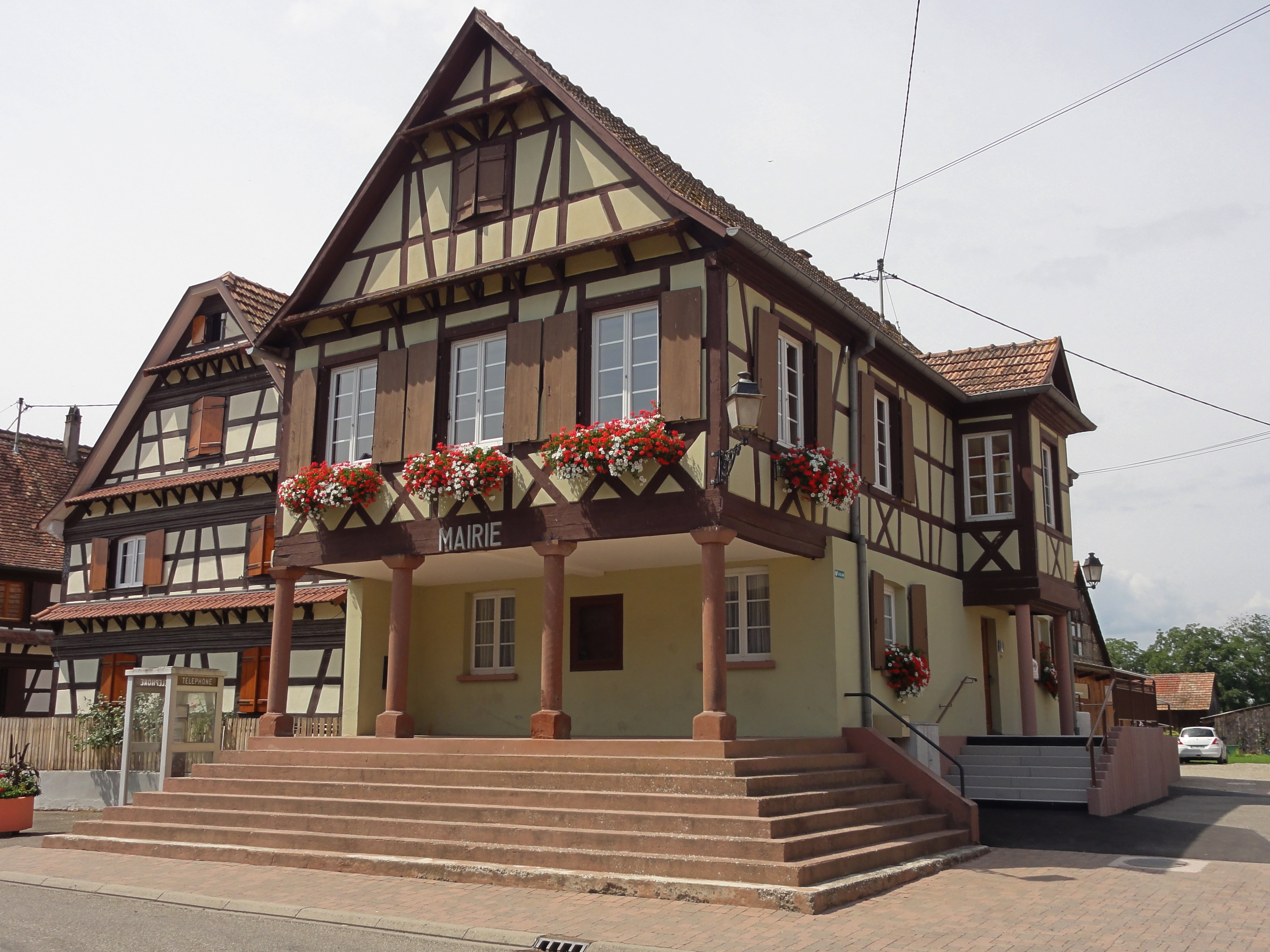
- The town hall in Uttenheim

- Coat of arms
- Location of Uttenheim
- Location within France Location within Grand Est
- Coordinates: 48°24′43″N 7°35′53″E
- Country: France
- Region: Grand Est
- Department: Bas-Rhin
- Arrondissement: Sélestat-Erstein
- Canton: Erstein
- Intercommunality: CC Canton d'Erstein

Government
  - Mayor (2020–2026): Jean-Pierre Issenhuth
- Area^{1}: 4.77 km^{2} (1.84 sq mi)
- Highest elevation: 159 m (522 ft)
- Lowest elevation: 153 m (502 ft)
- Population (2023): 596
  - Density: 125/km^{2} (324/sq mi)
- Time zone: UTC+01:00 (CET)
  - Summer (DST): UTC+02:00 (CEST)
- INSEE/Postal code: 67501 /67150
- ^{1} French Land Register data, which excludes lakes, ponds, glaciers > 1 km^{2} (0.386 sq mi or 247 acres) and river estuaries.

Uttenheim is a commune in the Bas-Rhin department in Alsace in north-eastern France.

== See also ==
- Communes of the Bas-Rhin department
