= Kertzfeld =

- Commune
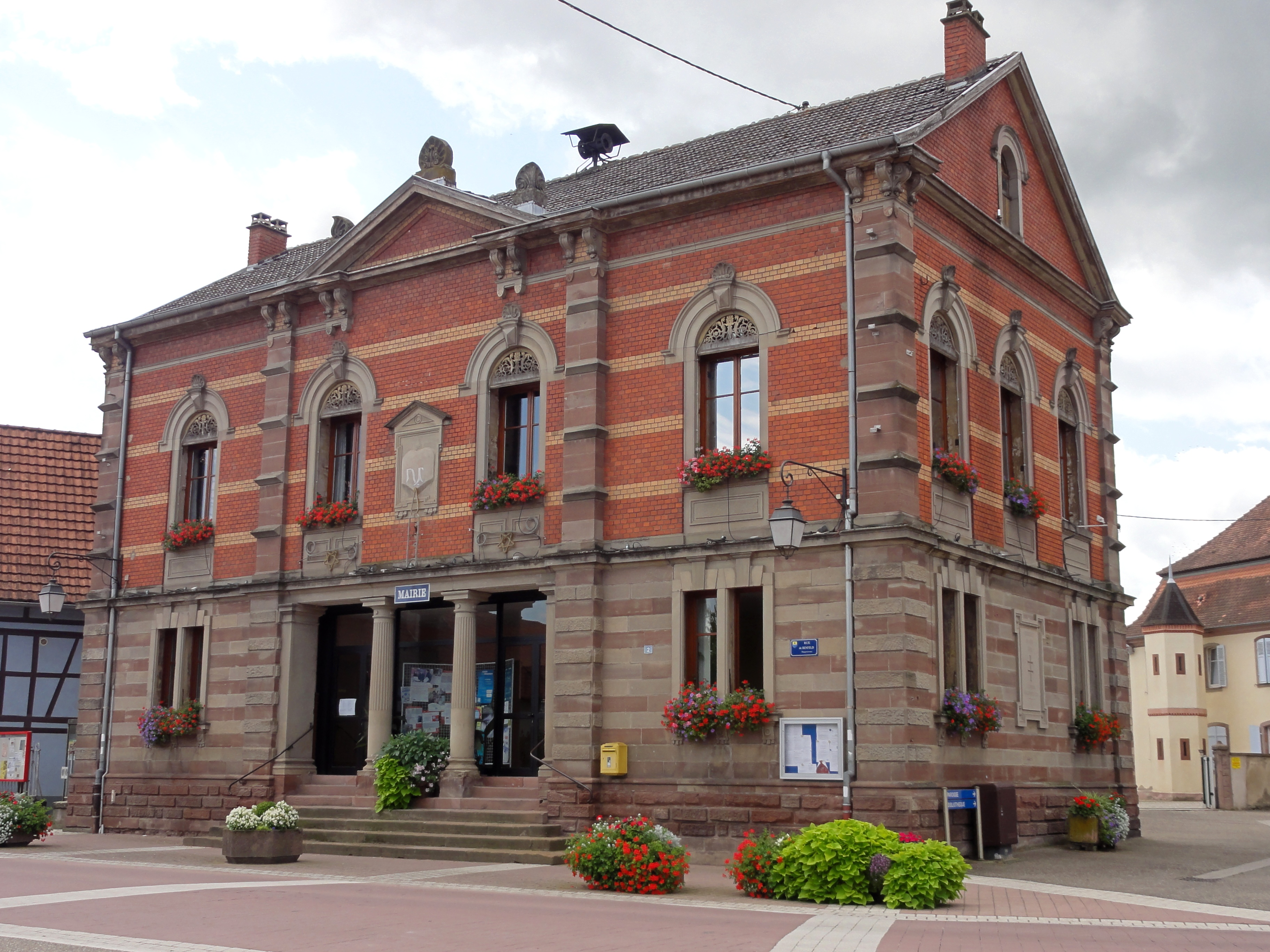
- The town hall in Kertzfeld

- Coat of arms
- Location of Kertzfeld
- Location within France Location within Grand Est
- Coordinates: 48°22′52″N 7°34′07″E
- Country: France
- Region: Grand Est
- Department: Bas-Rhin
- Arrondissement: Sélestat-Erstein
- Canton: Erstein
- Intercommunality: CC Canton d'Erstein

Government
  - Mayor (2020–2026): Brigitte Bimboes-Otzenberger
- Area^{1}: 9.43 km^{2} (3.64 sq mi)
- Highest elevation: 161 m (528 ft)
- Lowest elevation: 153 m (502 ft)
- Population (2023): 1,255
  - Density: 133/km^{2} (345/sq mi)
- Time zone: UTC+01:00 (CET)
  - Summer (DST): UTC+02:00 (CEST)
- INSEE/Postal code: 67233 /67230
- ^{1} French Land Register data, which excludes lakes, ponds, glaciers > 1 km^{2} (0.386 sq mi or 247 acres) and river estuaries.

Kertzfeld (German: Kerzfeld) is a commune in the Bas-Rhin department in Grand Est in north-eastern France.

== Geography ==
The village is positioned between Sélestat and Strasbourg. Close by, across the main road that connects these two cities, is the village of Benfeld, and some twelve kilometres (seven miles) to the east of that are Rhinau and the Rhine river ferry crossing into Germany.

The departmental road RD5 runs through the village which is surrounded by farmland.

== Christmas ==
A traditional Christmas market has been held since 1996 over the weekend roughly four weeks before Christmas.

== See also ==
- Communes of the Bas-Rhin department
