= Diebolsheim =

Diebolsheim Díwelse
- Commune
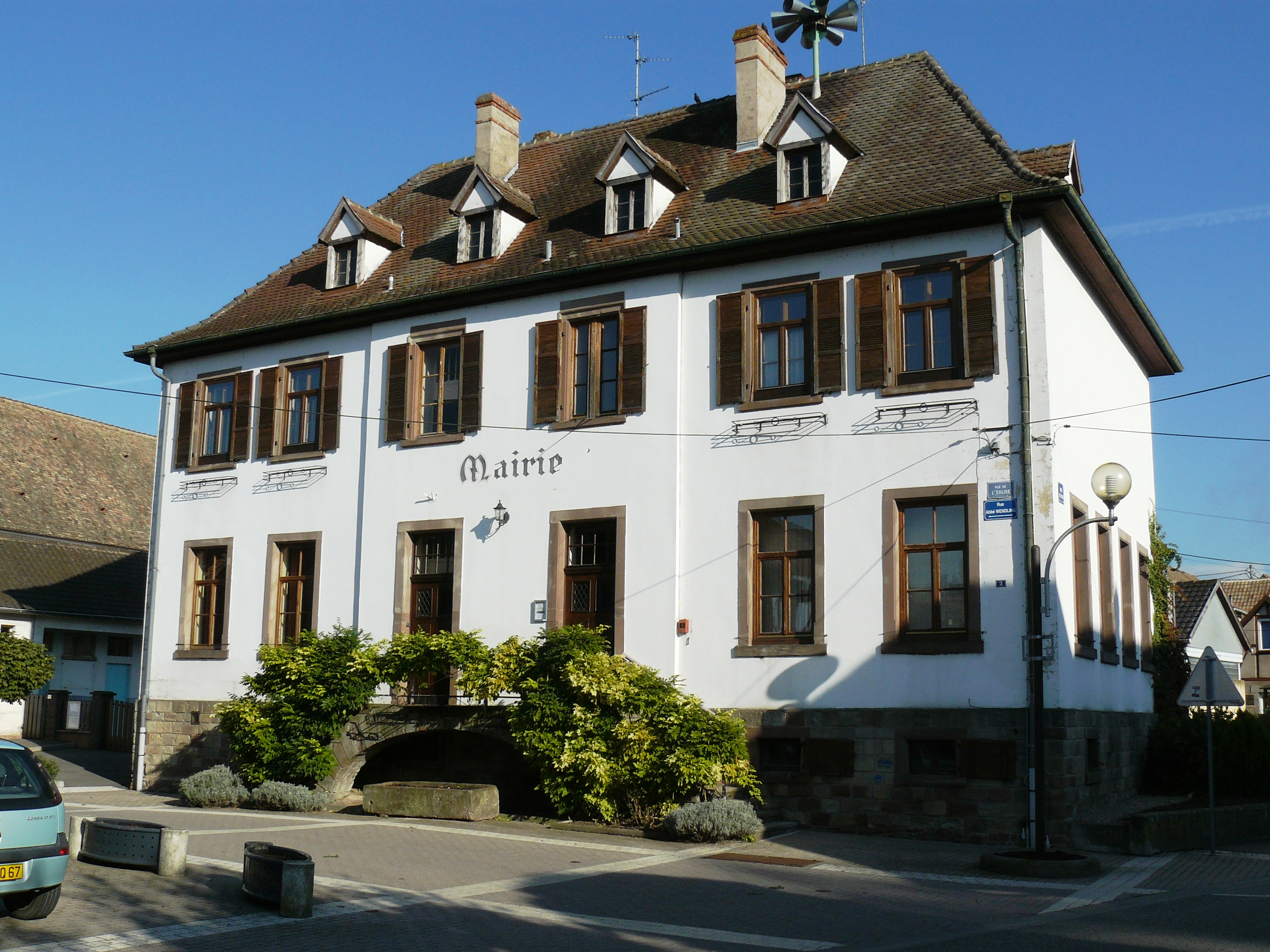
- Town Hall, Diebolsheim

- Coat of arms
- Location of Diebolsheim
- Location within France Location within Grand Est
- Coordinates: 48°17′30″N 7°39′51″E
- Country: France
- Region: Grand Est
- Department: Bas-Rhin
- Arrondissement: Sélestat-Erstein
- Canton: Erstein

Government
  - Mayor (2020–2026): Brigitte Neiter
- Area^{1}: 7.03 km^{2} (2.71 sq mi)
- Highest elevation: 165 m (541 ft)
- Lowest elevation: 160 m (520 ft)
- Population (2023): 675
  - Density: 96.0/km^{2} (249/sq mi)
- Time zone: UTC+01:00 (CET)
  - Summer (DST): UTC+02:00 (CEST)
- INSEE/Postal code: 67090 /67230
- ^{1} French Land Register data, which excludes lakes, ponds, glaciers > 1 km^{2} (0.386 sq mi or 247 acres) and river estuaries.

Diebolsheim (French pronunciation: [dibɔlsaim]; Alsatian: Díwelse) is a commune in the Bas-Rhin department in Alsace in north-eastern France.

== See also ==
- Communes of the Bas-Rhin department
