= Kogenheim =

Kogenheim Koiene
- Commune
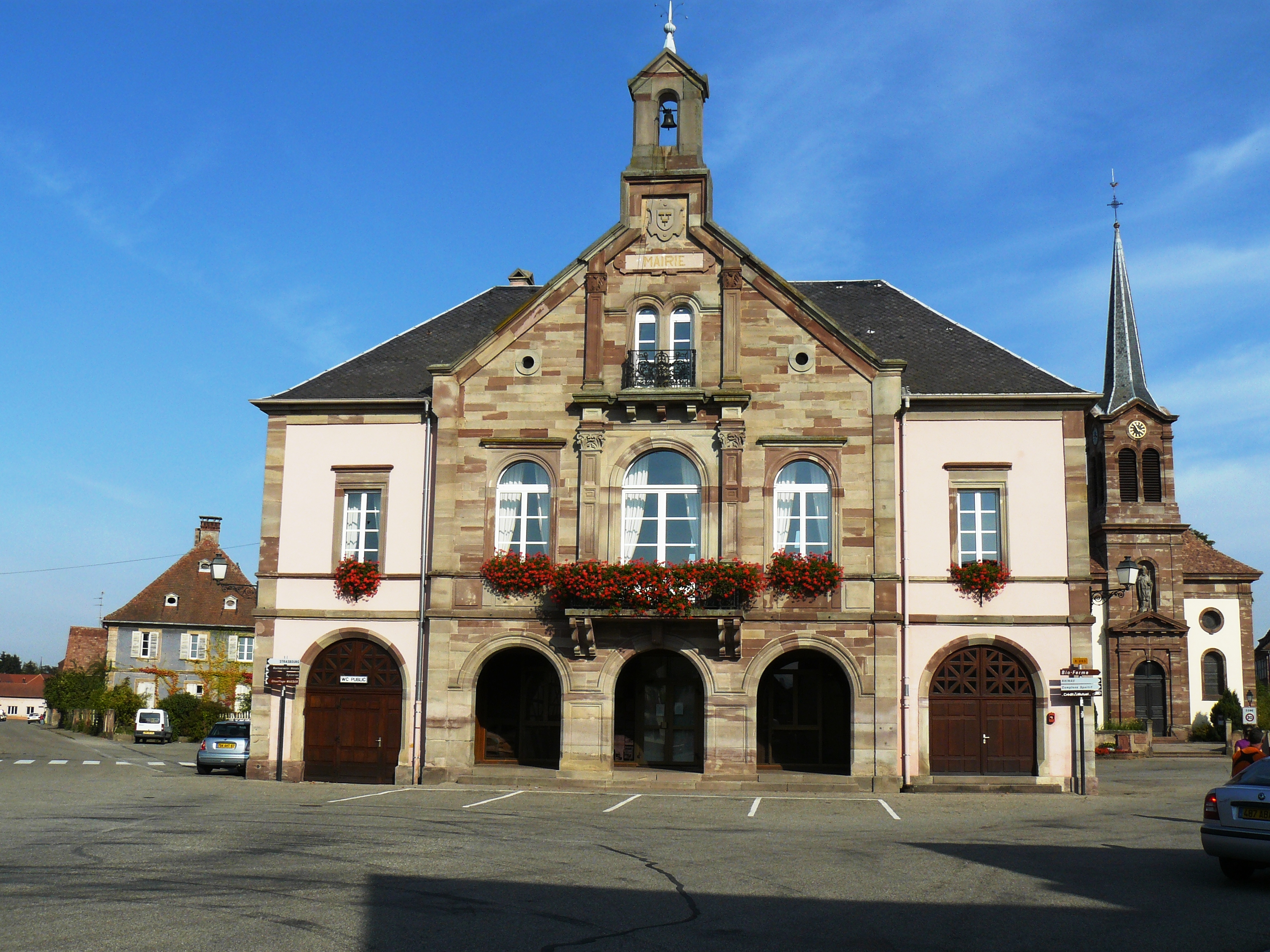
- The town hall in Kogenheim

- Coat of arms
- Location of Kogenheim
- Location within France Location within Grand Est
- Coordinates: 48°20′17″N 7°32′32″E
- Country: France
- Region: Grand Est
- Department: Bas-Rhin
- Arrondissement: Sélestat-Erstein
- Canton: Erstein
- Intercommunality: CC Canton d'Erstein

Government
  - Mayor (2020–2026): Guillaume Forgiarini
- Area^{1}: 11.77 km^{2} (4.54 sq mi)
- Highest elevation: 166 m (545 ft)
- Lowest elevation: 159 m (522 ft)
- Population (2023): 1,172
  - Density: 99.58/km^{2} (257.9/sq mi)
- Time zone: UTC+01:00 (CET)
  - Summer (DST): UTC+02:00 (CEST)
- INSEE/Postal code: 67246 /67230
- ^{1} French Land Register data, which excludes lakes, ponds, glaciers > 1 km^{2} (0.386 sq mi or 247 acres) and river estuaries.

Kogenheim (French pronunciation: [koɡənaim]; Alsatian: Koiene) is a commune in the Bas-Rhin department in Grand Est in north-eastern France.

== Geography ==
The commune is on the east of the Route Nationale RN83, till recently the main road linking Strasbourg with Colmar and still, despite extensive official 'declassification' following the opening of the Autoroute A35 a short distance to the west, a major regional road artery. Kogenheim also has its own railway station.

== See also ==
- Communes of the Bas-Rhin department
