= Daubensand =

Daubensand Düwesànd
- Commune
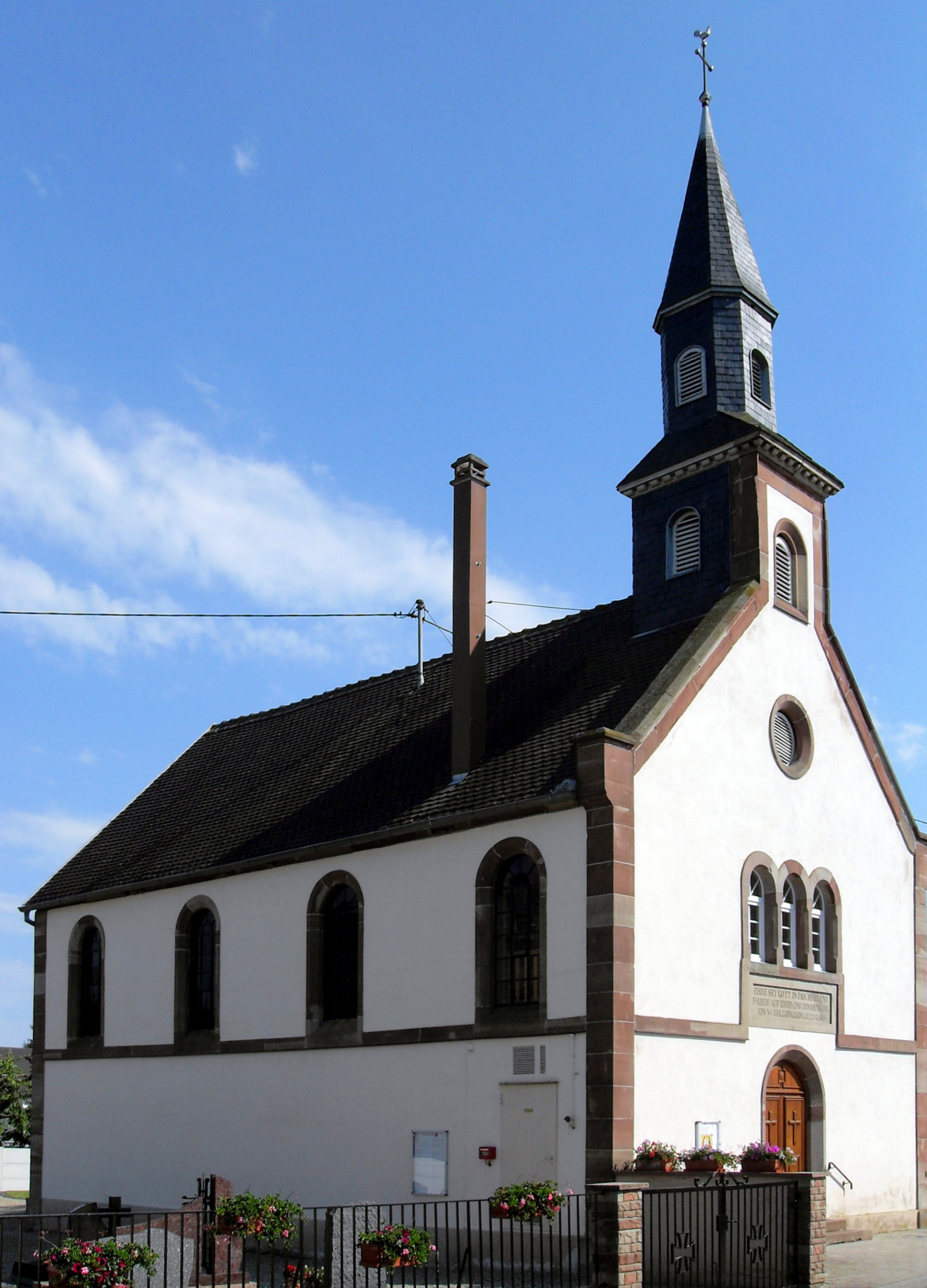
- The Lutheran church in Daubensand

- Coat of arms
- Location of Daubensand
- Location within France Location within Grand Est
- Coordinates: 48°20′52″N 7°43′21″E
- Country: France
- Region: Grand Est
- Department: Bas-Rhin
- Arrondissement: Sélestat-Erstein
- Canton: Erstein

Government
  - Mayor (2020–2026): Estelle Bronn
- Area^{1}: 3.87 km^{2} (1.49 sq mi)
- Highest elevation: 157 m (515 ft)
- Lowest elevation: 153 m (502 ft)
- Population (2023): 388
  - Density: 100/km^{2} (260/sq mi)
- Time zone: UTC+01:00 (CET)
  - Summer (DST): UTC+02:00 (CEST)
- INSEE/Postal code: 67086 /67150
- ^{1} French Land Register data, which excludes lakes, ponds, glaciers > 1 km^{2} (0.386 sq mi or 247 acres) and river estuaries.

Daubensand is a commune in the Bas-Rhin department in Alsace in north-eastern France.

== See also ==
- Communes of the Bas-Rhin department
