= Canton of Erstein =

Coordinates: 48°25′16″N 7°39′15″E

Erstein
- Canton
- Country: France
- Region: Grand Est
- Department: Bas-Rhin
- No. of communes: {{{nbcomm}}}
- Area: 268.51 km^{2} (103.67 sq mi)
- Population (2023): 49,067
  - Density: 182.74/km^{2} (473.29/sq mi)
- INSEE code: 6704

The canton of Erstein is a canton of France, located in the Bas-Rhin department, in the Grand Est region. Since the French canton reorganisation which came into effect in March 2015, the communes of the canton of Erstein are:

1. Benfeld
2. Bolsenheim
3. Boofzheim
4. Daubensand
5. Diebolsheim
6. Erstein
7. Friesenheim
8. Gerstheim
9. Herbsheim
10. Hindisheim
11. Hipsheim
12. Huttenheim
13. Ichtratzheim
14. Kertzfeld
15. Kogenheim
16. Limersheim
17. Matzenheim
18. Nordhouse
19. Obenheim
20. Osthouse
21. Rhinau
22. Rossfeld
23. Sand
24. Schaeffersheim
25. Sermersheim
26. Uttenheim
27. Westhouse
28. Witternheim

== See also ==
- Cantons of the Bas-Rhin department
