= Matzenheim =

Matzenheim Màtzene
- Commune
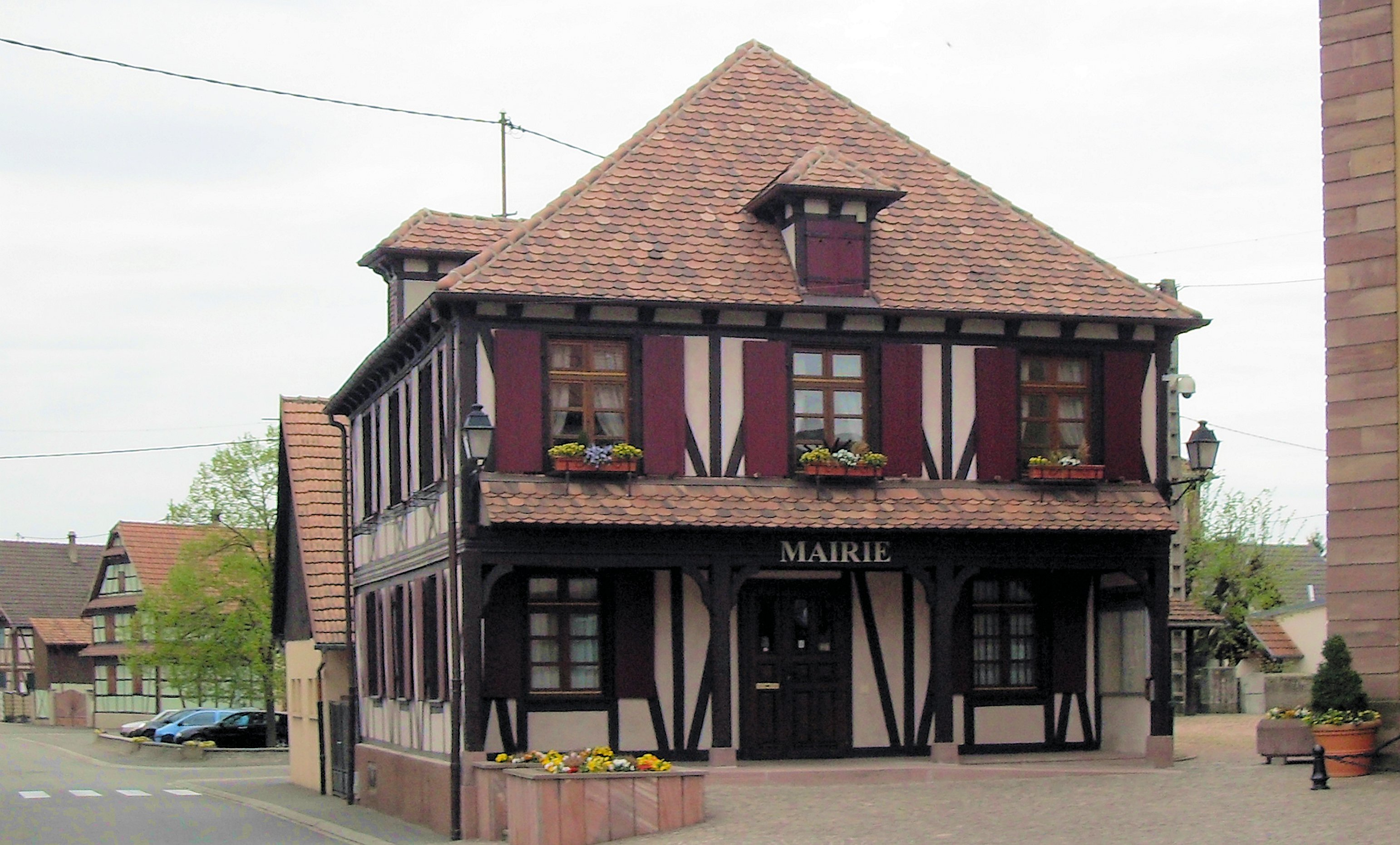
- The town hall in Matzenheim

- Coat of arms
- Location of Matzenheim
- Location within France Location within Grand Est
- Coordinates: 48°23′44″N 7°37′25″E
- Country: France
- Region: Grand Est
- Department: Bas-Rhin
- Arrondissement: Sélestat-Erstein
- Canton: Erstein
- Intercommunality: CC Canton d'Erstein

Government
  - Mayor (2020–2026): Laurent Jehl
- Area^{1}: 7.14 km^{2} (2.76 sq mi)
- Highest elevation: 159 m (522 ft)
- Lowest elevation: 153 m (502 ft)
- Population (2023): 1,494
  - Density: 209/km^{2} (542/sq mi)
- Time zone: UTC+01:00 (CET)
  - Summer (DST): UTC+02:00 (CEST)
- INSEE/Postal code: 67285 /67150
- ^{1} French Land Register data, which excludes lakes, ponds, glaciers > 1 km^{2} (0.386 sq mi or 247 acres) and river estuaries.

Matzenheim (French pronunciation: [matsənaim]) is a commune in the Bas-Rhin department in Grand Est in north-eastern France.

== Population ==
Historical population

Year	Pop.	±% p.a.
1793	608	—
1800	512	−2.43%
1806	636	+3.68%
1821	703	+0.67%
1831	758	+0.76%
1836	769	+0.29%
1841	775	+0.16%
1846	701	−1.99%
1851	725	+0.68%
1856	727	+0.06%
1861	720	−0.19%
1866	705	−0.42%
1871	767	+1.70%
1875	730	−1.23%
1880	879	+3.78%
1885	952	+1.61%
1890	978	+0.54%
1895	964	−0.29%
1900	968	+0.08%

Year	Pop.	±% p.a.
1905	964	−0.08%
1910	948	−0.33%
1921	971	+0.22%
1926	984	+0.27%
1931	994	+0.20%
1936	965	−0.59%
1946	902	−0.67%
1954	1,019	+1.54%
1962	657	−5.34%
1968	667	+0.25%
1975	665	−0.04%
1982	1,027	+6.41%
1990	1,130	+1.20%
1999	1,133	+0.03%
2007	1,448	+3.11%
2012	1,416	−0.45%
2017	1,429	+0.18%
2023	1,494	+0.74%

Source: EHESS and INSEE

== See also ==
- Communes of the Bas-Rhin department
