= Hindisheim =

Hindisheim Híndse
- Commune
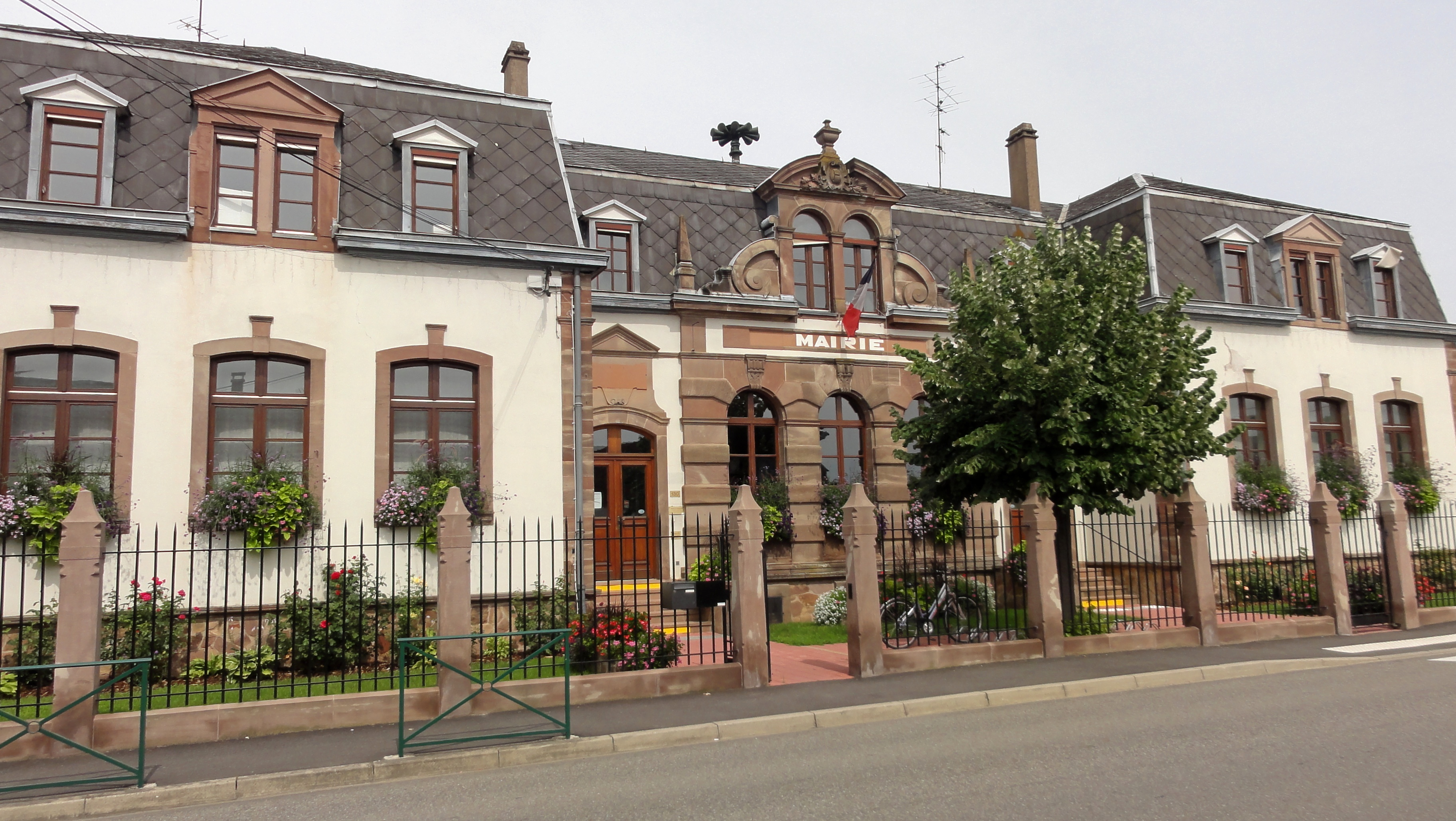
- The town hall in Hindisheim

- Coat of arms
- Location of Hindisheim
- Location within France Location within Grand Est
- Coordinates: 48°28′11″N 7°38′23″E
- Country: France
- Region: Grand Est
- Department: Bas-Rhin
- Arrondissement: Sélestat-Erstein
- Canton: Erstein
- Intercommunality: CC Canton d'Erstein

Government
  - Mayor (2020–2026): Pascal Nothisen
- Area^{1}: 11.84 km^{2} (4.57 sq mi)
- Highest elevation: 154 m (505 ft)
- Lowest elevation: 148 m (486 ft)
- Population (2023): 1,565
  - Density: 132.2/km^{2} (342.3/sq mi)
- Time zone: UTC+01:00 (CET)
  - Summer (DST): UTC+02:00 (CEST)
- INSEE/Postal code: 67197 /67150
- Website: www.hindisheim.fr
- ^{1} French Land Register data, which excludes lakes, ponds, glaciers > 1 km^{2} (0.386 sq mi or 247 acres) and river estuaries.

Hindisheim (French pronunciation: [indisaim]) is a commune in the Bas-Rhin department in Alsace in north-eastern France.

Agriculture retains a leading role in the local economy.

== Geography ==
The village is positioned some twenty kilometres (twelve miles) to the south of Strasbourg, beside the little River Andlau.

== Landmarks ==
- Chapel of the Virgin Mary (fifteenth century). Unusually even in Alsace, this features a half timbered bell tower.
- Church of Saints Peter and Paul (nineteenth century). The church contains a Rinckenbach organ (1922).

== See also ==
- Communes of the Bas-Rhin department
