= Westhouse =

- Commune
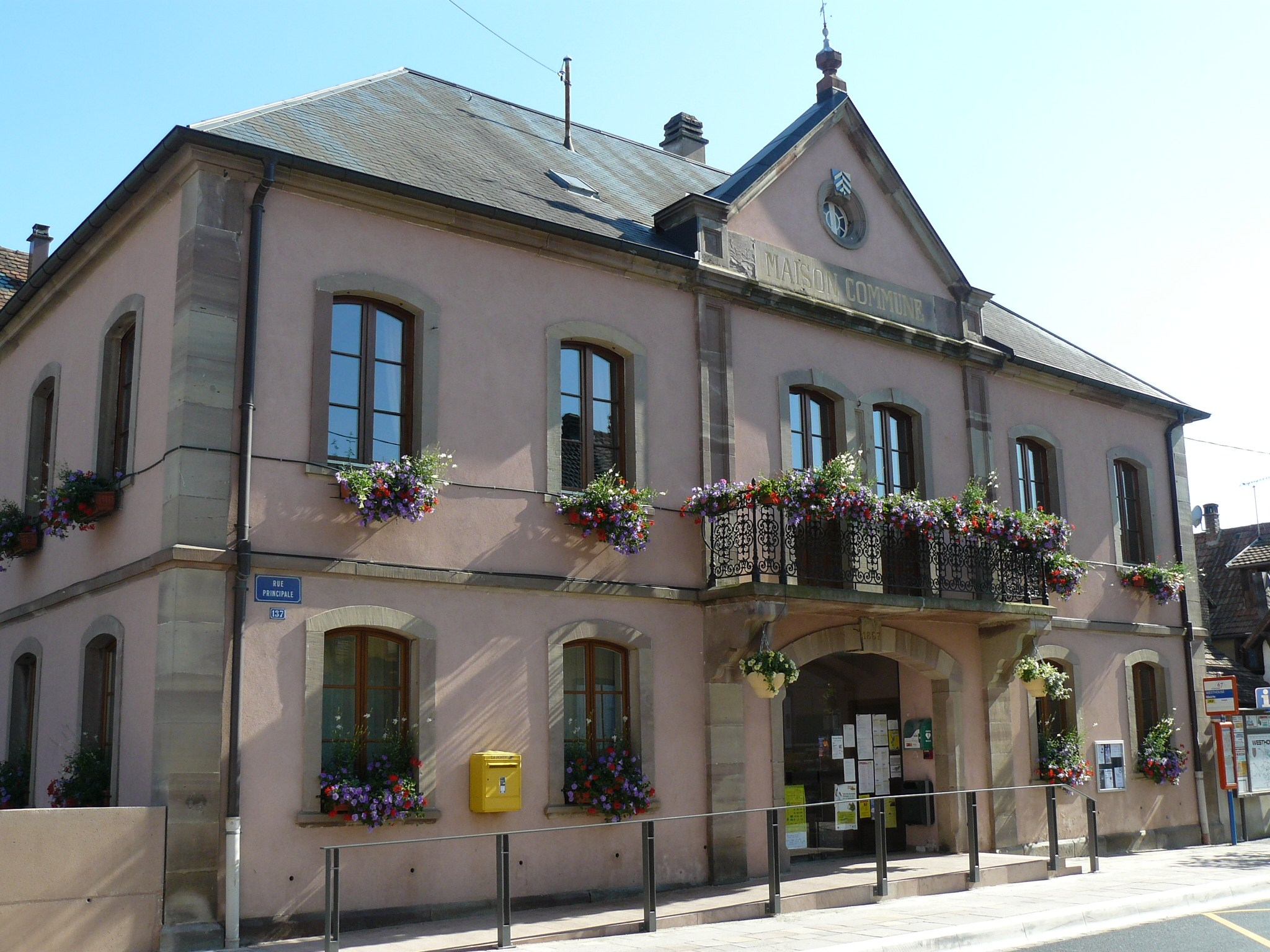
- The town hall in Westhouse

- Coat of arms
- Location of Westhouse
- Location within France Location within Grand Est
- Coordinates: 48°23′52″N 7°35′24″E
- Country: France
- Region: Grand Est
- Department: Bas-Rhin
- Arrondissement: Sélestat-Erstein
- Canton: Erstein
- Intercommunality: Canton d'Erstein

Government
  - Mayor (2020–2026): Christian Striebel
- Area^{1}: 11.94 km^{2} (4.61 sq mi)
- Highest elevation: 159 m (522 ft)
- Lowest elevation: 153 m (502 ft)
- Population (2023): 1,639
  - Density: 137.3/km^{2} (355.5/sq mi)
- Time zone: UTC+01:00 (CET)
  - Summer (DST): UTC+02:00 (CEST)
- INSEE/Postal code: 67526 /67230
- ^{1} French Land Register data, which excludes lakes, ponds, glaciers > 1 km^{2} (0.386 sq mi or 247 acres) and river estuaries.

Westhouse (French pronunciation: [vɛstuz]; German: Westhausen) is a commune in the Bas-Rhin department in Alsace in north-eastern France.

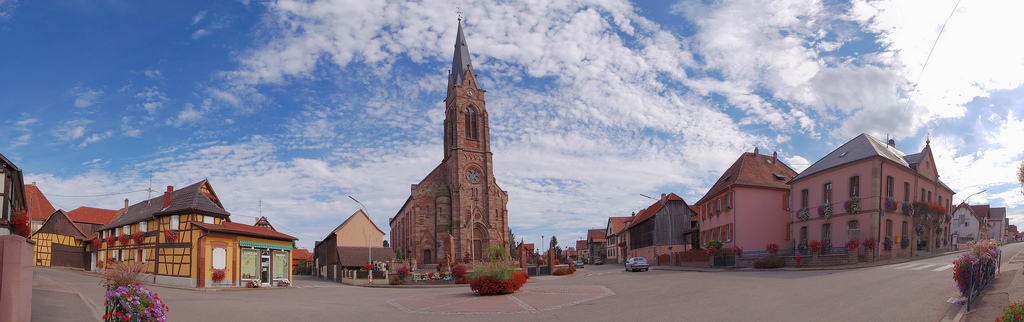
Main square of Westhouse

== Population ==
Historical population
Year	Pop.	±% p.a.
1968	941	—
1975	922	−0.29%
1982	953	+0.47%
1990	1,170	+2.60%
1999	1,351	+1.61%
2007	1,416	+0.59%
2012	1,441	+0.35%
2017	1,515	+1.01%
2023	1,639	+1.32%
Source: INSEE

== See also ==
- Communes of the Bas-Rhin department
