= The West House =

Coordinates: 51°6′54″N 0°38′35″E

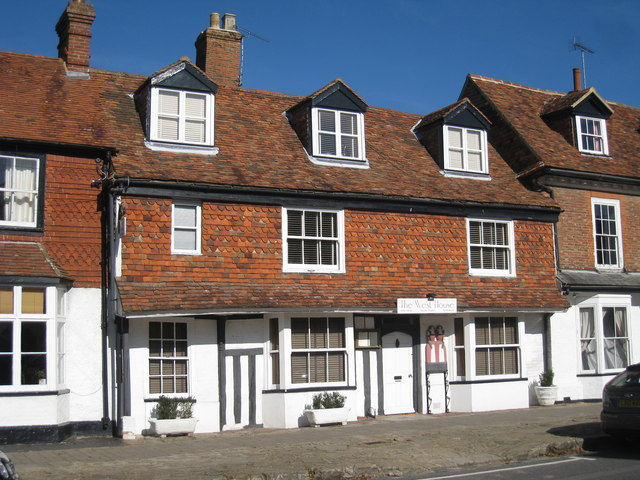
- Interactive map of The West House

Restaurant information
- Rating: (Michelin Guide 2008–2019)
- Location: Biddenden, Kent, England

The West House is a family restaurant located in Biddenden, Kent, England. The restaurant was founded in 2002, and is operated by chef Graham Garrett. It is housed in a 16th century Flemish weaver's cottage, alongside four bedrooms. From 2003 to 2019 the restaurant held one Michelin star. Garrett has also published an autobiographical cookbook, titled Sex & Drugs & Sausage Rolls. It became a grade II listed building on 4 June 1952.
