= Nordhouse =

- Commune
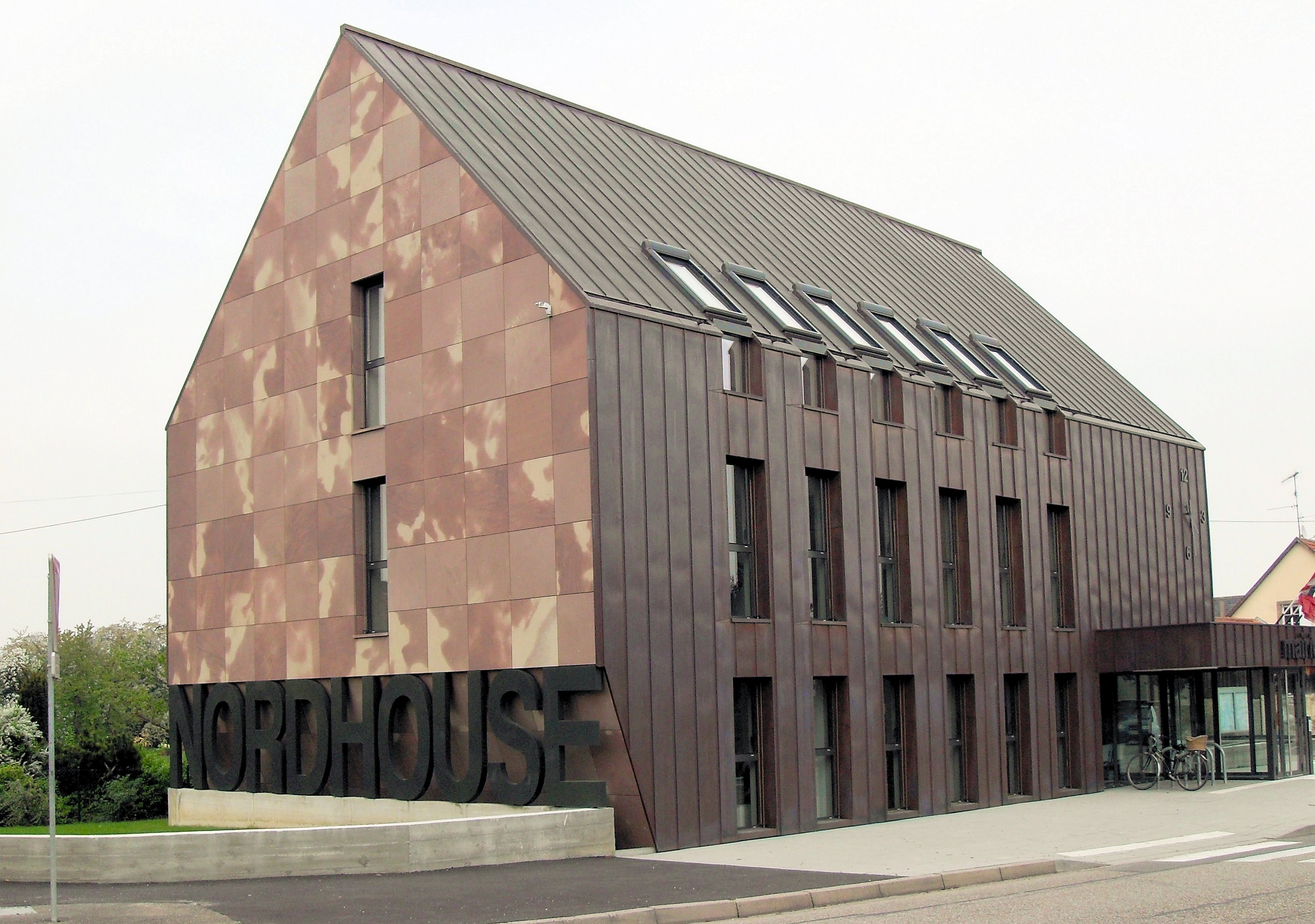
- The town hall in Nordhouse

- Coat of arms
- Location of Nordhouse
- Location within France Location within Grand Est
- Coordinates: 48°26′57″N 7°40′25″E
- Country: France
- Region: Grand Est
- Department: Bas-Rhin
- Arrondissement: Sélestat-Erstein
- Canton: Erstein
- Intercommunality: CC Canton d'Erstein

Government
  - Mayor (2020–2026): Jean-Marie Rohmer
- Area^{1}: 11 km^{2} (4.2 sq mi)
- Highest elevation: 155 m (509 ft)
- Lowest elevation: 146 m (479 ft)
- Population (2023): 1,753
  - Density: 160/km^{2} (410/sq mi)
- Time zone: UTC+01:00 (CET)
  - Summer (DST): UTC+02:00 (CEST)
- INSEE/Postal code: 67336 /67150
- ^{1} French Land Register data, which excludes lakes, ponds, glaciers > 1 km^{2} (0.386 sq mi or 247 acres) and river estuaries.

Nordhouse (French pronunciation: [nɔʁduz]; German: Nordhausen) is a commune in the Bas-Rhin department in Alsace in north-eastern France.

== See also ==
- Communes of the Bas-Rhin department
