= Witternheim =

- Commune
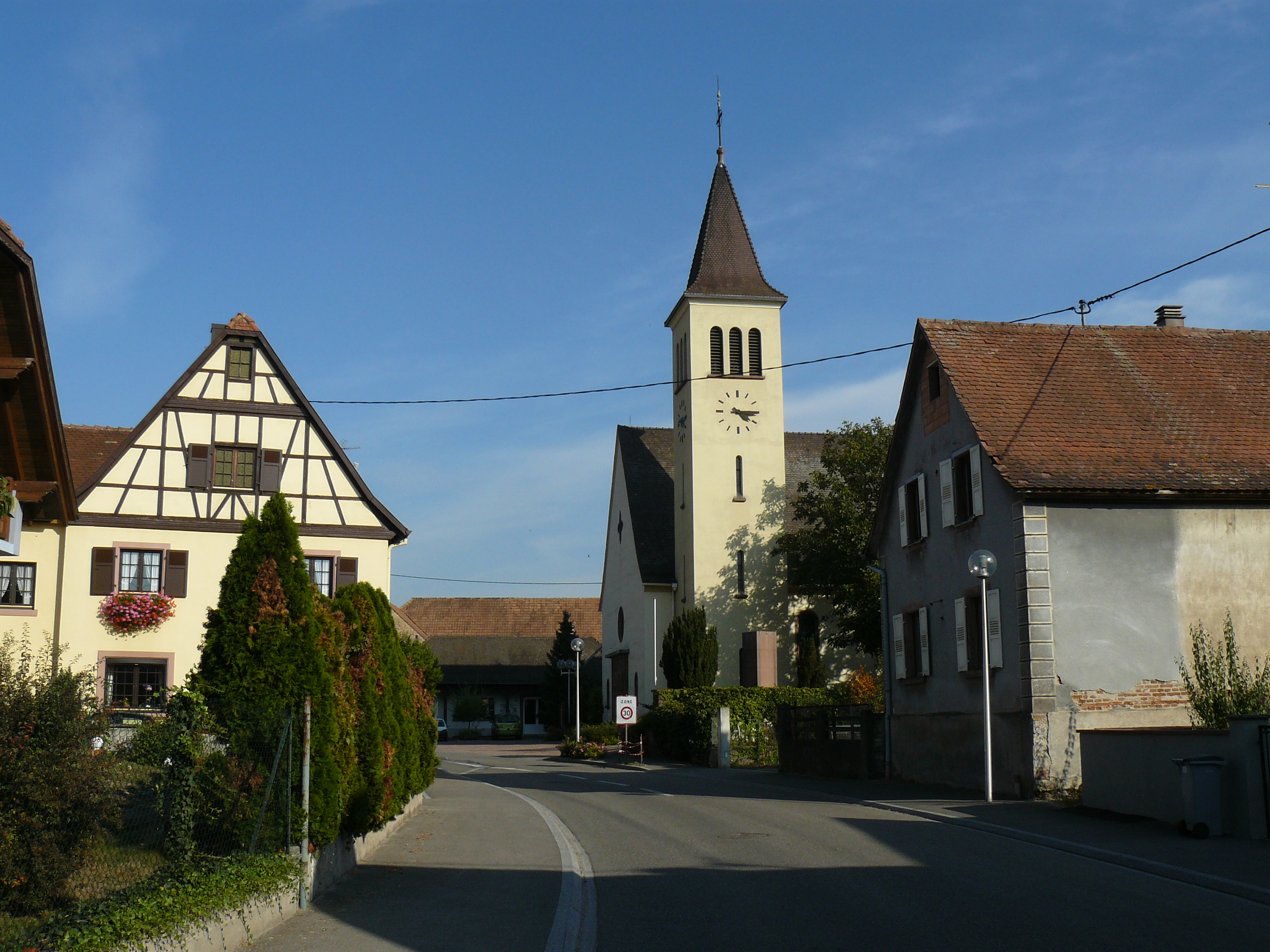
- The church in Witternheim

- Coat of arms
- Location of Witternheim
- Location within France Location within Grand Est
- Coordinates: 48°18′53″N 7°36′46″E
- Country: France
- Region: Grand Est
- Department: Bas-Rhin
- Arrondissement: Sélestat-Erstein
- Canton: Erstein
- Intercommunality: Canton d'Erstein

Government
  - Mayor (2020–2026): Philippe Braun
- Area^{1}: 4.99 km^{2} (1.93 sq mi)
- Elevation: 160 m (520 ft)
- Highest elevation: 163 m (535 ft)
- Lowest elevation: 159 m (522 ft)
- Population (2023): 508
  - Density: 102/km^{2} (264/sq mi)
- Time zone: UTC+01:00 (CET)
  - Summer (DST): UTC+02:00 (CEST)
- INSEE/Postal code: 67545 /67230
- ^{1} French Land Register data, which excludes lakes, ponds, glaciers > 1 km^{2} (0.386 sq mi or 247 acres) and river estuaries.

Witternheim (French pronunciation: [vitəʁnaim]) is a commune in the Bas-Rhin department in Grand Est in north-eastern France.

== Population ==
Historical population
Year	Pop.	±% p.a.
1968	316	—
1975	274	−2.02%
1982	353	+3.69%
1990	386	+1.12%
1999	382	−0.12%
2007	524	+4.03%
2012	517	−0.27%
2017	507	−0.39%
2023	508	+0.03%
Source: INSEE

== See also ==
- Communes of the Bas-Rhin department
