= Sermersheim =

- Commune
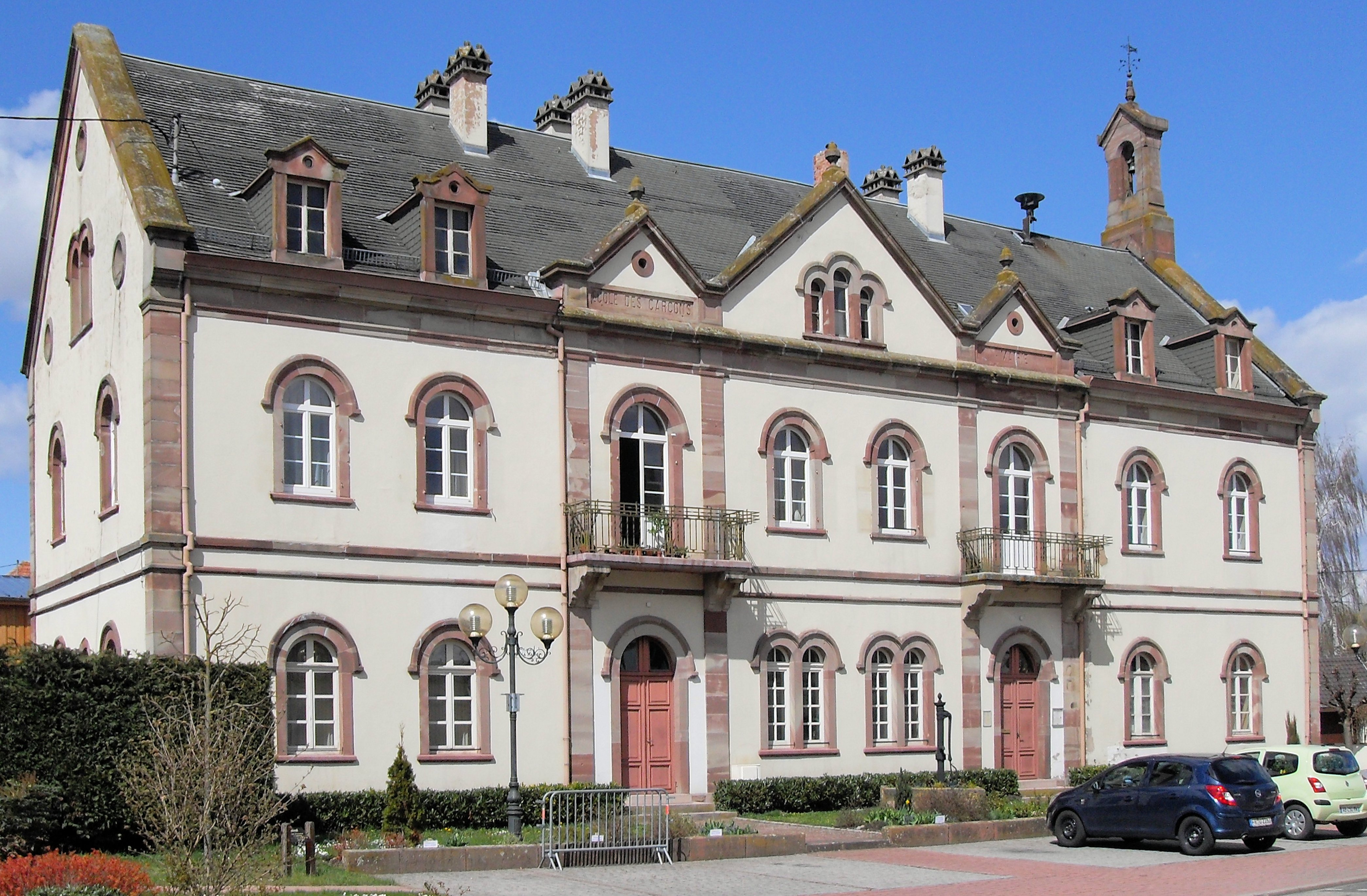
- The town hall in Sermersheim

- Coat of arms
- Location of Sermersheim
- Location within France Location within Grand Est
- Coordinates: 48°20′47″N 7°33′09″E
- Country: France
- Region: Grand Est
- Department: Bas-Rhin
- Arrondissement: Sélestat-Erstein
- Canton: Erstein
- Intercommunality: CC Canton d'Erstein

Government
  - Mayor (2020–2026): Fernand Willmann
- Area^{1}: 10.12 km^{2} (3.91 sq mi)
- Highest elevation: 163 m (535 ft)
- Lowest elevation: 157 m (515 ft)
- Population (2023): 955
  - Density: 94.4/km^{2} (244/sq mi)
- Time zone: UTC+01:00 (CET)
  - Summer (DST): UTC+02:00 (CEST)
- INSEE/Postal code: 67464 /67230
- ^{1} French Land Register data, which excludes lakes, ponds, glaciers > 1 km^{2} (0.386 sq mi or 247 acres) and river estuaries.

Sermersheim is a commune in the Bas-Rhin department in Grand Est in north-eastern France.

== See also ==
- Communes of the Bas-Rhin department
