= Rossfeld =

- Commune
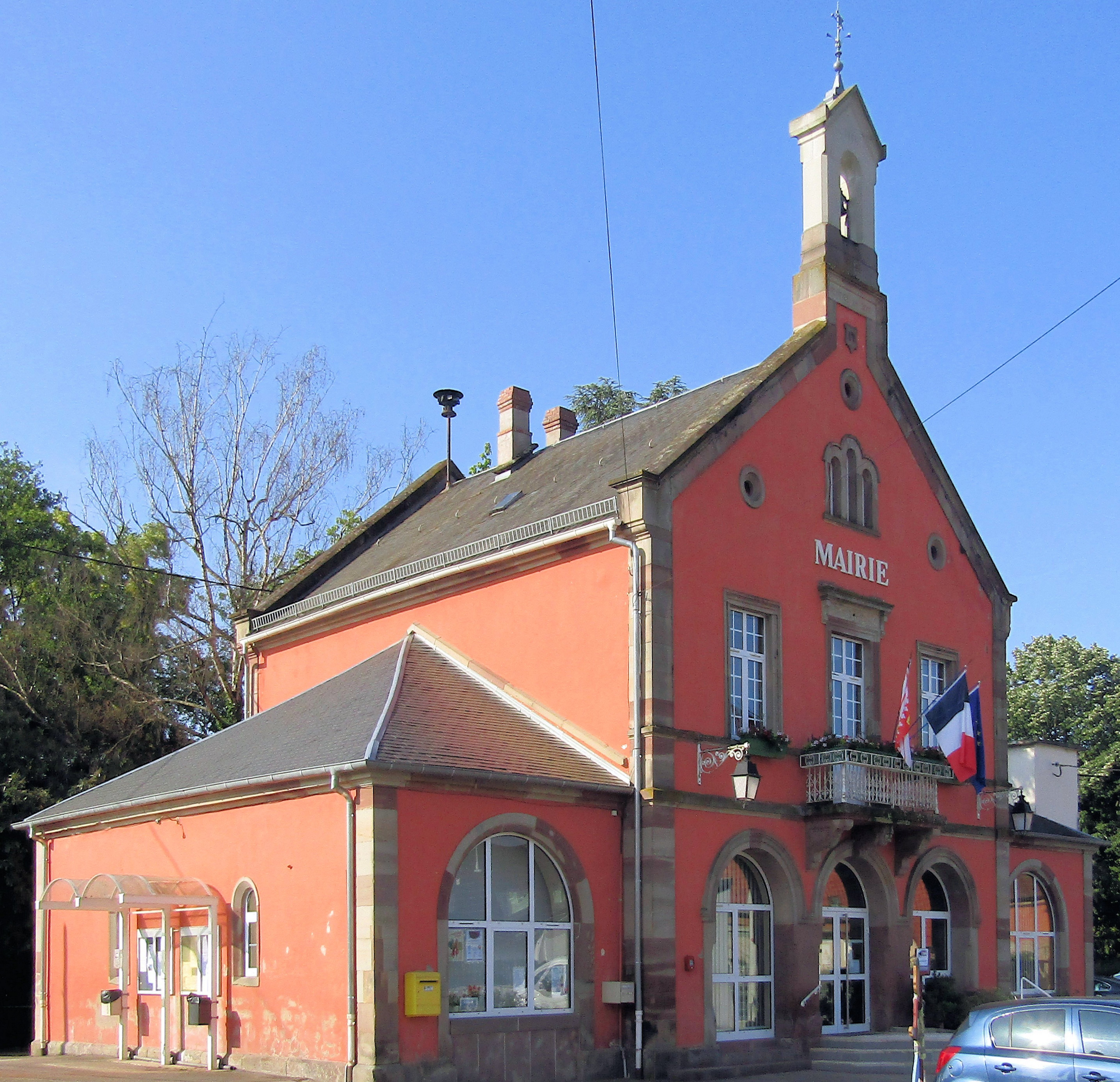
- The town hall in Rossfeld

- Coat of arms
- Location of Rossfeld
- Location within France Location within Grand Est
- Coordinates: 48°20′24″N 7°37′00″E
- Country: France
- Region: Grand Est
- Department: Bas-Rhin
- Arrondissement: Sélestat-Erstein
- Canton: Erstein

Government
  - Mayor (2020–2026): Daniel Koehler
- Area^{1}: 6.15 km^{2} (2.37 sq mi)
- Highest elevation: 162 m (531 ft)
- Lowest elevation: 158 m (518 ft)
- Population (2023): 1,043
  - Density: 170/km^{2} (439/sq mi)
- Time zone: UTC+01:00 (CET)
  - Summer (DST): UTC+02:00 (CEST)
- INSEE/Postal code: 67412 /67230
- ^{1} French Land Register data, which excludes lakes, ponds, glaciers > 1 km^{2} (0.386 sq mi or 247 acres) and river estuaries.

Rossfeld (French pronunciation: [ʁɔsfɛld]) is a commune in the Bas-Rhin department in Grand Est in north-eastern France.

== See also ==
- Communes of the Bas-Rhin department
