= Sand, Bas-Rhin =

Sand
- Commune
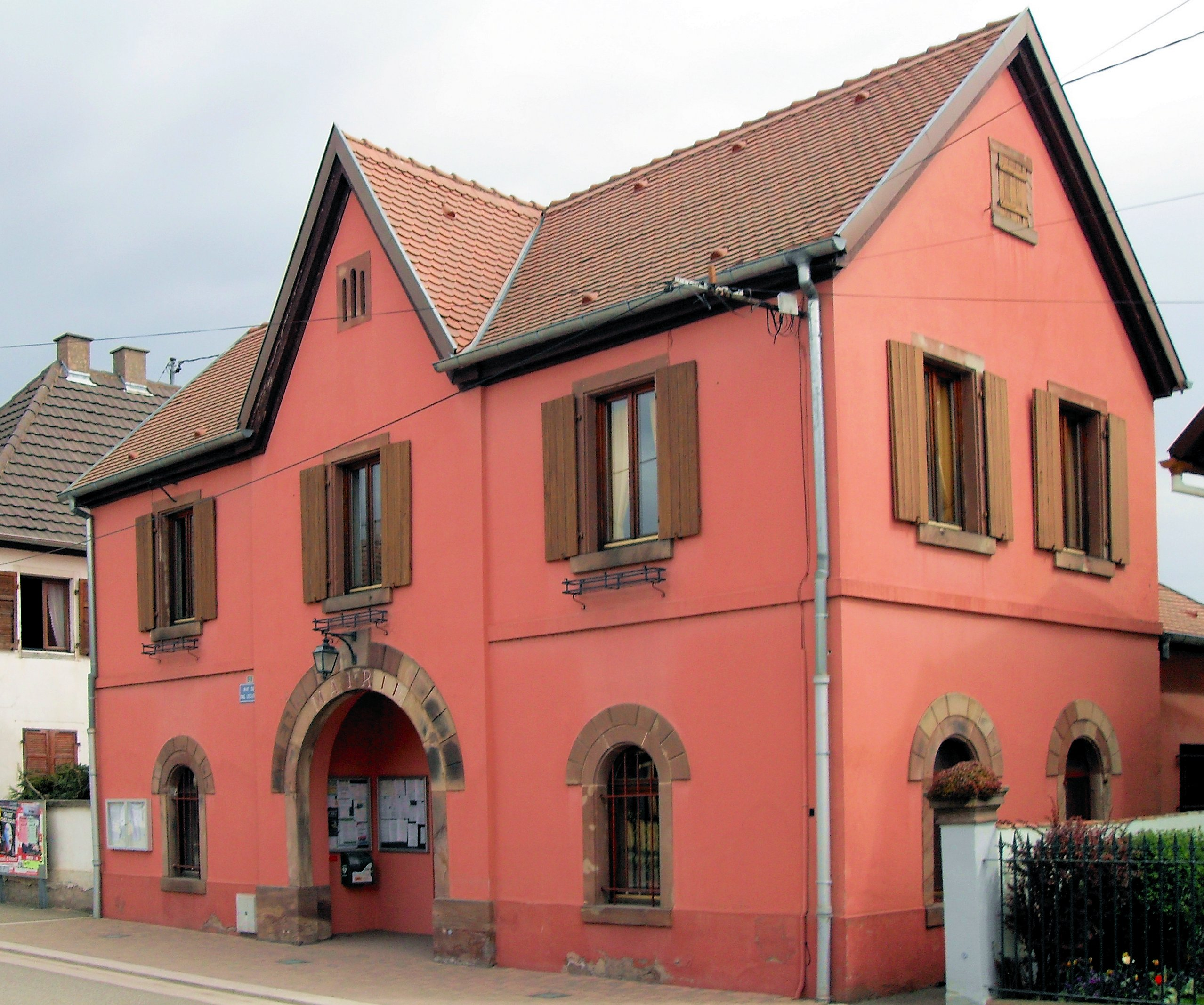
- The town hall in Sand

- Coat of arms
- Location of Sand
- Location within France Location within Grand Est
- Coordinates: 48°23′N 7°37′E
- Country: France
- Region: Grand Est
- Department: Bas-Rhin
- Arrondissement: Sélestat-Erstein
- Canton: Erstein

Government
  - Mayor (2020–2026): Denis Schultz
- Area^{1}: 6.35 km^{2} (2.45 sq mi)
- Highest elevation: 161 m (528 ft)
- Lowest elevation: 154 m (505 ft)
- Population (2023): 1,417
  - Density: 223/km^{2} (578/sq mi)
- Time zone: UTC+01:00 (CET)
  - Summer (DST): UTC+02:00 (CEST)
- INSEE/Postal code: 67433 /67230
- ^{1} French Land Register data, which excludes lakes, ponds, glaciers > 1 km^{2} (0.386 sq mi or 247 acres) and river estuaries.

Sand is a commune in the Bas-Rhin department in Grand Est in north-eastern France.

== See also ==
- Communes of the Bas-Rhin department
