= Friesenheim, Bas-Rhin =

Friesenheim Friesene
- Commune
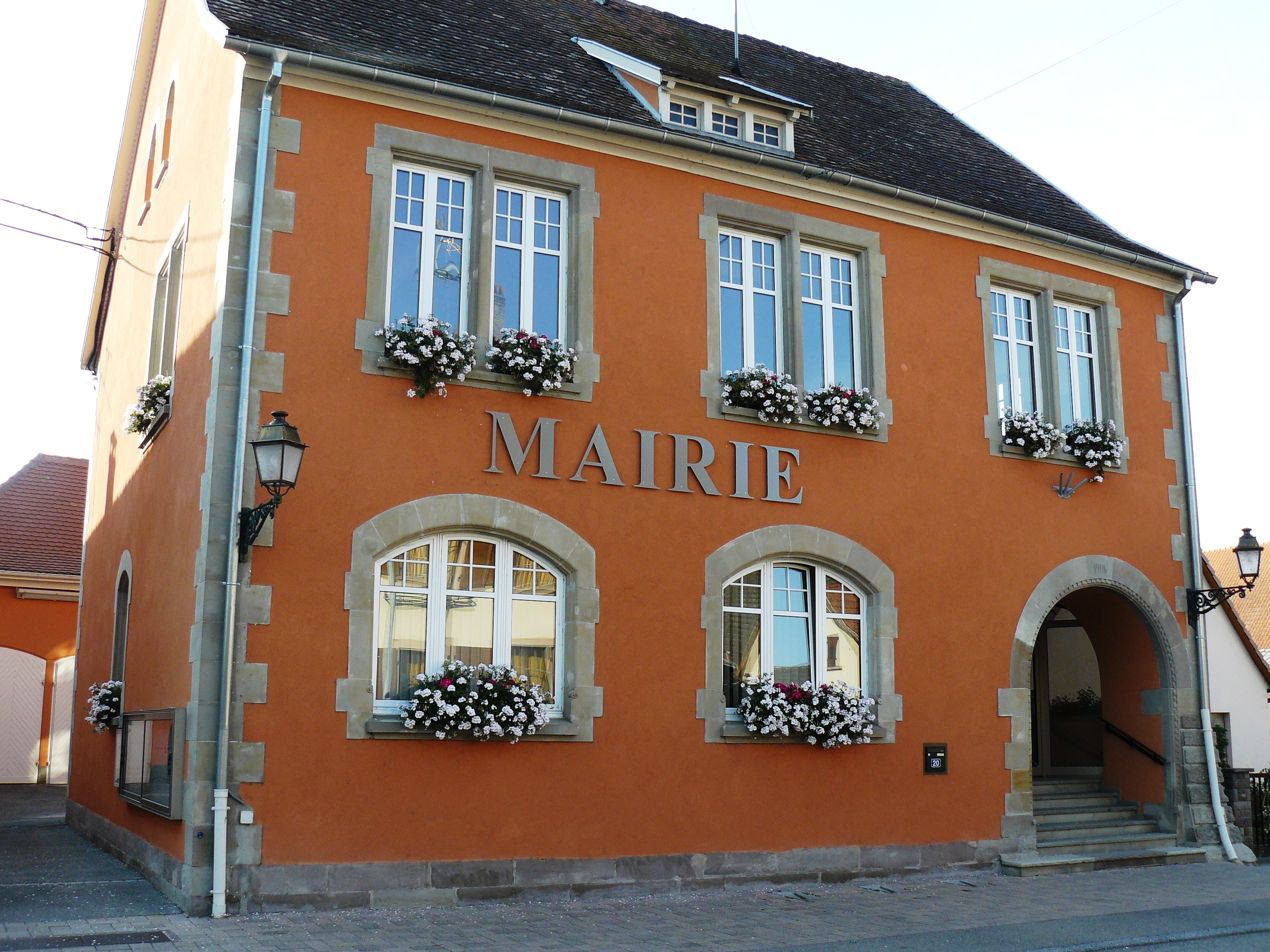
- The town hall in Friesenheim

- Coat of arms
- Location of Friesenheim
- Location within France Location within Grand Est
- Coordinates: 48°18′37″N 7°40′18″E
- Country: France
- Region: Grand Est
- Department: Bas-Rhin
- Arrondissement: Sélestat-Erstein
- Canton: Erstein

Government
  - Mayor (2020–2026): René Eggermann
- Area^{1}: 12.03 km^{2} (4.64 sq mi)
- Elevation: 160 m (520 ft)
- Highest elevation: 163 m (535 ft)
- Lowest elevation: 158 m (518 ft)
- Population (2023): 615
  - Density: 51.1/km^{2} (132/sq mi)
- Time zone: UTC+01:00 (CET)
  - Summer (DST): UTC+02:00 (CEST)
- INSEE/Postal code: 67146 /67860
- ^{1} French Land Register data, which excludes lakes, ponds, glaciers > 1 km^{2} (0.386 sq mi or 247 acres) and river estuaries.

Friesenheim (French pronunciation: [fʁizənaim]; Alsatian: Friesene) is a commune in the Bas-Rhin department in Grand Est in north-eastern France.

== Economy ==
Friesenheim retains a strong agricultural economy. many crops that flourish in the gently warm climate of the alluvial riverside fields surrounding the village.

== See also ==
- Communes of the Bas-Rhin department
