= Bootzheim =

Bootzheim Booze
- Commune
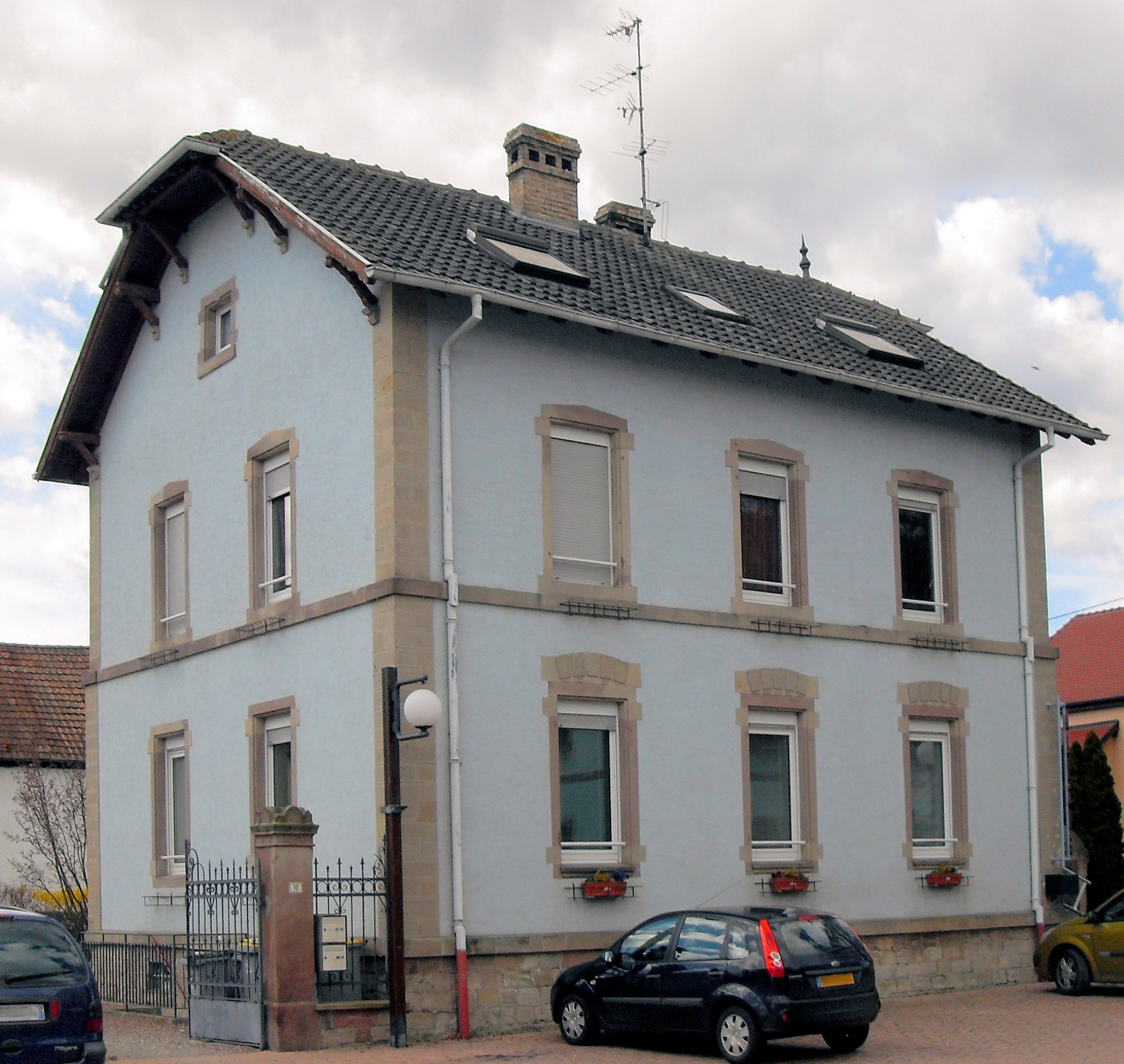
- The town hall in Bootzheim

- Coat of arms
- Location of Bootzheim
- Location within France Location within Grand Est
- Coordinates: 48°11′20″N 7°34′28″E
- Country: France
- Region: Grand Est
- Department: Bas-Rhin
- Arrondissement: Sélestat-Erstein
- Canton: Sélestat
- Intercommunality: Ried de Marckolsheim

Government
  - Mayor (2020–2026): Clément Rohmer
- Area^{1}: 5.91 km^{2} (2.28 sq mi)
- Highest elevation: 178 m (584 ft)
- Lowest elevation: 170 m (560 ft)
- Population (2023): 795
  - Density: 135/km^{2} (348/sq mi)
- Time zone: UTC+01:00 (CET)
  - Summer (DST): UTC+02:00 (CEST)
- INSEE/Postal code: 67056 /67390
- ^{1} French Land Register data, which excludes lakes, ponds, glaciers > 1 km^{2} (0.386 sq mi or 247 acres) and river estuaries.

Bootzheim (French pronunciation: [botsaim]) is a commune in the Bas-Rhin department in Alsace in north-eastern France.

== Geography ==
The village is located a few kilometres to the north of Marckolsheim. Adjacent municipalities are Mackenheim and Artolsheim.

== Economy ==
Employment opportunities in the village are limited. The traditional economic focus of the region is Sélestat some fifteen kilometres (ten miles) to the west. The river crossing of Marckolsheim with its associated locks and hydro-electric power station offer employment opportunities: many low paid seasonal jobs are also provided by the Europa-Park theme park on the other side of the German border nearby.

== Landmarks ==
The Romanesque period church of St Blaise.

== Twin towns ==
- Plazac, Dordogne

== See also ==
- Communes of the Bas-Rhin department
