= Hessenheim =

Hessenheim Hesse
- Commune
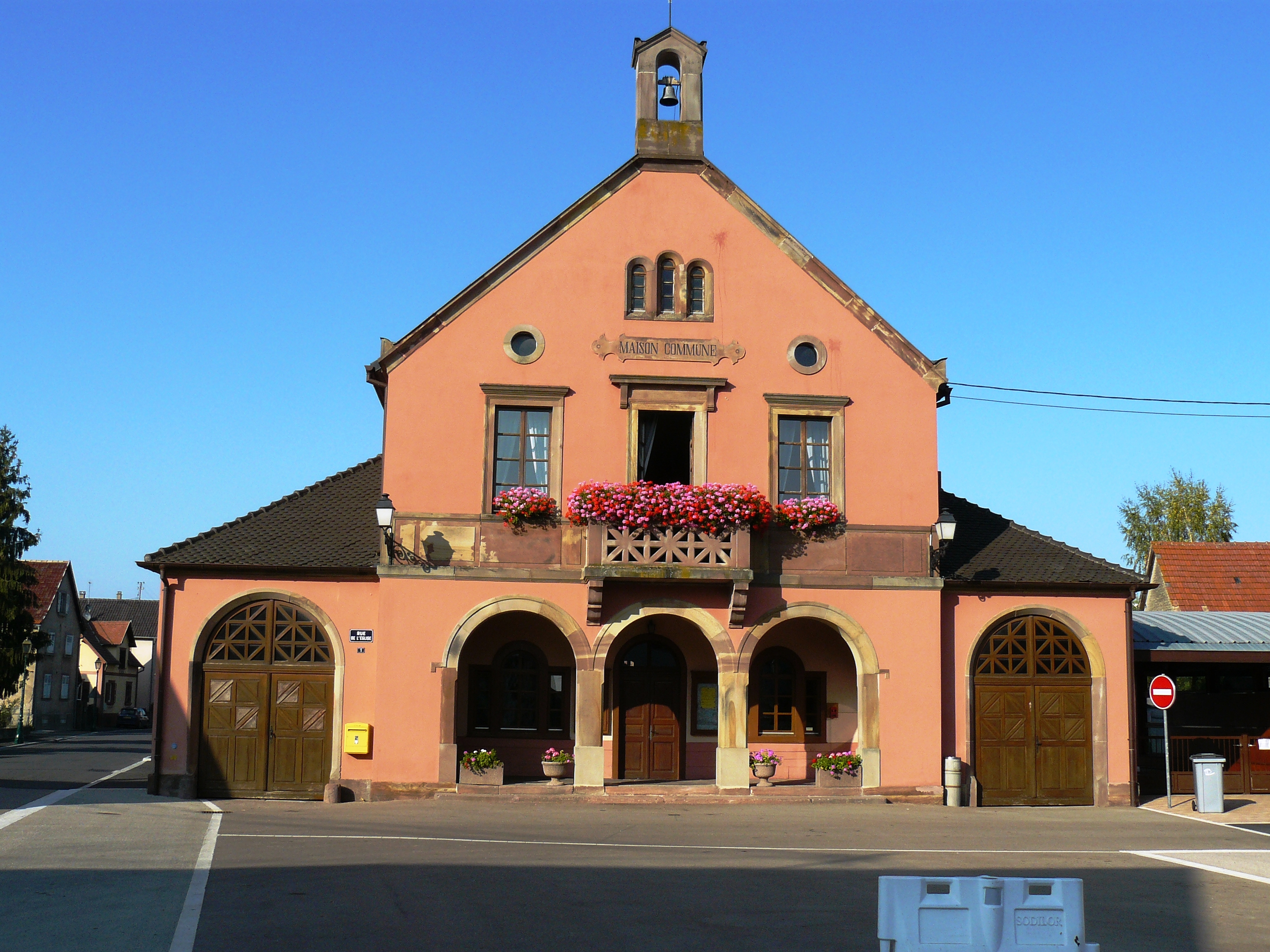
- The community house in Hessenheim

- Coat of arms
- Location of Hessenheim
- Location within France Location within Grand Est
- Coordinates: 48°12′36″N 7°33′06″E
- Country: France
- Region: Grand Est
- Department: Bas-Rhin
- Arrondissement: Sélestat-Erstein
- Canton: Sélestat
- Intercommunality: Ried de Marckolsheim

Government
  - Mayor (2020–2026): Anne-Louise Ulrich
- Area^{1}: 5.21 km^{2} (2.01 sq mi)
- Highest elevation: 177 m (581 ft)
- Lowest elevation: 170 m (560 ft)
- Population (2023): 614
  - Density: 118/km^{2} (305/sq mi)
- Time zone: UTC+01:00 (CET)
  - Summer (DST): UTC+02:00 (CEST)
- INSEE/Postal code: 67195 /67390
- ^{1} French Land Register data, which excludes lakes, ponds, glaciers > 1 km^{2} (0.386 sq mi or 247 acres) and river estuaries.

Hessenheim (French pronunciation: [esənaim]) is a commune in the Bas-Rhin department in Alsace in north-eastern France.

== Geography ==
Hessenheim lies just over twelve kilometres (eight miles) to the southeast of Sélestat. To the south is the commune of Heidolsheim; Marckolsheim is across the canal to the east. On the eastern side, the commune's territory is bordered by the Rhône-Rhine Canal, which here runs parallel with but approximately four kilometres to the west of the river Rhine itself and the German frontier.

The economy is based on agriculture: an important ingredient in that is livestock rearing. To the north of the village is the so-called Hessenheimer Pasture land, though most of this is within the adjacent commune of Mussig.

== See also ==
- Communes of the Bas-Rhin department
