= Heidolsheim =

Heidolsheim Haidelse
- Commune
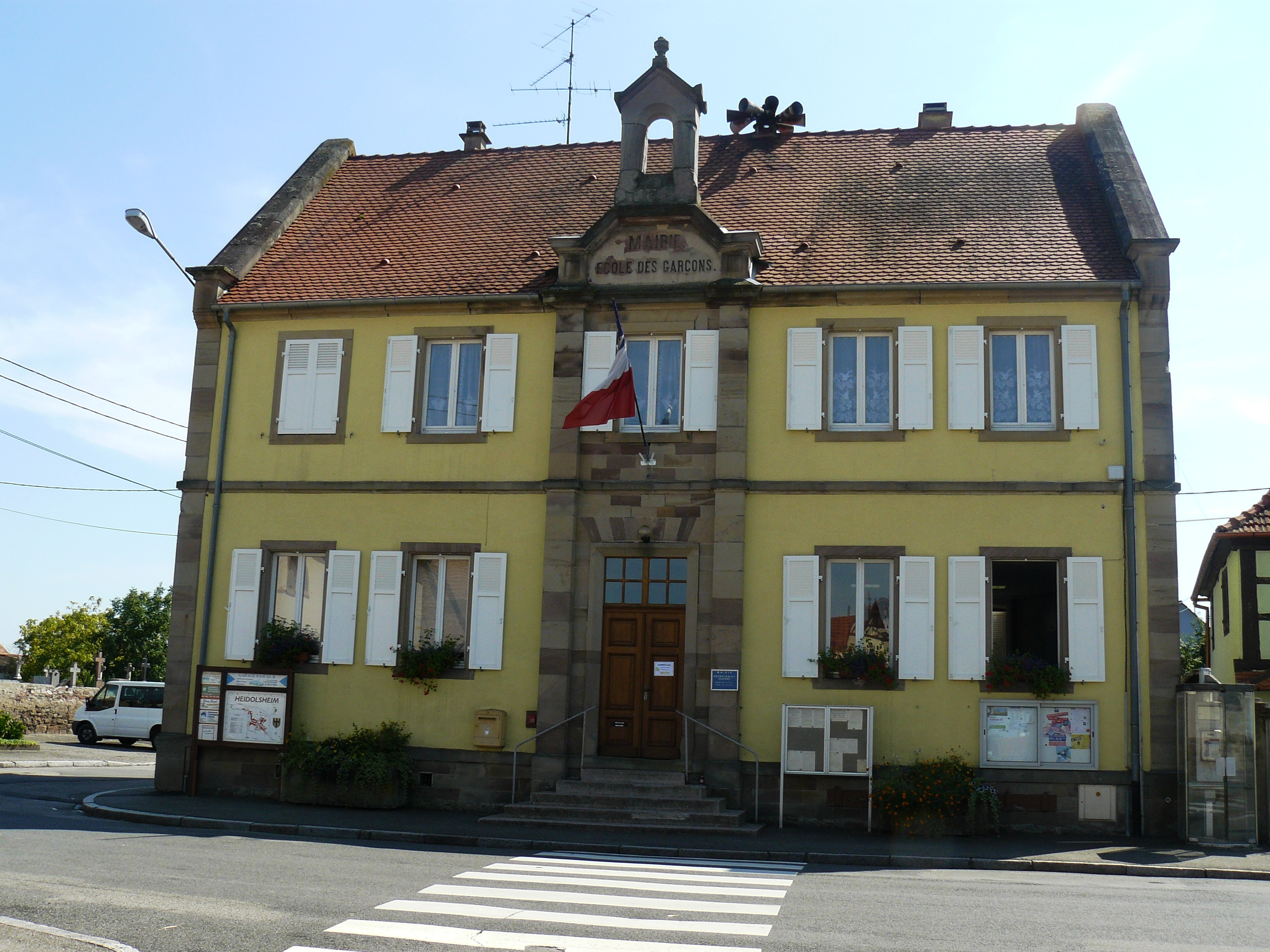
- The town hall in Heidolsheim

- Coat of arms
- Location of Heidolsheim
- Location within France Location within Grand Est
- Coordinates: 48°12′07″N 7°31′00″E
- Country: France
- Region: Grand Est
- Department: Bas-Rhin
- Arrondissement: Sélestat-Erstein
- Canton: Sélestat

Government
  - Mayor (2020–2026): Alex Jehl
- Area^{1}: 5.92 km^{2} (2.29 sq mi)
- Highest elevation: 177 m (581 ft)
- Lowest elevation: 170 m (560 ft)
- Population (2023): 582
  - Density: 98.3/km^{2} (255/sq mi)
- Time zone: UTC+01:00 (CET)
  - Summer (DST): UTC+02:00 (CEST)
- INSEE/Postal code: 67187 /67390
- ^{1} French Land Register data, which excludes lakes, ponds, glaciers > 1 km^{2} (0.386 sq mi or 247 acres) and river estuaries.

Heidolsheim (French pronunciation: [aidɔlsaim]) is a commune in the extreme south of the Bas-Rhin department in Alsace in north-eastern France.

== Geography ==
Heidolsheim is positioned to the south-east of Sélestat, slightly more than half way towards Marckolsheim across the rich alluvial farmland that in eastern Alsace fringes the left bank of the Rhine. Adjacent communes include Hessenheim to the north-east and Ohnenheim to the south.

== History ==
Celtic tombs containing items of prehistoric jewelry such as bronze bracelets have been found nearby.

From the early years of recorded history, the name Hodulsesheimen was used to identify the settlement in 747 and Haidulfesheim in 801.

== Personalities ==
The Anabaptist preacher Jakob Ammann, whose name was adopted by the Amish fellowships, lived in Heidolsheim between 1693 and 1695.

== See also ==
- Communes of the Bas-Rhin department
