= Ebersheim =

Ebersheim may refer to:

- Ebersheim, Bas-Rhin, a French commune in the Bas-Rhin department
- Ebersheim (Mainz), a borough of Mainz
