= European Day =

The term European Day or Europe Day is an annual celebration of peace and unity in Europe.

It can also mean:

- Europe Day
- European Day of Languages
- European Day of Mourning
- European Day of Remembrance for Victims of Stalinism and Nazism
- European Day of Jewish Culture
- European Maritime Day
- European Heritage Day
