= Arrondissement of Sélestat-Erstein =

Coordinates: 48°15′N 7°27′E

Sélestat-Erstein Schlettstàdt-Eerstain
- Arrondissement
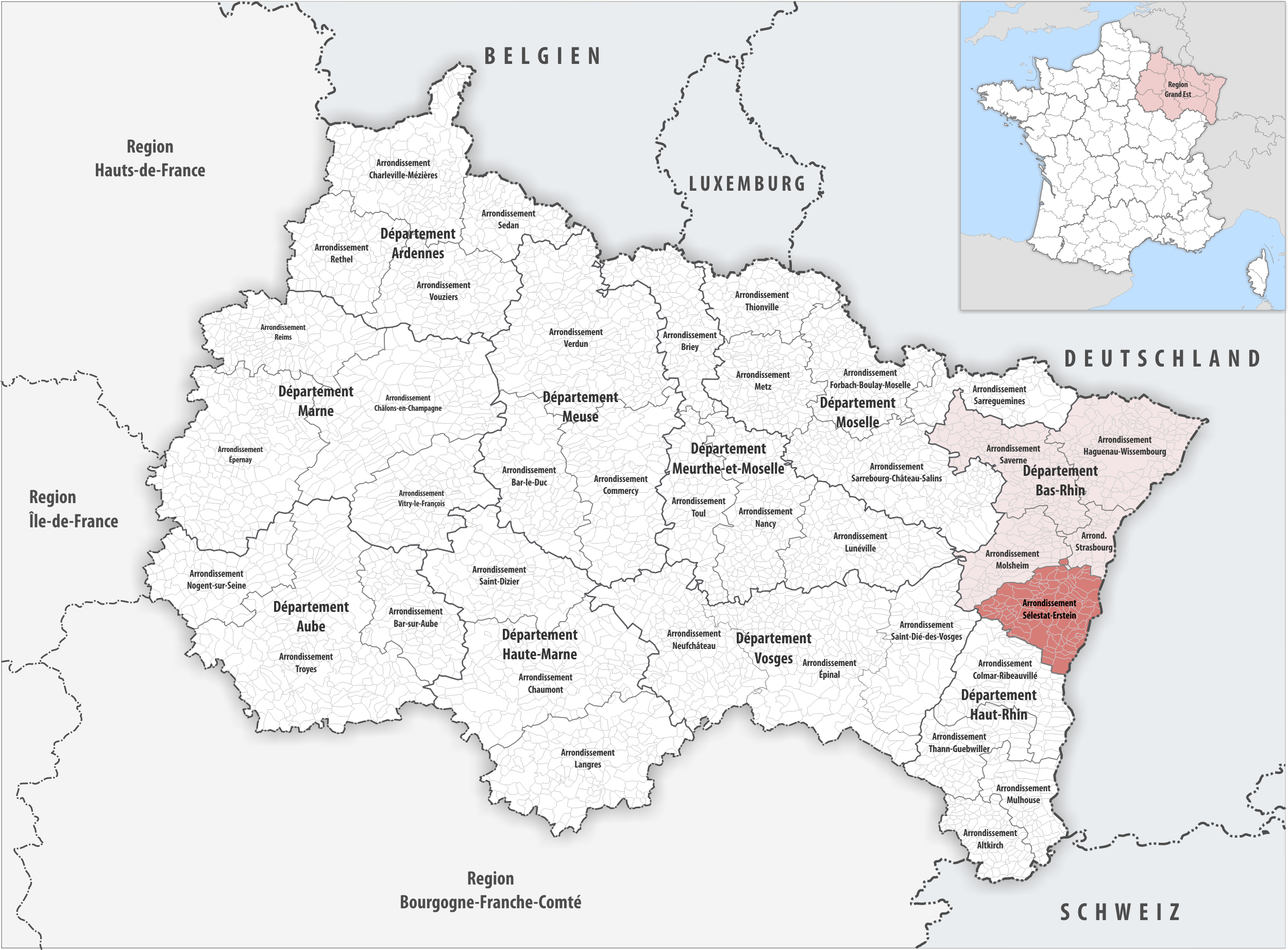
- Location within the region Grand Est
- Country: France
- Region: Grand Est
- Department: Bas-Rhin
- No. of communes: {{{nbcomm}}}
- Area: 980.5 km^{2} (378.6 sq mi)
- Population (2023): 160,993
  - Density: 164.2/km^{2} (425.3/sq mi)
- INSEE code: 675

The arrondissement of Sélestat-Erstein (French: Arrondissement de Sélestat-Erstein; Alsatian: Arrondissement Schlettstàdt-Eerstain) is an arrondissement of France in the Bas-Rhin department in the Grand Est region. It has 101 communes. Its population is 159,650 (2021), and its area is 980.5 km^{2} (378.6 sq mi).

== Composition ==
The communes of the arrondissement of Sélestat-Erstein, and their INSEE codes, are:

1. Albé (67003)
2. Andlau (67010)
3. Artolsheim (67011)
4. Baldenheim (67019)
5. Barr (67021)
6. Bassemberg (67022)
7. Benfeld (67028)
8. Bernardswiller (67031)
9. Bernardvillé (67032)
10. Bindernheim (67040)
11. Blienschwiller (67051)
12. Bœsenbiesen (67053)
13. Bolsenheim (67054)
14. Boofzheim (67055)
15. Bootzheim (67056)
16. Bourgheim (67060)
17. Breitenau (67062)
18. Breitenbach (67063)
19. Châtenois (67073)
20. Dambach-la-Ville (67084)
21. Daubensand (67086)
22. Diebolsheim (67090)
23. Dieffenbach-au-Val (67092)
24. Dieffenthal (67094)
25. Ebersheim (67115)
26. Ebersmunster (67116)
27. Eichhoffen (67120)
28. Elsenheim (67121)
29. Epfig (67125)
30. Erstein (67130)
31. Fouchy (67143)
32. Friesenheim (67146)
33. Gerstheim (67154)
34. Gertwiller (67155)
35. Goxwiller (67164)
36. Heidolsheim (67187)
37. Heiligenstein (67189)
38. Herbsheim (67192)
39. Hessenheim (67195)
40. Hilsenheim (67196)
41. Hindisheim (67197)
42. Hipsheim (67200)
43. Le Hohwald (67210)
44. Huttenheim (67216)
45. Ichtratzheim (67217)
46. Innenheim (67223)
47. Itterswiller (67227)
48. Kertzfeld (67233)
49. Kintzheim (67239)
50. Kogenheim (67246)
51. Krautergersheim (67248)
52. Lalaye (67255)
53. Limersheim (67266)
54. Mackenheim (67277)
55. Maisonsgoutte (67280)
56. Marckolsheim (67281)
57. Matzenheim (67285)
58. Meistratzheim (67286)
59. Mittelbergheim (67295)
60. Mussig (67310)
61. Muttersholtz (67311)
62. Neubois (67317)
63. Neuve-Église (67320)
64. Niedernai (67329)
65. Nordhouse (67336)
66. Nothalten (67337)
67. Obenheim (67338)
68. Obernai (67348)
69. Ohnenheim (67360)
70. Orschwiller (67362)
71. Osthouse (67364)
72. Reichsfeld (67387)
73. Rhinau (67397)
74. Richtolsheim (67398)
75. Rossfeld (67412)
76. Saasenheim (67422)
77. Saint-Martin (67426)
78. Saint-Maurice (67427)
79. Saint-Pierre (67429)
80. Saint-Pierre-Bois (67430)
81. Sand (67433)
82. Schaeffersheim (67438)
83. Scherwiller (67445)
84. Schœnau (67453)
85. Schwobsheim (67461)
86. Sélestat (67462)
87. Sermersheim (67464)
88. Steige (67477)
89. Stotzheim (67481)
90. Sundhouse (67486)
91. Thanvillé (67490)
92. Triembach-au-Val (67493)
93. Urbeis (67499)
94. Uttenheim (67501)
95. Valff (67504)
96. La Vancelle (67505)
97. Villé (67507)
98. Westhouse (67526)
99. Witternheim (67545)
100. Wittisheim (67547)
101. Zellwiller (67557)

== History ==
The arrondissement of Sélestat-Erstein was created in 1974 by the merger of the former arrondissements of Erstein and Sélestat.

As a result of the reorganisation of the cantons of France which came into effect in 2015, the borders of the cantons are no longer related to the borders of the arrondissements. The cantons of the arrondissement of Sélestat-Erstein were, as of January 2015:

1. Barr
2. Benfeld
3. Erstein
4. Marckolsheim
5. Obernai
6. Sélestat
7. Villé
