= European Day of Jewish Culture =

European Jewish Culture Celebration Event

The European Day of Jewish Culture is an event celebrated in several countries in Europe. Its aim is to organize activities related to Jewish culture and promote them to a wide public in order to highlight the cultural and historical heritage of the Jewish people. The activities are coordinated by the European Association for the Preservation and Promotion of Jewish Culture (AEPJ), the European Council of Jewish Communities, B'nai B'rith Europe and the Network of Jewish Quarters in Spain. Events are organised to raise awareness about the cultures, traditions and lifestyles of different communities living in the same country or city, helping people to understand the "other", and thus, strengthening communication and dialogue between cultures.

== History ==
The annual event was initiated in 1996 by the B'nai Brith of Strasbourg in the French département Bas-Rhin together with the local Agency for development of tourism. It is now observed by twenty-seven European countries including Turkey and Ukraine. The original aim of the day was to permit access to, and ultimately restore, long abandoned synagogues of architectural value like those of Wolfisheim, Westhoffen, Pfaffenhoffen, Struth, Diemeringen, Ingwiller or Mackenheim. In 2000, a partnership was created between B'nai B'rith and the other organizations that currently participate in organizing the day's events.

== Activities ==
On this day exhibitions, concerts, panel discussions, lectures and excursions are organized in many European countries. Topics such as Jewish neighborhoods, the coexistence of cultures, exhibitions on sculpture, painting, print, music and Jewish religious objects are discussed.

== Celebration Days ==
- 1999: September 5
- 2000: September 6
- 2001: September 6 - "Judaism and the Arts"
- 2002: September 6 - "Jewish Calendar and celebrations in Art, Music and Gastronomy"
- 2003: September 6 - "Pesach"
- 2004: September 6 - "Judaism and Education"
- 2005: September 6 - "The Heritage of Jewish Cooking"
- 2006: September 6 - "The European Routes of Jewish Heritage"
- 2007: September 8 - "Testimonials"
- 2008: September 4 - "Jewish Music"
- 2009: September 6 - "Jewish Celebrations and Traditions"
- 2010: September 5–15 - "Art in Judaism"
- 2014: September 14 - "Women in Judaism"
- 2015: September 6 - "Bridges"
- 2016: September 4 - "Jewish languages"
- 2017: September 3 - "Diaspora"
- 2018: September 2 - "Storytelling"
- 2019: September 1 - "Jubilee"
- 2020: September 6 - "Journey
- 2021: September 5 - "Dialog"
- 2022: September 4 - "Renewal"
- 2023: September 3 - "Memory"
- 2024: September 1: '"Family"
- 2025: September 7: "People of the Book"
