= Scherwiller =

- Commune
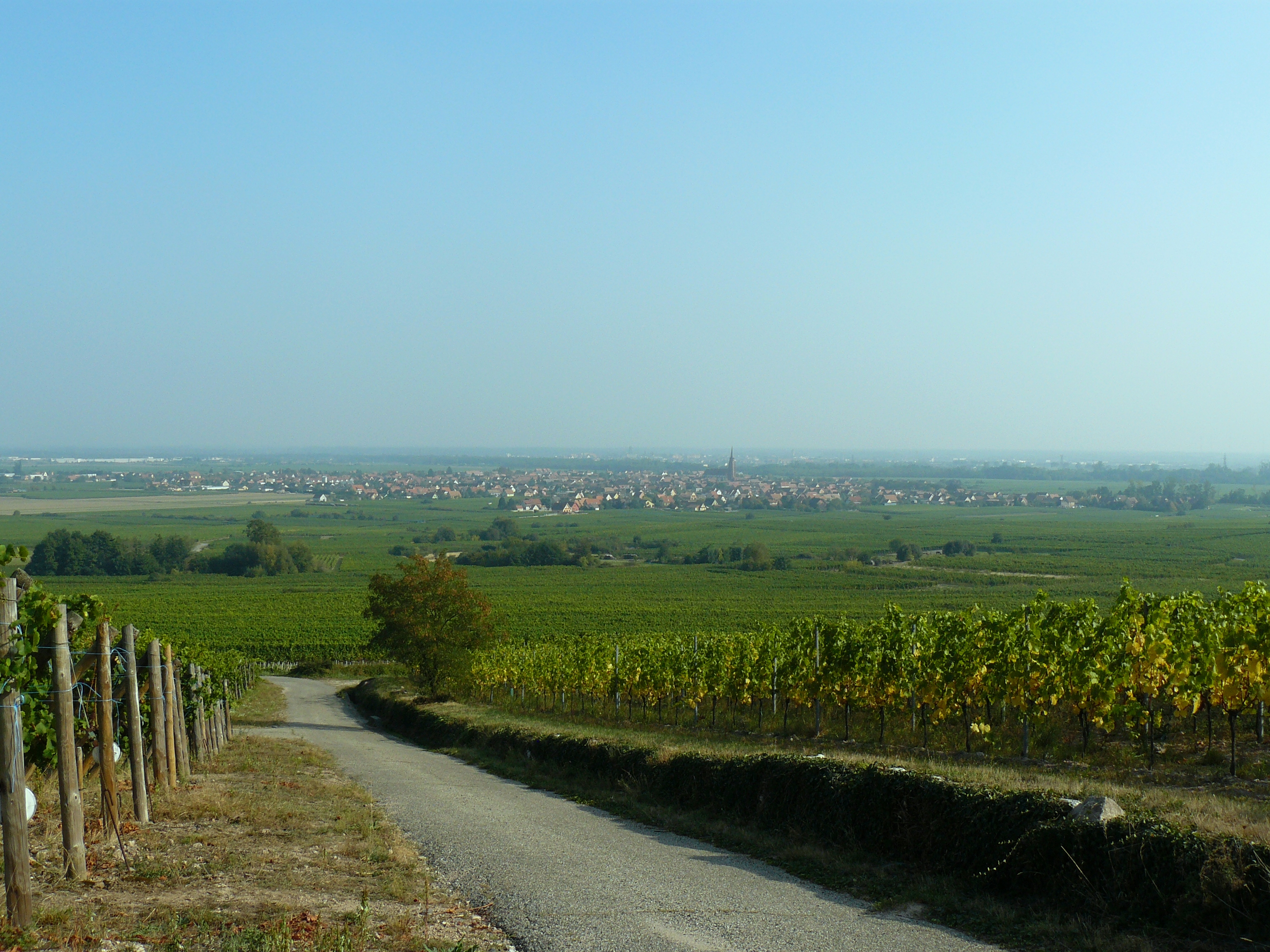
- The village viewed from the vineyard

- Coat of arms
- Location of Scherwiller
- Location within France Location within Grand Est
- Coordinates: 48°17′18″N 7°25′07″E
- Country: France
- Region: Grand Est
- Department: Bas-Rhin
- Arrondissement: Sélestat-Erstein
- Canton: Sélestat
- Intercommunality: Sélestat

Government
  - Mayor (2020–2026): Olivier Sohler
- Area^{1}: 18.08 km^{2} (6.98 sq mi)
- Highest elevation: 532 m (1,745 ft)
- Lowest elevation: 168 m (551 ft)
- Population (2023): 3,099
  - Density: 171.4/km^{2} (443.9/sq mi)
- Time zone: UTC+01:00 (CET)
  - Summer (DST): UTC+02:00 (CEST)
- INSEE/Postal code: 67445 /67750
- ^{1} French Land Register data, which excludes lakes, ponds, glaciers > 1 km^{2} (0.386 sq mi or 247 acres) and river estuaries.

Scherwiller (French pronunciation: [ʃɛʁvilɛʁ]; German: Scherweiler) is a commune in the Bas-Rhin department in Alsace in northeastern France.

== Geography ==
The town is situated on the wine route at an altitude of 185 meters (607 ft). Scherwiller is located at the mouth of the valleys of Sainte-Marie-aux-Mines to the east, and Villé at north, 5 kilometers (3.1 mi) west of Sélestat, Center Alsace, and 3.5 km (2.2 mi) south of Châtenois.

== Population ==
Historical population
Year	Pop.	±% p.a.
1968	2,300	—
1975	2,368	+0.42%
1982	2,382	+0.08%
1990	2,278	−0.56%
1999	2,614	+1.54%
2007	3,009	+1.77%
2012	3,136	+0.83%
2017	3,195	+0.37%
2023	3,099	−0.51%
Source: INSEE

Residents are referred to as Scherwillerois in French.

== History ==
The name was mentioned early in the form Sceravillare or Scerwiller, designating a hamlet on the edge of the Scheer, the former name of the Aubach River, which runs through the village. Scherwiller is located at the intersection of two Roman roads: on an east–west axis the salt road from the Villé Valley, and on a north–south axis a Roman road, two milestones of which are still identifiable in the town itself. This explains the presence of Ortenbourg Castle during the 12th century.

== Economy ==
Located in the heart of Alsace, the village is built in the middle of a 300-hectare (740-acre) vineyard, extending along the slopes downwards from Ortenbourg and Ramstein castles.

== See also ==
- Communes of the Bas-Rhin department
