= Richtolsheim =

Richtolsheim Rìchtelse
- Commune
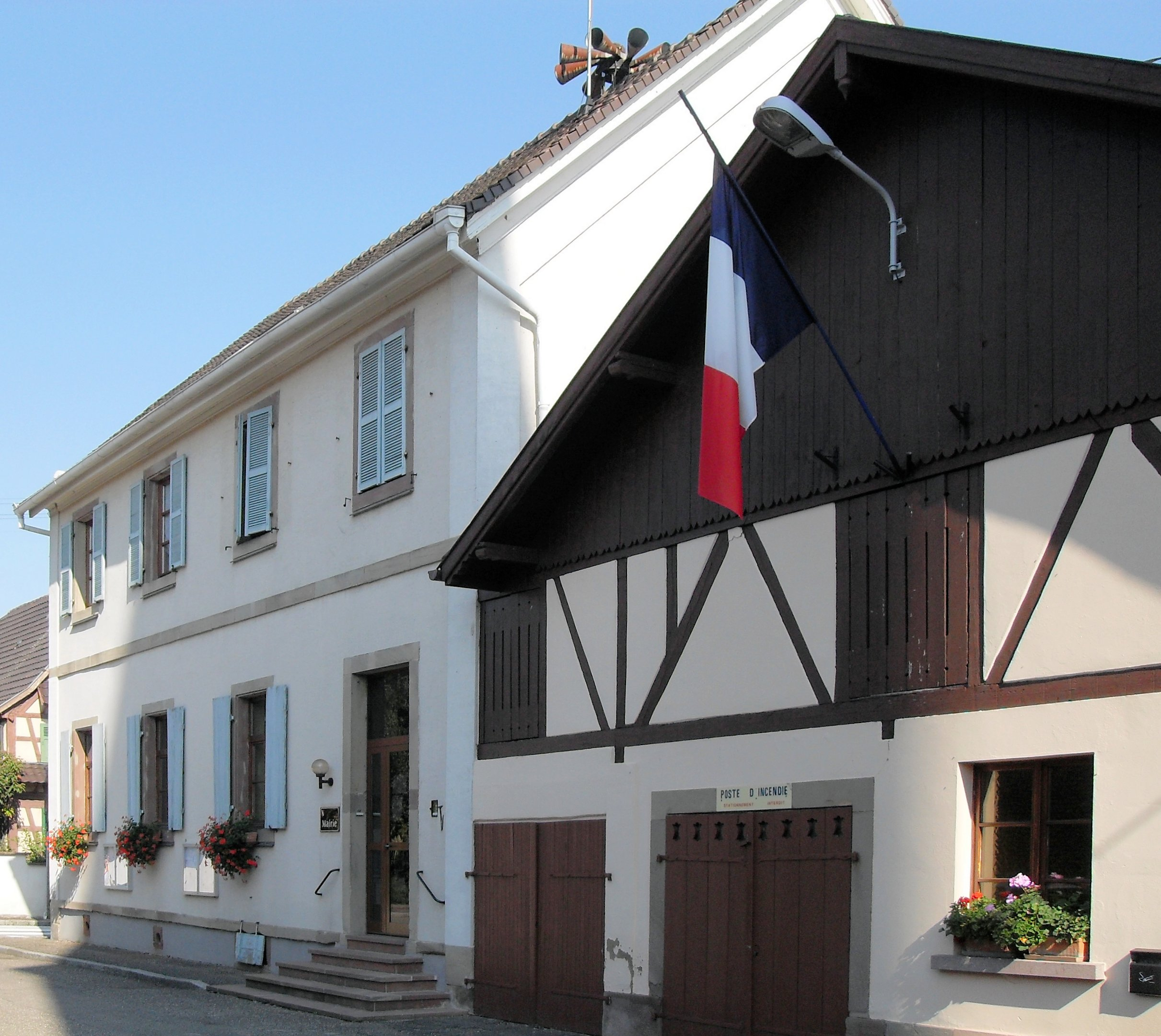
- The town hall in Richtolsheim

- Coat of arms
- Location of Richtolsheim
- Location within France Location within Grand Est
- Coordinates: 48°13′34″N 7°35′44″E
- Country: France
- Region: Grand Est
- Department: Bas-Rhin
- Arrondissement: Sélestat-Erstein
- Canton: Sélestat
- Intercommunality: Ried de Marckolsheim

Government
  - Mayor (2020–2026): Rémy Taglang
- Area^{1}: 3.63 km^{2} (1.40 sq mi)
- Highest elevation: 172 m (564 ft)
- Lowest elevation: 168 m (551 ft)
- Population (2023): 383
  - Density: 106/km^{2} (273/sq mi)
- Time zone: UTC+01:00 (CET)
  - Summer (DST): UTC+02:00 (CEST)
- INSEE/Postal code: 67398 /67390
- ^{1} French Land Register data, which excludes lakes, ponds, glaciers > 1 km^{2} (0.386 sq mi or 247 acres) and river estuaries.

Richtolsheim (French pronunciation: [ʁiʃtɔlsaim]) is a commune in the Bas-Rhin department in Alsace in north-eastern France.

== See also ==
- Communes of the Bas-Rhin department
