= Bœsenbiesen =

Bœsenbiesen Biese
- Commune
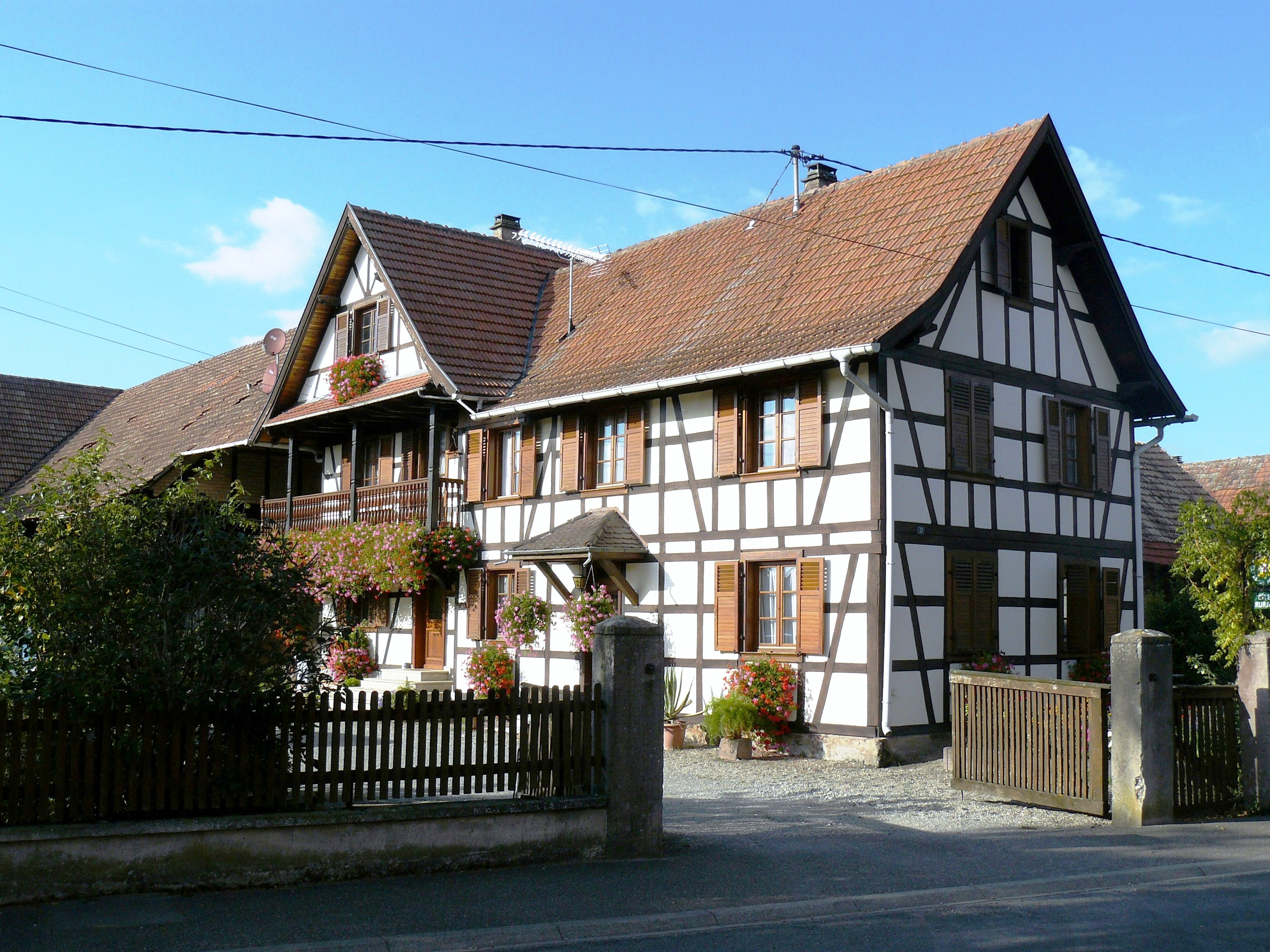
- The 1805 farm in Bœsenbiesen

- Coat of arms
- Location of Bœsenbiesen
- Location within France Location within Grand Est
- Coordinates: 48°13′44″N 7°33′54″E
- Country: France
- Region: Grand Est
- Department: Bas-Rhin
- Arrondissement: Sélestat-Erstein
- Canton: Sélestat
- Intercommunality: Ried de Marckolsheim

Government
  - Mayor (2020–2026): Mathieu Lauffenburger
- Area^{1}: 3.81 km^{2} (1.47 sq mi)
- Highest elevation: 173 m (568 ft)
- Lowest elevation: 168 m (551 ft)
- Population (2023): 314
  - Density: 82.4/km^{2} (213/sq mi)
- Time zone: UTC+01:00 (CET)
  - Summer (DST): UTC+02:00 (CEST)
- INSEE/Postal code: 67053 /67390
- ^{1} French Land Register data, which excludes lakes, ponds, glaciers > 1 km^{2} (0.386 sq mi or 247 acres) and river estuaries.

Bœsenbiesen (French pronunciation: [bøzənbizən]; German: Bösenbiesen; Alsatian: Biese) is a commune in the Bas-Rhin department in Grand Est in north-eastern France.

== Population ==
Historical population

Year	Pop.	±% p.a.
1793	205	—
1821	226	+0.35%
1846	283	+0.90%
1871	305	+0.30%
1900	276	−0.34%
1926	222	−0.83%
1946	203	−0.45%
1962	222	+0.56%
1968	227	+0.37%

Year	Pop.	±% p.a.
1975	229	+0.13%
1982	237	+0.49%
1990	239	+0.11%
1999	272	+1.45%
2007	299	+1.19%
2012	303	+0.27%
2017	321	+1.16%
2023	314	−0.37%

Source: EHESS and INSEE

== See also ==
- Communes of the Bas-Rhin department
