= Artolsheim =

Artolsheim Àrtelse
- Commune
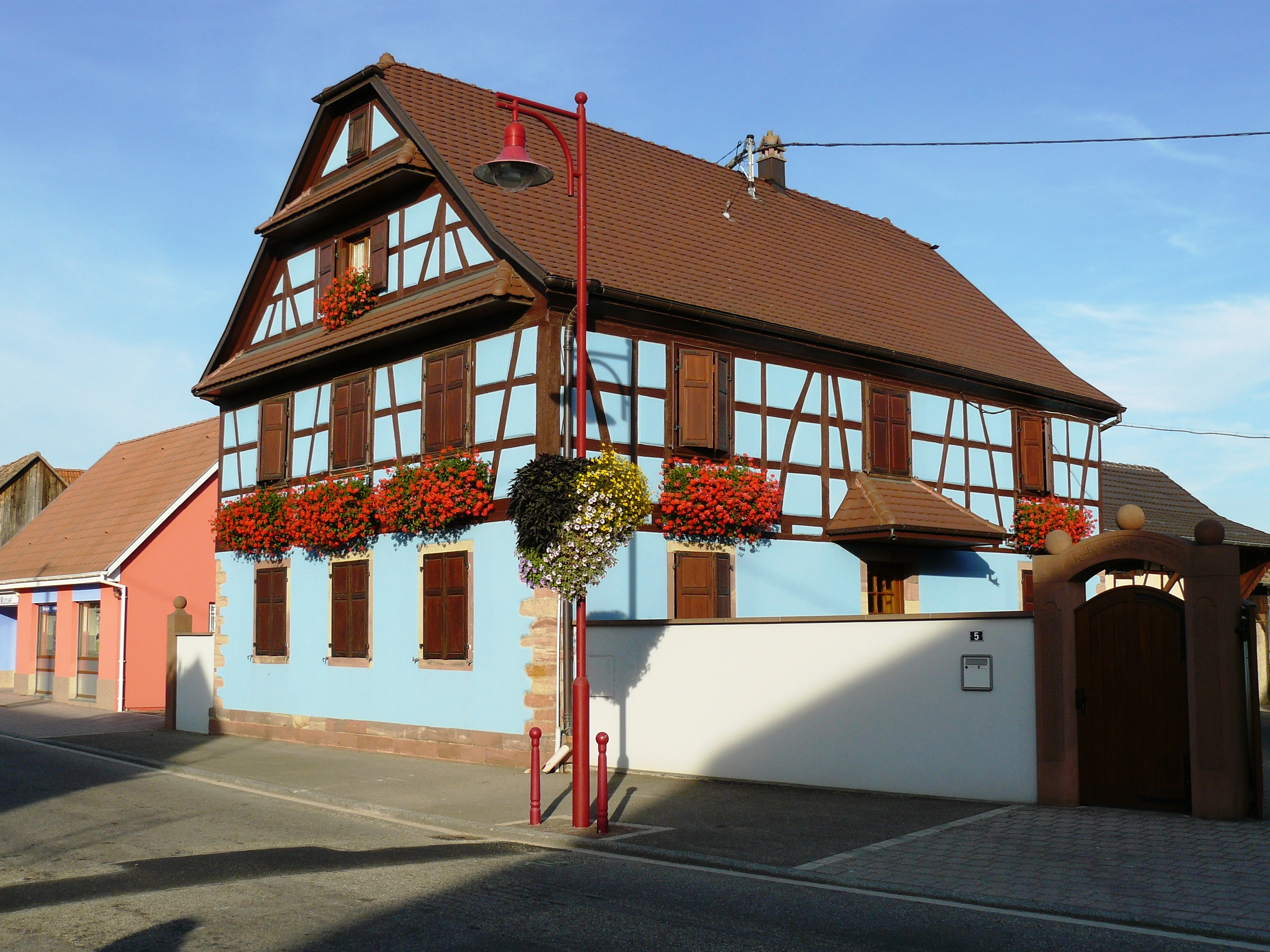
- A half-timbered house in Artolsheim

- Coat of arms
- Location of Artolsheim
- Location within France Location within Grand Est
- Coordinates: 48°12′33″N 7°34′26″E
- Country: France
- Region: Grand Est
- Department: Bas-Rhin
- Arrondissement: Sélestat-Erstein
- Canton: Sélestat
- Intercommunality: CC Ried Marckolsheim

Government
  - Mayor (2023–2026): Jean-Michel Voegeli
- Area^{1}: 11.25 km^{2} (4.34 sq mi)
- Highest elevation: 174 m (571 ft)
- Lowest elevation: 168 m (551 ft)
- Population (2023): 1,005
  - Density: 89.33/km^{2} (231.4/sq mi)
- Time zone: UTC+01:00 (CET)
  - Summer (DST): UTC+02:00 (CEST)
- INSEE/Postal code: 67011 /67390
- ^{1} French Land Register data, which excludes lakes, ponds, glaciers > 1 km^{2} (0.386 sq mi or 247 acres) and river estuaries.

Artolsheim (French pronunciation: [aʁtɔlsaim]) is a commune in the Bas-Rhin department in Alsace in northeastern France.

== Geography ==
Artolsheim has the distinction of being further from the sea than any other place in France. The Gulf of Genoa and the mouth of the river Scheldt are both 430 km (267 mi) away.

== Population ==
Historical population
Year	Pop.	±% p.a.
1968	705	—
1975	630	−1.59%
1982	649	+0.43%
1990	643	−0.12%
1999	728	+1.39%
2007	867	+2.21%
2012	933	+1.48%
2017	996	+1.32%
2023	1,005	+0.15%
Source: INSEE

== Economy ==
Employment opportunities in the village are limited. The traditional economic focus of the region is Sélestat some fifteen kilometres (ten miles) to the west. The river crossing of Marckolsheim with its associated locks and hydro-electric power station offer employment opportunities: many mostly low-paid seasonal jobs are also provided by the Europa-Park 'theme park'.

== See also ==
- Communes of the Bas-Rhin department
