= Dieffenthal =

Dieffenthal Diefedàl
- Commune
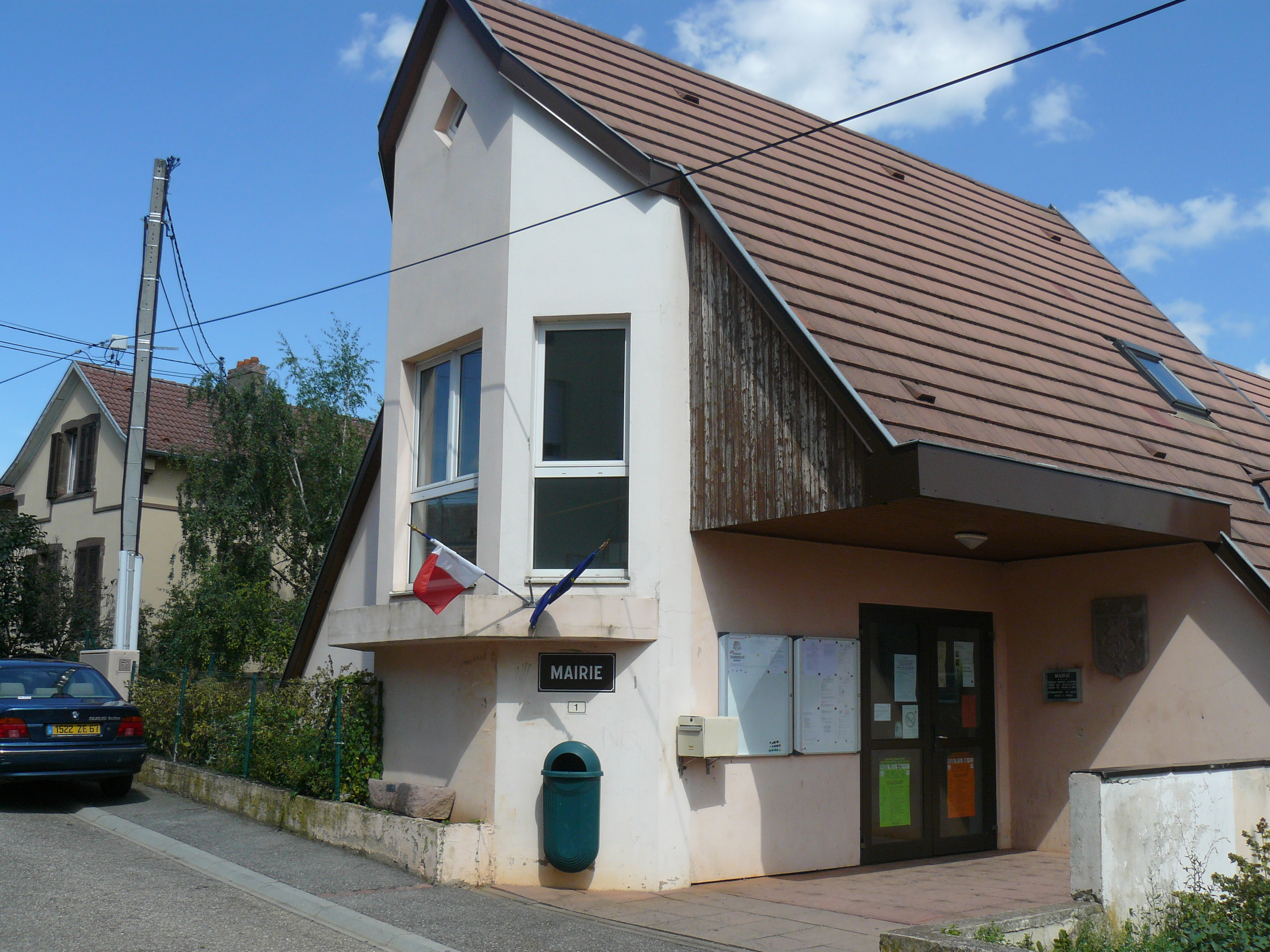
- Town hall, Dieffenthal

- Coat of arms
- Location of Dieffenthal
- Location within France Location within Grand Est
- Coordinates: 48°18′38″N 7°25′13″E
- Country: France
- Region: Grand Est
- Department: Bas-Rhin
- Arrondissement: Sélestat-Erstein
- Canton: Sélestat
- Intercommunality: Sélestat

Government
  - Mayor (2020–2026): Charles Andrea
- Area^{1}: 1.51 km^{2} (0.58 sq mi)
- Highest elevation: 523 m (1,716 ft)
- Lowest elevation: 188 m (617 ft)
- Population (2023): 282
  - Density: 187/km^{2} (484/sq mi)
- Time zone: UTC+01:00 (CET)
  - Summer (DST): UTC+02:00 (CEST)
- INSEE/Postal code: 67094 /67650
- ^{1} French Land Register data, which excludes lakes, ponds, glaciers > 1 km^{2} (0.386 sq mi or 247 acres) and river estuaries.

Dieffenthal (French pronunciation: [difəntal]; German: Dieffental) is a commune in the Bas-Rhin department in Alsace in north-eastern France.

== See also ==
- Communes of the Bas-Rhin department
