= Plazac =

- Commune
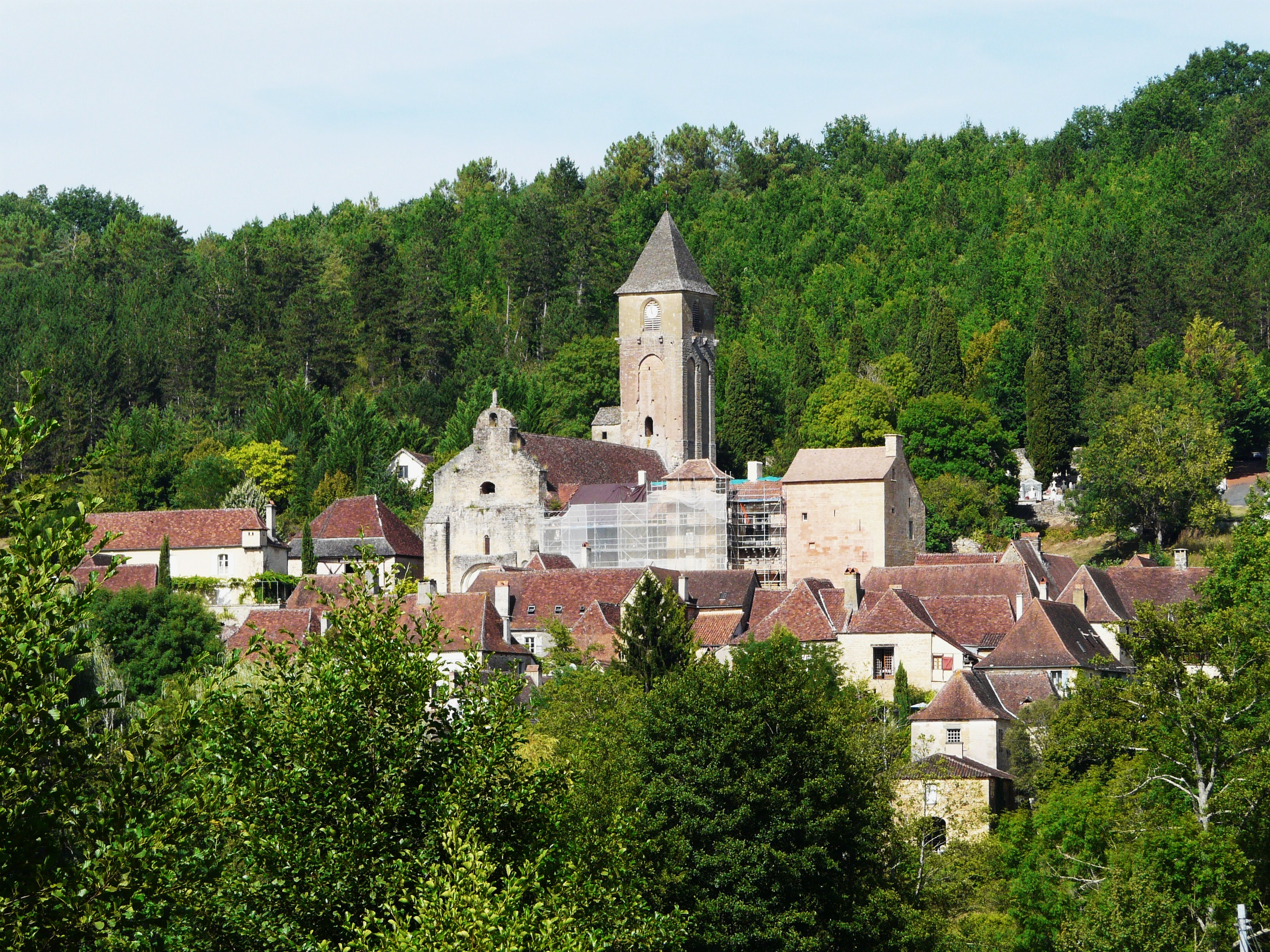
- A general view of Plazac

- Coat of arms
- Location of Plazac
- Location within France Location within Nouvelle-Aquitaine
- Coordinates: 45°02′09″N 1°02′25″E
- Country: France
- Region: Nouvelle-Aquitaine
- Department: Dordogne
- Arrondissement: Sarlat-la-Canéda
- Canton: Vallée de l'Homme

Government
  - Mayor (2020–2026): Florence Gauthier
- Area^{1}: 33.77 km^{2} (13.04 sq mi)
- Elevation: 100 m (330 ft)
- Highest elevation: 289 m (948 ft)
- Lowest elevation: 82 m (269 ft)
- Population (2023): 717
  - Density: 21.2/km^{2} (55.0/sq mi)
- Time zone: UTC+01:00 (CET)
  - Summer (DST): UTC+02:00 (CEST)
- INSEE/Postal code: 24330 /24580
- ^{1} French Land Register data, which excludes lakes, ponds, glaciers > 1 km^{2} (0.386 sq mi or 247 acres) and river estuaries.

Plazac (French pronunciation: [plazak]; Occitan: Plasac) is a commune in the Dordogne department in Nouvelle-Aquitaine in southwestern France. It is near the village of Les Eyzies and the city of Sarlat-la-Canéda.

The bishops of Périgueux built a fortified residence in Plazac in the 12th-13th century. Its donjon was transformed into a bell tower in the 17th century. Its chapel is now the village church. One wing of the residence has been preserved.

During World War II, Plazac sheltered the residents of Bootzheim (Alsace) who were evacuated.

== Population ==
Historical population
| Year | Pop. | ±% p.a. |
|---|---|---|
| 1968 | 424 | — |
| 1975 | 427 | +0.10% |
| 1982 | 502 | +2.34% |
| 1990 | 543 | +0.99% |
| 1999 | 577 | +0.68% |
| 2007 | 722 | +2.84% |
| 2012 | 688 | −0.96% |
| 2017 | 691 | +0.09% |
| 2023 | 717 | +0.62% |
Source: INSEE

== See also ==
- Communes of the Dordogne department
