= Sundhouse =

- Commune
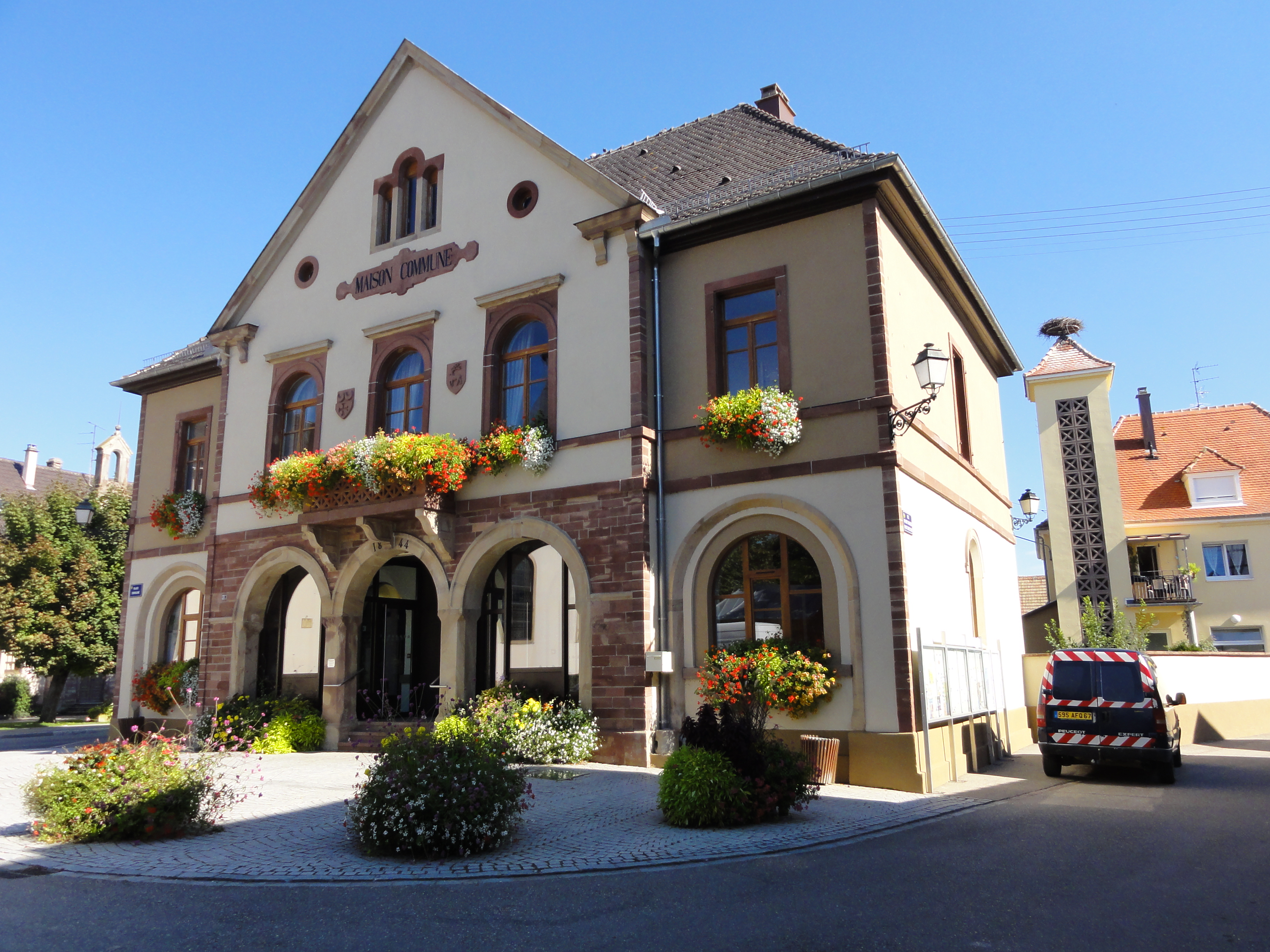
- The town hall in Sundhouse

- Coat of arms
- Location of Sundhouse
- Location within France Location within Grand Est
- Coordinates: 48°15′05″N 7°36′13″E
- Country: France
- Region: Grand Est
- Department: Bas-Rhin
- Arrondissement: Sélestat-Erstein
- Canton: Sélestat

Government
  - Mayor (2020–2026): Mathieu Klotz
- Area^{1}: 15.69 km^{2} (6.06 sq mi)
- Highest elevation: 170 m (560 ft)
- Lowest elevation: 162 m (531 ft)
- Population (2023): 1,808
  - Density: 115.2/km^{2} (298.5/sq mi)
- Time zone: UTC+01:00 (CET)
  - Summer (DST): UTC+02:00 (CEST)
- INSEE/Postal code: 67486 /67920
- ^{1} French Land Register data, which excludes lakes, ponds, glaciers > 1 km^{2} (0.386 sq mi or 247 acres) and river estuaries.

Sundhouse (French pronunciation: [synduz] or [sunduz]; German: Sundhausen) is a commune in the Bas-Rhin department in Alsace in north-eastern France.

== See also ==
- Communes of the Bas-Rhin department
