= Gerstheim =

Gerstheim Geerschte
- Commune
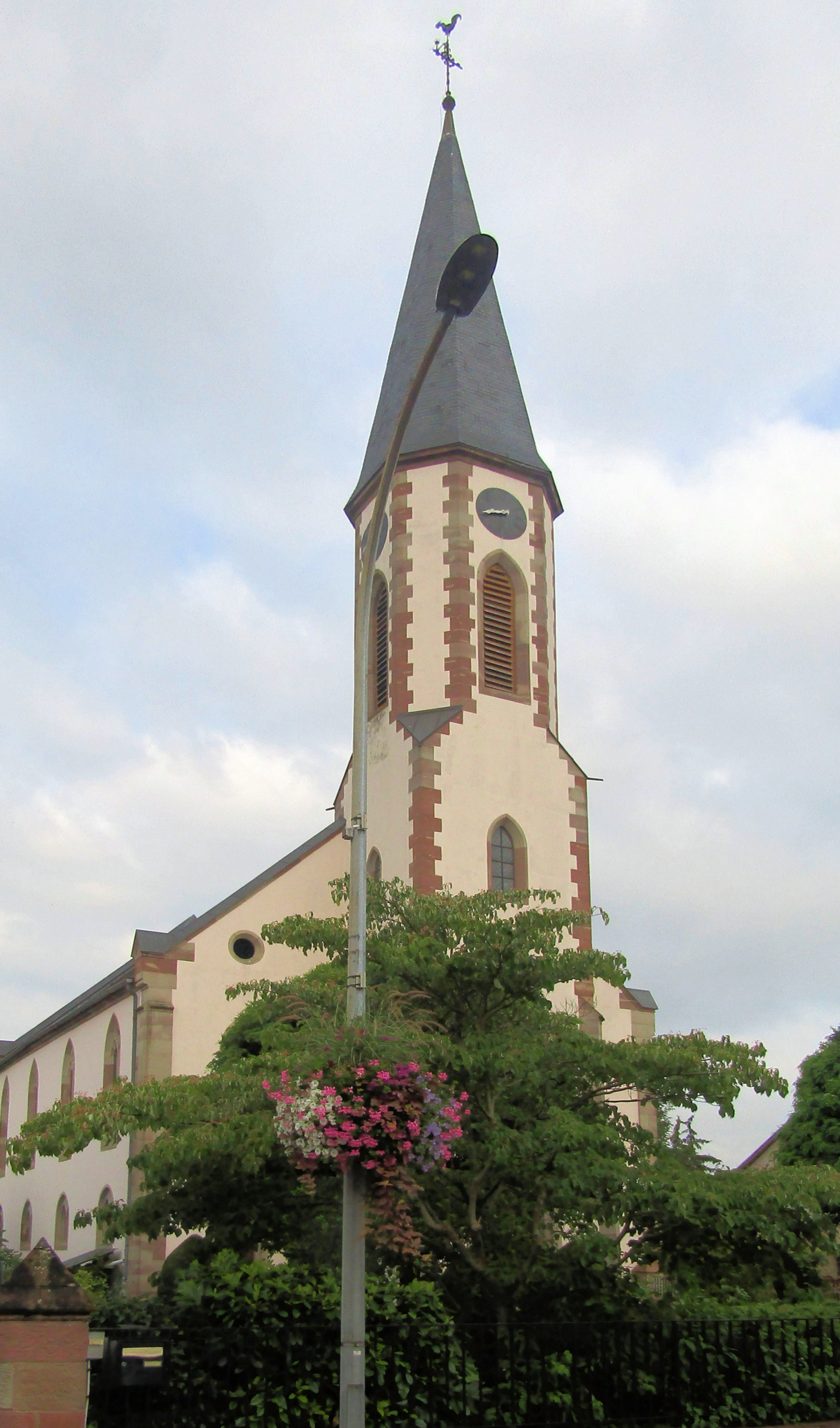
- The Protestant church in Gerstheim

- Coat of arms
- Location of Gerstheim
- Location within France Location within Grand Est
- Coordinates: 48°22′59″N 7°42′11″E
- Country: France
- Region: Grand Est
- Department: Bas-Rhin
- Arrondissement: Sélestat-Erstein
- Canton: Erstein

Government
  - Mayor (2021–2026): Julien Koegler
- Area^{1}: 16.42 km^{2} (6.34 sq mi)
- Highest elevation: 157 m (515 ft)
- Lowest elevation: 149 m (489 ft)
- Population (2023): 3,490
  - Density: 213/km^{2} (550/sq mi)
- Time zone: UTC+01:00 (CET)
  - Summer (DST): UTC+02:00 (CEST)
- INSEE/Postal code: 67154 /67150
- ^{1} French Land Register data, which excludes lakes, ponds, glaciers > 1 km^{2} (0.386 sq mi or 247 acres) and river estuaries.

Gerstheim (French pronunciation: [ɡɛʁstaim]) is a commune in the Bas-Rhin department in Alsace in north-eastern France.

== Geography ==
Situated between the canal that links the Rhône and the Rhine, and the Rhine itself, the little village is situated some 20 kilometres (12 mi) to the south of Strasbourg.

== Population ==
Historical population
Year	Pop.	±% p.a.
1968	2,057	—
1975	2,830	+4.66%
1982	3,008	+0.88%
1990	2,808	−0.86%
1999	2,785	−0.09%
2007	3,029	+1.06%
2012	3,249	+1.41%
2017	3,448	+1.20%
2023	3,490	+0.20%
Source: INSEE

== Economy ==
During the early twentieth century many jobs were provided by the tobacco and sugar industries. There are currently still a few employment opportunities involving agriculture and tourism in the village. There is also an EDF hydro-electric installation incorporating a lock and a road crossing on the Rhine. Some residents work in Strasbourg and many commute across the border to work in Germany.

One of Europe's largest theme parks positioned just across the border provides a large number of mainly seasonal low-paid jobs.

== Places to see ==
- A Jewish cemetery on the edge of the town (abandoned since 1940).
- Twelfth-century castle 'Manoir de Bancalis'.
- Artificial island 'L'île de Gerstheim ' created 1960 as part of the EDF hydro-electric project. Small nature reserve subject to periodic flooding.

== Organ ==
The Protestant church contains an organ built by the Wetzel brothers around 1870. In 1917 German troops requisitioned part of the instrument, but it was restored in 1926 by the Strasbourg organ builder Edmond Alexandre Roethinger. A further restoration took place in 1972.

== See also ==
- Communes of the Bas-Rhin department
