= Bindernheim =

Bindernheim Bíndre
- Commune
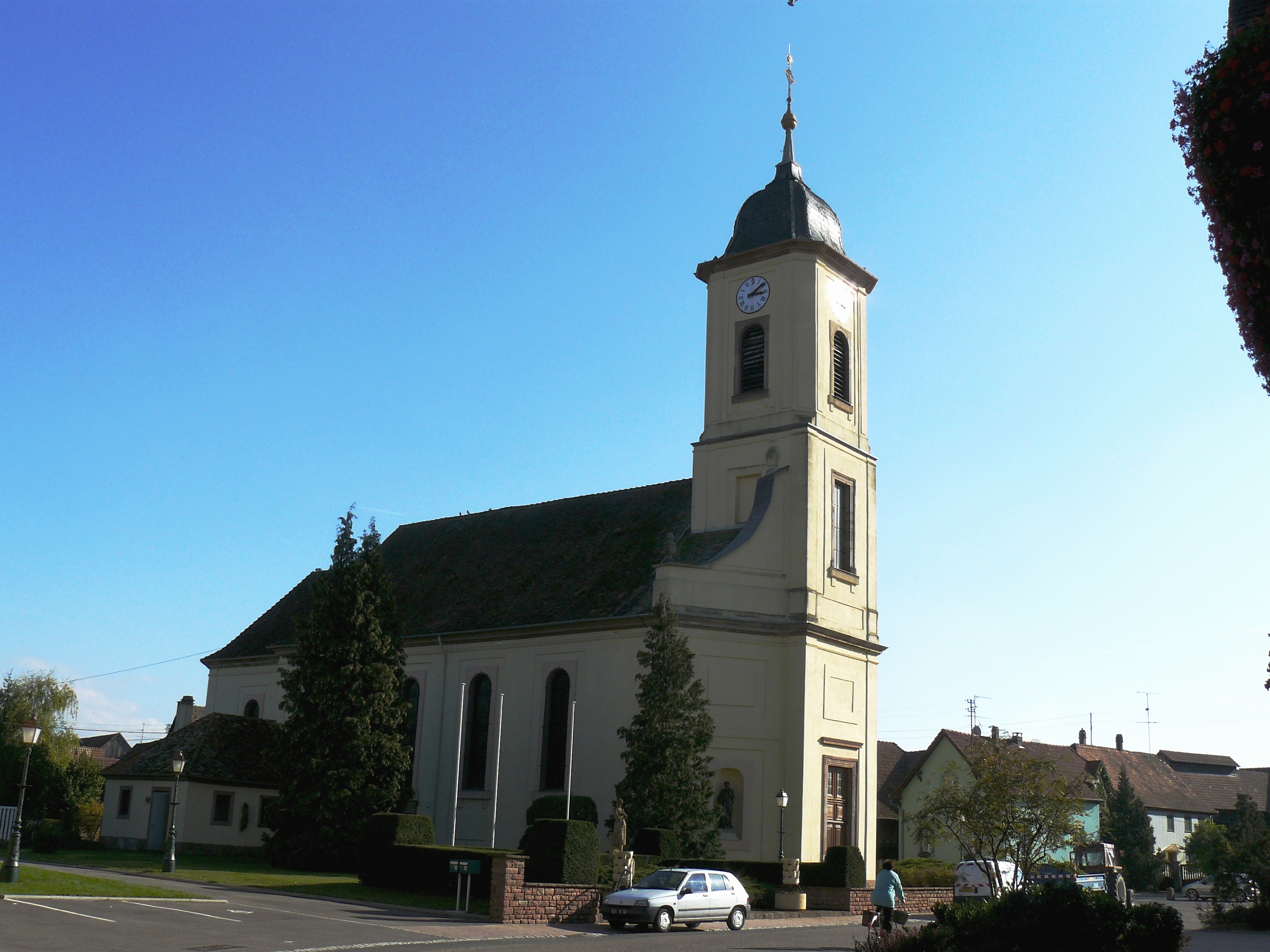
- The church in Bindernheim

- Coat of arms
- Location of Bindernheim
- Location within France Location within Grand Est
- Coordinates: 48°17′02″N 7°36′36″E
- Country: France
- Region: Grand Est
- Department: Bas-Rhin
- Arrondissement: Sélestat-Erstein
- Canton: Sélestat
- Intercommunality: Ried de Marckolsheim

Government
  - Mayor (2020–2026): Christian Memheld
- Area^{1}: 6.62 km^{2} (2.56 sq mi)
- Highest elevation: 166 m (545 ft)
- Lowest elevation: 161 m (528 ft)
- Population (2023): 1,055
  - Density: 159/km^{2} (413/sq mi)
- Time zone: UTC+01:00 (CET)
  - Summer (DST): UTC+02:00 (CEST)
- INSEE/Postal code: 67040 /67600
- ^{1} French Land Register data, which excludes lakes, ponds, glaciers > 1 km^{2} (0.386 sq mi or 247 acres) and river estuaries.

Bindernheim (French pronunciation: [bindəʁnaim]) is a commune in the Bas-Rhin department in Alsace in northeastern France.

== Population ==
Historical population
Year	Pop.	±% p.a.
1968	708	—
1975	720	+0.24%
1982	707	−0.26%
1990	690	−0.30%
1999	750	+0.93%
2007	860	+1.73%
2012	959	+2.20%
2017	1,032	+1.48%
2023	1,055	+0.37%
Source: INSEE

== See also ==
- Communes of the Bas-Rhin department
