= La Vancelle =

- Commune
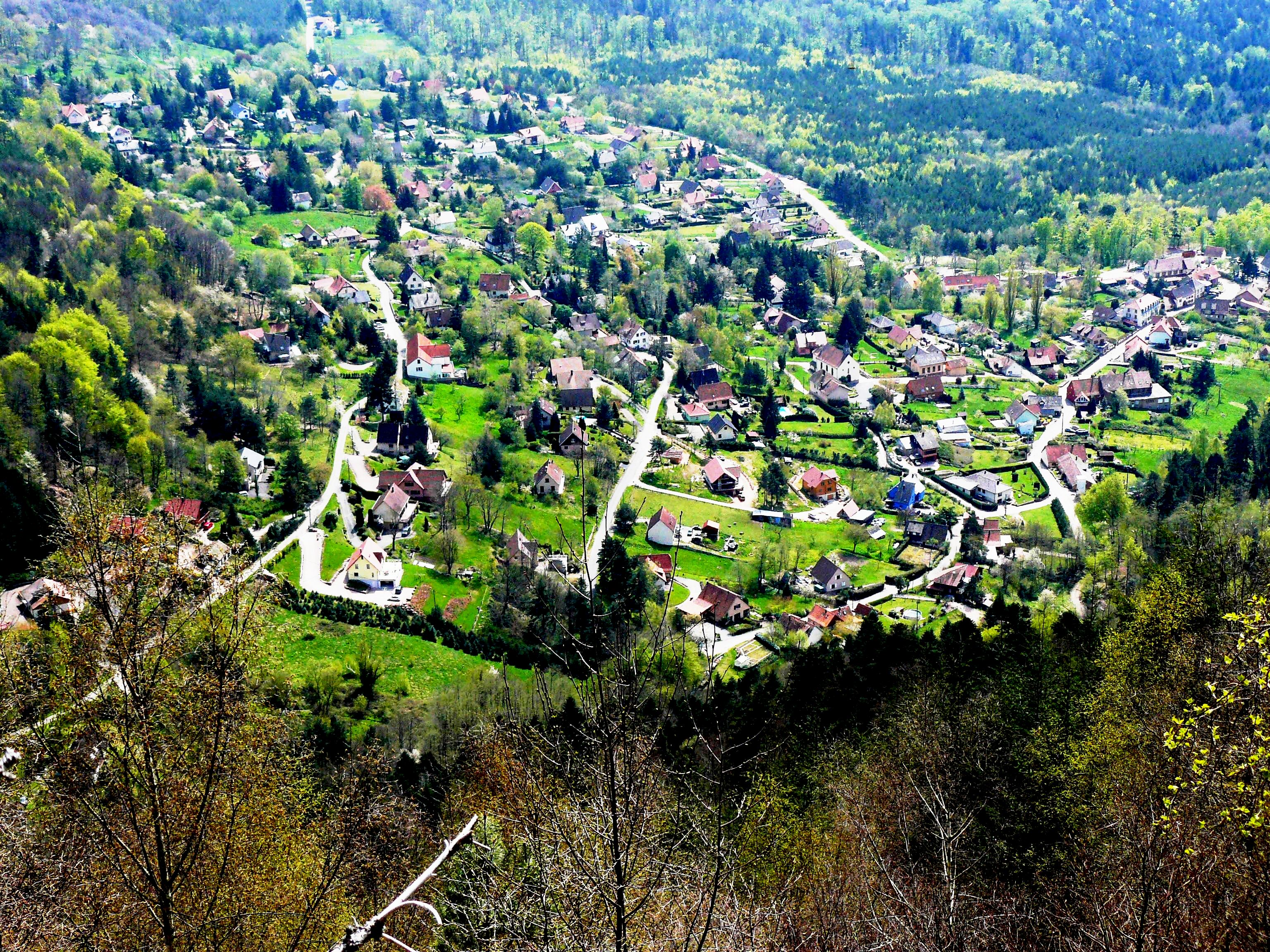
- A general view of La Vancelle

- Coat of arms
- Location of La Vancelle
- Location within France Location within Grand Est
- Coordinates: 48°17′13″N 7°18′17″E
- Country: France
- Region: Grand Est
- Department: Bas-Rhin
- Arrondissement: Sélestat-Erstein
- Canton: Sélestat
- Intercommunality: Sélestat

Government
  - Mayor (2020–2026): Michèle Claver
- Area^{1}: 7.88 km^{2} (3.04 sq mi)
- Elevation: 400 m (1,300 ft)
- Highest elevation: 810 m (2,660 ft)
- Lowest elevation: 217 m (712 ft)
- Population (2023): 402
  - Density: 51.0/km^{2} (132/sq mi)
- Time zone: UTC+01:00 (CET)
  - Summer (DST): UTC+02:00 (CEST)
- INSEE/Postal code: 67505 /67730
- ^{1} French Land Register data, which excludes lakes, ponds, glaciers > 1 km^{2} (0.386 sq mi or 247 acres) and river estuaries.

La Vancelle (French pronunciation: [la vɑ̃sɛl]; German: Wanzel) is a commune in the Bas-Rhin department in Alsace in north-eastern France.

== See also ==
- Communes of the Bas-Rhin department
