= Wittisheim =

- Commune
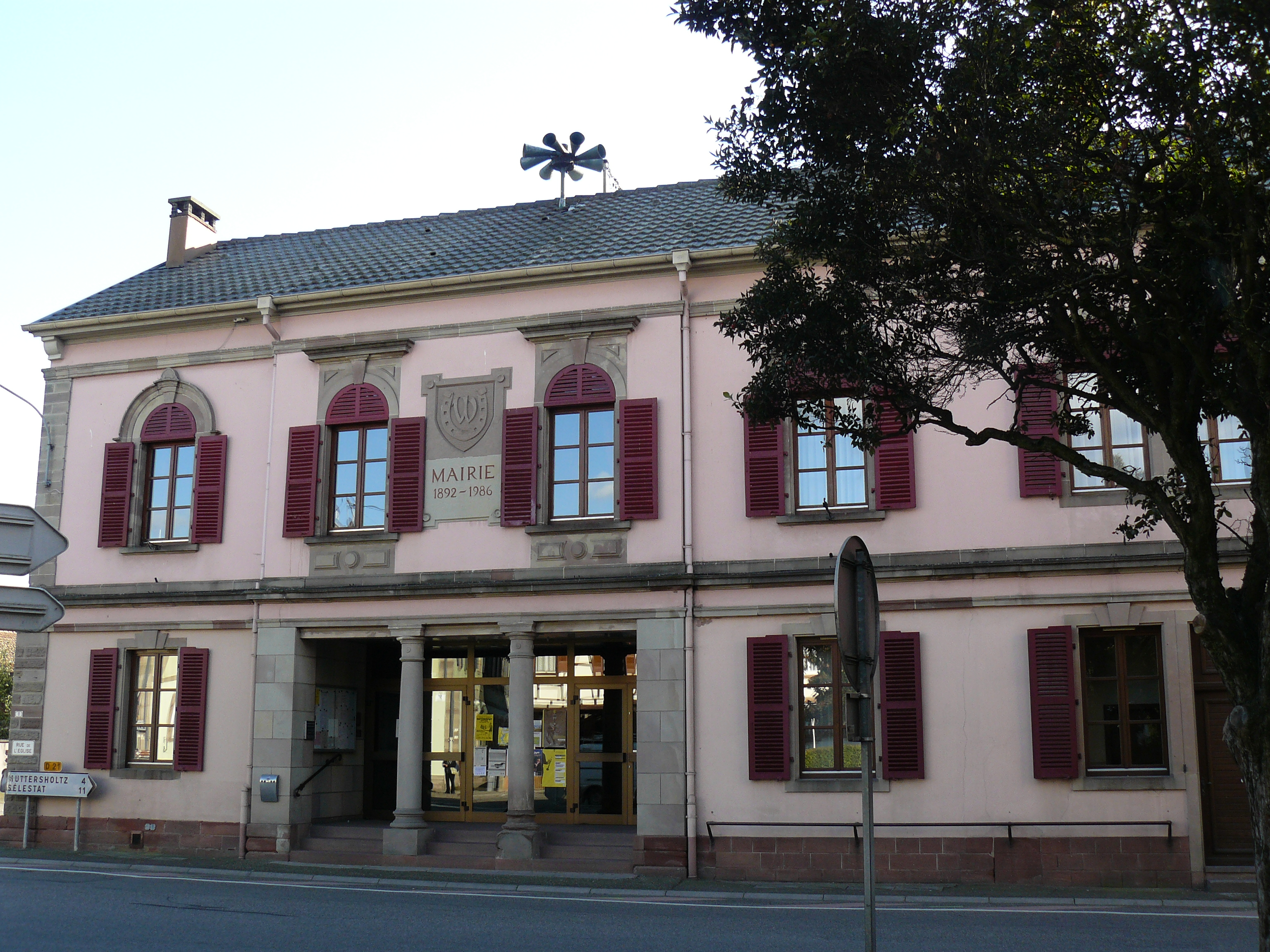
- The town hall in Wittisheim

- Coat of arms
- Location of Wittisheim
- Location within France Location within Grand Est
- Coordinates: 48°15′52″N 7°35′20″E
- Country: France
- Region: Grand Est
- Department: Bas-Rhin
- Arrondissement: Sélestat-Erstein
- Canton: Sélestat
- Intercommunality: Ried de Marckolsheim

Government
  - Mayor (2020–2026): Christophe Knobloch
- Area^{1}: 11.47 km^{2} (4.43 sq mi)
- Elevation: 166 m (545 ft)
- Highest elevation: 170 m (560 ft)
- Lowest elevation: 163 m (535 ft)
- Population (2023): 2,085
  - Density: 181.8/km^{2} (470.8/sq mi)
- Time zone: UTC+01:00 (CET)
  - Summer (DST): UTC+02:00 (CEST)
- INSEE/Postal code: 67547 /67820
- ^{1} French Land Register data, which excludes lakes, ponds, glaciers > 1 km^{2} (0.386 sq mi or 247 acres) and river estuaries.

Wittisheim (French pronunciation: [vitisaim]) is a commune in the Bas-Rhin department in Alsace in north-eastern France.

== Population ==
Historical population
Year	Pop.	±% p.a.
1968	1,703	—
1975	1,705	+0.02%
1982	1,660	−0.38%
1990	1,631	−0.22%
1999	1,822	+1.24%
2007	1,957	+0.90%
2012	2,081	+1.24%
2017	2,054	−0.26%
2023	2,085	+0.25%
Source: INSEE

== See also ==
- Communes of the Bas-Rhin department
