= Muttersholtz =

Muttersholtz Mieterschulz
- Commune
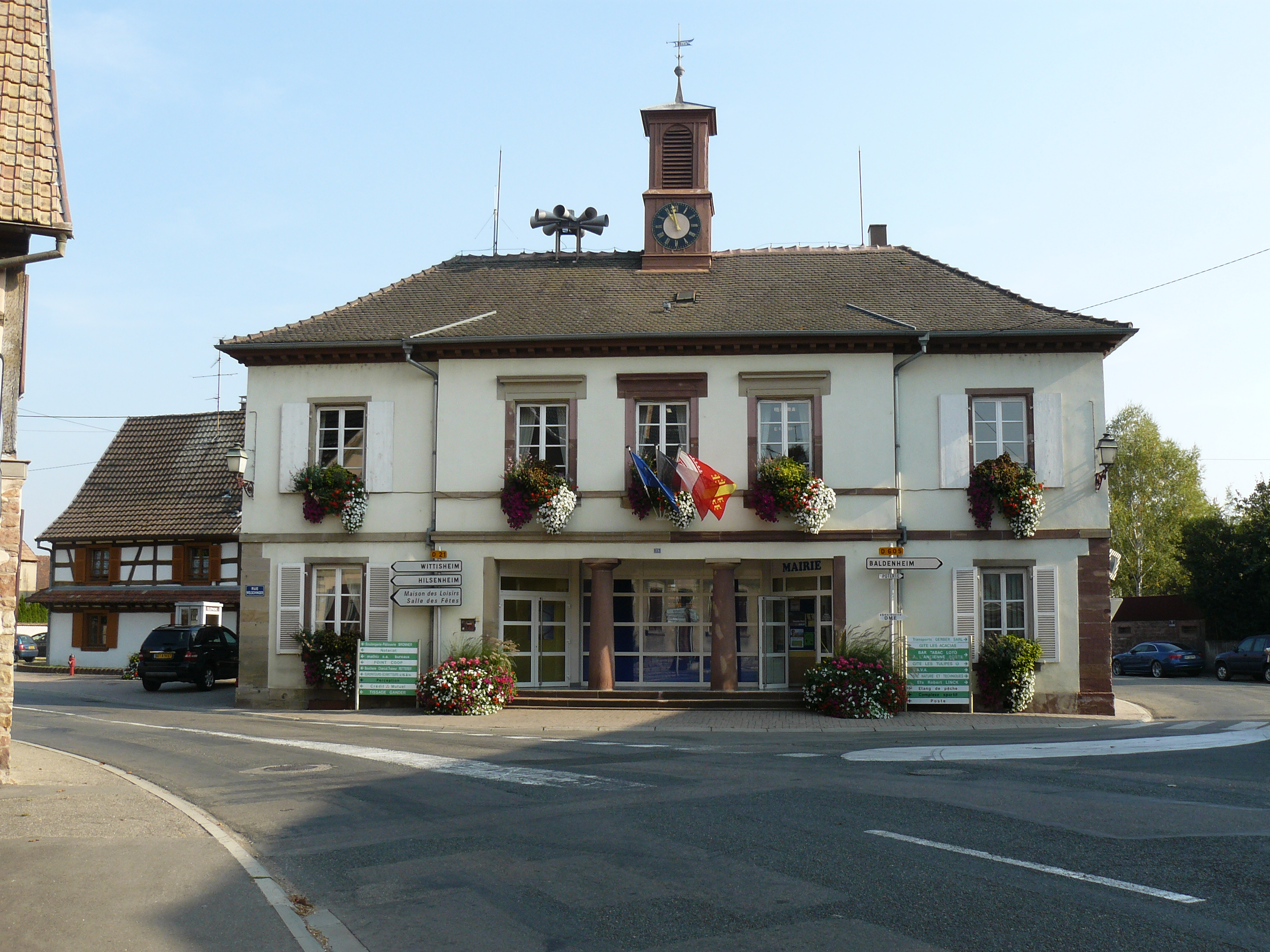
- The town hall in Muttersholtz

- Coat of arms
- Location of Muttersholtz
- Location within France Location within Grand Est
- Coordinates: 48°16′09″N 7°32′05″E
- Country: France
- Region: Grand Est
- Department: Bas-Rhin
- Arrondissement: Sélestat-Erstein
- Canton: Sélestat
- Intercommunality: Sélestat

Government
  - Mayor (2020–2026): Patrick Barbier
- Area^{1}: 12.67 km^{2} (4.89 sq mi)
- Highest elevation: 170 m (560 ft)
- Lowest elevation: 162 m (531 ft)
- Population (2023): 2,290
  - Density: 181/km^{2} (468/sq mi)
- Time zone: UTC+01:00 (CET)
  - Summer (DST): UTC+02:00 (CEST)
- INSEE/Postal code: 67311 /67600
- ^{1} French Land Register data, which excludes lakes, ponds, glaciers > 1 km^{2} (0.386 sq mi or 247 acres) and river estuaries.

Muttersholtz (French pronunciation: [mytəʁsɔlts]; German: Müttersholz) is a commune in the Bas-Rhin department in Alsace in north-eastern France.

== Population ==
Historical population
Year	Pop.	±% p.a.
1968	1,450	—
1975	1,559	+1.04%
1982	1,629	+0.63%
1990	1,651	+0.17%
1999	1,719	+0.45%
2007	1,895	+1.23%
2012	1,961	+0.69%
2017	2,013	+0.52%
2023	2,290	+2.17%
Source: INSEE

== See also ==
- Communes of the Bas-Rhin department
