= Saasenheim =

- Commune
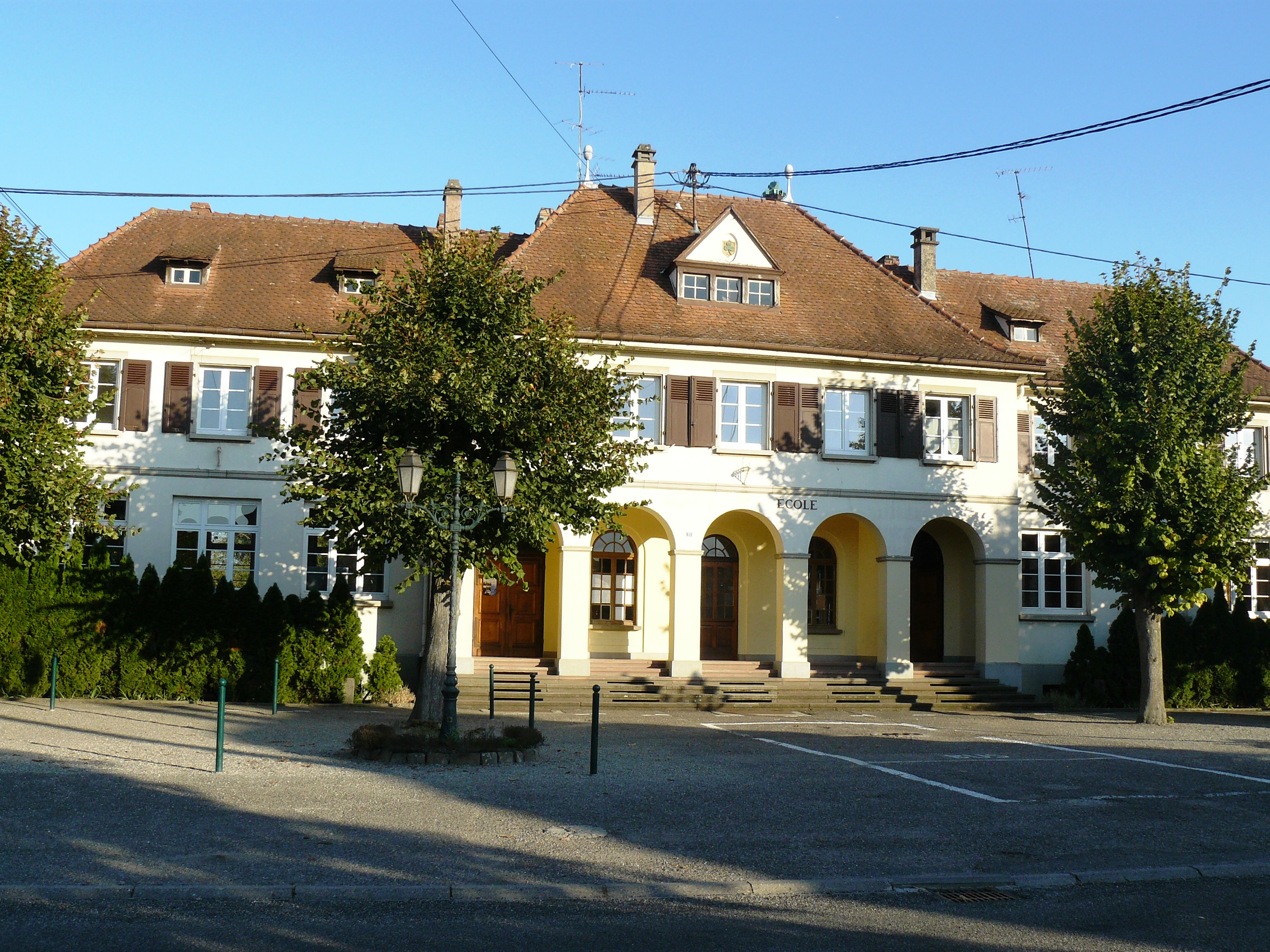
- The town hall in Saasenheim

- Coat of arms
- Location of Saasenheim
- Location within France Location within Grand Est
- Coordinates: 48°14′15″N 7°37′11″E
- Country: France
- Region: Grand Est
- Department: Bas-Rhin
- Arrondissement: Sélestat-Erstein
- Canton: Sélestat
- Intercommunality: Ried de Marckolsheim

Government
  - Mayor (2020–2026): Anne-Marie Neeff
- Area^{1}: 7.80 km^{2} (3.01 sq mi)
- Highest elevation: 170 m (560 ft)
- Lowest elevation: 164 m (538 ft)
- Population (2023): 573
  - Density: 73.5/km^{2} (190/sq mi)
- Time zone: UTC+01:00 (CET)
  - Summer (DST): UTC+02:00 (CEST)
- INSEE/Postal code: 67422 /67390
- ^{1} French Land Register data, which excludes lakes, ponds, glaciers > 1 km^{2} (0.386 sq mi or 247 acres) and river estuaries.

Saasenheim (French pronunciation: [sazənajm]) is a commune in the Bas-Rhin department in Alsace in north-eastern France.

== Population ==
Historical population
Year	Pop.	±% p.a.
1968	424	—
1975	447	+0.76%
1982	447	+0.00%
1990	458	+0.30%
1999	479	+0.50%
2007	579	+2.40%
2012	603	+0.82%
2017	600	−0.10%
2023	573	−0.76%
Source: INSEE

== See also ==
- Communes of the Bas-Rhin department
