= Elsenheim =

- Commune
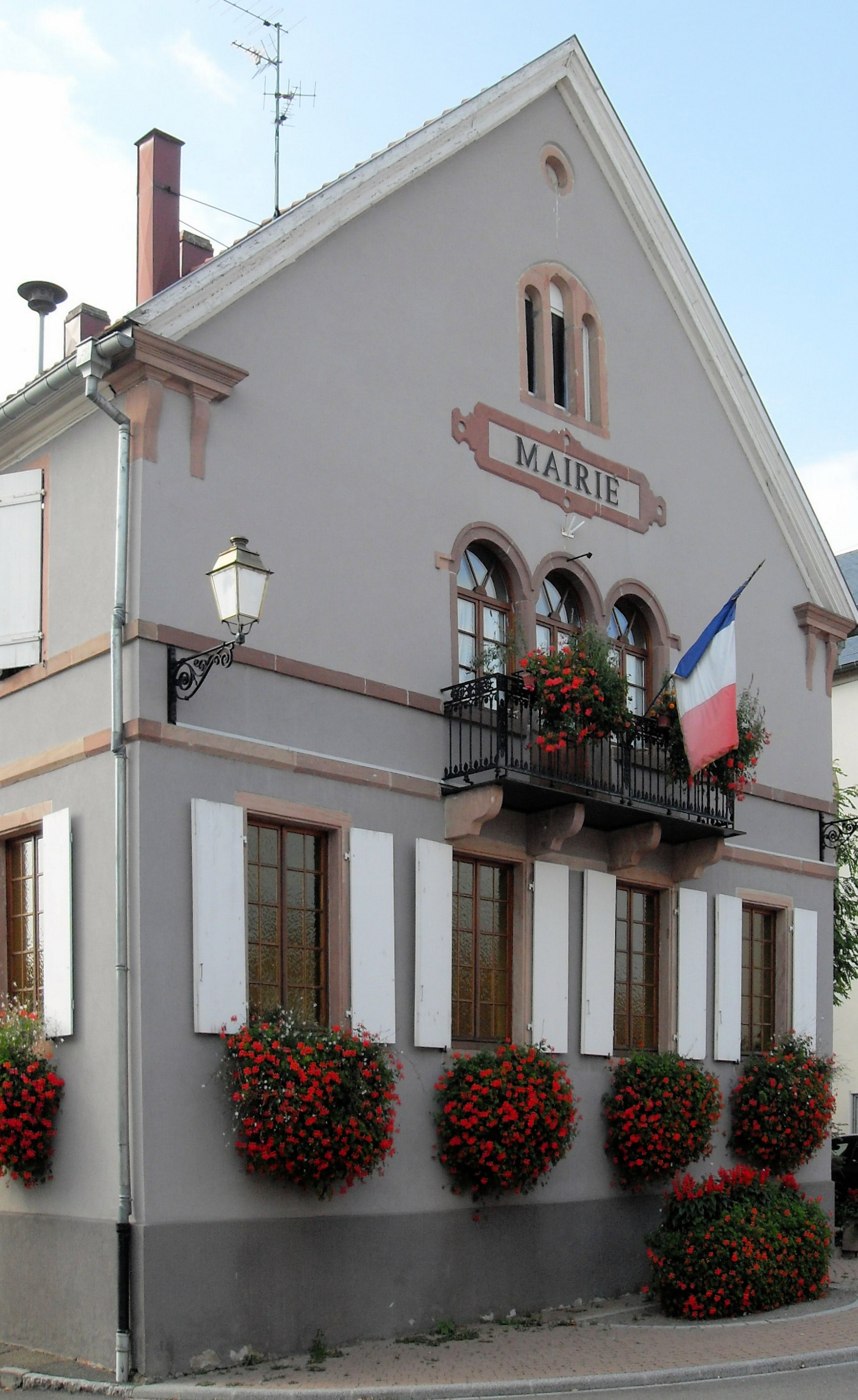
- The town hall in Elsenheim

- Coat of arms
- Location of Elsenheim
- Location within France Location within Grand Est
- Coordinates: 48°09′42″N 7°29′57″E
- Country: France
- Region: Grand Est
- Department: Bas-Rhin
- Arrondissement: Sélestat-Erstein
- Canton: Sélestat
- Intercommunality: Ried de Marckolsheim

Government
  - Mayor (2020–2026): Vincent Griss
- Area^{1}: 9.61 km^{2} (3.71 sq mi)
- Highest elevation: 182 m (597 ft)
- Lowest elevation: 175 m (574 ft)
- Population (2023): 803
  - Density: 83.6/km^{2} (216/sq mi)
- Time zone: UTC+01:00 (CET)
  - Summer (DST): UTC+02:00 (CEST)
- INSEE/Postal code: 67121 /67390
- ^{1} French Land Register data, which excludes lakes, ponds, glaciers > 1 km^{2} (0.386 sq mi or 247 acres) and river estuaries.

Elsenheim (French pronunciation: [ɛlzənaim]) is a commune, in the Bas-Rhin department in Alsace in north-eastern France.

== Population ==
Historical population
Year	Pop.	±% p.a.
1968	593	—
1975	575	−0.44%
1982	572	−0.07%
1990	637	+1.35%
1999	679	+0.71%
2007	796	+2.01%
2012	819	+0.57%
2017	813	−0.15%
2023	803	−0.21%
Source: INSEE

== See also ==
- Communes of the Bas-Rhin department
