= Schœnau =

- Commune
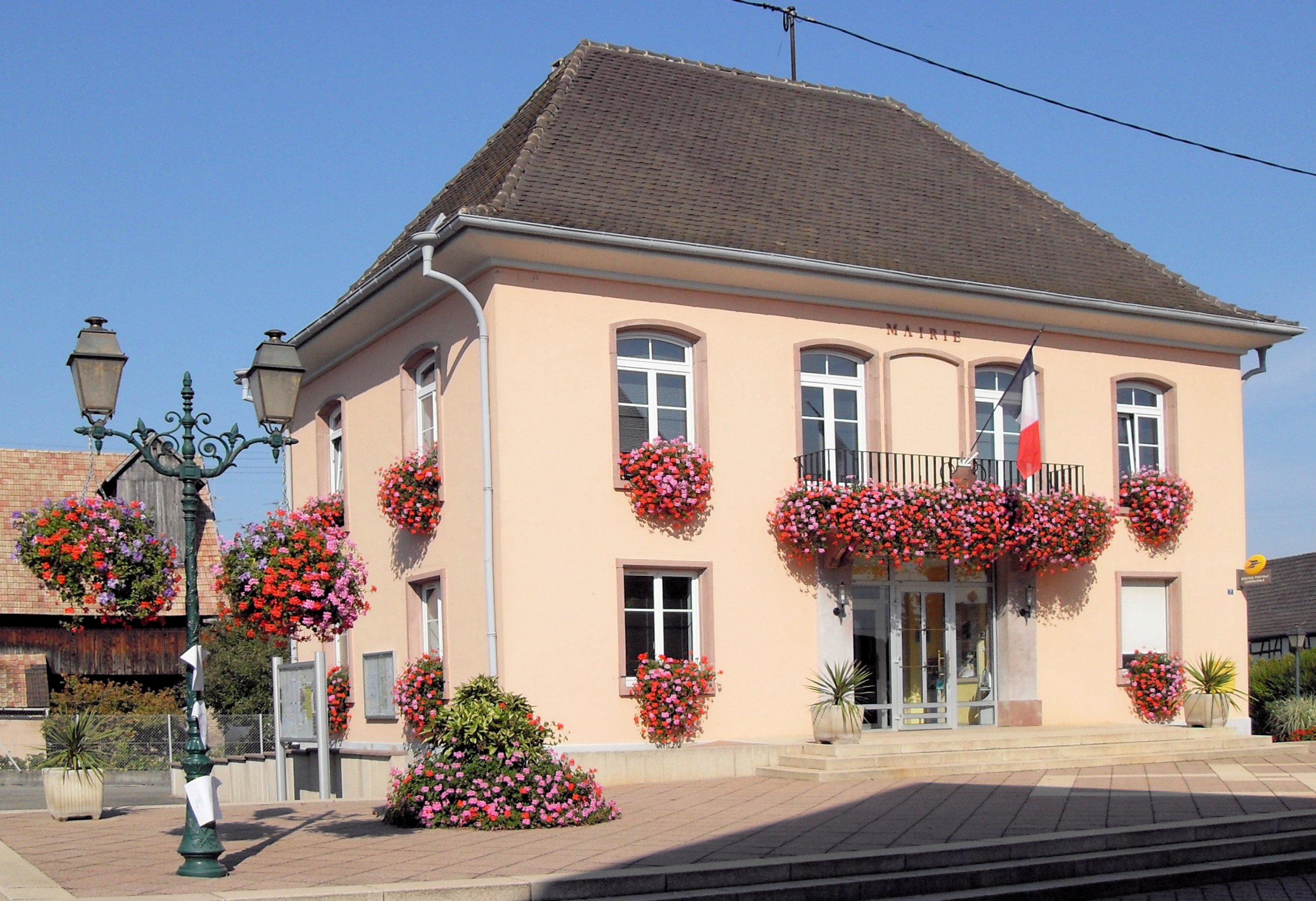
- The town hall in Schœnau

- Coat of arms
- Location of Schœnau
- Location within France Location within Grand Est
- Coordinates: 48°13′25″N 7°38′48″E
- Country: France
- Region: Grand Est
- Department: Bas-Rhin
- Arrondissement: Sélestat-Erstein
- Canton: Sélestat
- Intercommunality: CC Ried de Marckolsheim

Government
  - Mayor (2020–2026): Michel Butscha
- Area^{1}: 10.37 km^{2} (4.00 sq mi)
- Highest elevation: 172 m (564 ft)
- Lowest elevation: 164 m (538 ft)
- Population (2023): 587
  - Density: 56.6/km^{2} (147/sq mi)
- Time zone: UTC+01:00 (CET)
  - Summer (DST): UTC+02:00 (CEST)
- INSEE/Postal code: 67453 /67390
- ^{1} French Land Register data, which excludes lakes, ponds, glaciers > 1 km^{2} (0.386 sq mi or 247 acres) and river estuaries.

Schœnau (French pronunciation: [ʃøno] or [ʃønau]; German: Schönau; Alsatian: Scheenâi) is a commune in the Bas-Rhin department and Grand Est region of north-eastern France.

== Population ==
Historical population
Year	Pop.	±% p.a.
1968	416	—
1975	389	−0.95%
1982	448	+2.04%
1990	420	−0.80%
1999	473	+1.33%
2007	532	+1.48%
2012	591	+2.13%
2017	602	+0.37%
2023	587	−0.42%
Source: INSEE

== See also ==
- Communes of the Bas-Rhin department
