= Ohnenheim =

- Commune
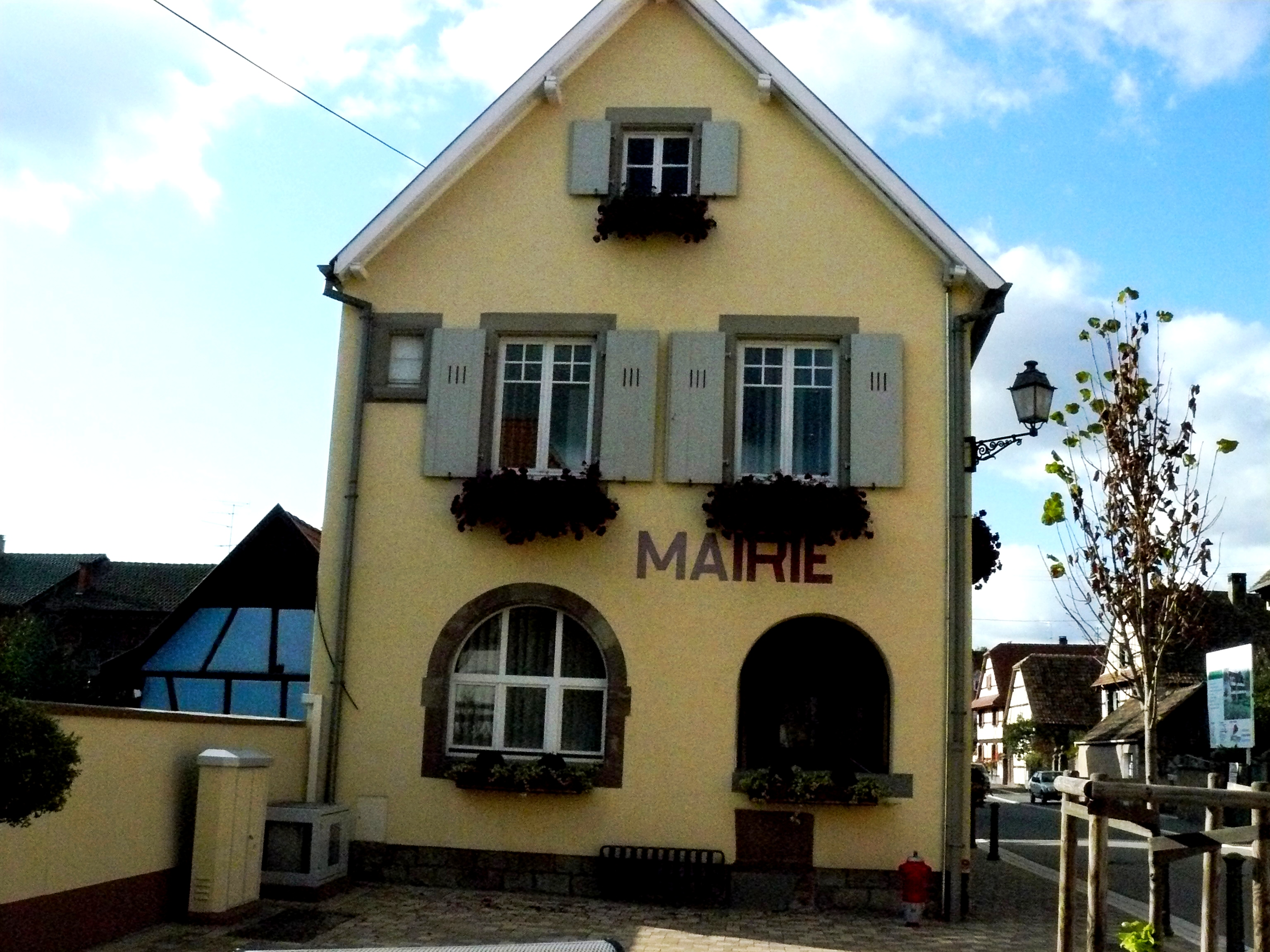
- The town hall in Ohnenheim

- Coat of arms
- Location of Ohnenheim
- Location within France Location within Grand Est
- Coordinates: 48°11′03″N 7°30′28″E
- Country: France
- Region: Grand Est
- Department: Bas-Rhin
- Arrondissement: Sélestat-Erstein
- Canton: Sélestat

Government
  - Mayor (2020–2026): Jacqueline Schunck
- Area^{1}: 12.12 km^{2} (4.68 sq mi)
- Highest elevation: 178 m (584 ft)
- Lowest elevation: 172 m (564 ft)
- Population (2023): 1,164
  - Density: 96.04/km^{2} (248.7/sq mi)
- Time zone: UTC+01:00 (CET)
  - Summer (DST): UTC+02:00 (CEST)
- INSEE/Postal code: 67360 /67390
- ^{1} French Land Register data, which excludes lakes, ponds, glaciers > 1 km^{2} (0.386 sq mi or 247 acres) and river estuaries.

Ohnenheim (French pronunciation: [onənaim]) is a commune in the Bas-Rhin department in Alsace in north-eastern France.

== See also ==
- Communes of the Bas-Rhin department
