= Canton of Sélestat =

Coordinates: 48.26°N 7.45°E

- Canton
- Situation of the canton of Sélestat in the department of Bas-Rhin
- Country: France
- Region: Grand Est
- Department: Bas-Rhin
- No. of communes: {{{nbcomm}}}
- Population (2023): 57,359
- INSEE code: 6716

The canton of Sélestat is an administrative division of the Bas-Rhin department, northeastern France. Its borders were modified at the French canton reorganisation which came into effect in March 2015. Its seat is in Sélestat.

It consists of the following communes:

1. Artolsheim
2. Baldenheim
3. Bindernheim
4. Bœsenbiesen
5. Bootzheim
6. Châtenois
7. Dieffenthal
8. Ebersheim
9. Ebersmunster
10. Elsenheim
11. Heidolsheim
12. Hessenheim
13. Hilsenheim
14. Kintzheim
15. Mackenheim
16. Marckolsheim
17. Mussig
18. Muttersholtz
19. Ohnenheim
20. Orschwiller
21. Richtolsheim
22. Saasenheim
23. Scherwiller
24. Schœnau
25. Schwobsheim
26. Sélestat
27. Sundhouse
28. La Vancelle
29. Wittisheim
