= Mussig =

Mussig Müssig
- Commune
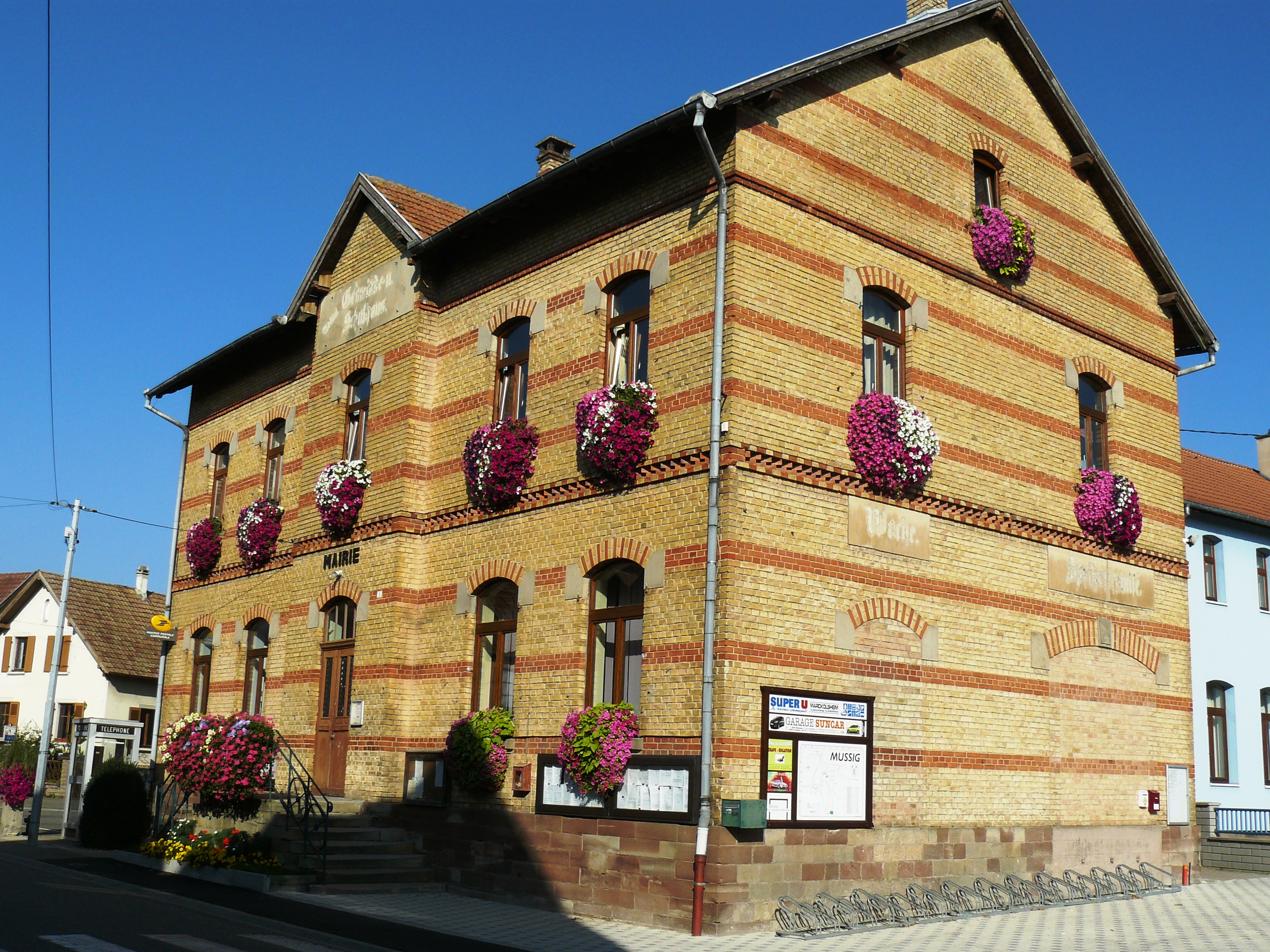
- The town hall in Mussig

- Coat of arms
- Location of Mussig
- Location within France Location within Grand Est
- Coordinates: 48°13′46″N 7°31′15″E
- Country: France
- Region: Grand Est
- Department: Bas-Rhin
- Arrondissement: Sélestat-Erstein
- Canton: Sélestat
- Intercommunality: Sélestat

Government
  - Mayor (2020–2026): Philippe Wotling
- Area^{1}: 11.73 km^{2} (4.53 sq mi)
- Highest elevation: 174 m (571 ft)
- Lowest elevation: 167 m (548 ft)
- Population (2023): 1,111
  - Density: 94.71/km^{2} (245.3/sq mi)
- Time zone: UTC+01:00 (CET)
  - Summer (DST): UTC+02:00 (CEST)
- INSEE/Postal code: 67310 /67600
- ^{1} French Land Register data, which excludes lakes, ponds, glaciers > 1 km^{2} (0.386 sq mi or 247 acres) and river estuaries.

Mussig (French pronunciation: [mysiɡ]) is a commune in the Bas-Rhin department in Alsace in north-eastern France. Successive known names carried by the village were: Moussich, Mosich (1370) and Musich (1453) before becoming Musselburgh. The etymological origin is probably to be found in the existence of wetlands and swamps are conducive to the formation of foam. Until the 19th century was practiced widely growing flax and hemp, woven at home or delivered to the weavers in the valley of Sainte-Marie-aux-Mines, this is still in the early twentieth century.

== See also ==
- Communes of the Bas-Rhin department
