= Ebersheim, Bas-Rhin =

Ebersheim Awersche
- Commune
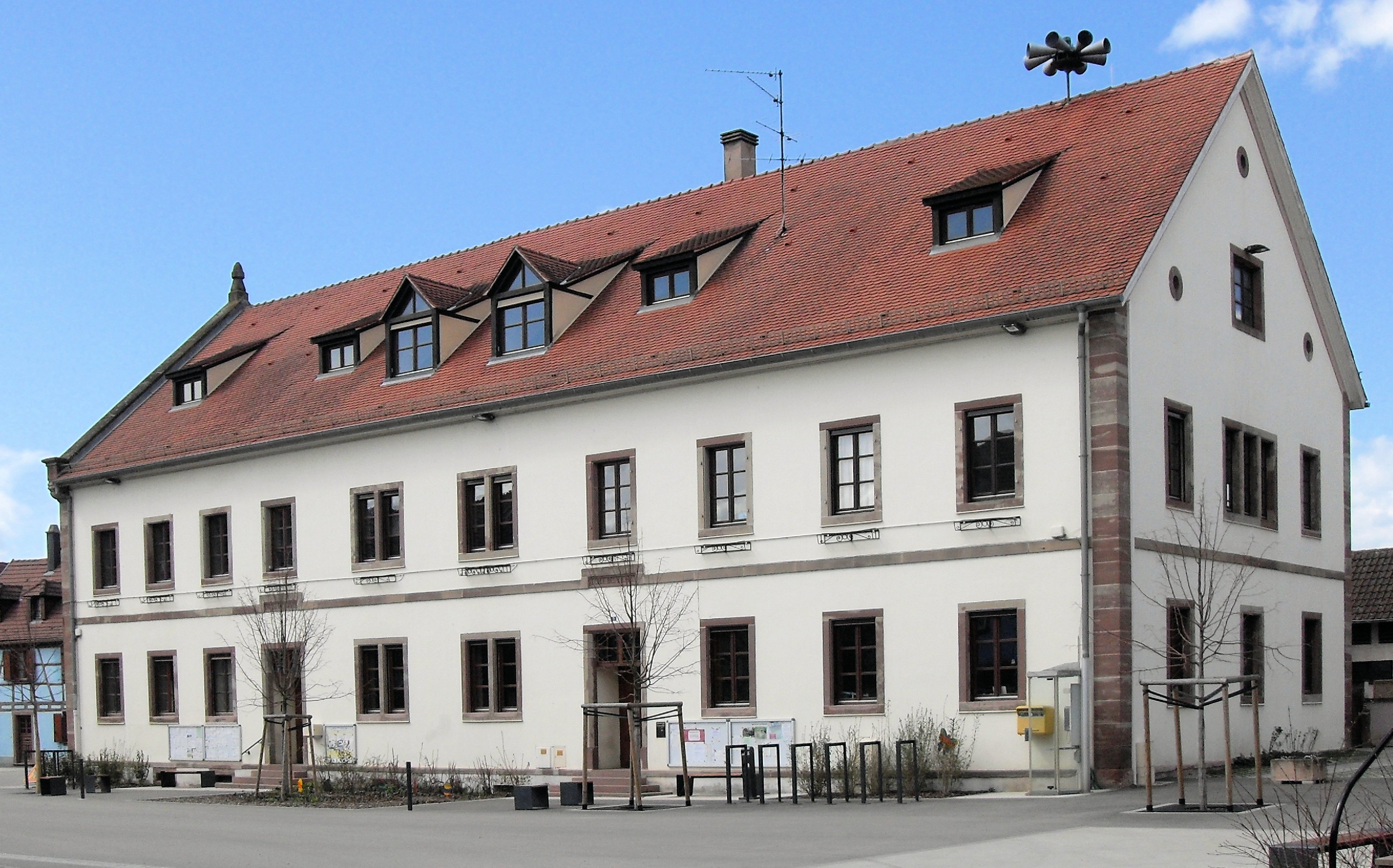
- The town hall in Ebersheim

- Coat of arms
- Location of Ebersheim
- Location within France Location within Grand Est
- Coordinates: 48°18′15″N 7°30′02″E
- Country: France
- Region: Grand Est
- Department: Bas-Rhin
- Arrondissement: Sélestat-Erstein
- Canton: Sélestat
- Intercommunality: Sélestat

Government
  - Mayor (2020–2026): Michel Wira
- Area^{1}: 13.66 km^{2} (5.27 sq mi)
- Highest elevation: 173 m (568 ft)
- Lowest elevation: 160 m (520 ft)
- Population (2023): 2,284
  - Density: 167.2/km^{2} (433.1/sq mi)
- Time zone: UTC+01:00 (CET)
  - Summer (DST): UTC+02:00 (CEST)
- INSEE/Postal code: 67115 /67600
- ^{1} French Land Register data, which excludes lakes, ponds, glaciers > 1 km^{2} (0.386 sq mi or 247 acres) and river estuaries.

Ebersheim (French pronunciation: [ebəʁsaim]) is a commune in the Bas-Rhin department in Alsace in north-eastern France.

== Population ==
Historical population
Year	Pop.	±% p.a.
1968	1,624	—
1975	1,635	+0.10%
1982	1,597	−0.34%
1990	1,675	+0.60%
1999	1,854	+1.13%
2007	2,004	+0.98%
2012	2,312	+2.90%
2017	2,239	−0.64%
2023	2,284	+0.33%
Source: INSEE

== See also ==
- Communes of the Bas-Rhin department
