= Mackenheim =

Mackenheim Mackene
- Commune
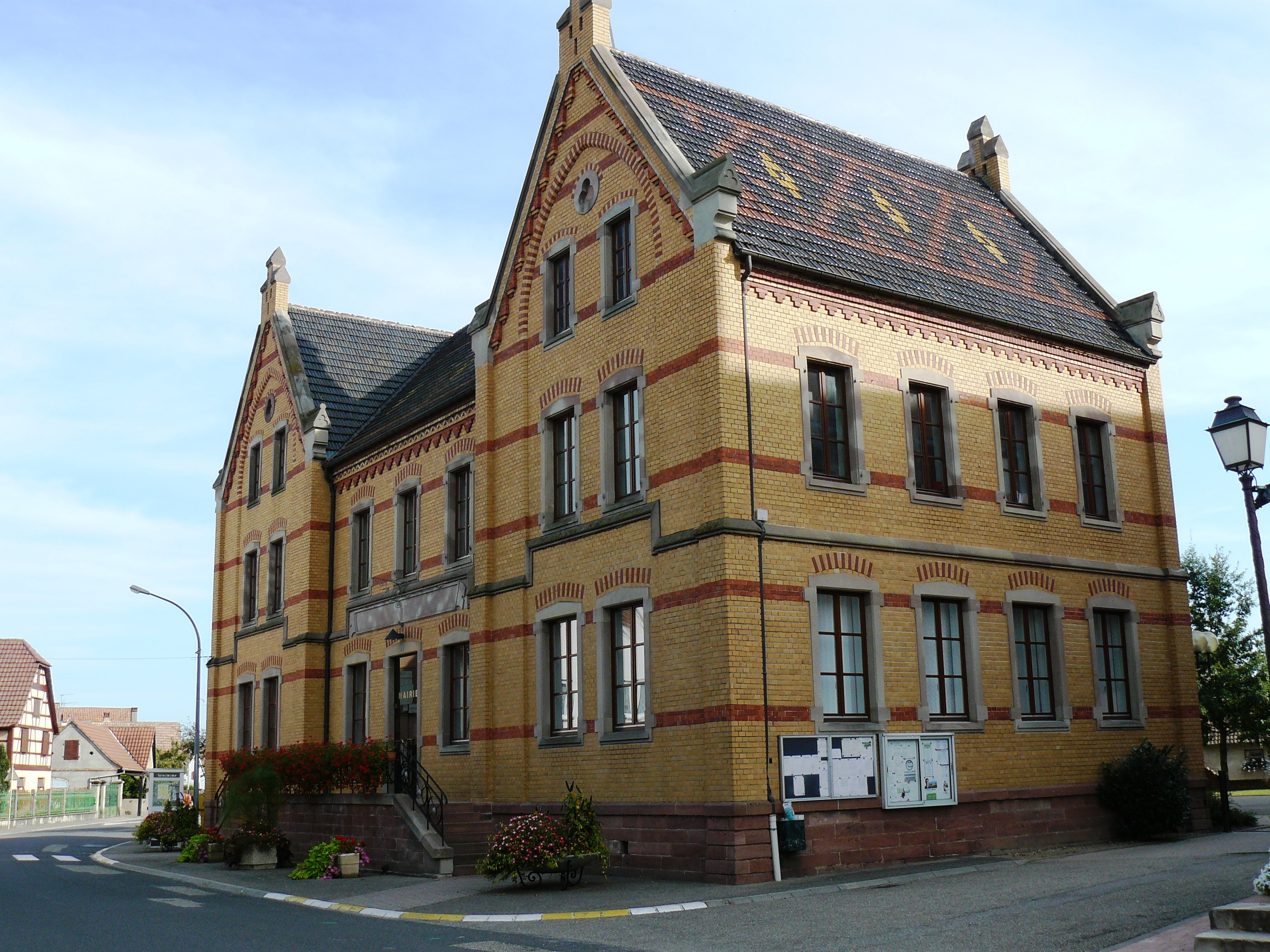
- The town hall in Mackenheim

- Coat of arms
- Location of Mackenheim
- Location within France Location within Grand Est
- Coordinates: 48°11′07″N 7°34′00″E
- Country: France
- Region: Grand Est
- Department: Bas-Rhin
- Arrondissement: Sélestat-Erstein
- Canton: Sélestat

Government
  - Mayor (2020–2026): Jean-Claude Spielmann
- Area^{1}: 11.79 km^{2} (4.55 sq mi)
- Highest elevation: 178 m (584 ft)
- Lowest elevation: 169 m (554 ft)
- Population (2023): 768
  - Density: 65.1/km^{2} (169/sq mi)
- Time zone: UTC+01:00 (CET)
  - Summer (DST): UTC+02:00 (CEST)
- INSEE/Postal code: 67277 /67390
- ^{1} French Land Register data, which excludes lakes, ponds, glaciers > 1 km^{2} (0.386 sq mi or 247 acres) and river estuaries.

Mackenheim (French pronunciation: [makənaim]) is a French commune located in the department of Bas-Rhin and, since 1 January 2021, in the Grand Est region within the territory of the European Community of Alsace.

This commune is located in the historical and cultural region of Alsace.

== Geography ==
Situated halfway between Strasbourg and Mulhouse, 2 km from the Rhine, this Ried village in central Alsace has a population of nearly 750. The village is part of the canton of Marckolsheim and the district of Sélestat-Erstein.

Two landscapes characterise its territory: agricultural areas dominated by maize cultivation and the Rhine forest recognised as a remarkable natural area. Several large buildings, mostly built in the 19th century (the church, the former synagogue, the town hall-school, the presbytery, the forest house, etc.) give the village a special character. Today, the preservation of the old built heritage is combined with the creation of new residential areas.

== See also ==
- Communes of the Bas-Rhin department
