= Marckolsheim =

Marckolsheim Màrkelse
- Commune
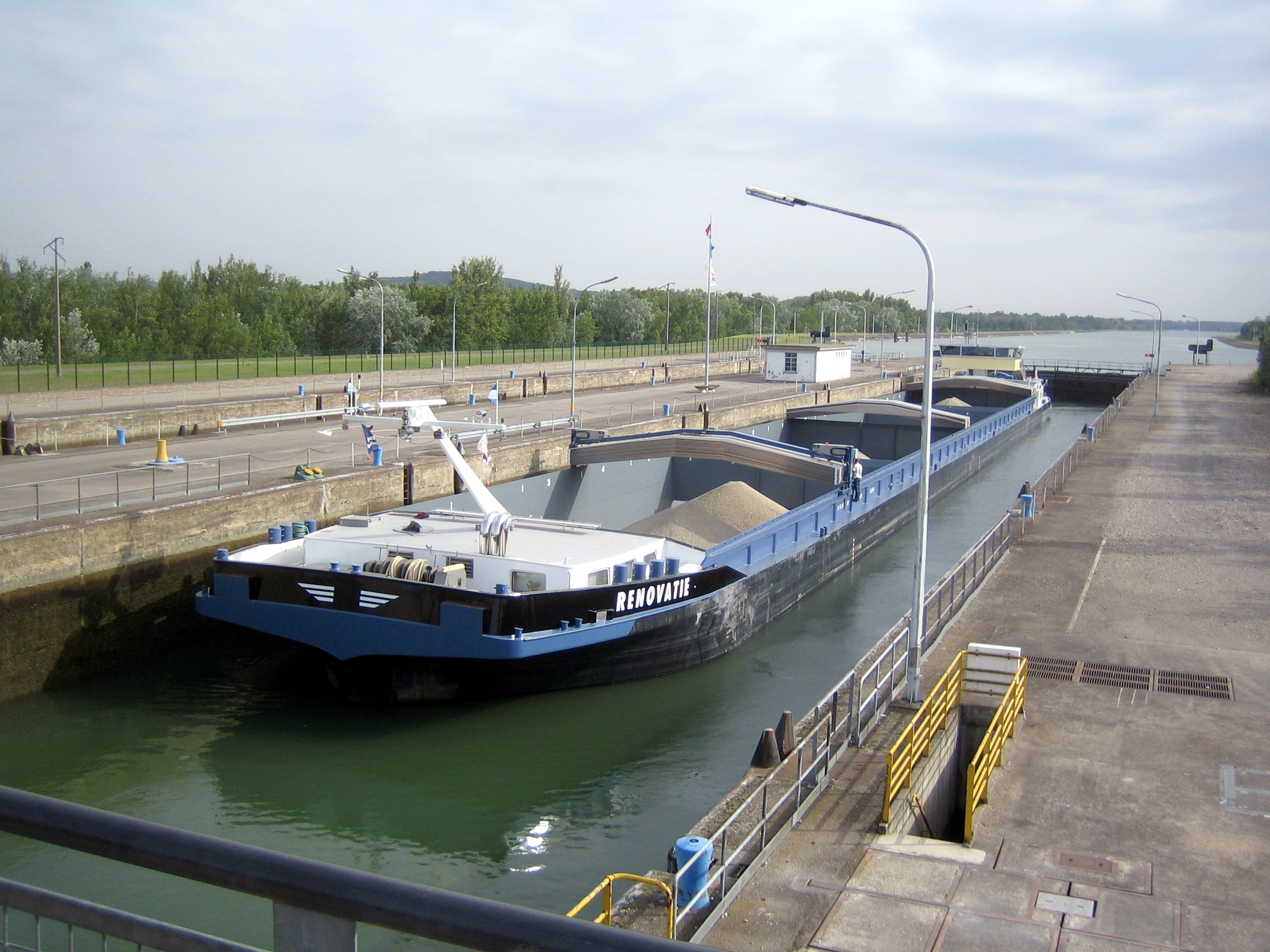
- Barge in the lock beside the power station

- Coat of arms
- Location of Marckolsheim
- Location within France Location within Grand Est
- Coordinates: 48°10′N 7°32′E
- Country: France
- Region: Grand Est
- Department: Bas-Rhin
- Arrondissement: Sélestat-Erstein
- Canton: Sélestat
- Intercommunality: Ried de Marckolsheim

Government
  - Mayor (2020–2026): Frédéric Pfliegersdoerffer
- Area^{1}: 33.36 km^{2} (12.88 sq mi)
- Highest elevation: 184 m (604 ft)
- Lowest elevation: 170 m (560 ft)
- Population (2023): 4,398
  - Density: 131.8/km^{2} (341.4/sq mi)
- Time zone: UTC+01:00 (CET)
  - Summer (DST): UTC+02:00 (CEST)
- INSEE/Postal code: 67281 /67390
- ^{1} French Land Register data, which excludes lakes, ponds, glaciers > 1 km^{2} (0.386 sq mi or 247 acres) and river estuaries.

Marckolsheim (French pronunciation: [maʁkɔlsaim]; German: Markolsheim) is a commune in the Bas-Rhin department in Alsace in north-eastern France.

On the eastern edge of the town the Casemate de Marckolsheim Sud, a Maginot Line fortification left over from the Second World War, has been converted into a small museum. Approximately 3 kilometres to the east the Rhine has been dammed and a hydro-electric power station installed.

== Population ==
Historical population
Year	Pop.	±% p.a.
1968	3,328	—
1975	2,779	−2.54%
1982	3,124	+1.69%
1990	3,306	+0.71%
1999	3,614	+0.99%
2007	4,185	+1.85%
2012	4,171	−0.07%
2017	4,151	−0.10%
2023	4,398	+0.97%
Source: INSEE

== Gallery ==
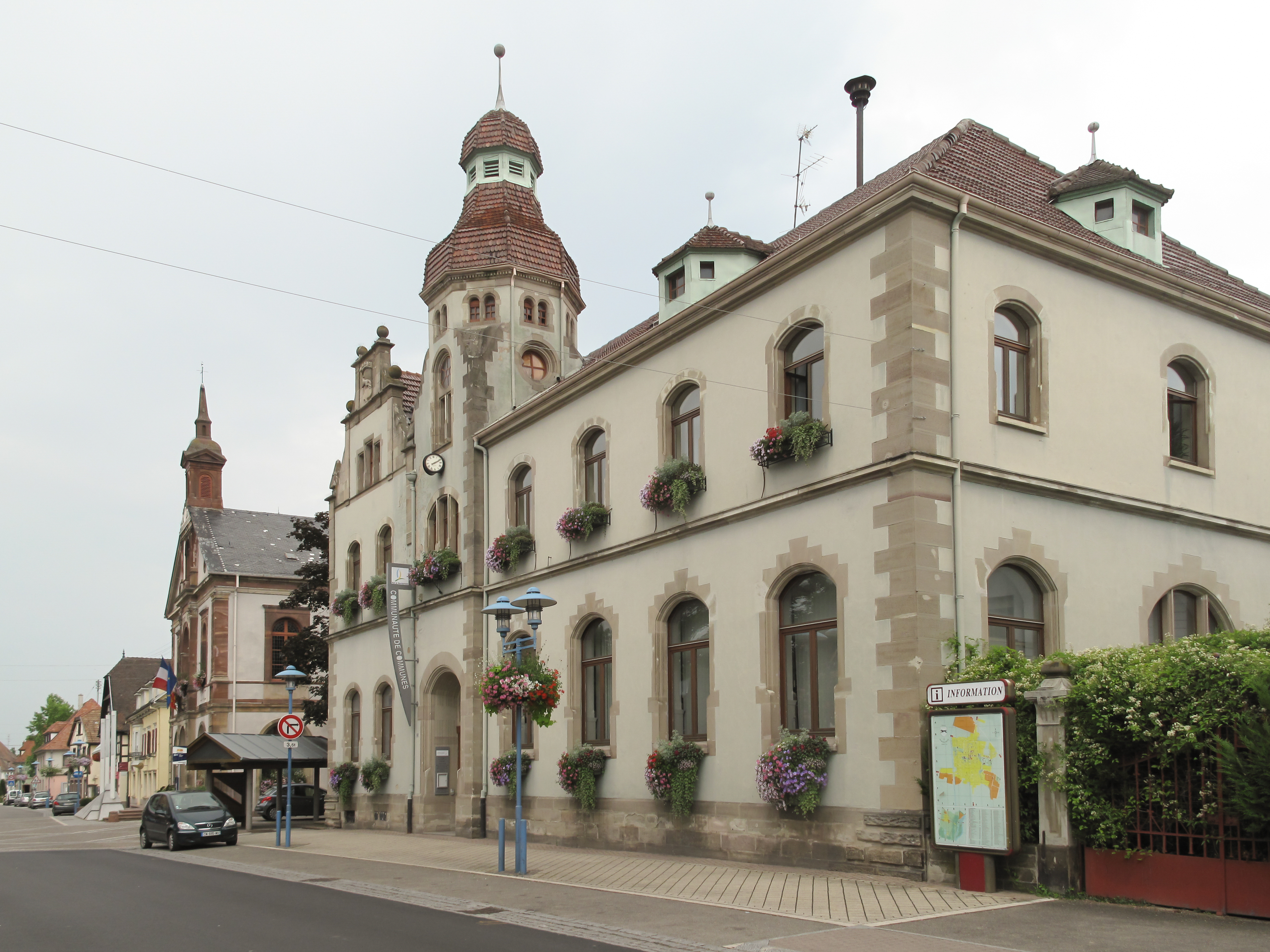
Rue du Maréchal Foch near the townhall

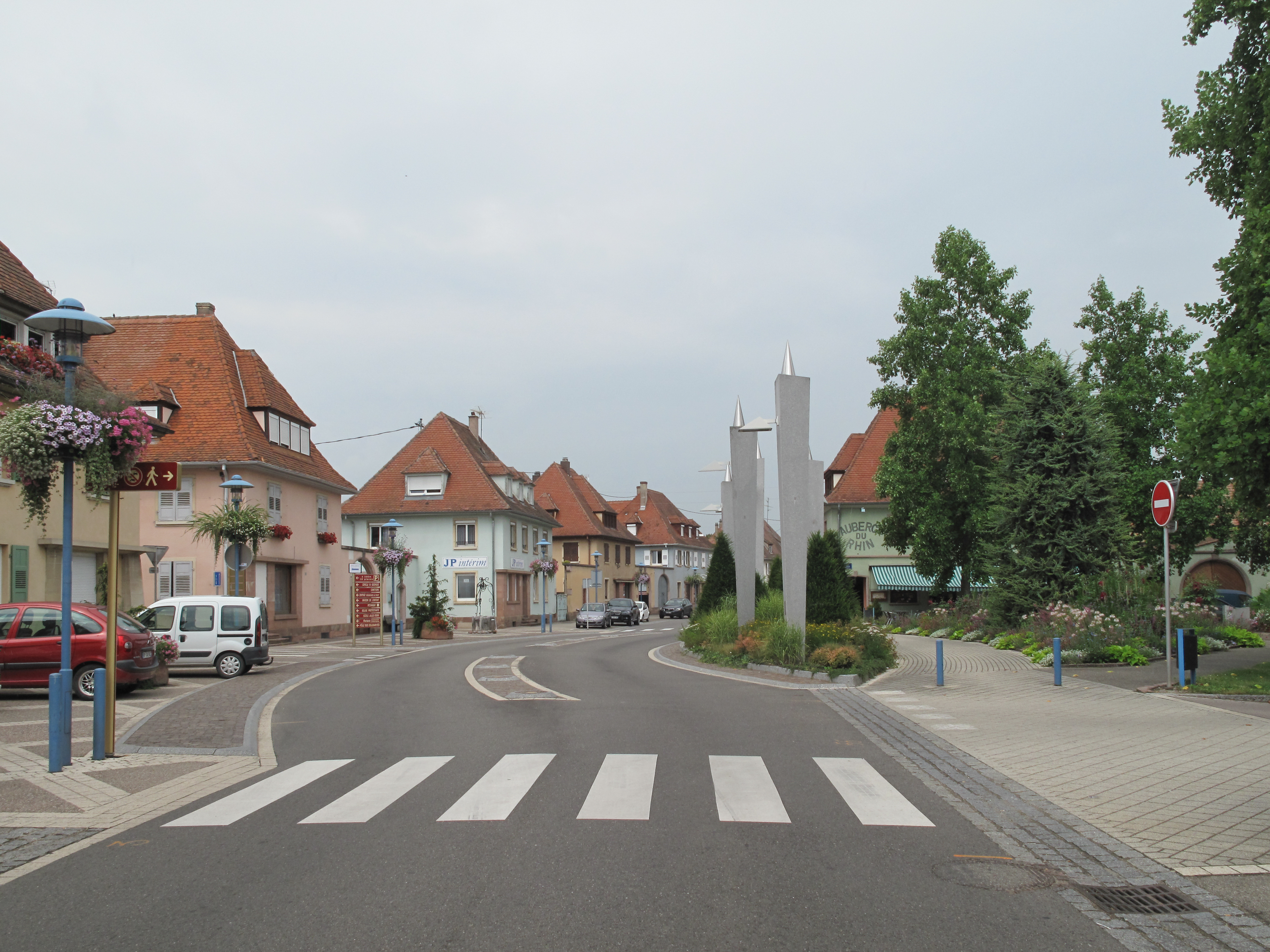
Rue du Maréchal Foch near Rue Clemenceau

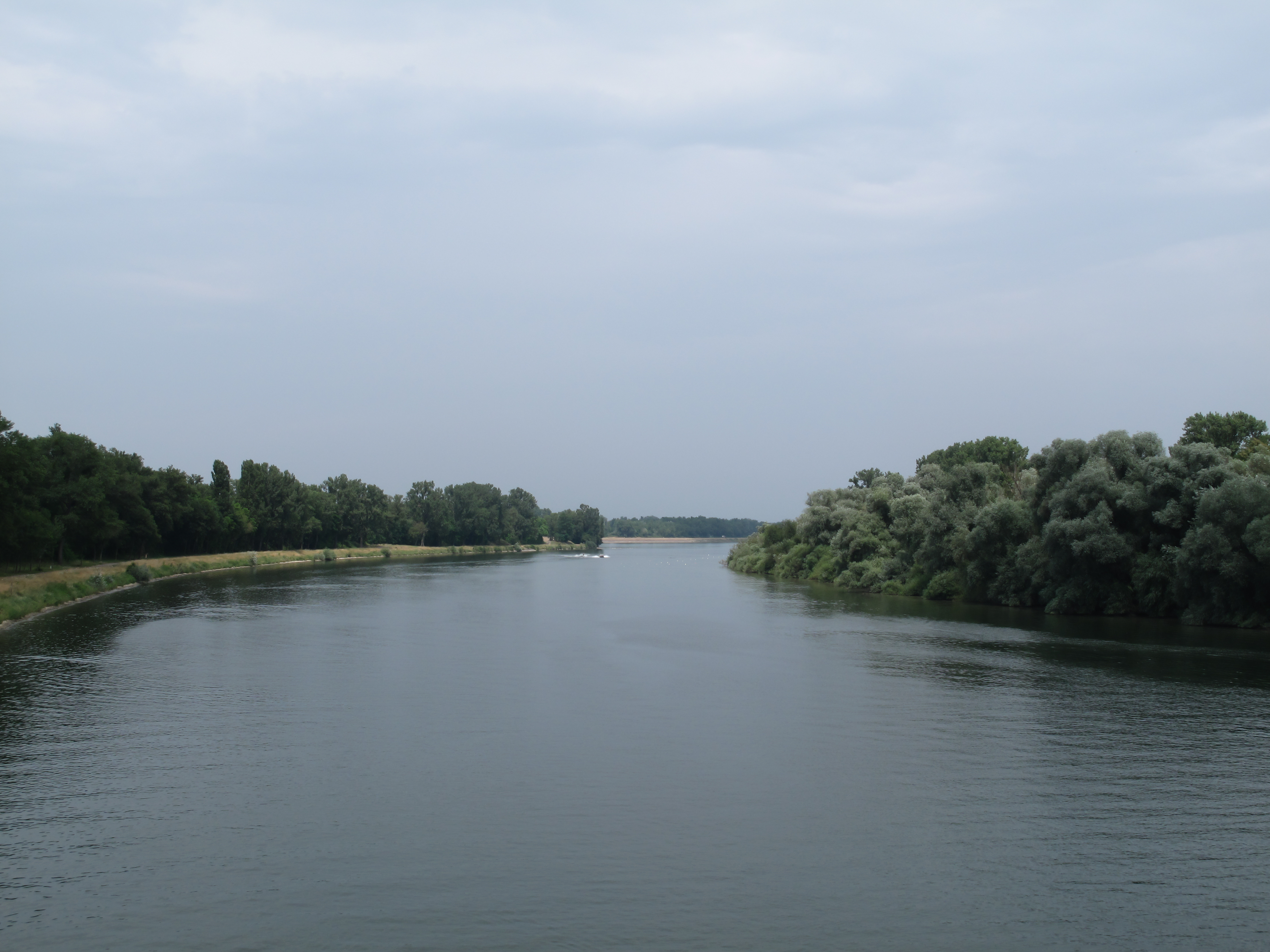
The Rhine near Marckolsheim

== See also ==
- Communes of the Bas-Rhin department
