= List of gardens of Alsace =

The gardens of Alsace listed and described below are the most outstanding among those gardens in Bas-Rhin and Haut-Rhin in the French region of Alsace that are classified as Jardins Remarquables, "Remarkable Gardens of France", by the French Ministry of Culture and the Comité des Parcs et Jardins de France.

== Gardens of Alsace ==
=== Bas-Rhin ===
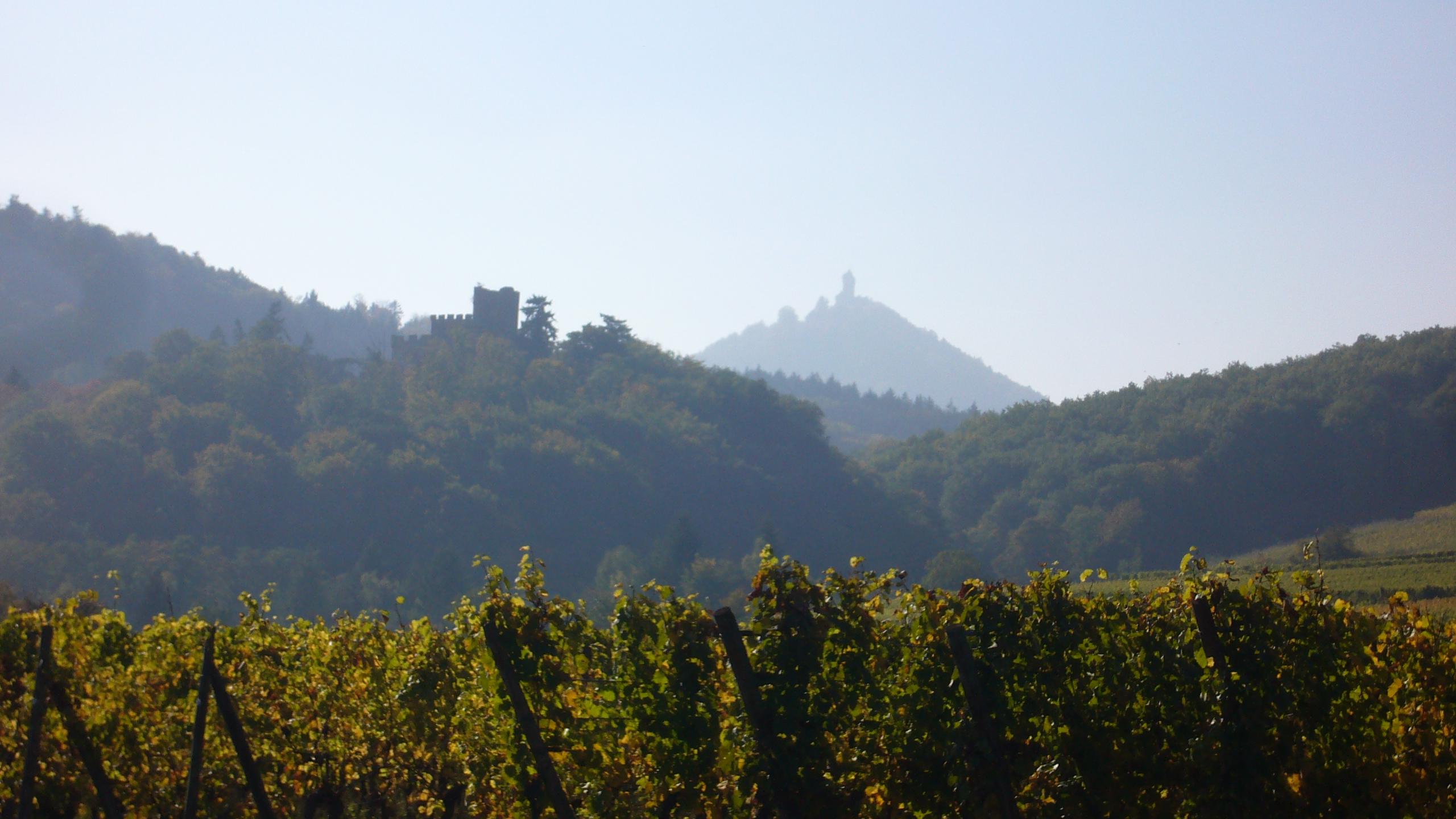
View of the chateaux of Kintzheim and of Haut-Koenigsbourg from the road between Châtenois and Kintzheim

- Kintzheim – The Park of ruins of the Château de Kintzheim. In 1802 Matthieu de Favier, a future baron of the French Empire, bought a former feudal domain and a ruined 12th-century castle on a mountain, and built a mansion in the new Directory style. In 1803–1807, he created a romantic French landscape garden, or jardin tableau, to highlight the view of the ruined castle, inspired by the paintings of Nicolas Poussin, Claude Lorrain, and Hubert Robert.
- Kolbsheim – The Garden of the Château of Kolbsheim. Located 15 kilometers southwest of Strasbourg, overlooking the plain of Alsace. The chateau has two wings, the oldest built in 1703. The upper part of the garden is a geometric Garden à la française parterre garden, decorated with ponds, fountains, hedges and sculpted trees. The lower part is an English park, with many hundred-year-old trees. Much of the garden was destroyed in the First World War, but was restored by the Grunelius family, the present owners.
- Ottrott – The Domaine of Windeck. The house was built by an Alsatian nobleman, Joseph Pescalis, in 1770. The park was begun by Armand Theodore de Partein in 1835. It built in the romantic style, with clusters of trees, ponds and views of the ruined castle of Ottrott. Later trees from America and Asia were added. It includes a beech tree 20 meters high, several sequoia trees fifty meters high and four meters in diameter; American oak trees; cryptomeria trees from Japan; and groves of bamboo. In spring the garden has colorful displays of rhododendrons.
- Plobsheim – The Garden of Marguerite. A small English "secret" garden created by Marguerite and Michel Goetz in 1990, in the heart of the Alsatian village of Plobsheim. The garden features a stream, bridge, fountain, 2000 varieties of plants, and 150 varieties of old roses.
- Saverne – The Botanical Garden of the Saverne Pass. An enclave in the Vosges Forest, featuring local trees, bushes and herbaceous plants in their natural setting. The garden is also known for its bracken, iris from Siberia, and its collection of carnivorous plants.
- Strasbourg – The Botanical Gardens of the Université Louis-Pasteur were founded by the French Academy of Sciences in 1619, and were the second-oldest botanical gardens in France. During the Franco-Prussian War of 1870, the gardens were turned into a cemetery and largely destroyed. The gardens were recreated between 1880 and 1884. Today the gardens, located on 3.5 hectares, have 6000 species of plants, including a collection of rare trees from around the world, including a Giant Sequoia (Sequoiadendron) from the Sierras of California; a massive pecan tree; and a walnut tree from the Caucasus. Greenhouses shelter a remarkable collection of tropical plants, including giant waterlily (Victoria regia) from the Amazon River basin.
- Uttenhoffen – The Garden of La Ferme Bleue. A modern garden built around a farm from the time of the Thirty Years War in the 17th century, whose buildings, like those of other Protestant farms of the time, were painted blue. The garden features sculpture, fruit trees and fountains, and colorful seasonal displays of flowers. The garden was created by landscape architect Jean-Louis Cura.

=== Haut-Rhin ===
- Guebwiller – The Park of the Marseillaise is a public botanical garden and arboretum in the center of the town of Guebwiller, created by landscape designer Édouard André between 1897 and 1899. It contains a large fountain, bandstand, a great variety of trees, rhododendrons and roses, and colorful seasonal flower beds of begonias, dahlias and iris.
- Husseren-Wesserling – Parc of Wesserling. Created beginning in 1699 at the site of a hunting lodge of the prince-abbey of Murbach, the garden contains formal French gardens and an English park, as well as contemporary statues. Trees include a giant Giant Sequoia (Sequoiadendron), Virginia tulip tree (Liriodendron sp.), red oak (Quercus sp.), cypress, linden (Tilia sp.), maple (Acer sp.), and acacias (Acacia sp.); and many kinds of seasonal flowers.
- Mulhouse – The Zoo and Botanical Park of Mulhouse Sud-Alsace The park was created in 1868 as a romantic landscape garden, with a zoo whose collection included kangaroo, deer and birds. Today the zoo has more than 1200 animals, and is dedicated to preserving rare species of plants and animals. It contains many species of tropical birds and monkeys, 400 kinds of iris in spring and dahlias in summer, and topiary trees shaped into fantastic forms. It also features a garden of the senses for the blind, with signs in braille and plants chosen for their smell and touch.
- Riedisheim – Park Alfred Wallach. Created in 1935 by the Parisian landscape architect Achille Duchêne, the park has all the elements of a classic French garden; a large lawn; ornamental flower beds bordered by hedges; a rose garden with 136 varieties; a salle de repos ("place of repose") with statues and trees; a basin and fountain; a small maze; stairways connecting the different parts of the garden; and tree-shaded allées.
- Ostheim – Park de Schoppenwihr. Created in 1840 as a large romantic park to frame a castle, the garden is a series of spaces that appear as natural as possible. Achille Duchêne redesigned it in 1930 and it was Badly damaged during the battle of Colmar in 1945. Today, the castle is gone and the park is finding a new dimension as an art garden. The park 40 hectares, contains giant and rare trees, 5 lakes, a river, a forest, fields and meadows.

== See also ==
- Gardens of the French Renaissance
- Garden à la française
- French landscape garden
- Gardens in France

== Bibliography ==
- Michel Racine, Jardins en France — Guide illustré,, Actes Sud, 1999.
- Lucia Impelluso, Jardins, potagers et labyrinthes, Éditions Hazan, Paris, 2007.
