= Château de Kintzheim =

Castle in Grand Est, France

Coordinates: 48°15′23″N 7°23′12″E

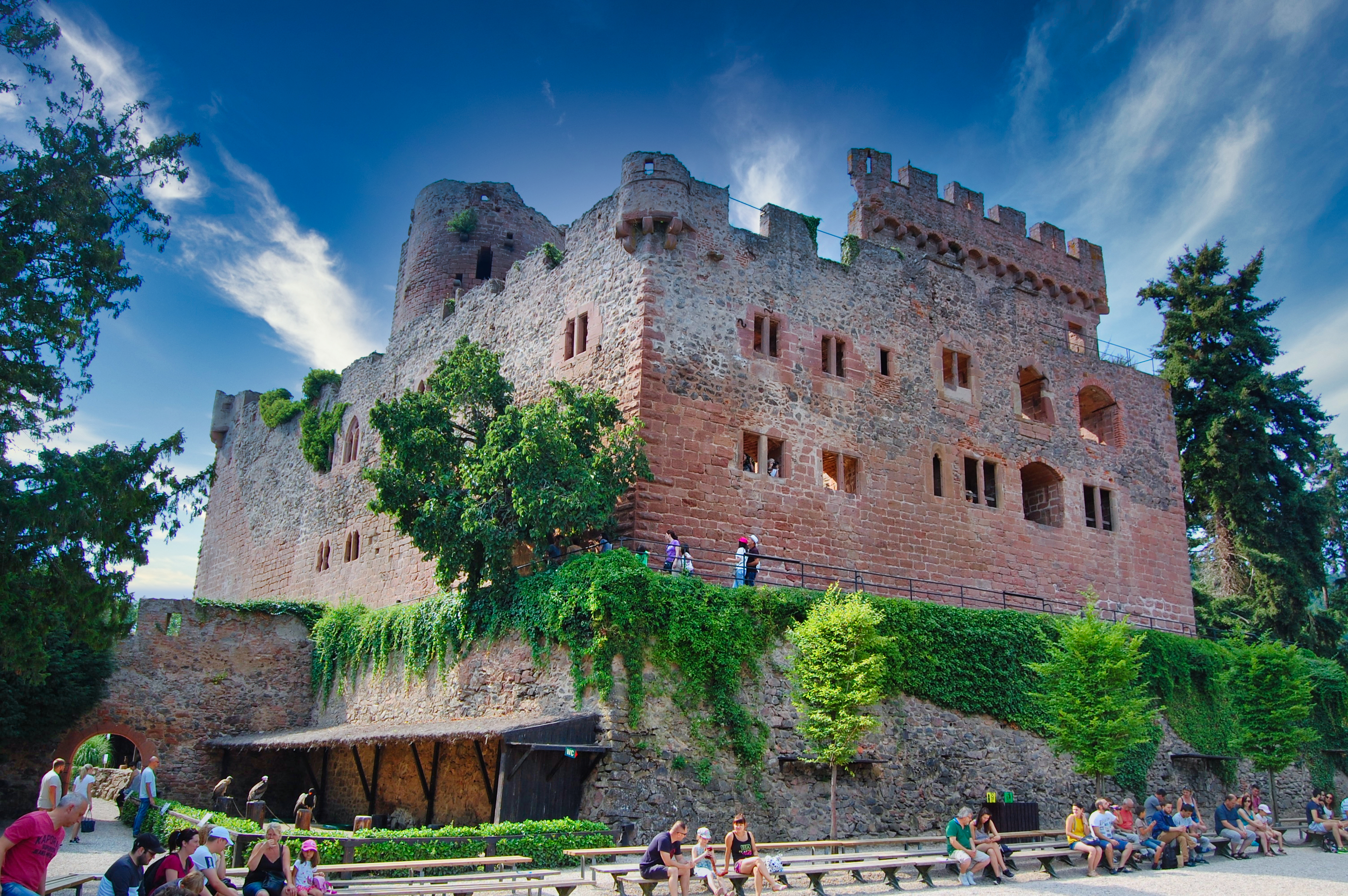
Château de Kintzheim

The Château de Kintzheim is a castle in the commune of Kintzheim in the Bas-Rhin département of France dating from the 12th century. The ruin of the castle dominate the village of Kintzheim.

== History ==
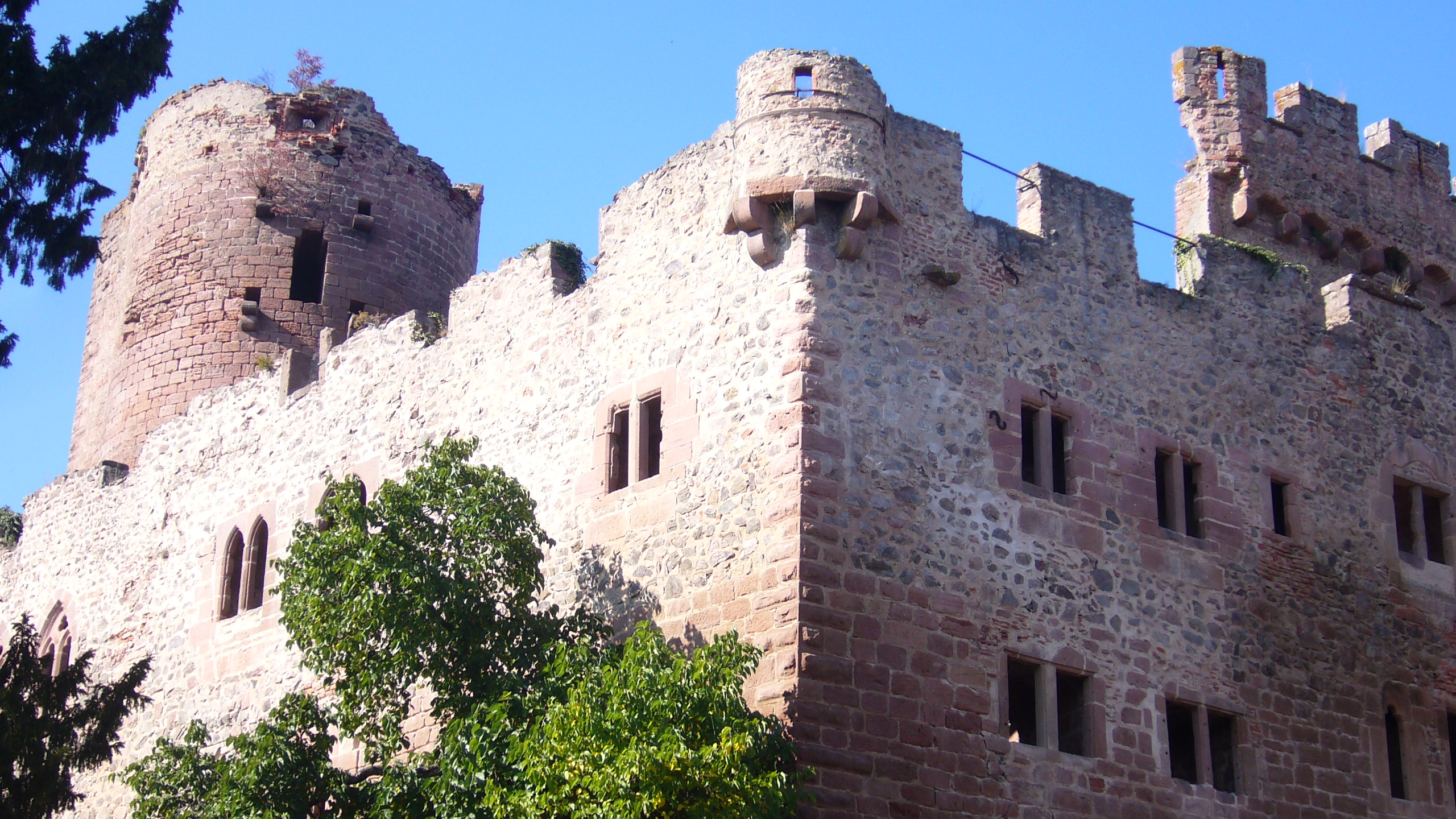
Ruins of the Château de Kintzheim

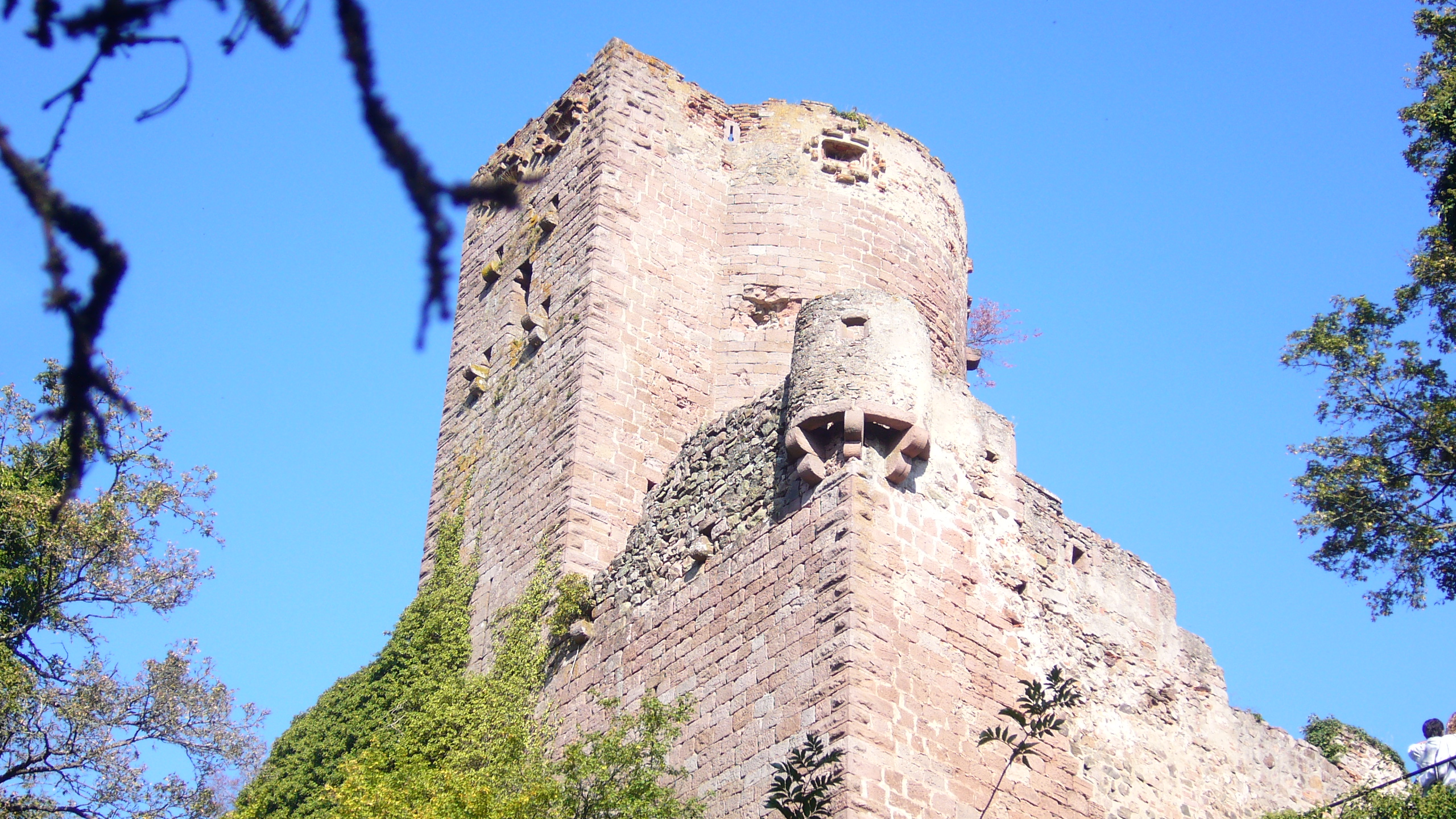
Keep of the Château de Kintzheim

Kintzheim was known in the 6th century under the name of Regis Villa. The Merovingian kings had made it into the center of a vast domain including the valley of the Liepvre River and the forests of Haut-Koenigsbourg.

- In 774, the emperor Charlemagne made a gift to the Abbey of Liepvre of one part of his forests at Gunigesheim (the former name of Kintzheim).
- In 775, Charlemagne spent the Christmas holidays in the Palatium selestatis, probably located at Kintzheim.
- In 843, the Emperor Lothair I, the grandson of Charlemagne, gave Kintzheim to Erchangar, the Count of Nordgau and father of Richarde, the future abbess of Andlau.

=== From the 12th to the 16th centuries ===
The construction of the castle began around 1250 on the order of Emperor Frederick II of Hohenstaufen. The keep and the rampart which belongs to it were finished at the end of the 13th century. The residential structures were built during the 14th and the 15th centuries. In 1341, Emperor Louis IV, known as "The Bavarian", gave the village of "Kinsen" to the town of Sélestat.

In 1492, on the order of Emperor Frederick III of Habsburg, the landvogt of Alsace, Gaspard de Morimont, sold the castle to the town of Sélestat.

=== In the 17th and 18th centuries ===
- In 1633, the castle was partly destroyed by the Swedes during the Thirty Years' War.
- In 1649, the town of Sélestat sold the castle for 3,000 florins to J. G. de Gollen, a former mayor of the town, who had been the minister of Ferdinand III of Habsburg to the Peace of Westphalia, which ended the Thirty Years' War.
- Between 1650 and 1670, J. G. de Gollen restored the residential buildings and the chapel, but never actually lived in there.
- Between 1760 and 1780, the last resident of the castle was a hermit monk who took care of the chapel.

=== 18th and 19th centuries ===
Taken care of during the 18th century by J. G. de Gollen, then by the marquis de Broc, his heir, the castle was abandoned following the French Revolution of 1789. The roofs disappeared around 1830. In 1801, the marquis de Broc put it up for sale. The town of Sélestat tried to regain possession of the property. In 1807, a decree of Emperor Napoleon I gave the Château de Kintzheim to Mathieu de Favier, who was obliged to pay 2,000 silver marks to the town of Sélestat to settle their claim.

=== 19th and 20th centuries ===
In 1802, the future Baron of the Second Empire, Gaetan Mathieu de Fabvier, bought the castle, and below it he built a manor house in the Directory style. Between the two structures he built a park in the English style, which today is classified by the French Ministry of Culture. as one of the Notable Gardens of France. He created a romantic landscape garden, or jardin tableau, to highlight the view of the ruined castle, inspired by the paintings of Nicolas Poussin, Claude Lorrain and Hubert Robert.

The family of Mathieu de Fabvier was close to the family of a Minister of Finance of France, Jean-Georges Humann (1780-1842), whose descendants later became responsible for preserving the Château de Kintzheim.

During the 19th century, the romantic movement brought medieval castles back into style. Many castles in France were restored by Viollet-le-Duc while in Germany Bodo Ebhardt restored many castles, including the castle of Haut-Koenigsbourg, inaugurated by the Emperor William II of Germany in 1908. In 1876, German architects carried out a consolidation of the ruins of Kintzheim.

- In 1945, during the Second World War battle for Alsace, the castle was used as an observation post, and the tower was hit by artillery shells.
- In 1965, the ruins were classified as a monument historique by the Ministry of Culture.
- In 1968, "The Eagle's Nest" was installed at the ruins, and became a tourist attraction drawing about 150,000 visitors each year.

== The Château de Kintzheim today ==
Since 1968, the castle features "La volerie des aigles" (Eng: The Eagles' Nest), which presents species of predatory birds, such as eagles, falcons and vultures, which are in danger of extinction. Spectators can attend daily flights of the birds.

== See also ==
- Kintzheim
- List of castles in France
