= Château Fabvier =

Château in Bas-Rhin, Alsace, France

Coordinates: 48.252°N 7.391°E

The Château Fabvier is a château situated in Kintzheim, Bas-Rhin, Alsace, France. The building with its grounds and park was registered as a monument historique in 1992.

The château was built in the 13th century, but was entirely modernised and refurbished in Neo-Classical style in the early 19th century. It stands in a park and gardens in the English manner.
