= Ludger Fischer =

German historian

Ludger Fischer (born 30 October 1957 in Essen) is a German historian on building history, reviewer of contemporary architecture and political scientist.

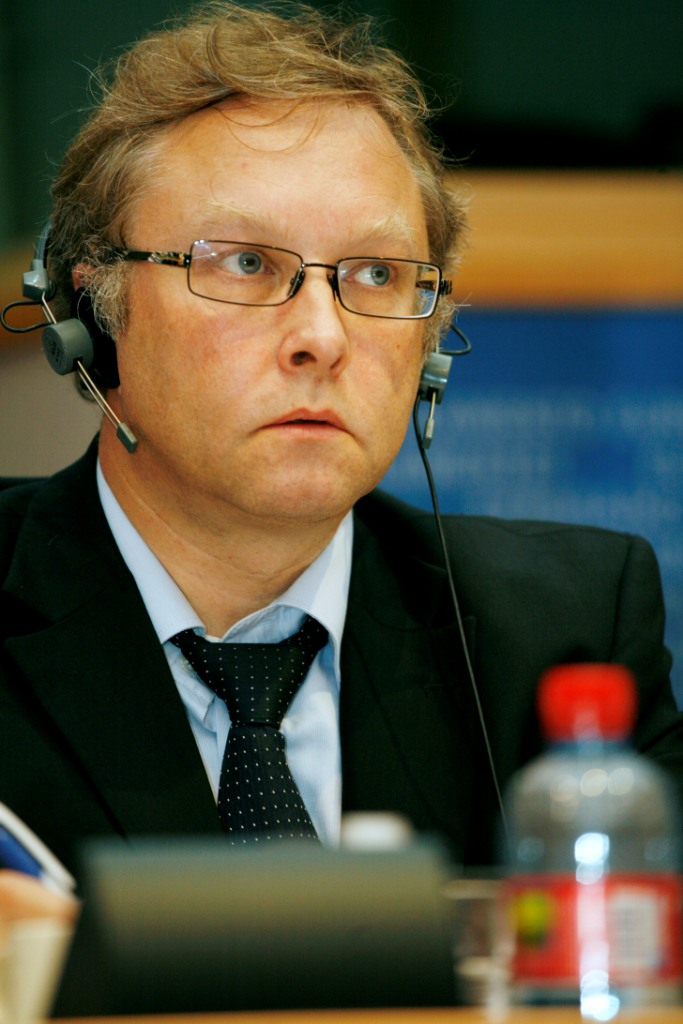
Ludger Fischer in 2008 during the European Parliament, Hearing on Food Labelling

== Work ==
In 1986 Fischer received his doctorate with a dissertation "Über den Denkmalwert sogenannter Zweckbauten" [On the historical value of so-called functional buildings]. He published on castles at the Middle Rhine as Schönburg in Oberwesel and Rheinfels Castle in St. Goar. In his 2010 habilitation treatise Versuche baukünstlerischer Denkmalpflege [The attempts of artistic monument preservation] he examined the work of the architect Bodo Ebhardt (1865–1945). Since 1995 Fischer focuses on contemporary building in the Netherlands and Belgium. He has been a member of the “advisory group on food store chains” of the European Commission, member of the Stakeholder Consultative Platform of the European Food Safety Authority EFSA and several other EU-panels on food safety. Based on his work as political consultant in Brussels he publishes books on the chemical and physical conditions of cooking. Fischer lives in Brussels.

== Reception ==
Fischer's work on Bodo Ebhardt's architecture regarding historical castles received a positive review in the bulletin of the Baden-Württemberg state office for the preservation of monuments. His books on the common errors of cooking practice were also well received by the German press including Frankfurter Rundschau, Financial Times and Hamburger Abendblatt.

== Selected publications ==
- Fischer, Ludger (2011). Küchenirrtümer [Kitchen errors] (in German). Frankfurt am Main: Eichborn. ISBN 978-3-8218-6354-2. Audiobook.
- Kleines Lexikon der Küchenirrtümer [A little encyclopedia of kitchen errors]. Munich: Piper. 2011. ISBN 978-3-492-25829-6.
- Bodo Ebhardt. Versuche baukünstlerischer Denkmalpflege. Restaurierungen, Rekonstruktionen und Neubauten von Burgen, Schlössern und Herrenhäusern von 1899 bis 1935 [The attempts of artistic monument preservation. Restoration, reconstruction and new construction of keeps, castles and manors from 1899 to 1935]. Veröffentlichungen der Deutschen Burgenvereinigung, Reihe A (in German). Vol. 13. Braubach. 2010. ISBN 978-3-927558-27-4.
- Noch mehr Küchenirrtümer [Even more kitchen errors] (in German). Frankfurt: Eichborn. 2010. ISBN 978-3-8218-6513-3.
- Bau- und Kunstdenkmale in Essen-Werden. Essener Spezialführer (in German). Vol. 3 (2nd, revised ed.). Essen: Beleke. 2006. ISBN 3-922785-87-5.
- Eduard Sebald; et al., eds. (1997). Stadt Oberwesel. Die Kunstdenkmäler von Rheinland-Pfalz [Art monuments of the Rhein-Hunsrück district] (in German). Vol. 9. Munich, Berlin: Deutscher Kunstverlag. ISBN 3-422-00576-5.
- Schloss Raesfeld [Raesfeld Castle]. DKV-Kunstführer. Munich, Berlin: Deutscher Kunstverlag. 2001.
- Über den Denkmalwert sogenannter Zweckbauten. Das Erbe der Abtei Werden. Die Königlich-Preußische Strafanstalt in Werden an der Ruhr [On the historical value of so called functional buildings. The heritage of Werden Abbey. The royal Prussian penitentiary in Werden an der Ruhr] (in German). Annweiler: Plöger. 1987. ISBN 3-924574-07-3.

=== As co-author ===
- Fischer, Ludger; Kreß, Hans-Ulrich (2004). Die schönsten Schlösser und Burgen am Niederrhein [The most beautiful castles and keeps on the Lower Rhine] (in German). Gudensberg-Gleichen: Wartberg. ISBN 3-8313-1326-1.

=== As editor ===
- Fischer, Ludger, ed. (2000). Fischlaken. Kleinod am Baldeneysee [Fischlaken, a gem on Lake Baldeney]. Essen historisch (in German). Vol. 4 (2nd ed.). Essen: Beleke. ISBN 3-922785-70-0.
- Fischer, Ludger (1993). Burg und Festung Rheinfels (in German). Neusser Dr. und Verlag. ISBN 3-88094-743-0.
- Josef Heinzelmann; Wilhelm Hermann; Edmund Lahnert; Dieter Metzger (1992). Heimat Oberwesel. Zwischen Liebfrauen und St. Martin. Ein Stadtführer [My home Oberwesel... a city guide]. Oberwesel. ISBN 3-926888-08-3.
- Arte-Fakten. Kunsthistorische Schriften, Thema "Romantik". Annweiler: Plöger. 1987. ISBN 3-89857-013-4.
