= Kintzheim =

Kintzheim Kínze
- Commune
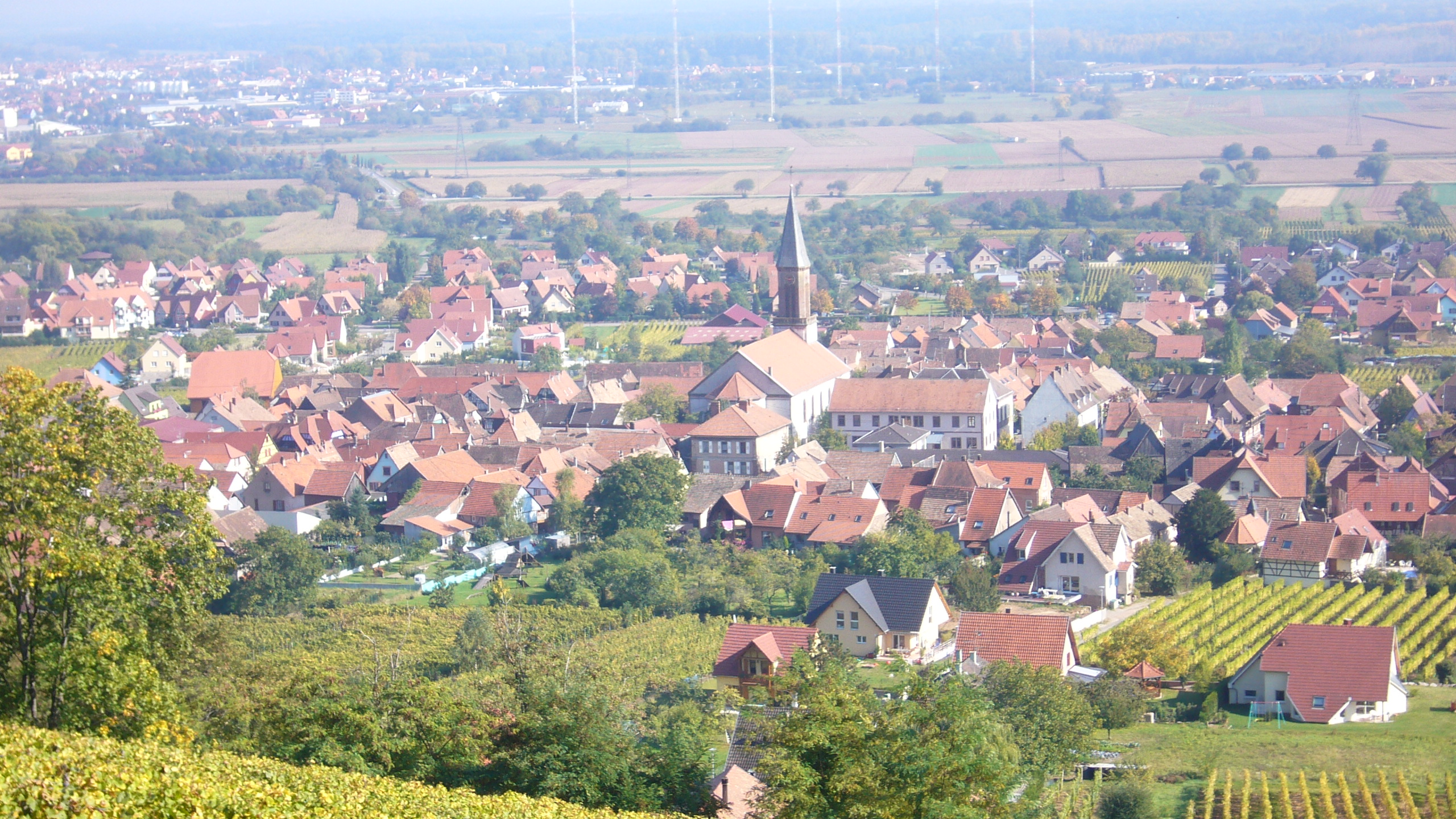
- A general view of Kintzheim

- Coat of arms
- Location of Kintzheim
- Location within France Location within Grand Est
- Coordinates: 48°15′18″N 7°23′51″E
- Country: France
- Region: Grand Est
- Department: Bas-Rhin
- Arrondissement: Sélestat-Erstein
- Canton: Sélestat
- Intercommunality: Sélestat

Government
  - Mayor (2020–2026): Christian Schleifer
- Area^{1}: 18.79 km^{2} (7.25 sq mi)
- Highest elevation: 521 m (1,709 ft)
- Lowest elevation: 176 m (577 ft)
- Population (2023): 1,684
  - Density: 89.62/km^{2} (232.1/sq mi)
- Time zone: UTC+01:00 (CET)
  - Summer (DST): UTC+02:00 (CEST)
- INSEE/Postal code: 67239 /67600
- ^{1} French Land Register data, which excludes lakes, ponds, glaciers > 1 km^{2} (0.386 sq mi or 247 acres) and river estuaries.

Kintzheim (French pronunciation: [kintsaim]; German: Kinzheim) is a commune in the Bas-Rhin department in Alsace in north-eastern France.

The Château de Kintzheim is a well-known landmark in the commune.

== Heraldry ==

The Kintzheim coat of arms is a black eagle on a white background. The bird's talons are highlighted in red, along with its tongue.

The coat of arms is identical to the former coat of arms of nearby Sélestat, of which Kintzheim was a dependency between 1338 and 1791.

== Geography ==
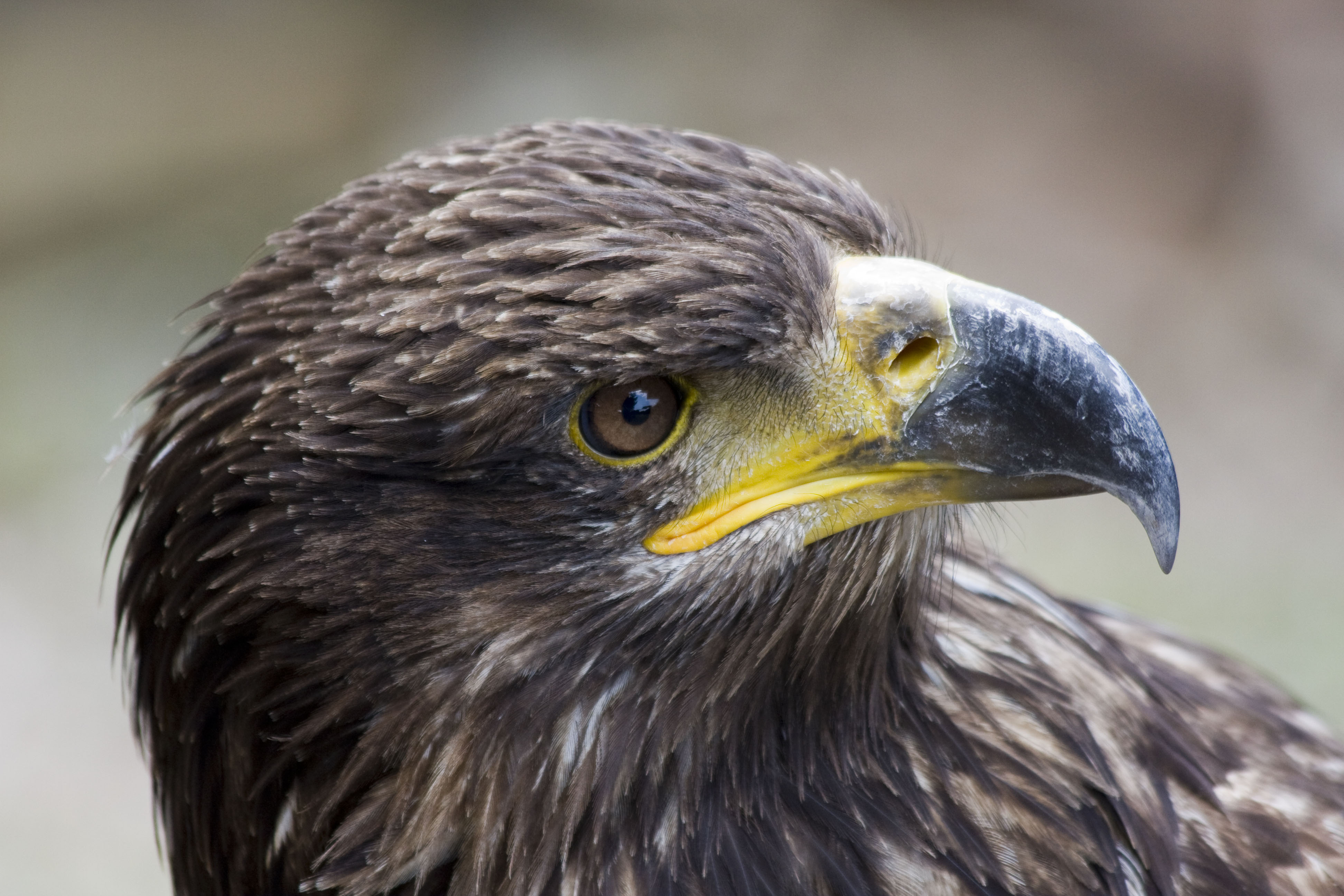
A team member at the Kintzheim Eagle flying centre ("la volerie des aigles")

Kintzheim is positioned on the Alsatian Wine Route, not far from the Château du Haut-Kœnigsbourg. To the north it is dominated by the Hahnenberg Hill (Hill of the heath rooster), and to the south by the Praelatenberg (Prelates' Hill), the community profits from viticulture and the associated commercial benefits of tourism.

The village is surrounded by Sélestat on the east side, Orschwiller to the south and Lièpvre to the west along with La Vancelle and Châtenois to the north. The 13th century Château de Kintzheim overlooks the settlement and marks the edge of the game rich forests of the Vosges Mountains. Wines produced from the vineyards on the Hahnenberg and Praeletenberg hills enjoy the 'grand cru Praletenbourg' designation: of traditional Alsatian style, these wines can be checked out at the local cooperative wine cellars of Orschwiller-Kintzheim.

Tourism is also supported by local wild life, with a stork park and an eagle flying centre (the village coat of arms featuring an eagle) in the commune along with a network of marked walking paths in the surrounding vineyards and forests together with a range of other recreational and leisure facilities.

== History ==
=== Etymology ===
"Kintzheim" may derive from a concatenation of the Germanic words "König" (King) and "Heim" (home/farmstead). Based on that, the name would signify a king's home, which would be consistent with the good defensive position of the castle.

An alternative etymology attaches the Gallic word "cuno" (cone) to the Germanic "Heim". "Cuno" indicates the top of a hill and may be related to a Latin word for the top of a helmet, coming from the Paleolithic root word "Kun"

Around 774 the name was written as "Quningishaim" and in 881 as "Chuniggesheim"

=== Origins ===
The origins of the village are not known. There may have been a settlement here in Neolithic times, but the earliest identified relics date back only to the Roman Empire period. Kintzheim is located on the route of the famous Roman Empire period road that traversed Alsace from north to south. Funerary relics from the 1st and 2nd centuries have been discovered.

=== Merovingian ===
In the 8th century it is recorded that the village was at the centre of a large royal estate. During the time of King Childeric II, the lands and forests of Kintzheim were subject to royal taxation: this was the time when Mayor Wulfoald (or Vulfoald) exercised great power in Austrasia, even after the king came into his majority. Childeric was killed in 675 while hunting: Wulfoald then arranged for the return from Ireland to Austrasia of Dagobert II. Dagobert was king until he, too, was killed on December 23, 779: subsequently Dagobert became known as Saint Dagobert, his day being December 23. Mayor Wulfoald died soon afterwards, in 780.

=== Carolingian ===
With Dagobert's death, part of his property passed to Pepin the Short including the Abbey of Saint Mihiel. Pepin was the father of Emperor Charlemagne who would consolidate much of western Europe into a single empire. One of Charlemagne's palaces, known as "Villa Regia" (Quuningishaim), and translated into subsequent Germanic dialect as "Kunigesheim", was clearly positioned on the slopes of Kintzheim. The emperor was a frequent visitor to the region where as a young man he would hunt in the company of his personal chaplain, the Abbot Fulrad. Before he died in 784, Fulrad had founded monasteries at Lièpvre and at Saint Hippolyte. Fulrad arranged that the abbot of Lièpvre receive a portion of the forest at "Quuningishaim" and several other properties included in the royal hunting forests in the region. A year later, in 775, it is recorded that Charlemagne, returning to Aachen from his conquest of Lombardy, visited the "Palatium Selestatis", his autumn palace most likely on the slopes of the Kintzheim hills. In 781 the emperor bestowed further lands, including the Kintzheim forests, on the priory at Lièpvre.

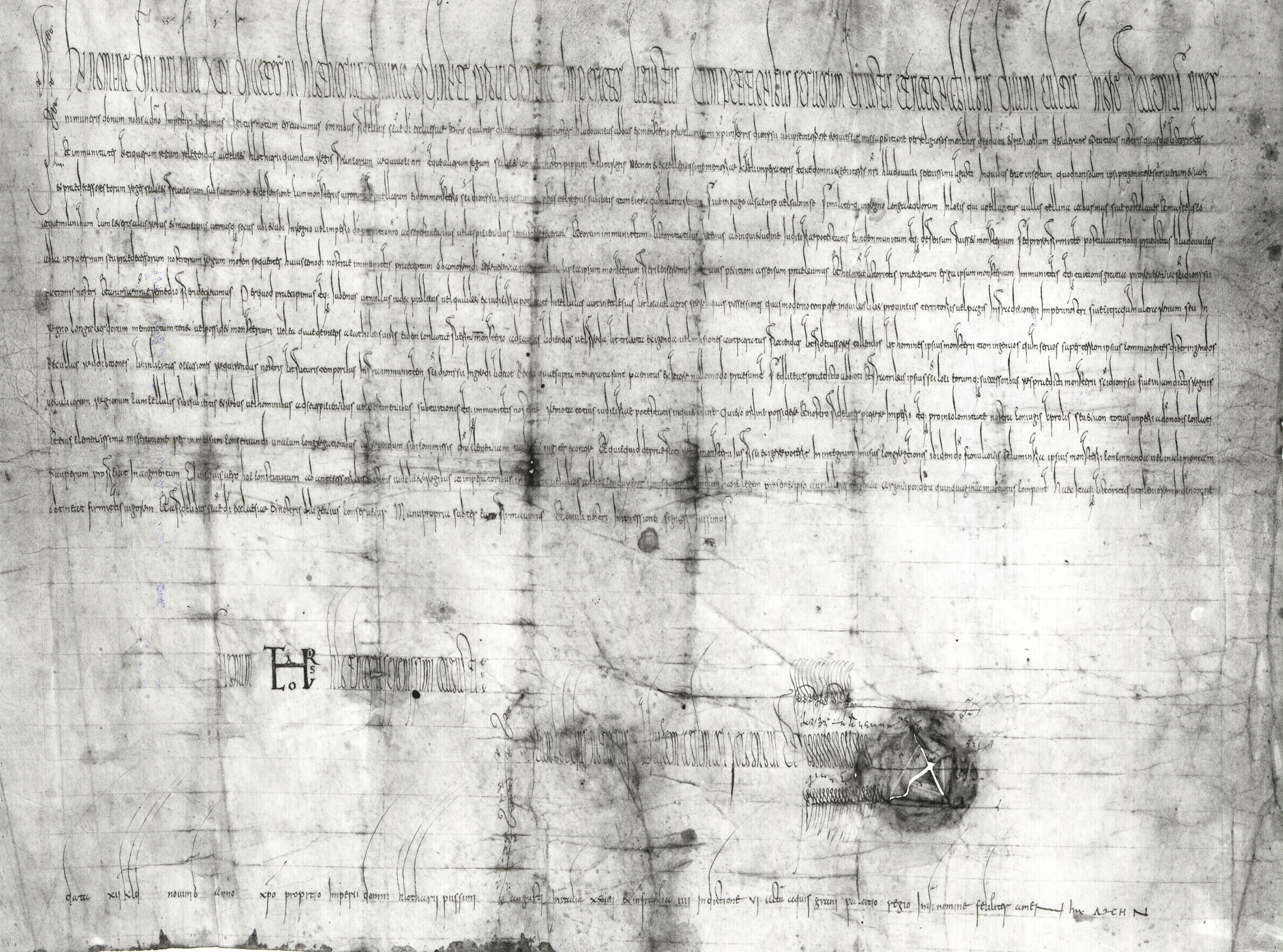
21 October 843: Lothar I confirms his predecessors' dispositions conferring the lands at Lièpvre et à Salonne on the Abbey of Saint-Denis

As part of a land exchange during a lull in a fratricidal war, Charlesmagne's grandson, the emperor Lothar I, in February 843 offered Kunigesheim (Königsheim) to Erchanger de Souabe, Count of Nordgau. The Abbey of Andlau held lands adjoining Lièpvre and positioned at the bottom of the village on land that was part of Kintzheim. These were close to the hospice at Sélestat, known at this time as Abtissinhurst or Graveloch, and which, it is claimed, was part of the court complex (la cour colongères) belonging to the Abbey of Andlau at Kintzheim. Erchangar's daughter, Richardis (Sainte Richarde d'Andlau after her canonisation in 1049), the (ultimately estranged) wife of Charles the Fat, would inherit all these assets.

=== The empire ===
In turn the village passed to the Hohenstaufens and then to the Holy Roman Empire, which is the origin of the imperial eagle on the coat of arms. During the 13th century the German emperors transferred the income of the village to the local noble families, including the Kagens, the Rathsamhausens (then written Racenhuzen) and the Andlaus. From 1267 the castle at Kintzheim was in the possession of the Rathsamhausen family. In 1286 part of Kintzheim was let by the emperor to Hartmann and Egelophe de Rathsamhausen for 150 silver marks. The area was increased in 1299 by a farm at Kintzheim which the Abbey of Senones gave them in fief.

In 1298 the inhabitants of the nearby village of Châtenois, at this time administered by the bellicose Bishop of Strasbourg, torched and devastated the castle at Kintzheim. The Rathsamhausen and Kagen families rebuilt it, however, between 1300 and 1306.

=== Armagnac destruction ===
During the civil war of the early 15th century, Armagnac partisans of the Duke of Orléans torched Scherwiller, Châtenois, Kintzheim, and Saint-Hippolyte.

=== Acquisition by Sélestat ===
In 1338 the nearby town of Sélestat set about buying the lands of Kintzheim from its noble landlords, although the Abbey of Andlau would continue to exercise certain prerogatives including the appointment of the provost until 1534. Louis of Bavaria transferred most of Kintzheim to Sélestat and the Rathsamhausen sold them the rest of the village, retaining only the castle.

From now on Sélestat exercised full control over Kintzheim until several decades after the French Revolution: in the meantime, as far as the records are concerned, Kintzheim tends to share its history with that of Sélestat.

=== The Peasant wars ===
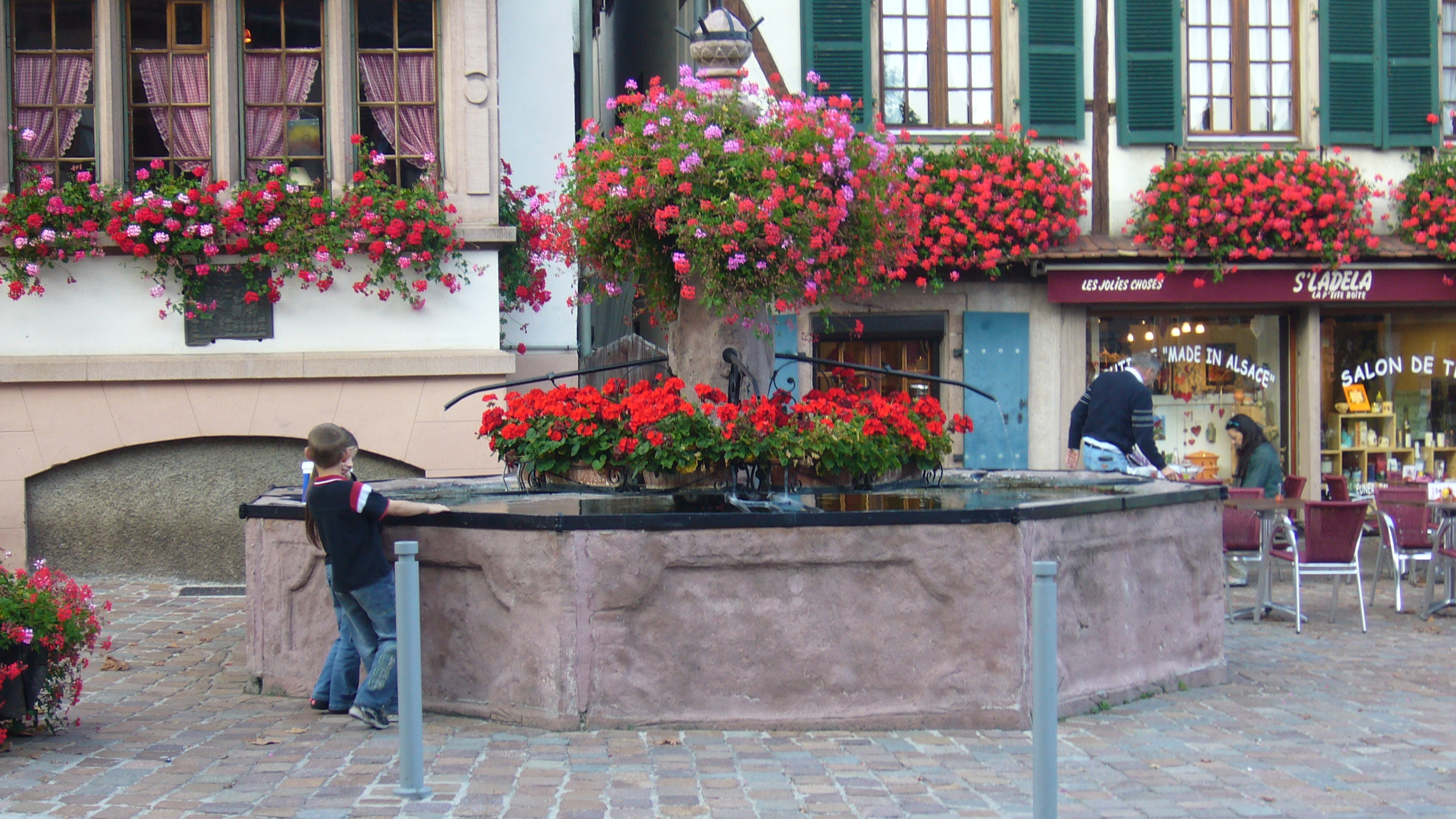
Kintzheim: In earlier centuries the village fountain would have been a meeting point for villagers, but during the twentieth century the arrival of a piped water supply left the fountain playing a largely decorative role.

The war of the Peasants which in this area broke out in 1525 touched the neighbourhood very directly. At Scherwiller the Duke of Lorraine crushed an 'army' of 5,000 peasants and saw to it that the village was (again) torched. The peasant uprising started in several centres including Sélestat, though in reality it had been brewing during a much longer period and over a wider area: the revolt raged across Germanic central Europe for three years. Economic hardship was a key cause of these armed insurrections. Since the previous century Alsace had been ravaged by a succession of military invasions involving the destruction of villages and crops: the burden of homes burned down and of harvests destroyed or stolen was always suffered most acutely by the peasants. In addition to economic shortage and loss must be added the exploitation of the small farmers by the nobility and the monasteries: the result was a growing antagonism towards landowners. In addition to poll taxes and tithes, peasants found themselves increasingly burdened by the additional taxes levied in order to fund international wars and other extravagances of the lords and nobles.

=== Thirty Years' War ===
During the Thirty Years War, the Swedes laid siege to Sélestat. They occupied Kintzheim and left its castle in ruins.

=== The Revolution ===
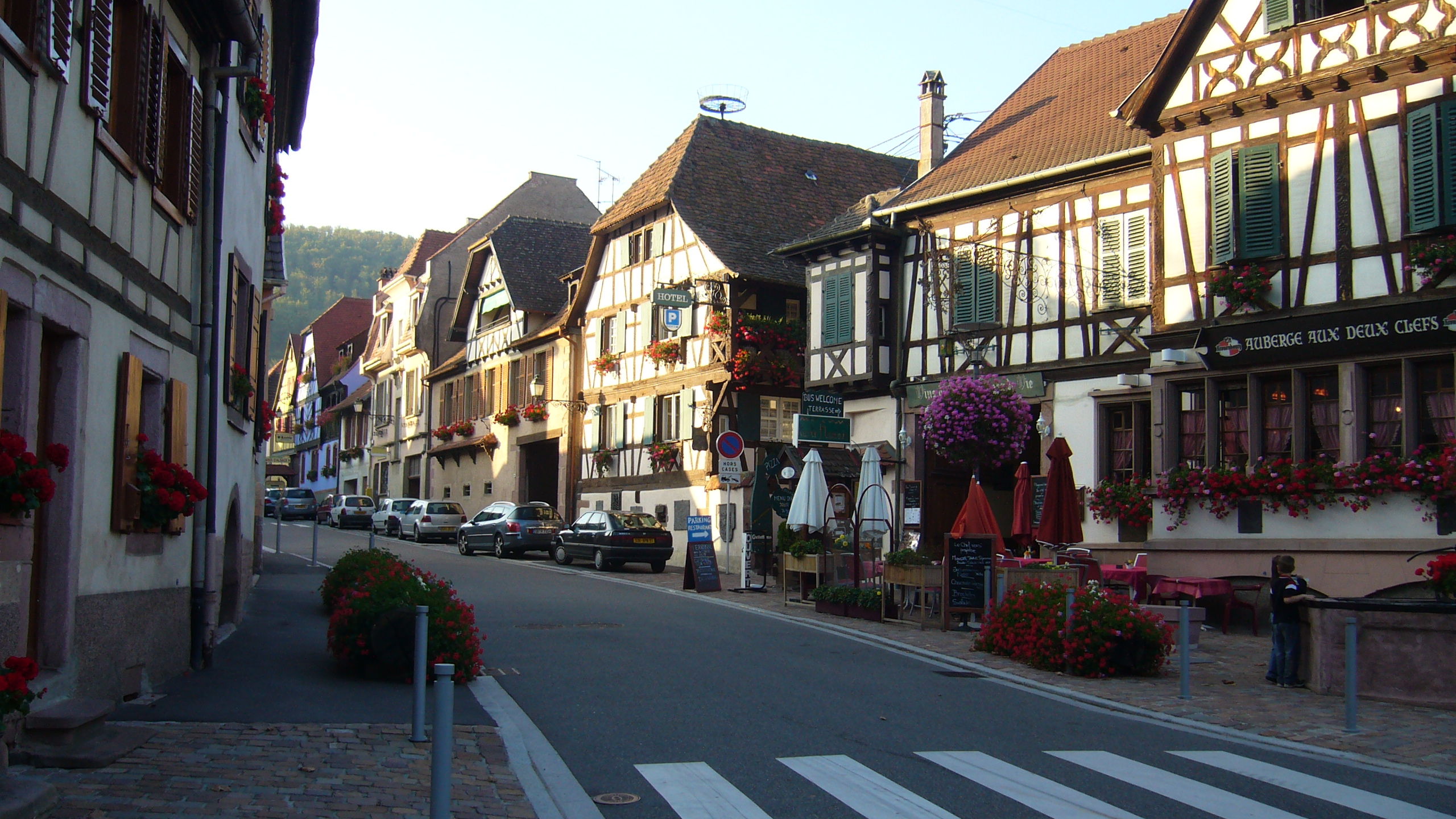
Kintzheim Main street (Rue Charles de Gaulle). The wheel is on the hotel roof in order to persuade storks to build themselves a nest on it.

In common with most of Alsace, Kintzheim's experience of the French Revolution was relatively calm. The two priests were exiled across the river in Baden, from where they may have made clandestine returns visits to Kintzheim where they would have been successfully concealed by villagers. The village still has a small closet with a chair inside it which was constructed to conceal two priests during searches by the National Guard. Any 'trawl' for them was announced so that the priests could be alerted. During the revolution two nuns lived in retirement at Kintzheim. On the eighteenth of Pluviôse, Year II (Revolutionary Calendar) Kintzheim was obliged to provide 12,000 silver pounds in return for valueless Assignats with a face value of 12,000 pounds.

=== Split from Sélestat ===
Following the French Revolution, most rural communes found themselves freed from any former owners. Kintzheim also gained its freedom from the town of Sélestat which had owned it since 1338. However, it was not until 1834, after a legal case that lasted forty years, that Sélestat agreed to give up its rights over the village.

== Education ==
The commune has a single preschool (école maternelle) and a single elementary school.

== See also ==
- Communes of the Bas-Rhin department
