= Bodo Ebhardt =

German architect

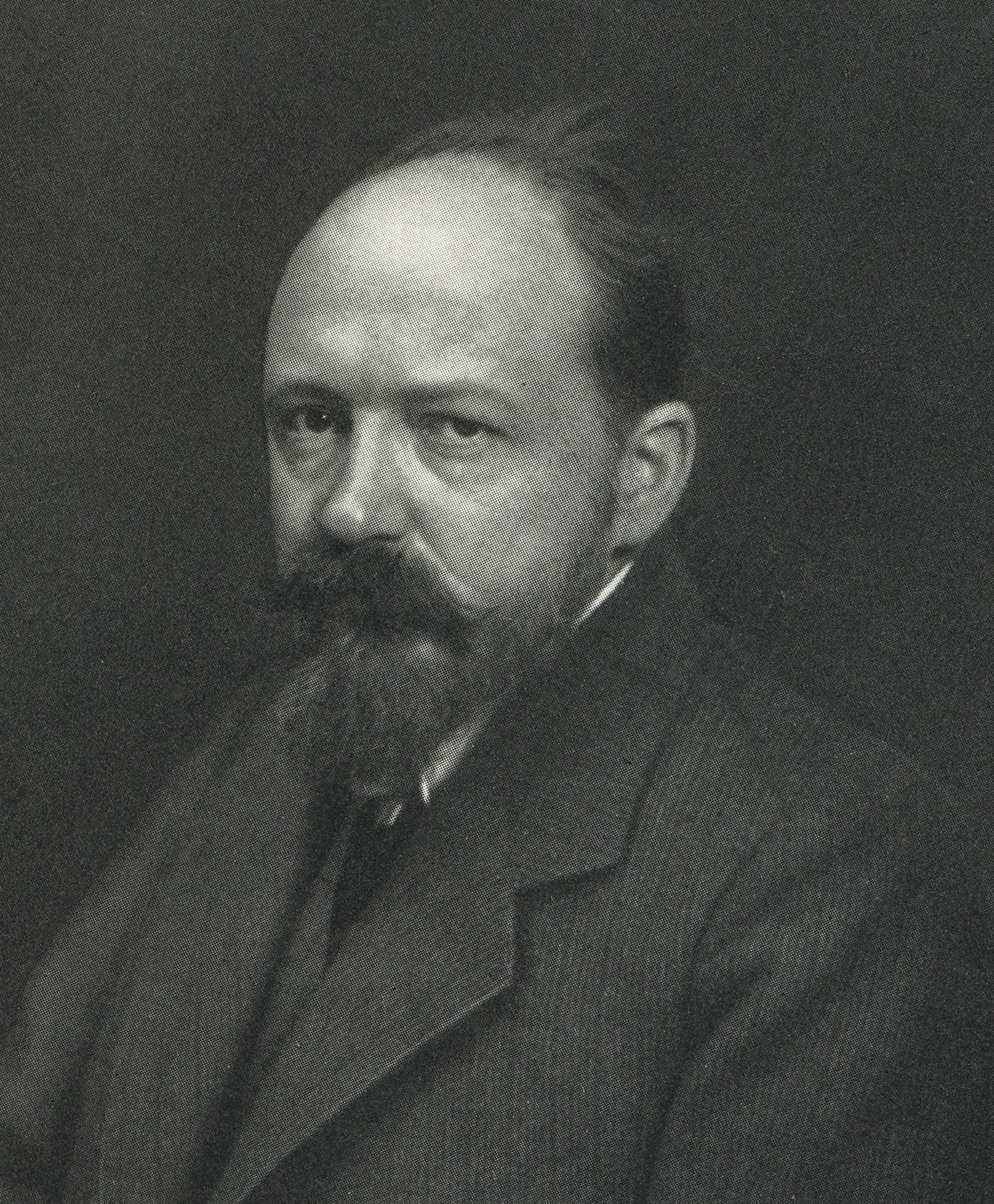
Bodo Ebhardt, portrait by Rudolf Dührkoop, 1912

Bodo Heinrich Justus Ebhardt (5 January 1865, Bremen – 13 February 1945 at Marksburg near Braubach) was a German architect, architectural historian, castle explorer, and founder and longtime president of the German Castles Association (Deutsche Burgenvereinigung).

== Life ==
Ebhardt was the son of Bremen furniture manufacturer and businessman Carl Ebhardt and his wife Agnes (Krollmann) Ebhardt. He attended school in Sankt Goarshausen, where he became fascinated by castles. After graduation he was a commercial apprentice in Magdeburg and Bremen from 1880, but soon gave up this job against the wishes of his parents to self-educate and attended lectures in Berlin. In 1890 he opened his own architectural studio in Berlin. As a castle researcher and restorer, he won the friendship of Kaiser Wilhelm II. He became noted for the reconstruction of numerous castles.

In 1899 he founded the German Castles Association and from 1909 he lived on the Marksburg in Braubach. Ebhardt was a professor and court architect, in 1909 honorary citizen of Braubach, and in 1928 was a founding member of the Association of Friends of Plassenburg. He was also a member of the Berlin Masonic lodge Zum Pegasus.

== Buildings and designs ==
- 1892–1893: Villa Seibt in Berlin-Grunewald
- 1893–1894: Landhaus Ebhardt in Berlin-Grunewald
- 1894: Residential and business complex "Wilhelmshof" in Groß-Lichterfelde near Berlin
- 1894: Log house "Fürstenhof" in Karlshorst near Berlin
- 1894–1895: Stable building of the Villa Färber in Aachen- Burtscheid
- 1895–1896: Schröder-Poggelow House in Berlin-Tiergarten
- 1896: Villa Scheche in Berlin Grunewald
- 1896: Ebhardt residence in Berlin-Tiergarten, Rauchstraße 13
- 1898: Sports memorial in Berlin, demolished 1973
- 1899–1901: Villa Langenscheidt in the "Alsen Colony", Berlin-Wannsee, Colomierstraße 1 (stable building added 1902–1903)
- 1899–1900: Villa Passow/Fulvius/Voss (today Dressler-Verlag) in Heidelberg, Gaisbergstraße 55
- 1900–1934: Restoration of the Marksburg above Braubach am Rhein
- 1901–1908: Restoration of the Hohkönigsburg (French Haut-Kœnigsbourg) in Alsace
- 1901–1902: Villa Cornelius Meyer in Berlin-Grunewald
- 1901–1902: Reconstruction of the Castle Hohenhaus (Herleshausen)
- 1903: War memorial 1870/71 in Braubach
- before 1904: Farm building for Villa Martin in Neubabelsberg
- 1904: Villa Remmer in Berlin Grunewald
- 1904–1906: Expansion of the Castle Landonvillers in Lorraine
- 1905–1906: Restoration of the church hall of Altenburg Castle after a fire
- 1906–1908: New construction of the Hakeburg in Kleinmachnow
- 1906–1908: Restoration and supplementary buildings at Grodziec Castle
- 1906–1925: Restoration and extension of Neuenstein Palace (Hohenlohe)
- 1908–1909: Villa Ribbeck in Berlin-Grunewald
- 1909–1925: Restoration and construction of several new buildings at Veste Coburg
- before 1910: Haus Lucke in Schlettstadt
- 1910: Competition design for a Bismarck National Monument on the Elisenhöhe near Bingerbrück (not awarded). The monument was never constructed.
- 1911–1912: Restoration of Sallgast Palace
- 1911–1913: Expansion of Castle Wommen
- 1912: Restoration of Castle Langenau
- 1912–1913: von der Heydt bank headquarters (so-called "Kleisthaus") in Berlin, Mauerstraße 53
- 1912–1914: New construction of the Wartburg-Gasthof in Eisenach
- 1912–1914: Restoration of Tzschocha Castle
- 1913–1914: Restoration and extension of Schloss Groß Leuthen
- 1913–1916: Princely Court Theater in Detmold
- 1914–1915: Expansion of Allianz Versicherungs-AG in Berlin
- 1914–1925: Free reconstruction of the Kipfenberg Castle
- 1916: Development plan and drafts for the reconstruction of Neidenburg's town hall
- 1920: Attempt to restore Neuhausen Palace
- 1920–1921: Restoration of Kaulsdorf Castle
- 1920–1923: Restoration of Castle Eichicht
- 1921–1923: Restoration of Scharfenstein Castle after a fire
- 1921–1923: Restoration of Creuzburg Castle
- 1922–1927: New construction of the Hornburg on existing foundation walls
- 1922–1928: Expansion of Heimhof Castle
- 1922–1935: Restoration of Gröditz Castle near Weißenberg
- 1926–1927: Petschull House in Diez on the Lahn
- 1929–1930: Restoration of the Gollwitz Mansion
- 1931–1932: Reconstruction of the Arienfels Palace (Schloss Arenfels) near Hönningen on the Rhine
- 1933–1935: New construction of the castle-like Villa Mühlberg in Ohrdruf

== Publications ==
- Ebhardt, Bodo (1904). Die Burgen des Elsass (in German). Berlin.
- Ebhardt, Bodo (1911). Steinerne Zeugen: Wehrbauten Veronas (in German). Berlin-Grunewald: Burgverlag.
- Ebhardt, Bodo (1914). Der Schloßbau (in German). Berlin-Grunewald: Burgverlag.
- Ebhardt, Bodo (1915). Krieg und Baukunst in Frankreich und Belgien (in German). Berlin: Burgverlag.
- Ebhardt, Bodo (1918). Die Zehn Bücher der Architektur des Vitruv und ihre Herausgegeber seit 1484 (in German). Berlin: Burgverlag.
- Ebhardt, Bodo (1925). Deutsche Burgen als Zeugen deutscher Geschichte (in German). Berlin: Zillessen.
- Ebhardt, Bodo (1934). Spanische Burgenfahrt, 1930; ein Reisebericht (in German). Marksburg ob Braubach am Rhein: Burgverlag.
- Ebhardt, Bodo (1932). Schloß Arienfels bei Hönningen am Rhein. Der Bau und seine Geschichte (in German). Berlin: Burgverlag.
- Ebhardt, Bodo (1938). Burg Trifels: Untersuchungen zur Baugeschichte (in German). Burgerverlag.
- Ebhardt, Bodo (1939). Der Wehrbau Europas im Mittelalter (in German). Deutsche Verlagsgesellschaft.

An extensive list of the writings critically annotated by Ludger Fischer can be found in the publication Burgenromantik und Burgenrestaurierung um 1900.

== Gallery ==
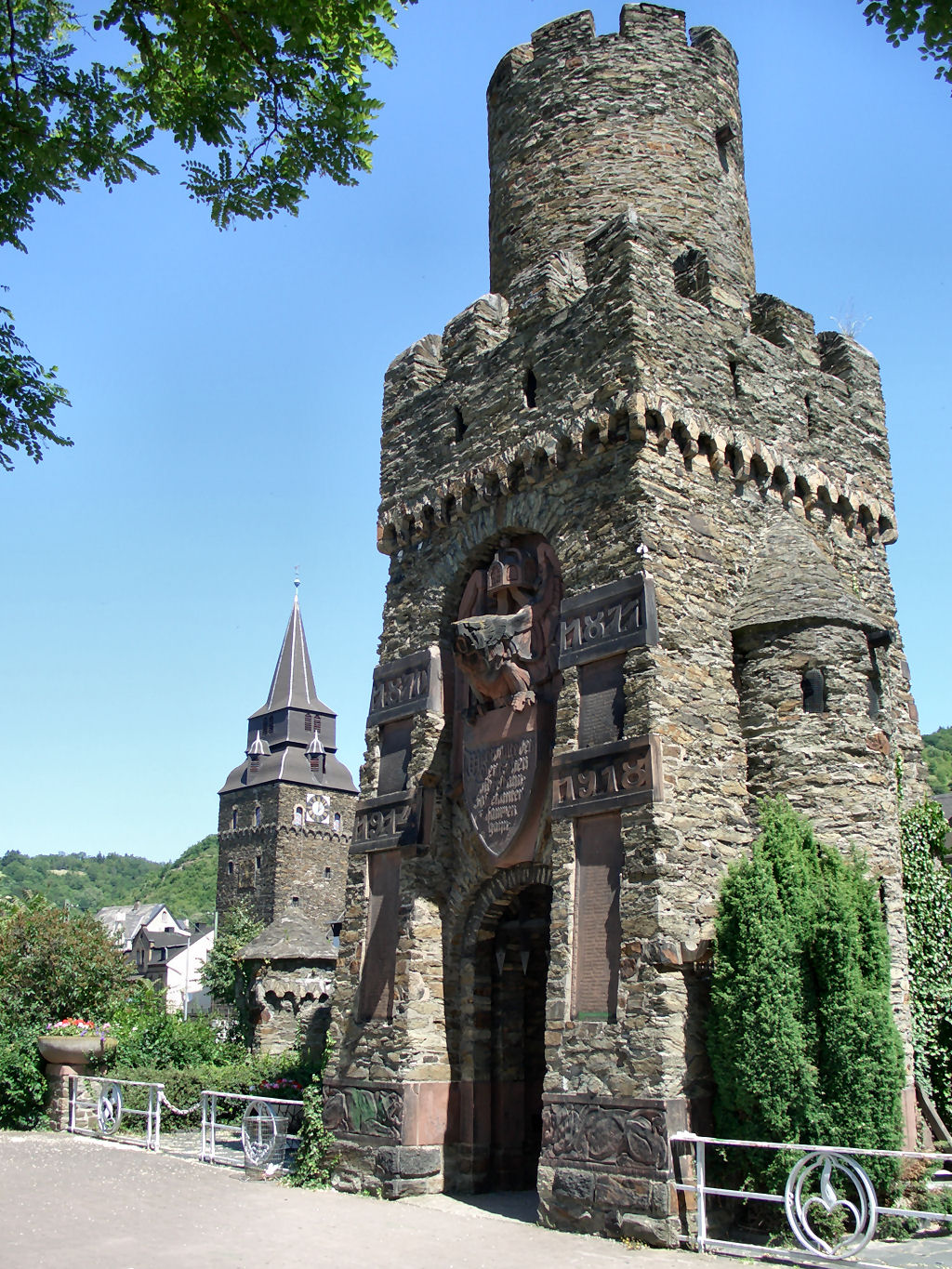
Braubach am Rhein: Franco-Prussian war memorial,
later also rededicated to the fallen of World War I

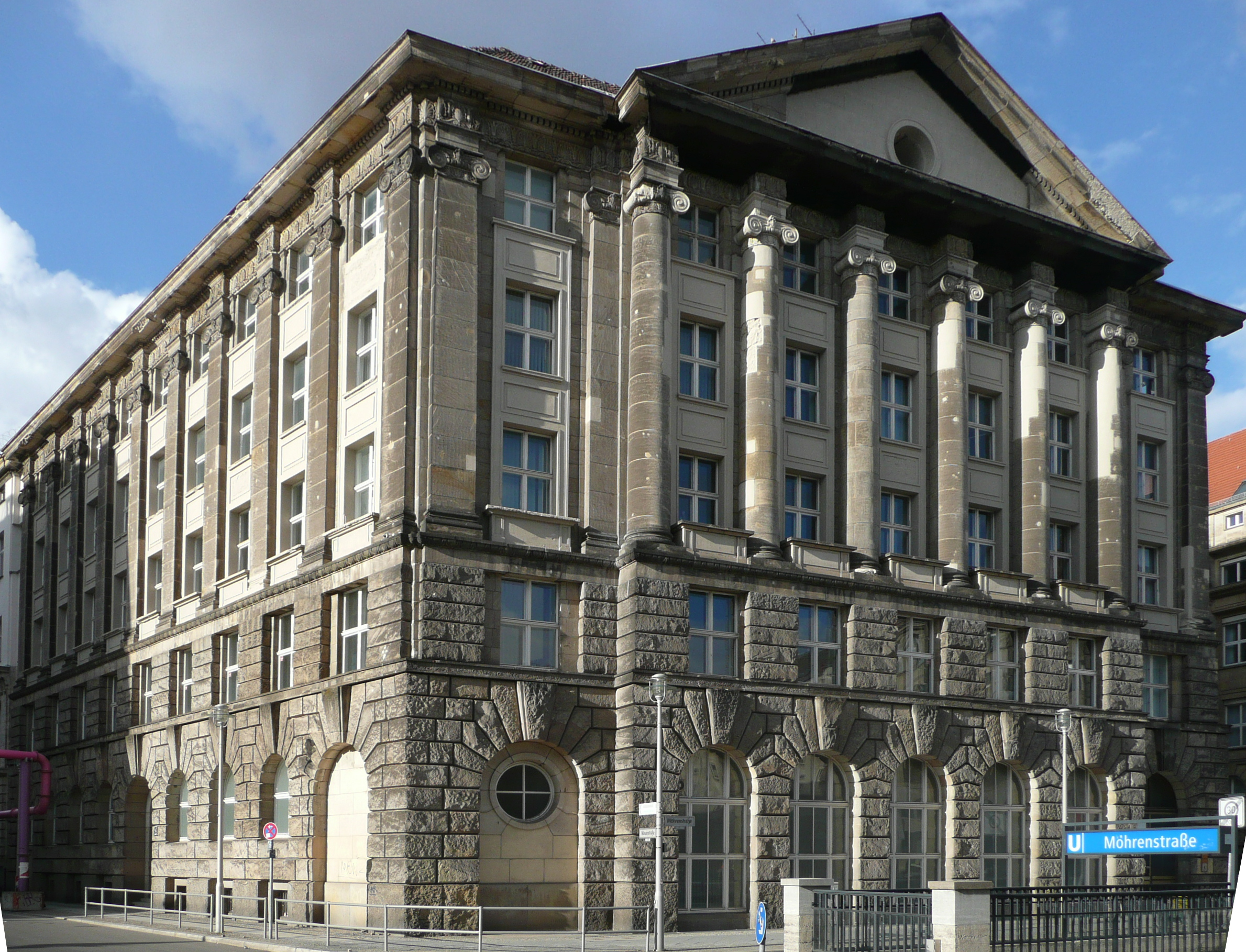
Headquarters of Allianz-Versicherung in Berlin (1913–1916)

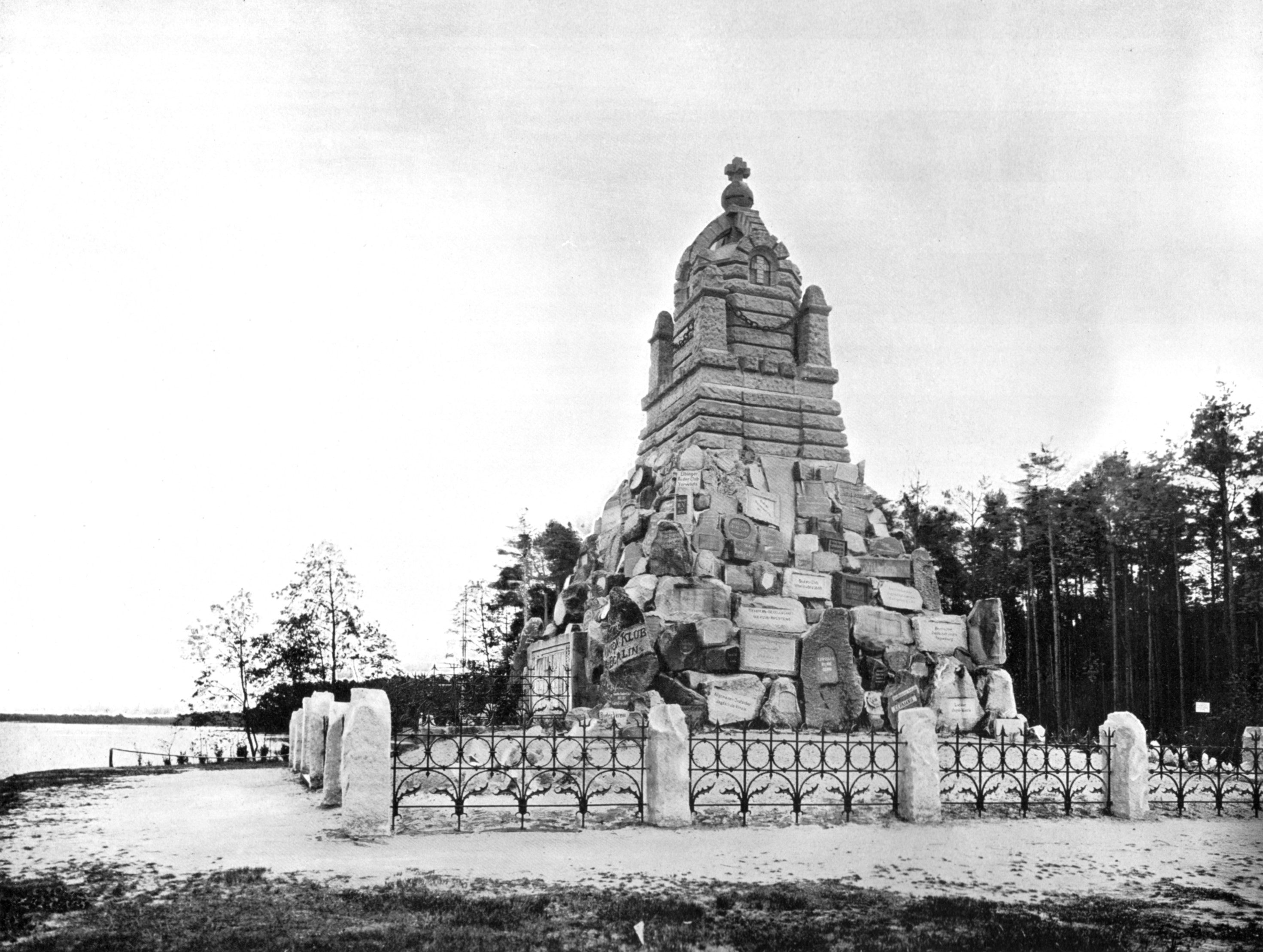
Sportdenkmal Berlin-Grünau

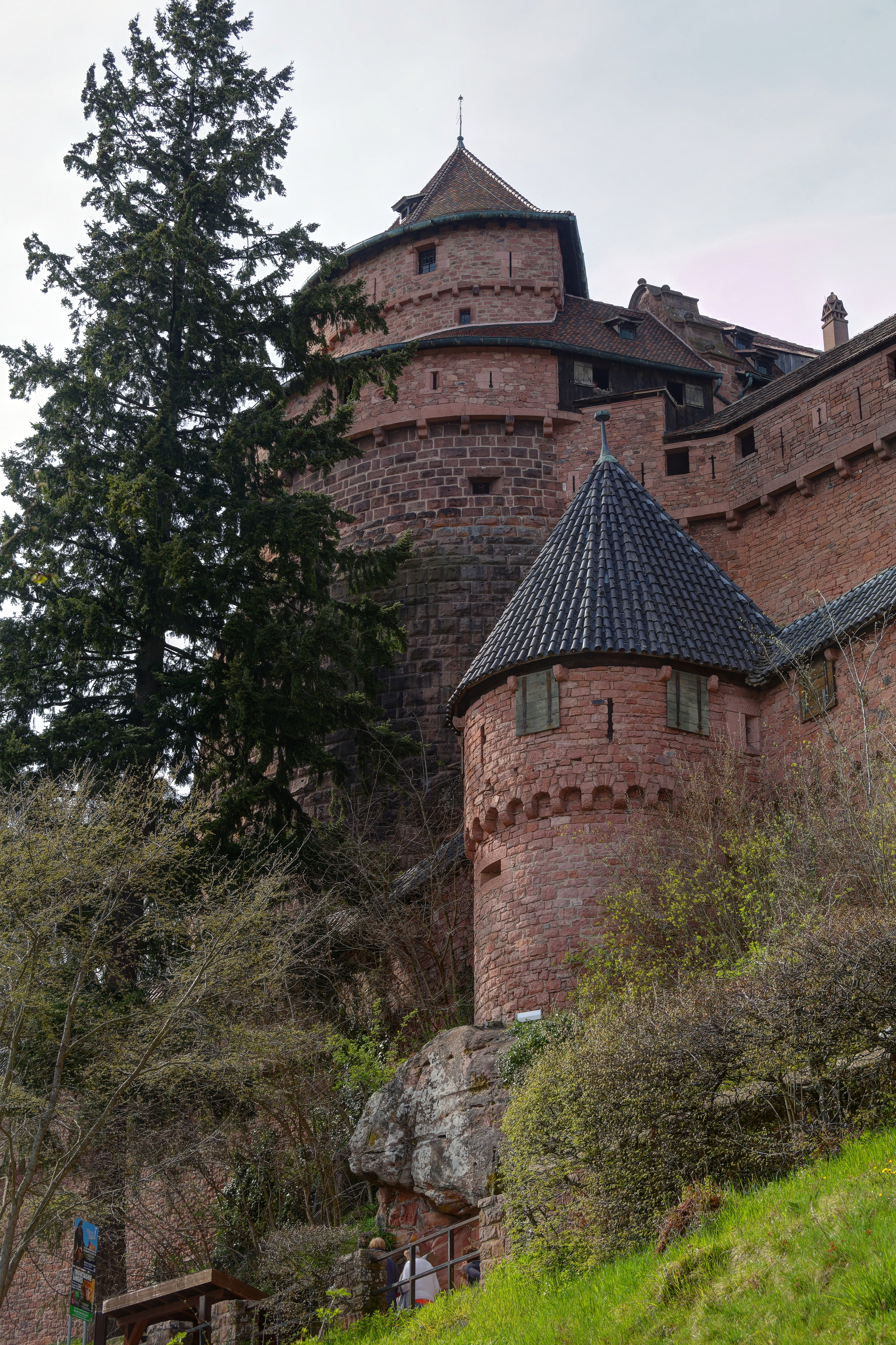
View of Hohkönigsburg in 2016

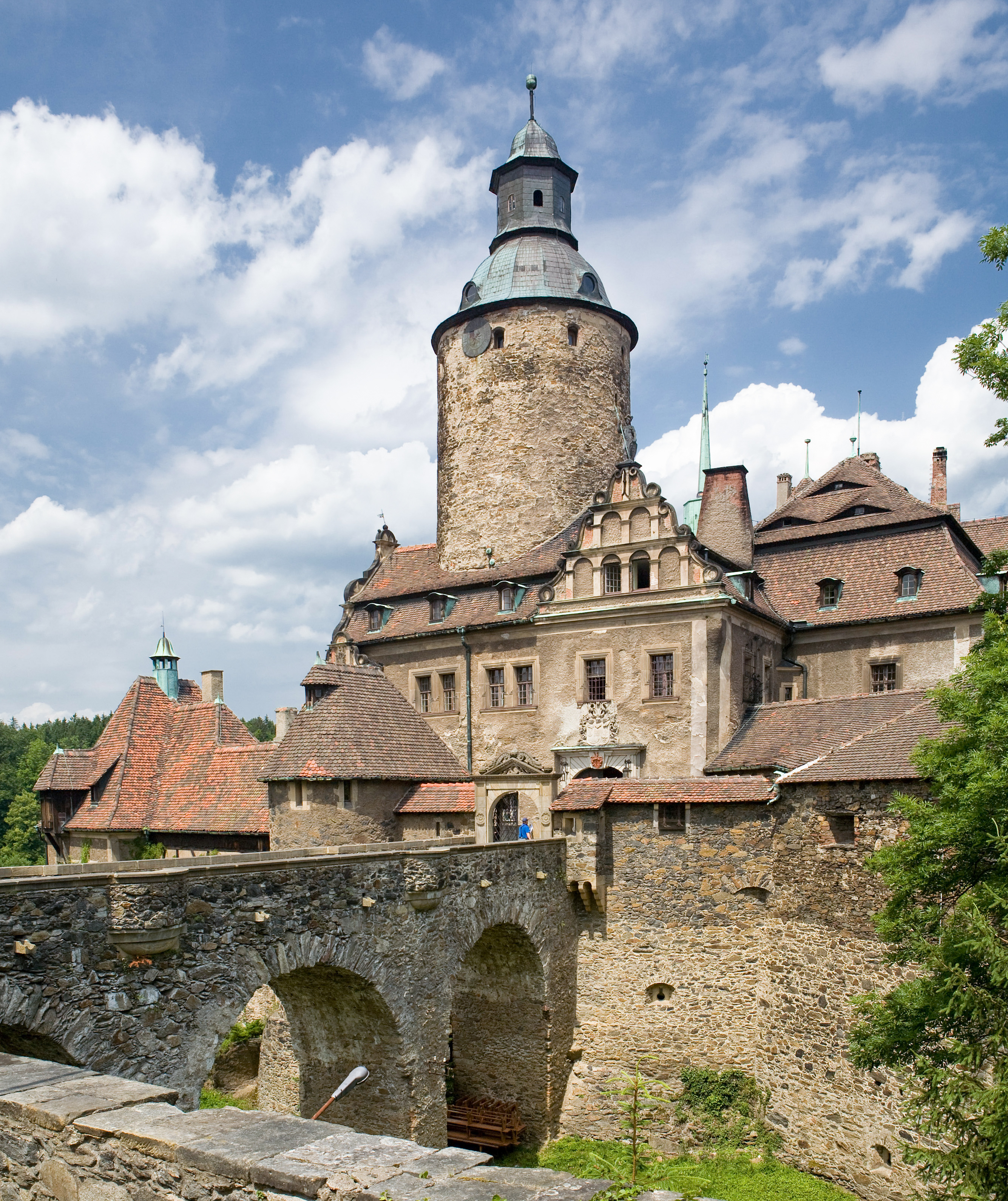
Tzschocha Castle in 2008

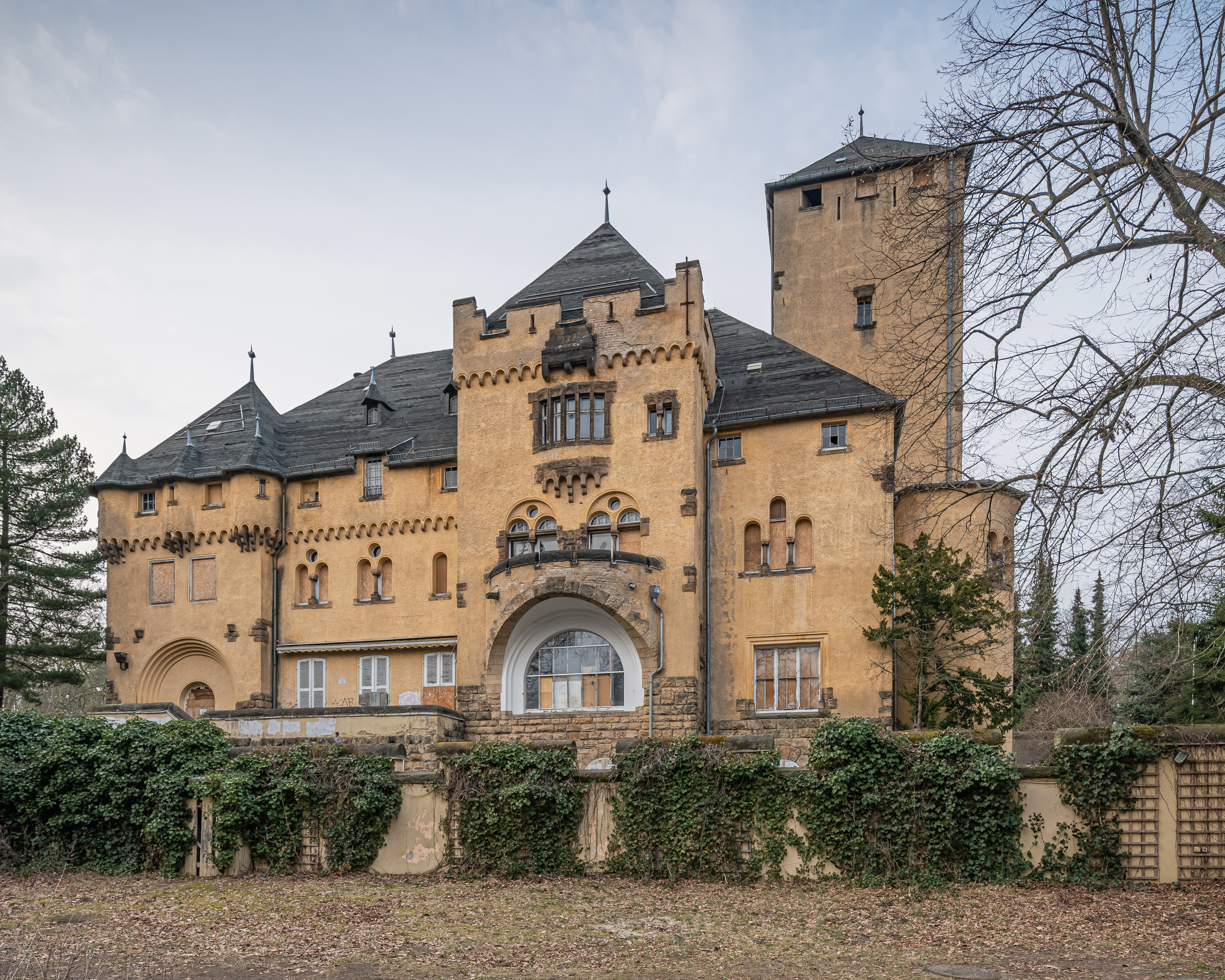
Die Neue Hakeburg, Kleinmachnow (1906–1908)

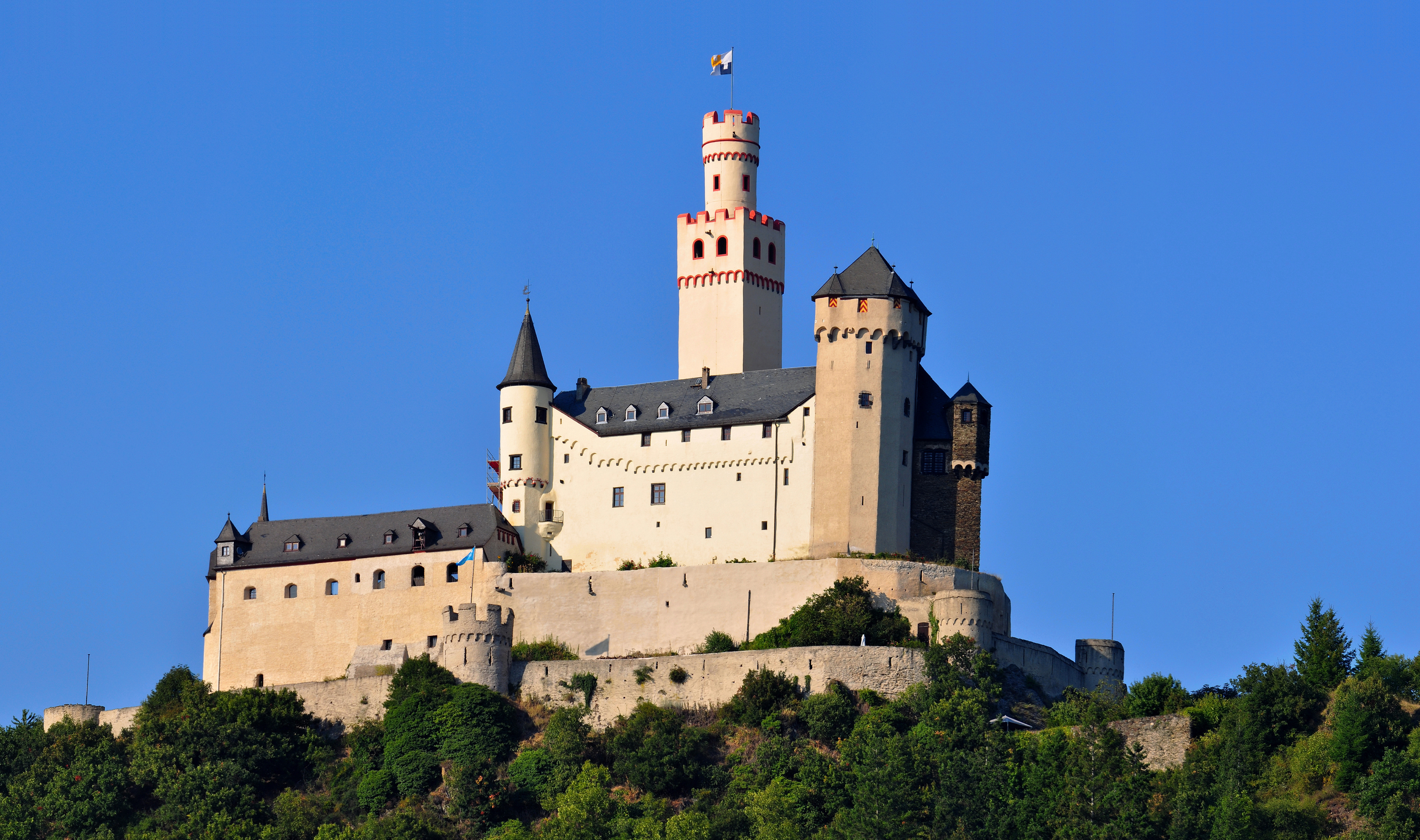
The Marksburg from Braubach

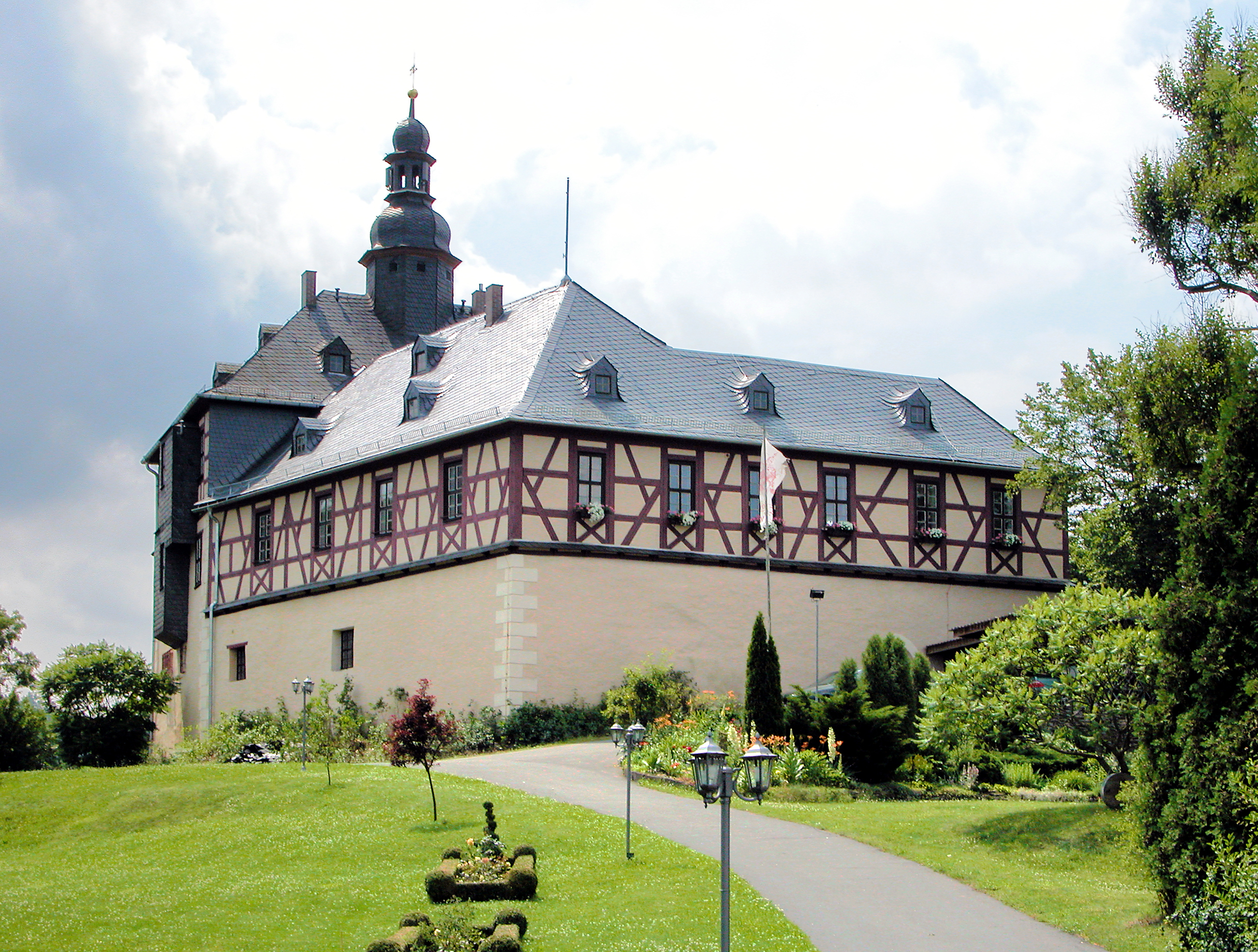
Schloss Eichicht in 2012

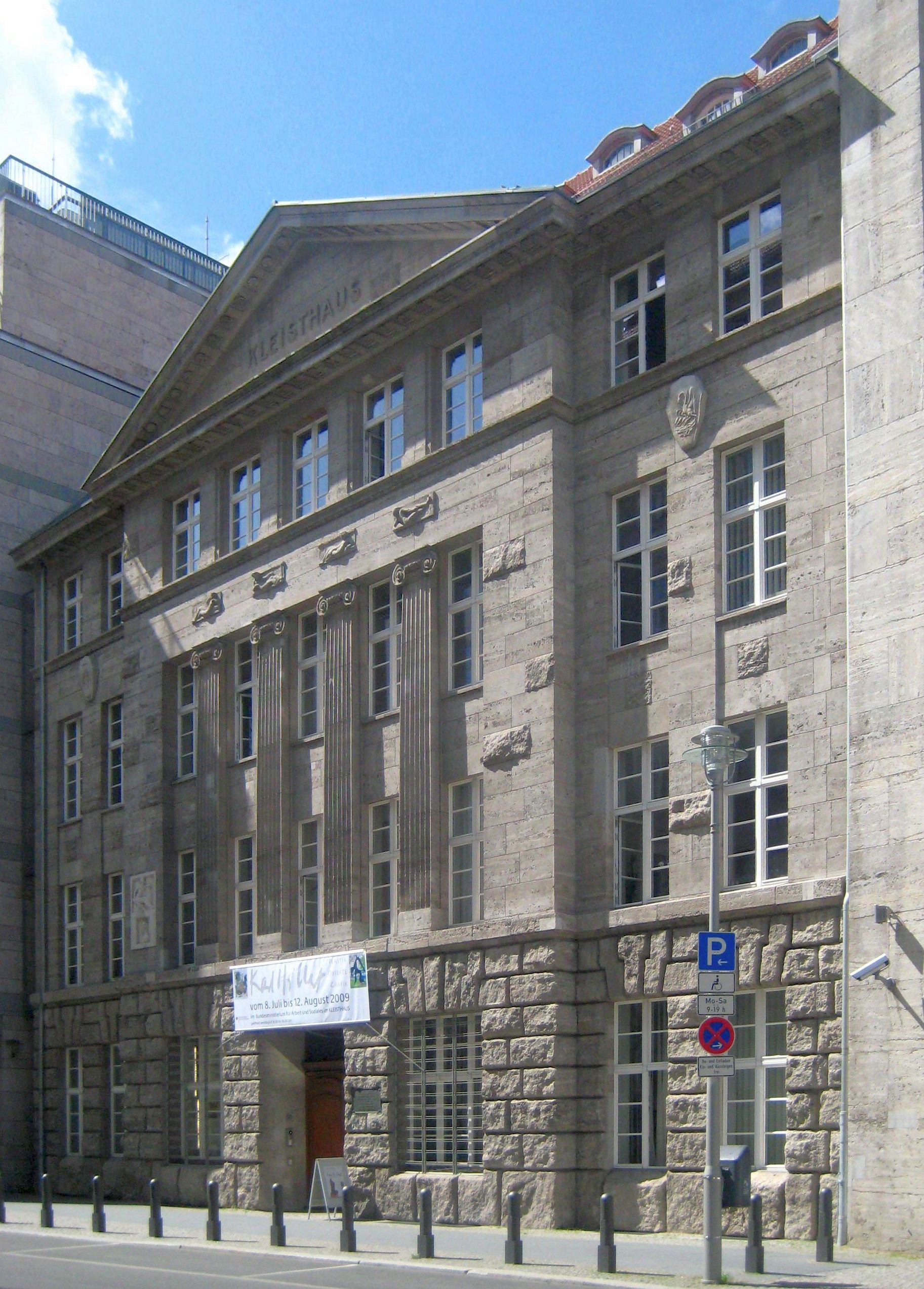
Former Kleisthaus headquarters, Berlin Mitte
