= Orschwiller =

- Commune
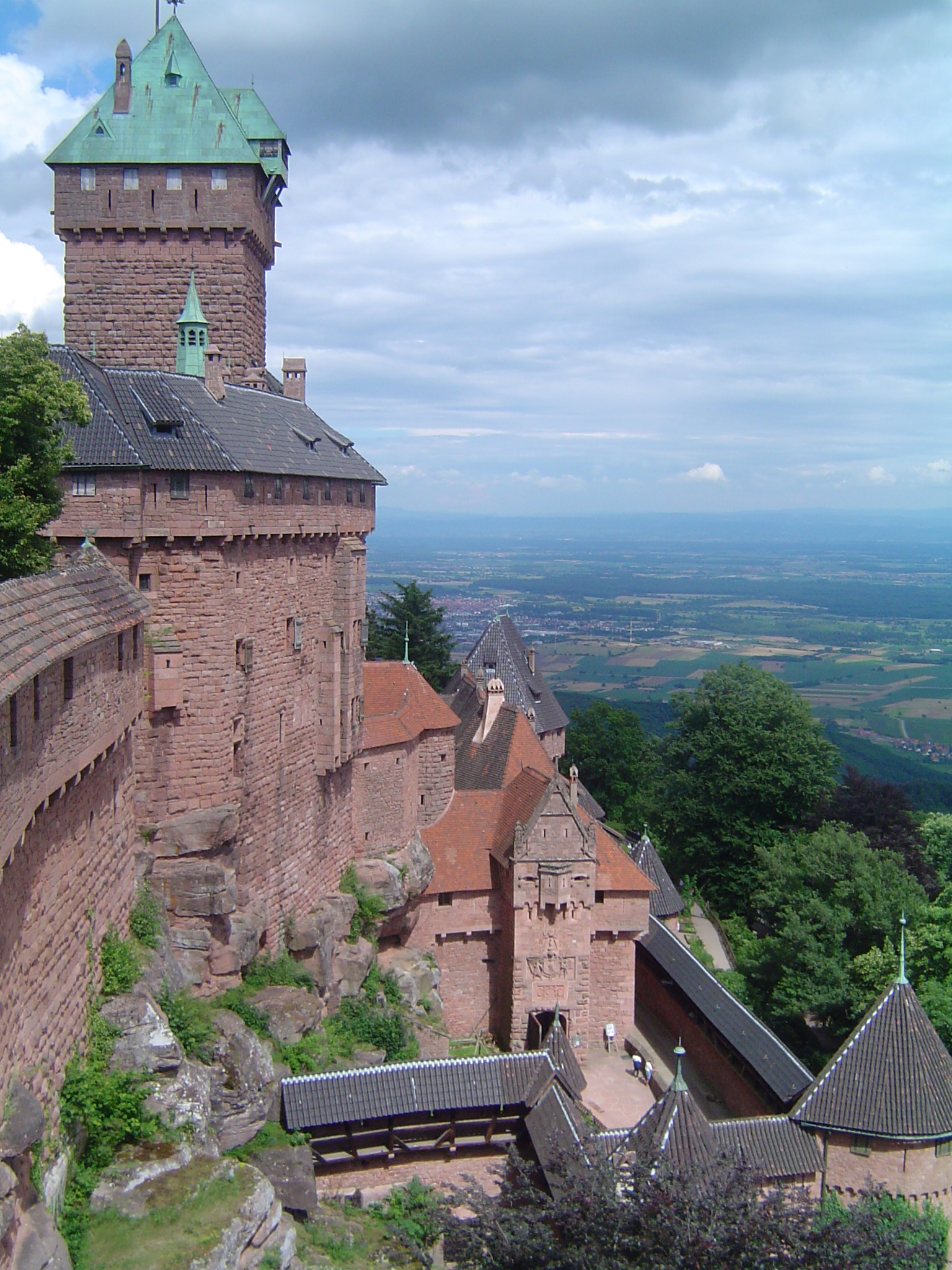
- Château du Haut-Kœnigsbourg

- Coat of arms
- Location of Orschwiller
- Location within France Location within Grand Est
- Coordinates: 48°14′32″N 7°22′59″E
- Country: France
- Region: Grand Est
- Department: Bas-Rhin
- Arrondissement: Sélestat-Erstein
- Canton: Sélestat
- Intercommunality: Sélestat

Government
  - Mayor (2020–2026): Claude Risch
- Area^{1}: 6.32 km^{2} (2.44 sq mi)
- Highest elevation: 714 m (2,343 ft)
- Lowest elevation: 172 m (564 ft)
- Population (2023): 635
  - Density: 100/km^{2} (260/sq mi)
- Time zone: UTC+01:00 (CET)
  - Summer (DST): UTC+02:00 (CEST)
- INSEE/Postal code: 67362 /67600
- ^{1} French Land Register data, which excludes lakes, ponds, glaciers > 1 km^{2} (0.386 sq mi or 247 acres) and river estuaries.

Orschwiller (French pronunciation: [ɔʁʃvilɛʁ]; German: Orschweiler) is a commune in the Bas-Rhin department in Alsace in north-eastern France.

The Château du Haut-Kœnigsbourg is located in the commune.

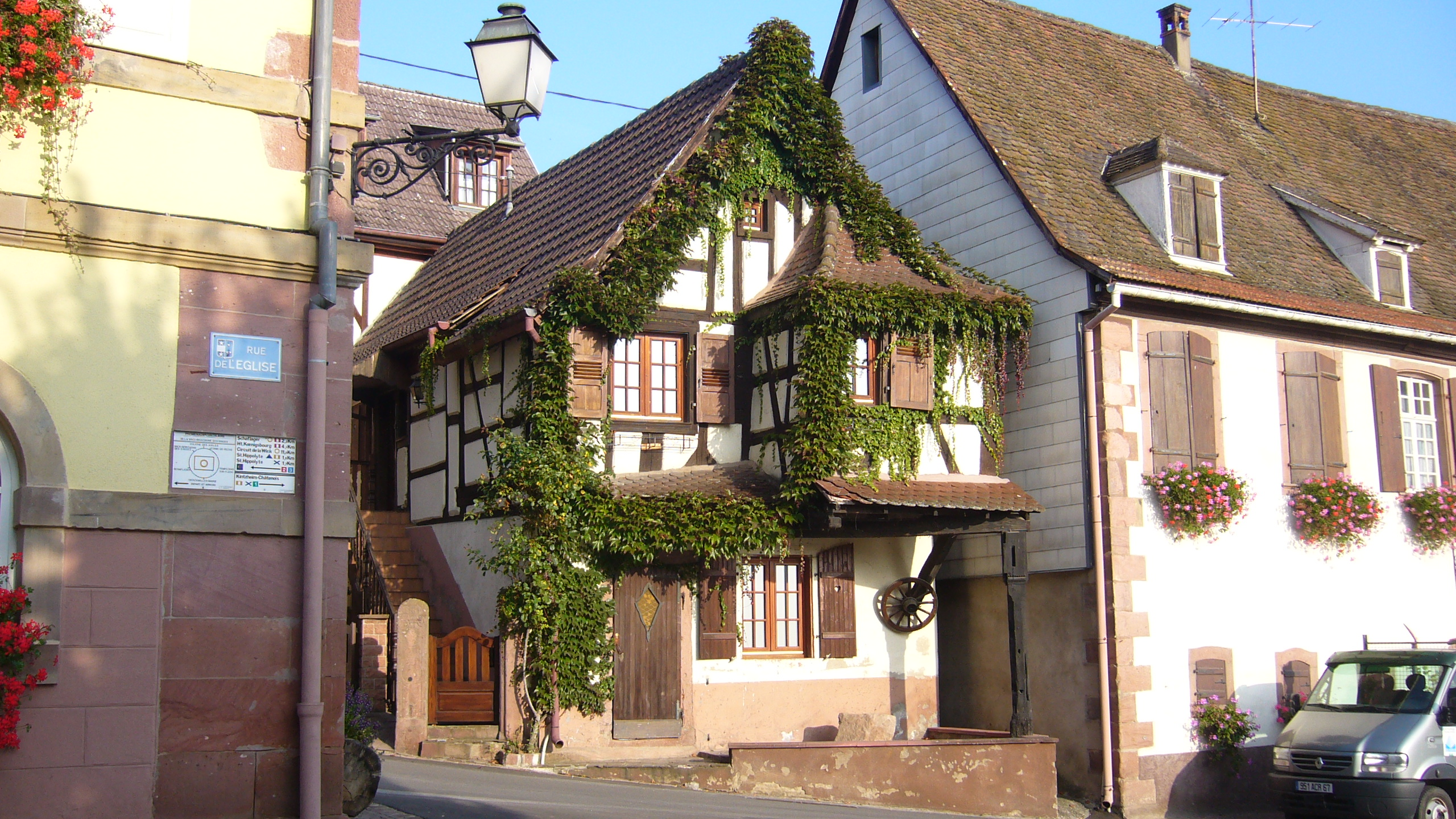
Half-timbered house in Orschwiller

== See also ==
- Communes of the Bas-Rhin department
