= Château du Haut-Koenigsbourg =

Castle in Alsace, France

Coordinates: 48°14′58″N 7°20′39″E

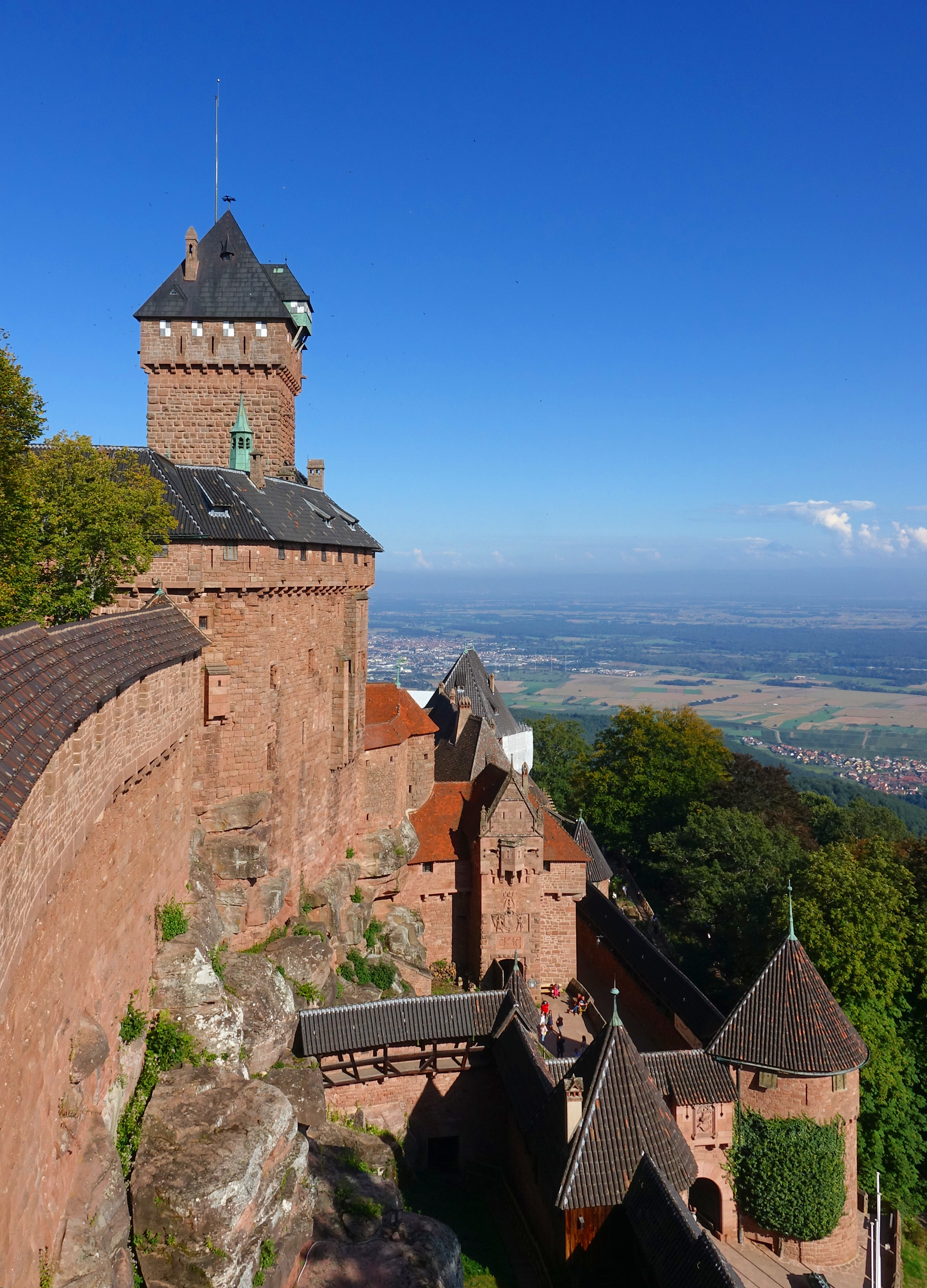
View from the castle over the Alsatian plain up to the Black Forest.

The Château du Haut-Koenigsbourg (French: [ʃɑto dy o kœniksbuʁ]), sometimes also Haut-Kœnigsbourg, is a medieval castle located in the commune of Orschwiller in the Bas-Rhin département of Alsace, France. Located in the Vosges mountains just west of Sélestat, situated in a strategic area on a rocky spur overlooking the Upper Rhine Plain, it was used by successive powers from the Middle Ages until the Thirty Years' War when it was abandoned. From 1900 to 1908 it was rebuilt at the behest of the German kaiser Wilhelm II. Today it is a major tourist site, attracting more than 500,000 visitors a year.

== History ==
The Buntsandstein cliff was first mentioned as Stofenberk (Staufenberg) in a 774 deed issued by the Frankish king Charlemagne. Again certified in 854, it was then a possession of the French Basilica of St Denis and the site of a monastery.

=== Middle Ages ===
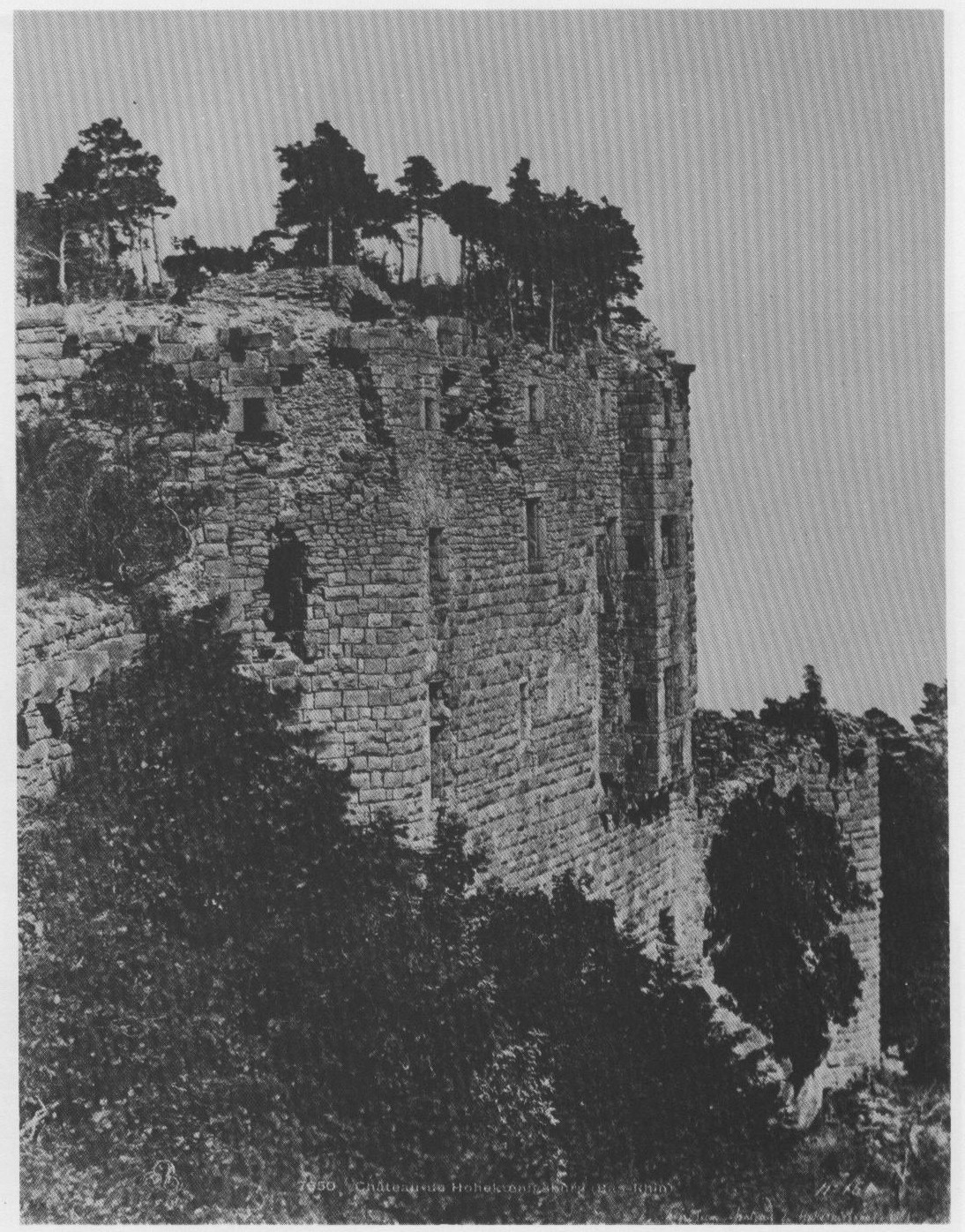
Castle ruins, 1851

It is not known when the first castle was built. However, a Burg Staufen (Castrum Estufin) is documented in 1147, when the monks complained to King Louis VII of France about its unlawful construction by the Hohenstaufen Duke Frederick II of Swabia. Frederick's younger brother Conrad III had been elected King of the Romans in 1138, to be succeeded by Frederick's son Frederick Barbarossa in 1152 and, by 1192, the castle was called Kinzburg (Königsburg, "King's Castle").

In the early 13th century, the fortification passed from the Hohenstaufen family to the dukes of Lorraine, who entrusted it to the local Rathsamhausen knightly family and the Lords of Hohenstein, who held the castle until the 15th century. As the Hohensteins allowed some robber barons to use the castle as a hideout, and their behaviour began to exasperate the neighbouring rulers, in 1454 it was occupied by Elector Palatine Frederick I and in 1462 was set ablaze by the unified forces of the cities of Colmar, Strasbourg and Basel.

In 1479, the Habsburg emperor Frederick III granted the castle ruins in fief to the Counts of Thierstein, who rebuilt them with a defensive system suited to the new artillery of the time. When in 1517 the last Thierstein died, the castle became a reverted fief and again came into the possession of the Habsburg emperor of the day, Maximilian I. In 1633, during the Thirty Years' War in which Catholic forces fought Protestant armies, the Imperial castle was besieged by Protestant Swedish forces. After a 52-day siege, the castle was burned and looted by the Swedish troops. For several hundred years it was left unused and the ruins became overgrown by the forest. Various romantic poets and artists were inspired by the castle during this time.

=== 19th century renovation ===
The ruins were listed as a monument historique of the Second French Empire in 1862 and were purchased by the township of Sélestat (or Schlettstadt) three years later. After the Franco-Prussian War of 1870 to 1871, the region was incorporated into the German Imperial Territory of Alsace-Lorraine and, in 1899, the citizens granted what was left of the castle to the German emperor Wilhelm II. Wilhelm wished to create a castle lauding the qualities of Alsace in the Middle Ages and more generally of German civilization stretching from Hohkönigsburg in the west to (likewise restored) Marienburg Castle in the east. He also hoped the restoration would reinforce the bond of Alsatians with Germany, as they had only recently been incorporated into the newly established German Empire. The management of the restoration of the fortifications was entrusted to the architect Bodo Ebhardt, a proven expert on the reconstruction of medieval castles. Work proceeded from 1900 to 1908. On May 13, 1908, the restored Hohkönigsburg was inaugurated in the presence of the Emperor. In an elaborate re-enactment ceremony, a historic cortege entered the castle, under a torrential downpour.

Ebhardt's aim was to rebuild it, as near as possible, as it was on the eve of the Thirty Years' War. He relied heavily on historical accounts but, occasionally lacking information, he had to improvise some parts of the stronghold. For example, the Keep tower is now reckoned to be about 14 metres too tall. Wilhelm II, who regularly visited the construction site via a specially built train station in nearby Saint-Hippolyte, also encouraged certain modifications that emphasised a Romantic nostalgia for Germanic civilization. For example, the main dining hall has a higher roof than it did at the time and links between the Hohenzollern family and the Habsburg rulers of the Holy Roman Empire are emphasized. The Emperor wanted to legitimise the House of Hohenzollern at the head of the Second Empire and to assure himself as worthy heir of the Hohenstaufens and the Habsburgs.

== Description ==
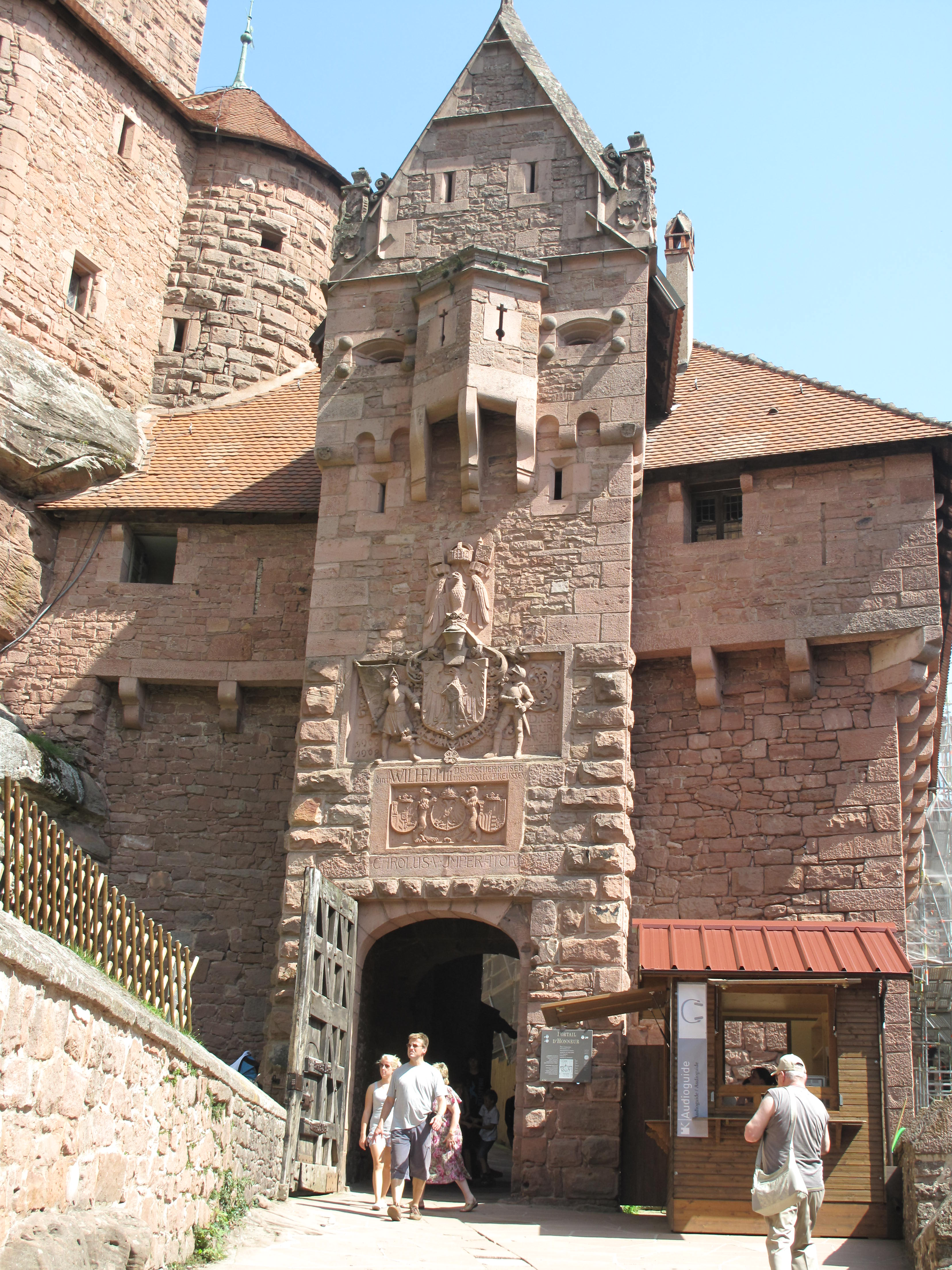
Main gate with arms of Wilhelm II and emperor Charles V

After World War I, the French state confiscated the castle in accordance with the 1919 Treaty of Versailles.

It has been listed since 1862 and classified since 1993 as a monument historique by the French Ministry of Culture. In 2007, ownership was transferred to the Bas-Rhin département. Today, it is one of the most famous tourist attractions in the region.

For many years it was considered fashionable in France to sneer at the castle because of its links to the German emperor. Many considered it to be nothing more than a fairy tale castle similar to Neuschwanstein. However, in recent years many historians have established that, although it is not a completely accurate reconstruction, it is at least interesting for what it shows about Wilhelm II's romantic nationalist ideas of the past and the architect's work. Indeed, Bodo Ebhardt restored the castle following a close study of the remaining walls, archives and other fortified castles built at the same period.

Parts of the 1937 film La Grande Illusion by Jean Renoir were shot at Haut-Koenigsbourg.

Located just below Château du Haut-Koenigsbourg is the ruin of Château de l'Oedenbourg, which is also known as Petit-Koenigsbourg and is a historical monument in its own right. Construction of Château de l'Oedenbourg is believed to have begun during the 13th century.

== Copy in Malaysia ==
A copy of the castle has been built in the Berjaya Hills, 60 kilometres (37 mi) north-east of Kuala Lumpur. A copy of the historic Alsatian city of Colmar is located next to it.

== See also ==
- List of castles in France

== Sources ==
- Monique Fuchs and Bernhard Metz, The Castle of Haut Koenigsbourg, éd du Patrimoine, Paris, 2001.
