= List of the oldest buildings in Illinois =

This article lists the oldest extant buildings in Illinois, including extant buildings and structures constructed prior to and during the United States rule over Illinois. Only buildings built prior to 1830 are suitable for inclusion on this list, or the building must be the oldest of its type.

In order to qualify for the list, a structure must:

- be a recognizable building (defined as any human-made structure used or intended for supporting or sheltering any use or continuous occupancy);
- incorporate features of building work from the claimed date to at least 1.5 metres (4.9 ft) in height and/or be a listed building.

This consciously excludes ruins of limited height, roads and statues. Bridges may be included if they otherwise fulfill the above criteria. Dates for many of the oldest structures have been arrived at by radiocarbon dating or dendrochronology and should be considered approximate. If the exact year of initial construction is estimated, it will be shown as a range of dates.

== List of oldest buildings ==
Building	Image	Location	First built	Use	Notes
Old Cahokia Courthouse		Cahokia Heights, Illinois	1737	Residence/Courthouse	Oldest building in Illinois. French Canadian Court House
Fort de Chartres Powder Magazine		Randolph County, Illinois	c. 1750	Military	Oldest stone building in Illinois; French military fortification
Church of the Holy Family		Cahokia Heights, Illinois	1786-1799	Church	French Canadian church
Martin–Boismenue House		East Carondelet	1790	Residential	One of the oldest surviving French Colonial structures in Illinois.
Creole House		Prairie du Rocher, Illinois	c. 1800	Residence	One of the oldest surviving French colonial homes in Prairie du Rocher.
Pierre Menard Home		near Kaskaskia, Illinois	c. 1802	Residence	Oldest former home of a former state government official (Pierre Menard) standing in the state
Kirkpatrick House		Edwardsville, Illinois	1805	Residence	Oldest house in Edwardsville and Madison County which was built by the founder of Edwardsville Thomas Kirkpatrick
Nicholas Jarrot Mansion		Cahokia Heights, Illinois	1807–1810	Residence	French trapper's Federal style house
James Lemen House		New Design, Illinois	c. 1810	Residence	Oldest brick house in Monroe County and only surviving building from the New Design settlement
Rose Hotel		Elizabethtown, Illinois	1812	Hotel	Oldest hotel in the state
Robinson-Stewart House		Carmi, Illinois	1814	Residence	Oldest building in Carmi
Daniel Tolman House		Edwardsville, Illinois	1819	Residence	Second oldest building in Edwardsville
Benjamin Stephenson House		Edwardsville, Illinois	1820	Residence	Home of territorial Illinois delegate Benjamin Stephenson
Black Homestead Farm		Greene County, Illinois	1821	Residence	Oldest standing house in Greene County
John Shaw Cabin		Hamburg, Illinois	c. 1822	Residence	Oldest standing building in Calhoun County
Clayville Tavern		Clayville, Illinois	1824	Tavern	Tavern built by John Broadwell
Dowling House		Galena, Illinois	1826-27	Residence	Oldest building in Galena
Ratcliff Inn		Carmi, Illinois	1828	Residence	Built for Carmi founder James Ratcliff
Hodges House		Carrollton, Illinois	1829	Residence	Oldest house in Carrollton
John Patton Log Cabin		Lexington, Illinois	1829	Residence	One of the oldest buildings in McLean County, Illinois
Beecher Hall		Jacksonville, Illinois	1829-1830	College Building	Oldest college building in Illinois and the first built in the state
Mermaid House Hotel		Lebanon, Illinois	1830	Hotel	Built by Lyman Adams. Visited by Charles Dickens in 1842.
Noble–Seymour–Crippen House		Chicago, Illinois	1833	Residence	The oldest building in Chicago
John B. Harper House		Palestine, Illinois	c. 1833	Residence	The oldest building in Crawford County
Vandalia State House		Vandalia, Illinois	1836	Capitol Building	Oldest state capitol building in Illinois
Henry B. Clarke House		Chicago, Illinois	1836	Residence	
Caspar Ott Cabin		Deerfield, Illinois	1837	Residence	Oldest building in Lake County
John C. Flanagan House Museum		Peoria, Illinois	1837	Residence	Oldest building in Peoria, Illinois
Mother Rudd House and Inn		Gurnee, Illinois	1841-1843	Residence	Oldest building in Warren Township
Thebes Courthouse		Thebes, Illinois	1848	Courthouse	Oldest building in Alexander County
Wingert House		Chicago	1854	Residence	
Old St. Patrick's Church		Chicago	1854	Church	Oldest surviving church in Chicago
Iglehart House		Chicago	1857	Residence	
Elias Cosper Home		Rockford	1867	Residence	
University Hall		Evanston	1869	College building	Oldest building on the campus of Northwestern University
Chicago Water Tower		Chicago	1869	Utility	
Chicago Avenue Pumping Station		Chicago	1869	Utility	
Delaware Building		Chicago	1872	Commercial	
Berghoff Buildings		Chicago	1872	Commercial	Three buildings currently occupied by the Berghoff restaurant
Page Brothers Building		Chicago	1872	Commercial	The building features Chicago's last remaining cast iron façade
Haskell-Barker-Atwater Buildings		Chicago	1875-1877	Commercial	
Harker Hall		Urbana	1877	College building	Oldest building in use on the campus of the University of Illinois
Manhattan Building		Chicago	1889–1891	Commercial	Oldest surviving skyscraper in the world. Currently residential condominiums.

== See also ==
- National Register of Historic Places listings in Illinois
- History of Illinois
- Oldest buildings in the United States
