= Cartwright Township, Sangamon County, Illinois =

Cartwright Township
- Township
- Location in Sangamon County

- Sangamon County's location in Illinois
- Coordinates: 39°50′20″N 89°54′33″W
- Country: United States
- State: Illinois
- County: Sangamon
- Established: November 6, 1860

Government
  - Supervisor: Dan Kern
  - Highway Commissioner: Dan McCafferty

Area
  - Total: 72.04 sq mi (186.6 km^{2})
  - Land: 72 sq mi (190 km^{2})
  - Water: 0.04 sq mi (0.10 km^{2}) 0.06%

Population (2010)
  - Estimate (2016): 1,470
  - Density: 20.6/sq mi (8.0/km^{2})
- Time zone: UTC-6 (CST)
  - Summer (DST): UTC-5 (CDT)
- FIPS code: 17-167-11579

Cartwright Township is located in Sangamon County, Illinois. As of the 2010 census, its population was 1,482 and it contained 615 housing units. The township is named after pioneer missionary and Methodist minister Peter Cartwright, who lived in the township and is buried there. A United Methodist congregation within the limits of Pleasant Plains also bears his name. The most populated area of Cartwright Township is the town of Pleasant Plains, Illinois. Pleasant Plains has approximately 800 residents within its boundaries. The rest of the township is dotted with farmsteads and crop fields. Cartwright Township is known for its rich, fertile land and its agricultural roots. It is also the original home of Brandt Professional Agriculture now located in Springfield, IL. Brandts is a worldwide corporation that was a pioneer in agricultural fertilizer and is still the leader today.

As well as Pleasant Plains, Cartwright Township is also the home of Clayville, Illinois, an Illinois frontier ghost town (1824). The former settlement's brick tavern has been preserved by the township historical society.

== Geography ==
According to the 2010 census, the township has a total area of 72.04 square miles (186.6 km^{2}), of which 72 square miles (190 km^{2}) (or 99.94%) is land and 0.04 square miles (0.10 km^{2}) (or 0.06%) is water.

== Demographics ==
Historical population
Census	Pop.	Note	%±
2016 (est.)	1,470
U.S. Decennial Census
