= James F. Short Jr. =

American sociologist (1924–2018)

James Franklin Short Jr.
- Born: June 22, 1924; Sangamon County, Illinois, U.S.
- Died: May 13, 2018 (aged 93)
- Education: University of Chicago
- Scientific career
- Fields: Sociology
- Workplaces: Washington State University

James Franklin Short Jr. (June 22, 1924 – May 13, 2018) was an American sociologist.

== Biography ==
Born on June 22, 1924, James Franklin Short Jr. was raised on a farm near Pleasant Plains, Illinois. His father was a teacher. Short Jr. served in the United States Marine Corps before completing his doctorate in sociology at the University of Chicago, where he became known for his work with Fred Strodtbeck. He joined the faculty of Washington State University upon graduation in 1951, and retired in 1997. He was editor of the American Sociological Review from 1972 to 1975, awarded a Guggenheim Fellowship in 1975, and served as president of the American Sociological Association in 1984. Short died at the age of 93 on May 13, 2018.
