= Baldenheim =

Baldenheim Bàldene
- Commune
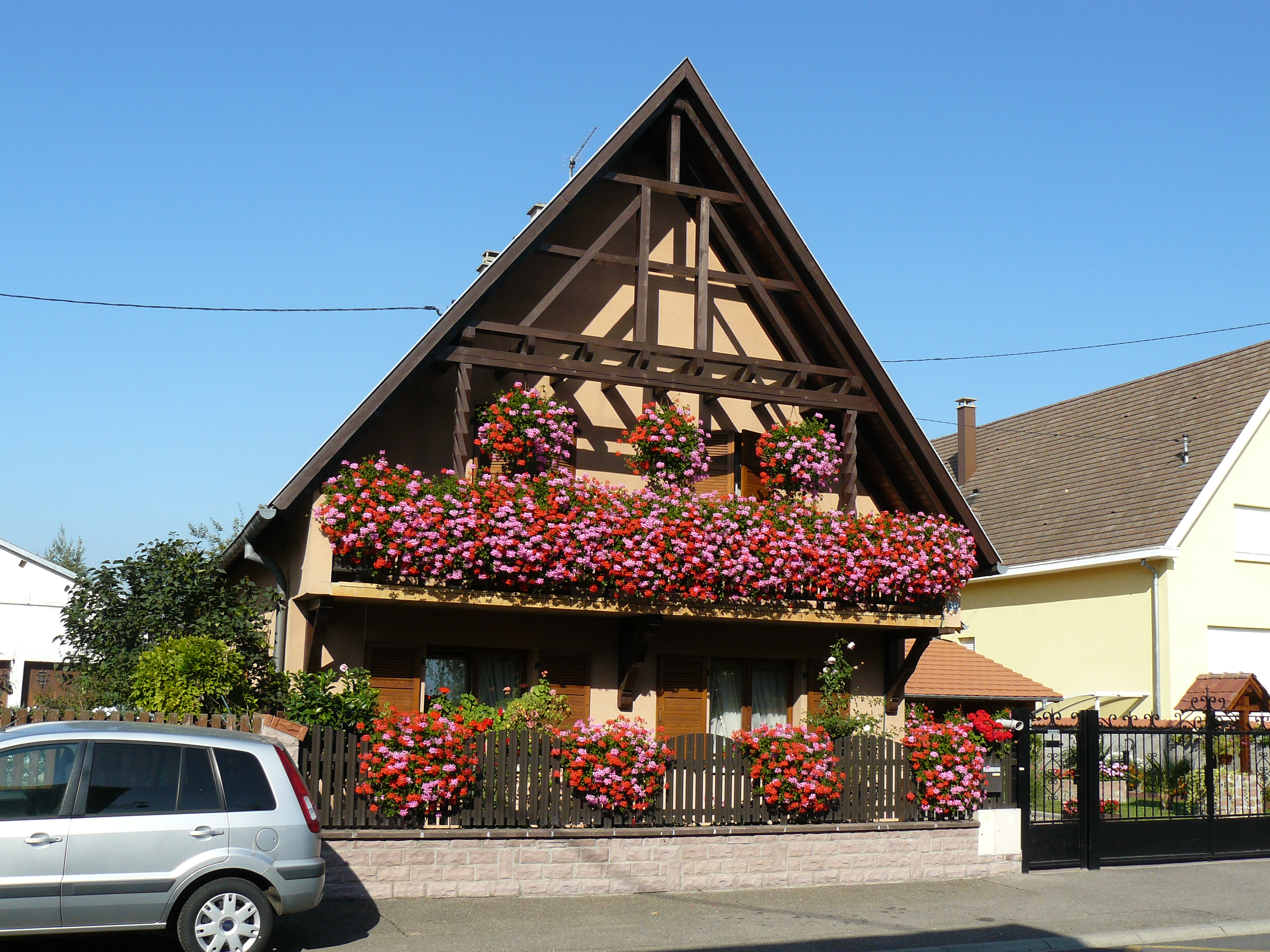
- A house in Baldenheim

- Coat of arms
- Location of Baldenheim
- Location within France Location within Grand Est
- Coordinates: 48°14′19″N 7°32′21″E
- Country: France
- Region: Grand Est
- Department: Bas-Rhin
- Arrondissement: Sélestat-Erstein
- Canton: Sélestat
- Intercommunality: Sélestat

Government
  - Mayor (2020–2026): Virginie Muhr
- Area^{1}: 9.44 km^{2} (3.64 sq mi)
- Highest elevation: 172 m (564 ft)
- Lowest elevation: 165 m (541 ft)
- Population (2023): 1,254
  - Density: 133/km^{2} (344/sq mi)
- Time zone: UTC+01:00 (CET)
  - Summer (DST): UTC+02:00 (CEST)
- INSEE/Postal code: 67019 /67600
- ^{1} French Land Register data, which excludes lakes, ponds, glaciers > 1 km^{2} (0.386 sq mi or 247 acres) and river estuaries.

Baldenheim (French pronunciation: [baldənaim]) is a commune in the Bas-Rhin department in the Alsace region of north-eastern France.

The commune has been awarded two flowers by the Conseil National des Villes et Villages Fleuris (National Council of Towns and Villages in Bloom) in the cities and villages in bloom competition.

== Geography ==
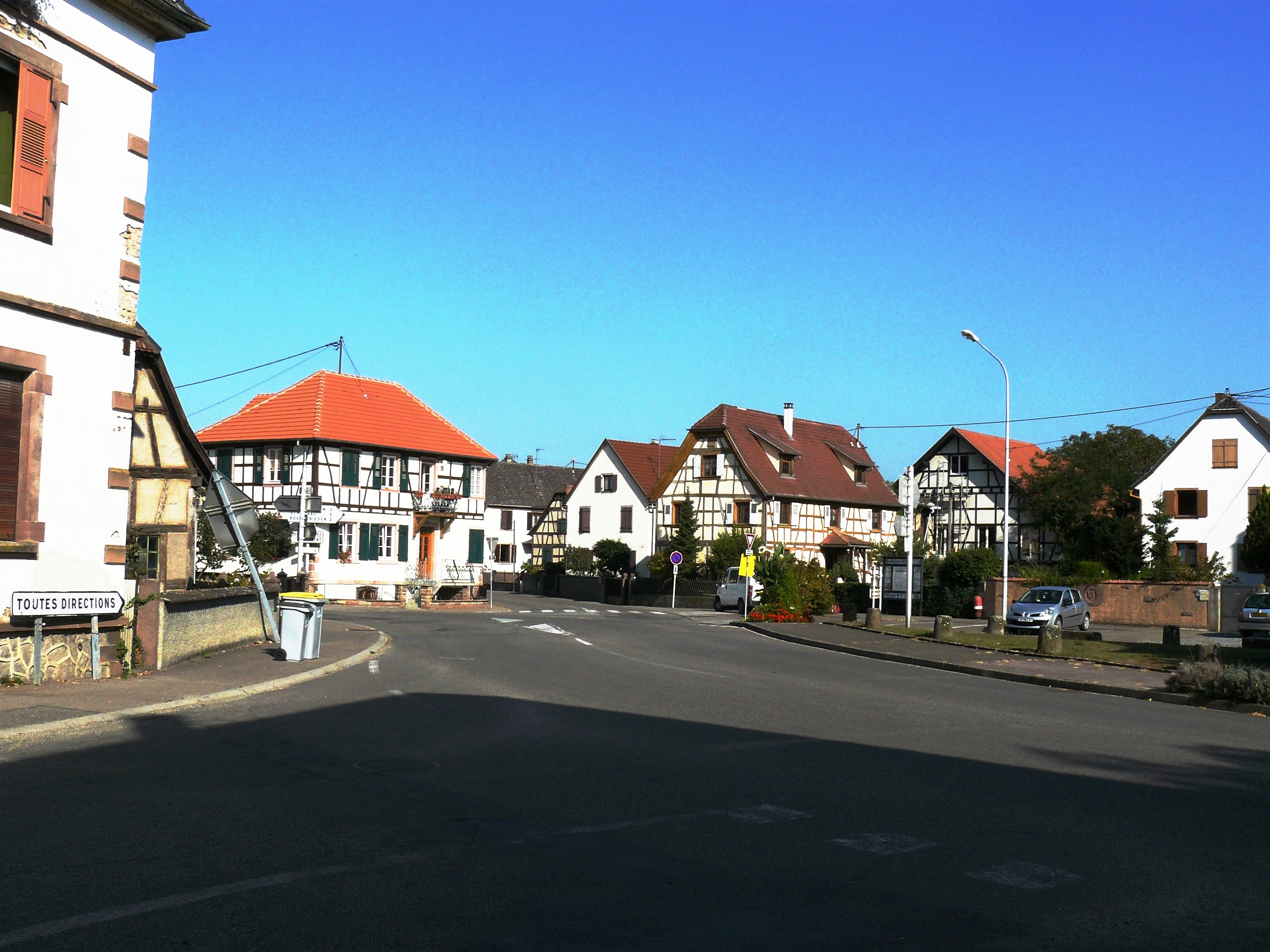
Middle of the village and its half-timbered houses.

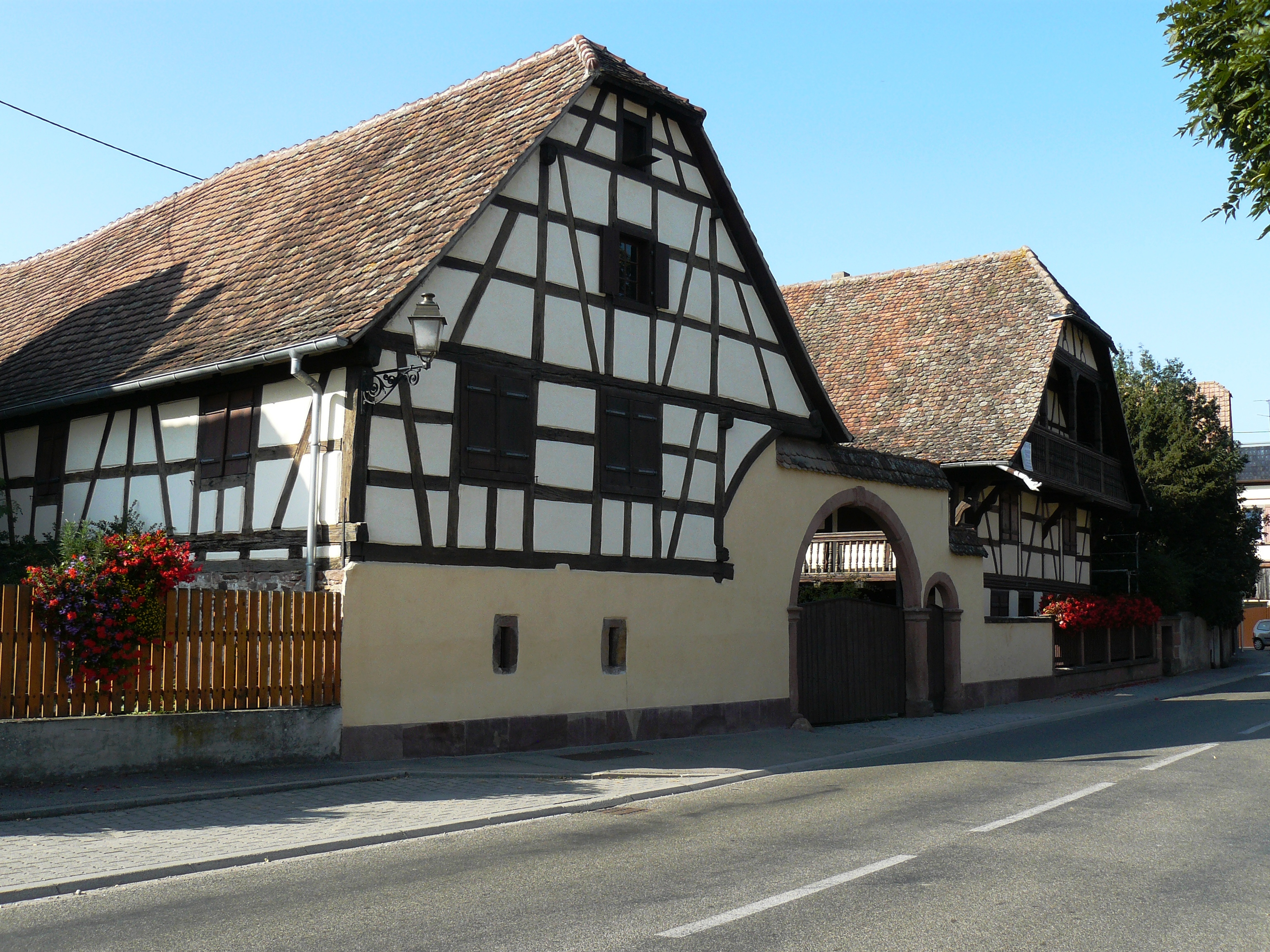
An old half-timbered farmhouse from the 18th century

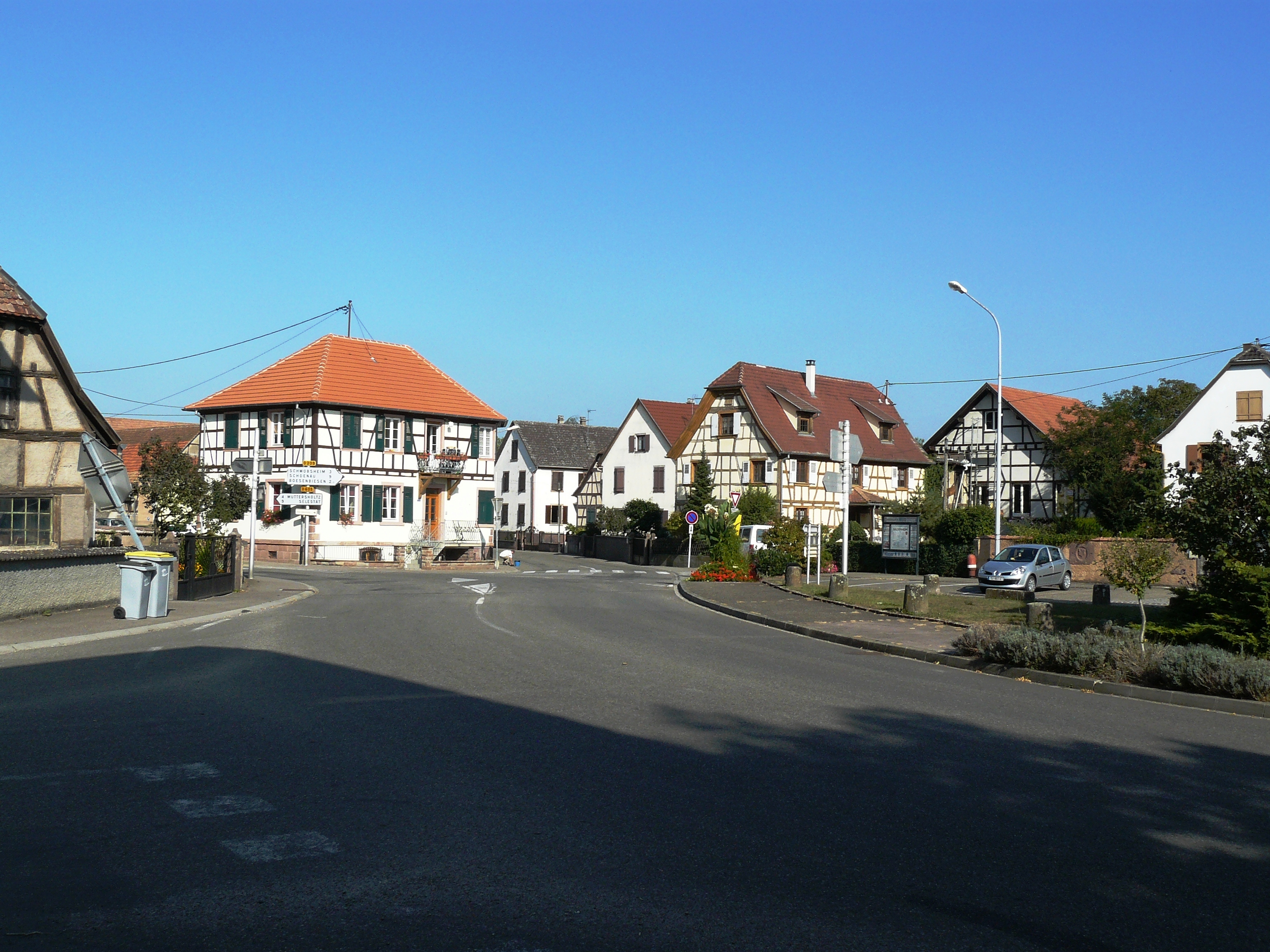
The village and some half-timbered houses

Baldenheim is located in the canton of Sélestat and the arrondissement of Sélestat-Erstein in the centre of the Alsace region on the alluvial plain of the Rhine, 45 kilometres (28 mi) south of Strasbourg, 26 kilometres (16 mi) north by north-east of Colmar and 8 kilometres (5.0 mi) east of Sélestat. Access to the commune is by the D605 from Hessenheim in the south which passes through the village and continues north to Muttersholtz. The D209 comes from Schwobsheim in the east and passes through the village continuing west to join the D21 near the commune border. The D208 goes south-west from the village to Mussig.

=== Natural environment ===
The commune is at the centre of a flat alluvial plain and is part of the Ried Natural Region. The water table is only 1.5 metres (4 ft 11 in) below the surface on average. Water pierces the clay layer and gives rise to waterways. The Ill river flows relatively calmly across the plain. Like all the rivers in Vosges it is subject to an oceanic regime which is characterized by high winter waters and low summer waters, contrary to the Rhine. The last catastrophic flood occurred in May 1983. The climate is of semi-continental type with about 600 millimetres (24 in) of rain per year. Temperature differences are particularly marked: summers can be very hot and the winters harsh.

=== Landscape ===
The commune outside the urban area has five distinct types of landscape:

- Suburban village: orchards and gardens
- Rural open spaces: fields and woods
- Wetland: the Black Ried
- Banks of the Ill: the Grey Ried
- Forested areas.

About 80% of the utilized agricultural area is cultivated.

The Ill, the Blind and numerous streams flow north through the commune, all eventually merging with the Ill which joins the Rhine at Plobsheim.

== Toponymy ==
Bandenheim, 1182

== History ==
There is a Merovingian and Carolingian Cemetery with a hundred graves which attest to the ancient occupation of the commune. Most of the tombs are shallow between 0.50–0.60 metres (1 ft 8 in – 2 ft 0 in) below the topsoil) and contained no ornaments with disturbed skeletons indicating plundering long ago. Another group of burials are deeper (between 1.20–1.50 metres (3 ft 11 in – 4 ft 11 in) and contained relatively rich ornaments (brooches in bronze and silver partitioned with garnet, glass beads, glass paste necklaces, amber necklaces and other objects from the second half of the 6th century and the second third of the 7th century. The ornaments collected from Baldenheim are from a time period between 550 and 650.

Baldenheim appeared in a document from the second half of the 7th century in the form of Baldenheim Villa. The name of this village, according to legend, is that the Devil one day lost his hat. He refused to retrieve it saying, "B'haltene" (keep it). The village did not have a name at that time and adopted this onomatopoeia. But the name Baldenheim does appear in the 9th century.

The Protestant Reformation was introduced in 1576. A castle was built in 1740 and destroyed in 1821. The Simultaneau in 1843 provoked a violent conflict between the two religious communities (Protestant and Catholic). In the 19th century there was significant growth in weaving and there were 150 weavers in the commune. In the last third of the 19th century, the co-operative movement developed in the commune. A savings bank was founded in 1890 and a dairy co-operative operated until 1981.

In 1324, the village belonged to the Duchy of Württemberg. It had then been given in fief to the Rathsamhausen zum Stein family. Upon the extinction of this noble family, Louis XIV gave it to the engineer of Chamlay, leaving it for him to pay tribute to the Duke of Württemberg who, on the death of the commander of Chamlay, passed the fief to the family of Sandersleben-Coligny. Before the French Revolution it was owned by the Waldner Freundstein family whose castle was demolished in 1820. From the 19th century, home weaving occupied a very important place in the local economy.

Baldenheim is known for its festival of "Pfingstpflitteri" which was held for the tenth time in 1999.

=== The Merovingian helmet ===
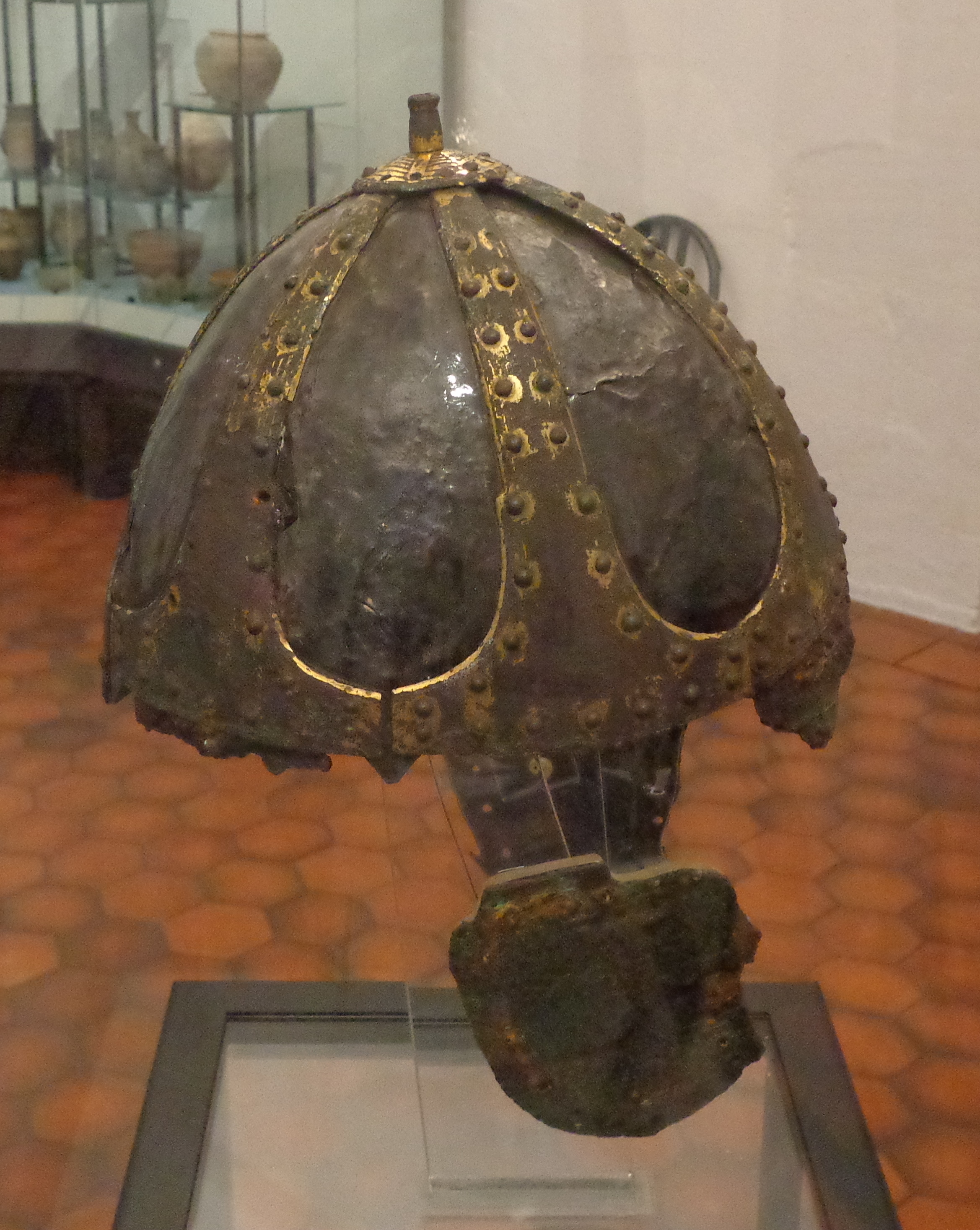
The Baldenheim Helmet in the Strasbourg Archaeological Museum

In July 1902, Oscar Pfiffer discovered some objects in his field at Lange Gasse. A more thorough search uncovered a ceremonial helmet and other Merovingian objects. A study published in 1907 by R. Henning made Baldenheim the eponymous site for this type of helmet with 30 examples identified at this time.

The Baldenheim Helmet is now on display at the Museum of Archaeology in Strasbourg.

=== Heraldry ===
Arms of Baldenheim	Blazon: Gules, a coutre knife Argent in pale point to base, blade to dexter.

== Administration ==
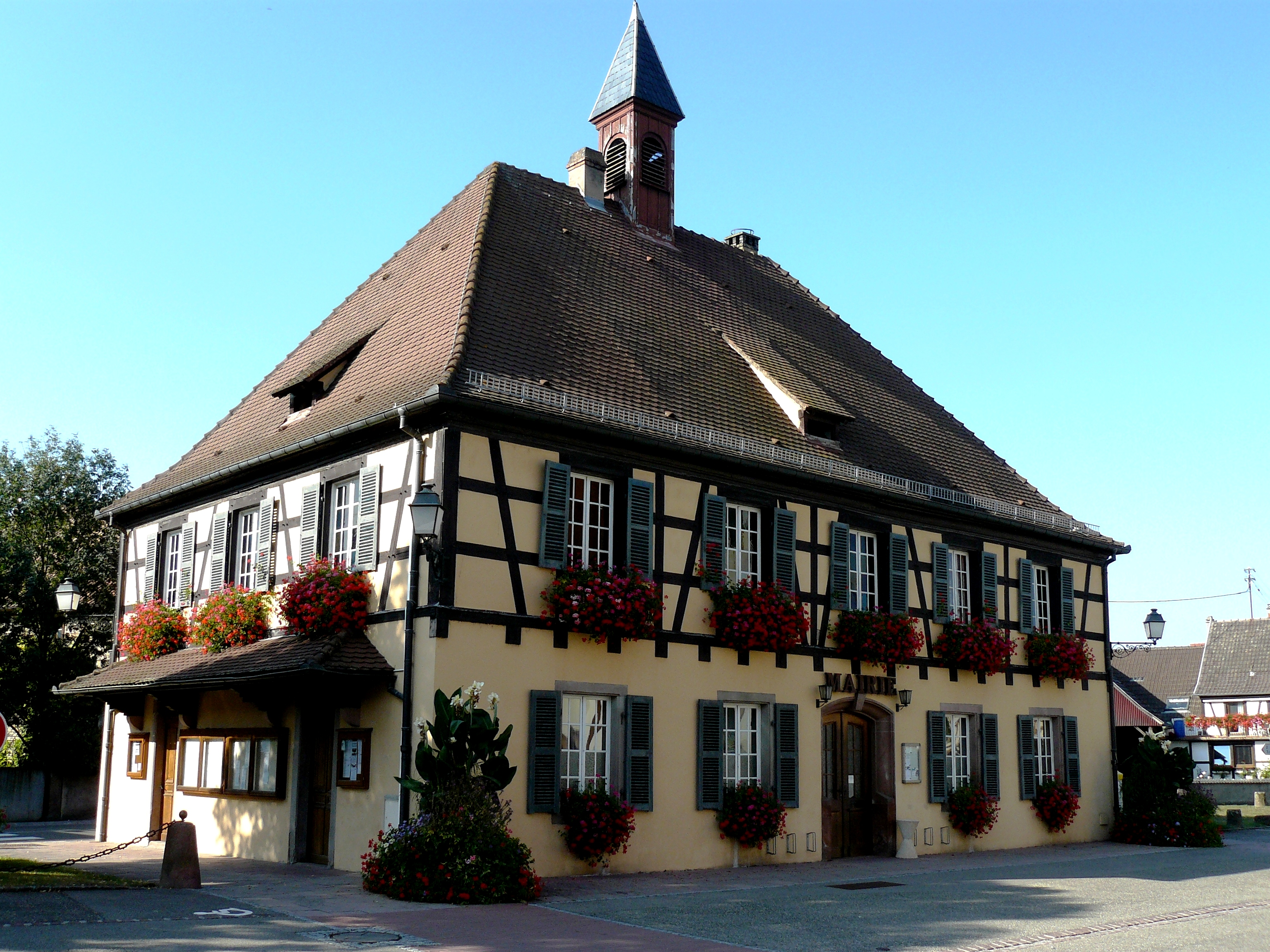
The Town Hall from the 17th century

List of Successive Mayors

From	To	Name
2001	2020	Willy Schwander
2020	2026	Virginie Muhr

== Demography ==
The inhabitants of the commune are known as Baldenheimois or Baldenheimoises in French.

Historical population

Year	Pop.	±% p.a.
1793	826	—
1800	758	−1.22%
1806	872	+2.36%
1821	1,019	+1.04%
1831	1,004	−0.15%
1836	1,040	+0.71%
1841	1,071	+0.59%
1846	1,079	+0.15%
1851	1,040	−0.73%
1856	1,032	−0.15%
1861	1,045	+0.25%
1866	1,083	+0.72%
1871	1,074	−0.17%
1875	1,042	−0.75%
1880	1,062	+0.38%
1885	1,049	−0.25%
1890	1,075	+0.49%
1895	1,079	+0.07%
1900	1,078	−0.02%

Year	Pop.	±% p.a.
1905	1,105	+0.50%
1910	1,134	+0.52%
1921	989	−1.24%
1926	943	−0.95%
1931	910	−0.71%
1936	846	−1.45%
1946	841	−0.06%
1954	863	+0.32%
1962	789	−1.11%
1968	800	+0.23%
1975	863	+1.09%
1982	915	+0.84%
1990	875	−0.56%
1999	924	+0.61%
2007	1,079	+1.96%
2012	1,145	+1.19%
2017	1,169	+0.42%
2023	1,254	+1.18%

Source: EHESS and INSEE

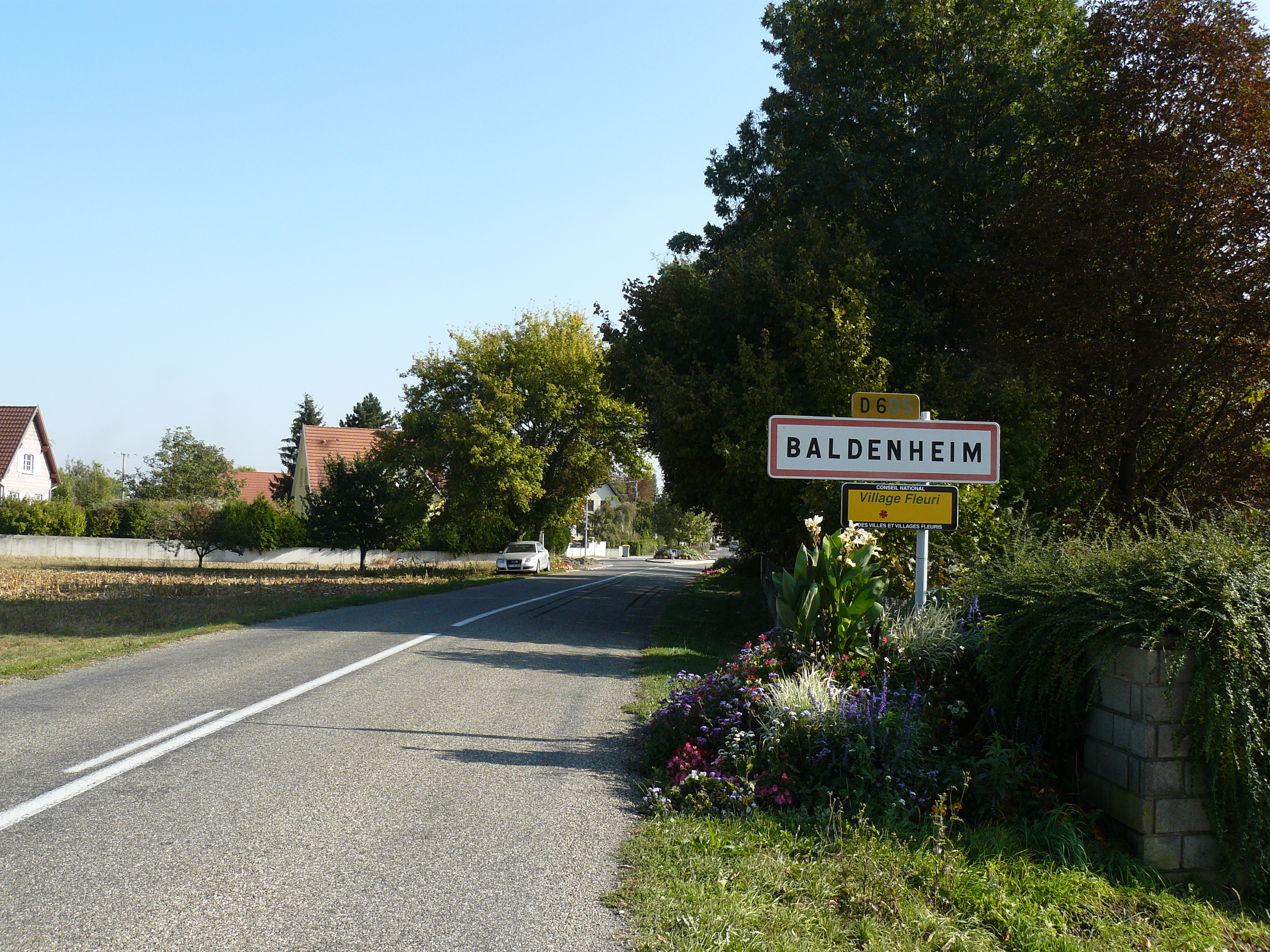
The entrance to the town

== Economy ==
The ratio of active population to total population of the commune has grown above the cantonal average. There is also evidence that unemployment has decreased.

Fruit and vegetables, flowers and plants are cultivated in the commune and there are a dozen pig farmers.

The number of farms has decreased but orchards are still important and the commune is known for its "white apples of Baldenheim".

The village enjoys a relatively high level of economic activity and expansion. There are 440 jobs available in the commune to over 1,000 inhabitants.

== Culture and heritage ==
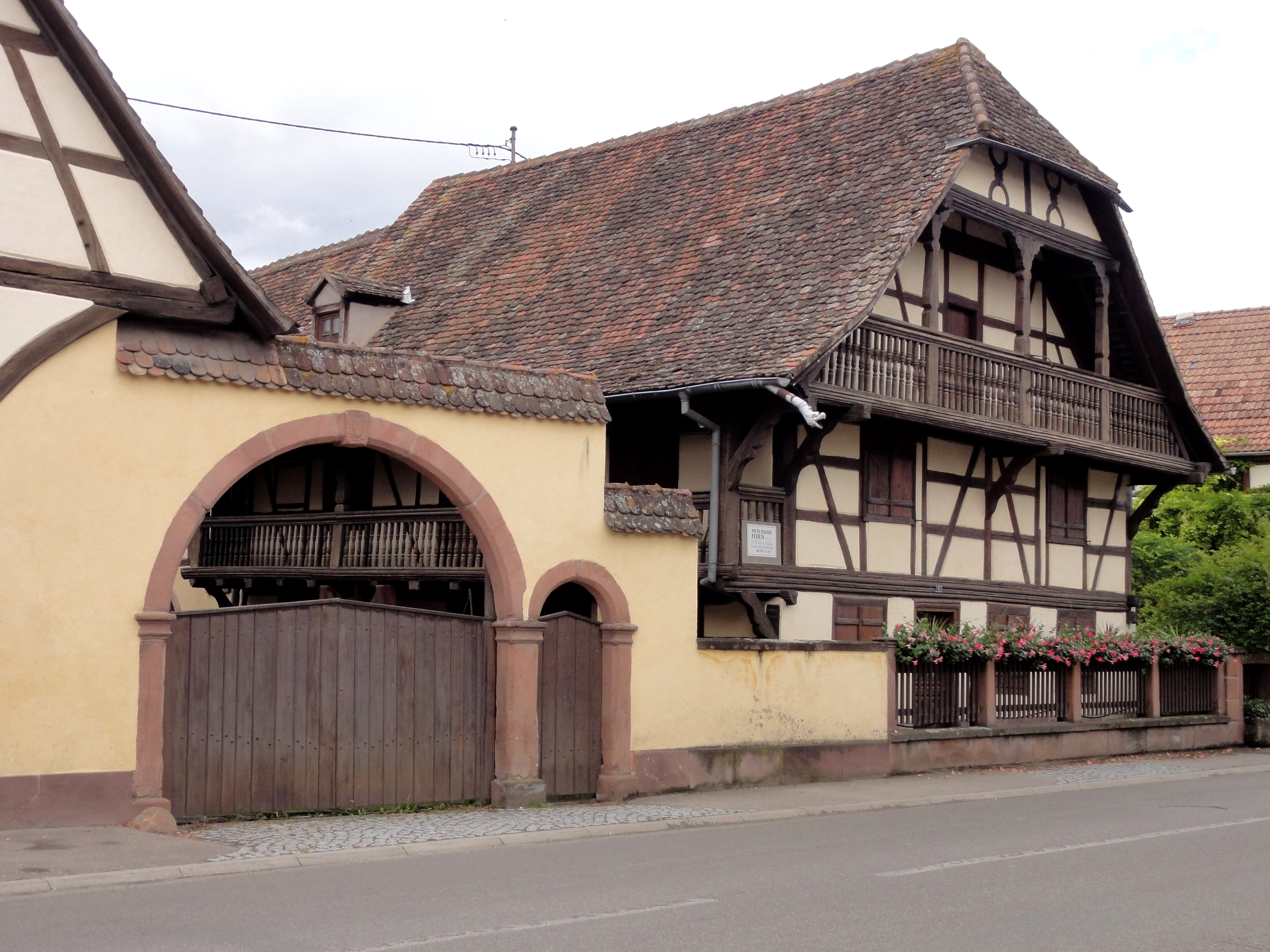
House at 4 rue Principale

=== Civil heritage ===
The commune has many buildings and structures that are registered as historical monuments:

- Farmhouses (16th-19th century)

Other sites of interest

- The Town Hall is on the former location of the communal school which existed from 1600 which for a long time provided separate courses for Catholic and Protestant children. The building has no date of construction. It consists of a hard ground floor and a half-timbered second floor. The hipped roof recalls the style of the presbyteries of the region or of some mansions. Only the traditional steeple signals the administrative function of the building. The Town Hall contains a High-relief: Head of a Woman (Middle Ages) which is registered as an historical object.
- A Gate at 27 rue Principale (1728) is registered as an historical object.
- An Empress Bench on D209 (19th century) is registered as an historical object.
- A Commemorative Plaque at 1 rue Principale (1557) is registered as an historical object.

=== Religious heritage ===
The commune has several religious buildings and sites that are registered as historical monuments:

- The Cemetery (19th century). The Cemetery has three items that are registered as historical objects:
  - A Funeral Monument for G. F. Ericgson and J. F. S. Blinder (19th century)
  - A Funeral Monument for P. F. Kreig (1807)
  - The Ornaments in the Cemetery
- The Lutheran Church (12th century). In the 7th century Baldenheim had a chapel or a church which was part of the property of Ebersmunster Abbey. The parish church is attested from 1371. The nave was enlarged during the Romanesque period or the beginning of the Gothic period. The Choir is from the 15th century. The bell tower was only accessible from within the choir. The slots for light were really Arrowslits and the presence of humpback stones in the corner stones, usually reserved for the military architecture, suggest a fortified building with a surveillance function. The Protestant Reformation was introduced in 1576 and resulted in changes to the building including the nave. Simultaneum mixtum (a "shared church") was established in the middle of the 18th century. In 1749, the Catholics regained possession of the choir until the construction of a new Catholic church in 1938. The Lords of Baldenheim, who owned the village, attended the service from their box hung like a balcony inside the choir. The access door to this box is still visible. The funeral plaques inside the church, made between the 15th and 18th century, show Alsatian noble history. Inside the church there are two tombstones for the Rathsamhausen family. In 1939, the return of exclusive Protestant worship lead to new works in the nave which were suspended because of the Second World War. The murals were updated during restoration work in 1992-1993 and date from the 14th and 15th centuries. Those in the choir were done using drawings by Martin Schongauer, the famous writer and Alsatian painter. This medieval painted decoration is of unique importance in Alsace. The church has many items that are registered as historical objects:
  - Monumental Paintings (14th-17th century). These paintings were probably made from the drawings of the famous Alsatian writer Martin Schongauer and were discovered during the restoration of the church in 1904. Other frescoes were found when working in the nave in 1939. Observations were then made and the paintings were covered with protective whitewash.
  - A Tombstone (16th century)
  - The Furniture in the Lutheran Church
  - A Protestant Communion water box (19th century)
  - A Baptismal Ewer (18th century)
  - A Baptismal Basin (1829)
  - A Communion Ewer (19th century)
  - Funeral Plaques (17th-18th century)
  - A Tombstone for A. von Truchsess von Rheinfelden
  - An Altar (15th century)
- The Catholic Church of Saint-Louis (1937). In 1576, the Parish Church of Saint Blaise became Protestant. Around 1758 a simultaneum (simultaneous worship) was established with the patron saint Louis in honour of Louis XIV. In the 19th century the simultaneous pursuit of both faiths encountered difficulties. Both religions practiced simultaneously and alternately in the churches, conducted by the people in place. To prevent access to the choir by the Lutherans it was closed off by a grill. Similarly, a large green curtain hid the tabernacle from their sight and, so as not to obstruct the view of the Catholic altar, the Lutherans equipped the curtain with wheels. The simultaneum lasted until 1938 when the new Catholic church was inaugurated. Violent clashes took place in 1843. The construction of a church dedicated to Catholic worship was then considered. The laying of the first stone was done only in 1937. It was Monseigneur Ruch, Bishop of Strasbourg, who came personally to consecrate Saint Louis church when it was completed in 1939, just before the start of the Second World War. The church has four items that are registered as historical objects:
  - A Sunburst Monstrance (19th century)
  - A Baptismal font (1766)
  - An Altar Lectern (1778)
  - The Furniture in the Church
- A Protestant Presbytery (18th century)

=== Church picture gallery ===
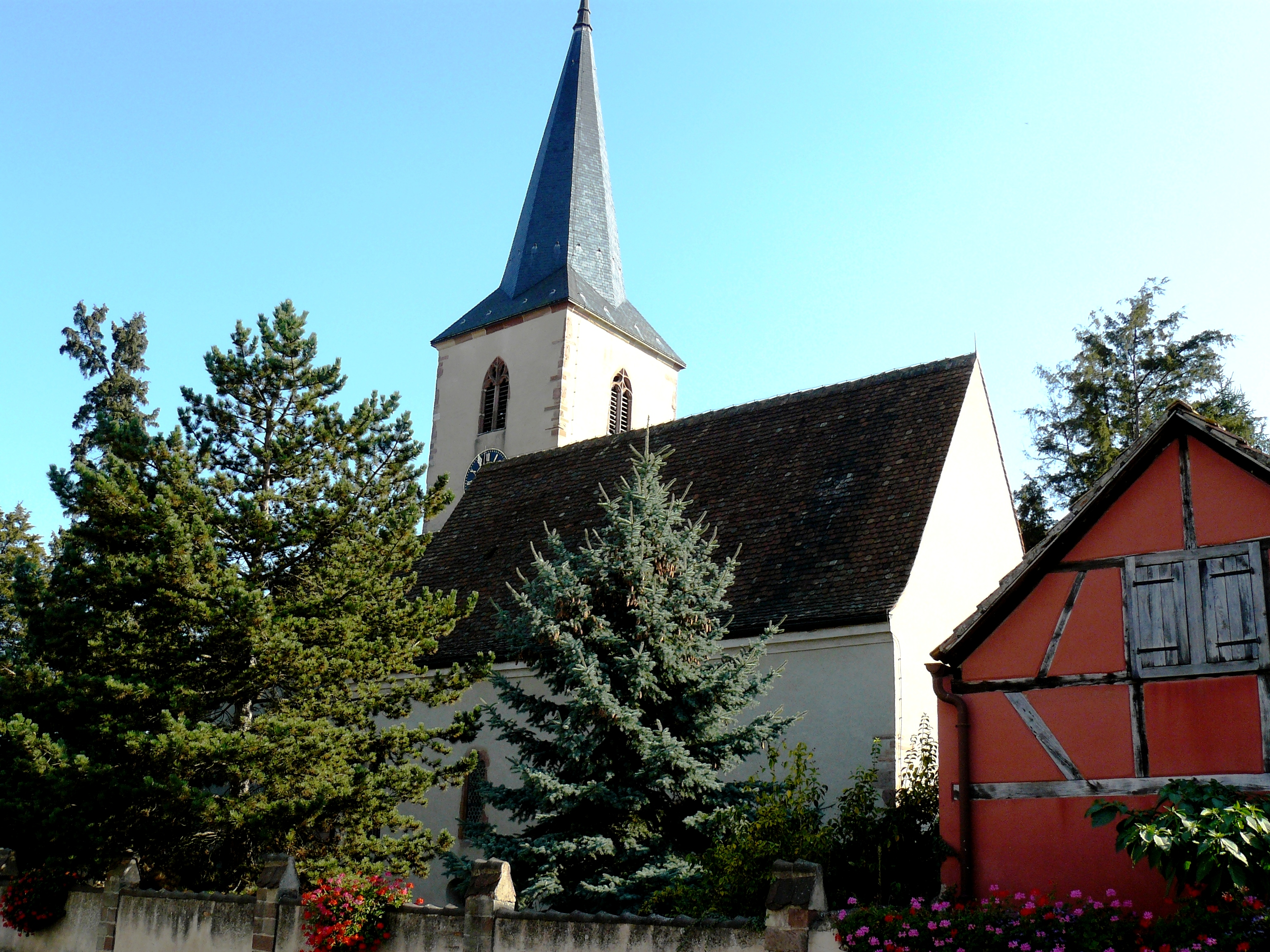
The medieval Protestant church

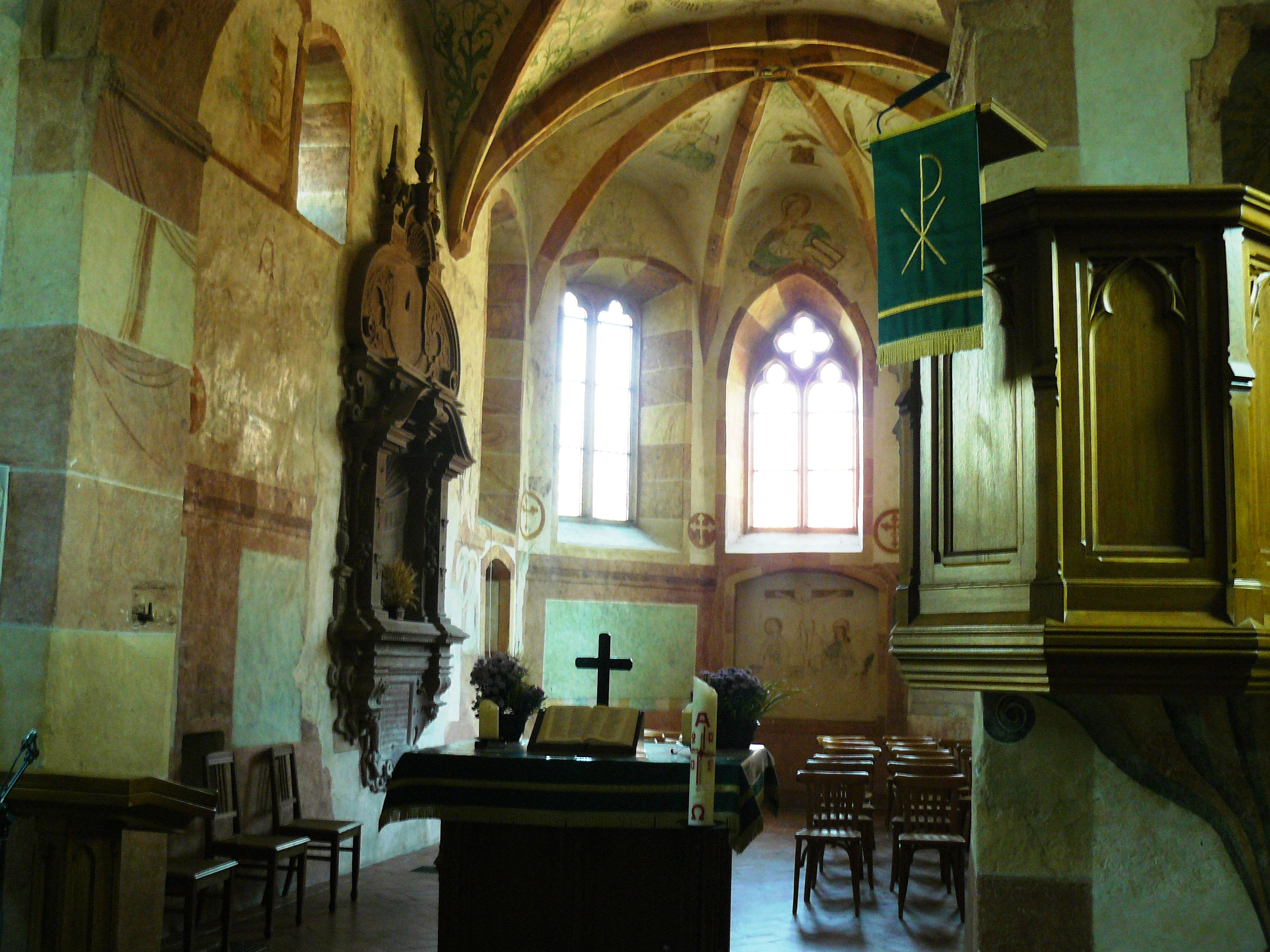
The nave of the Protestant church with frescoes from the 14th and 15th centuries

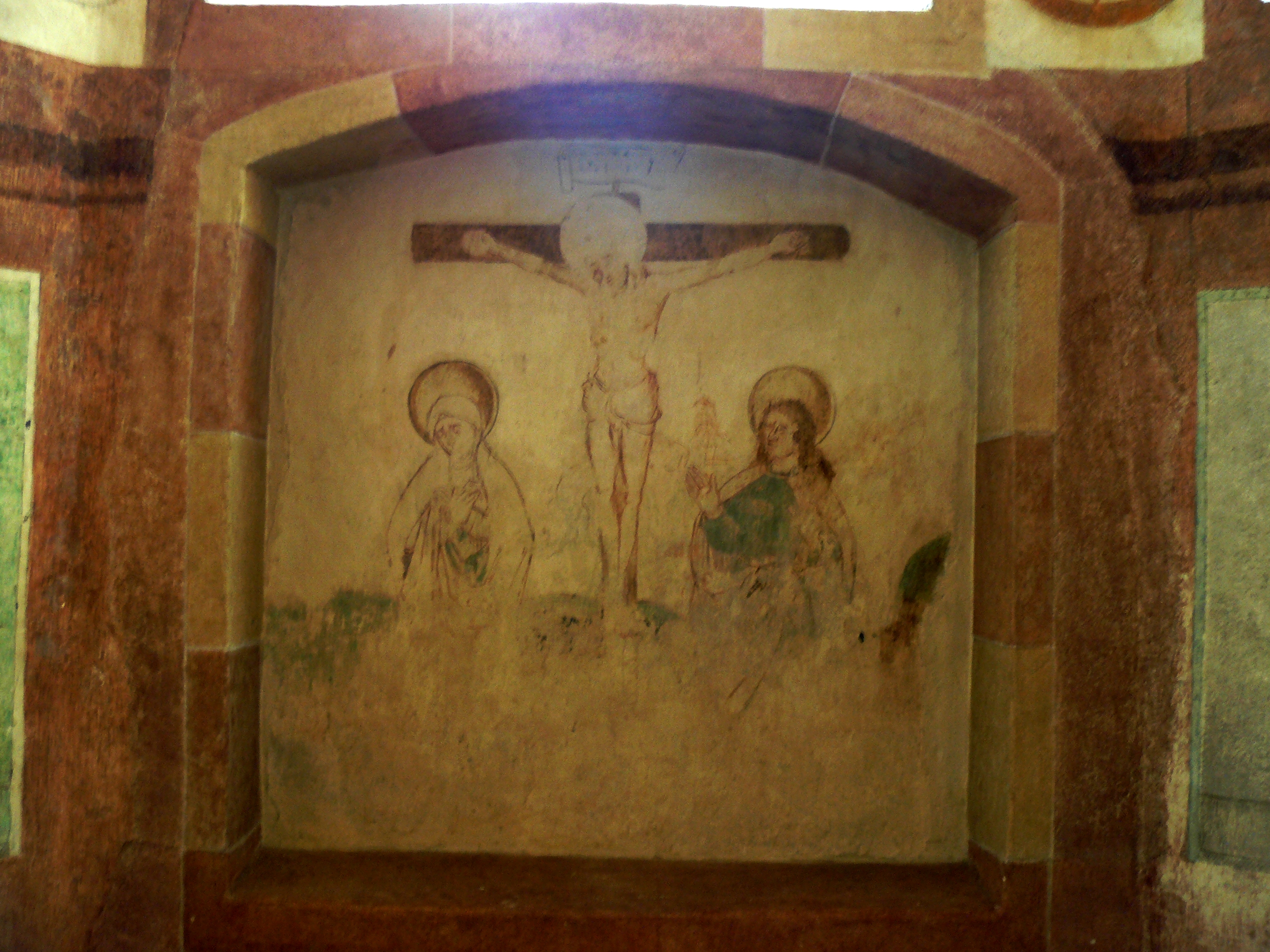
A 15th century mural in the nave of the Protestant church

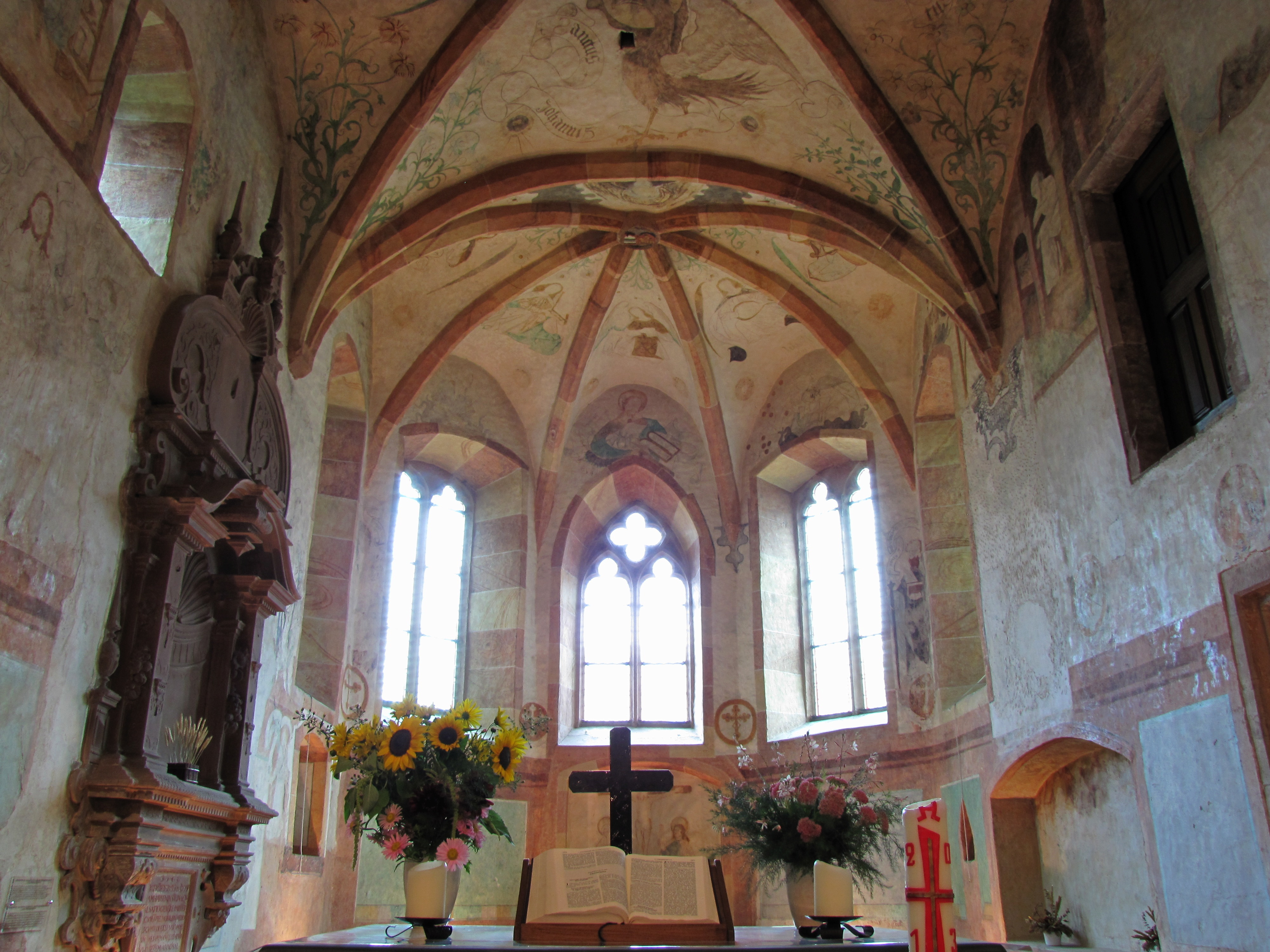
The choir

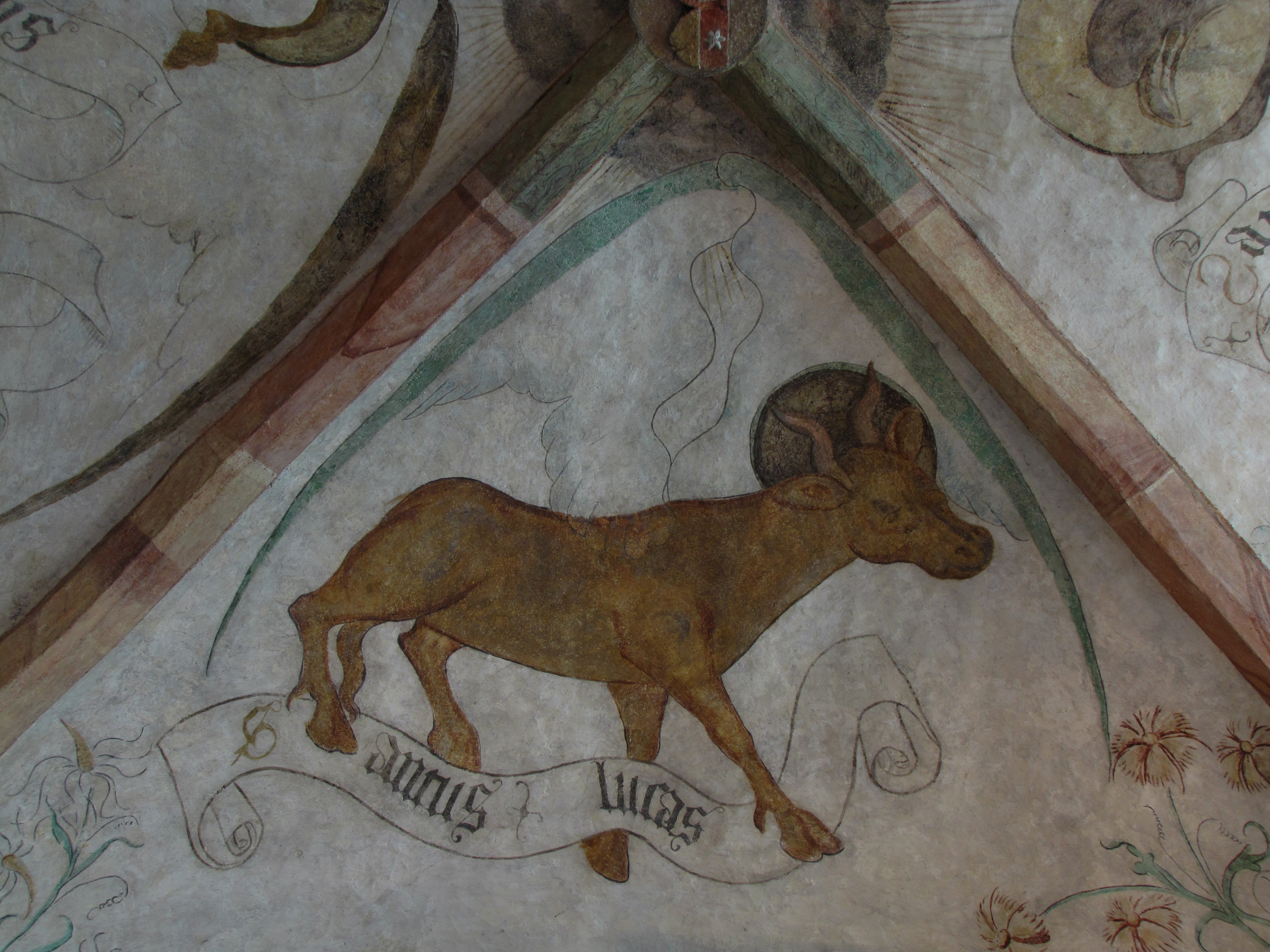
A 15th century fresco in the choir

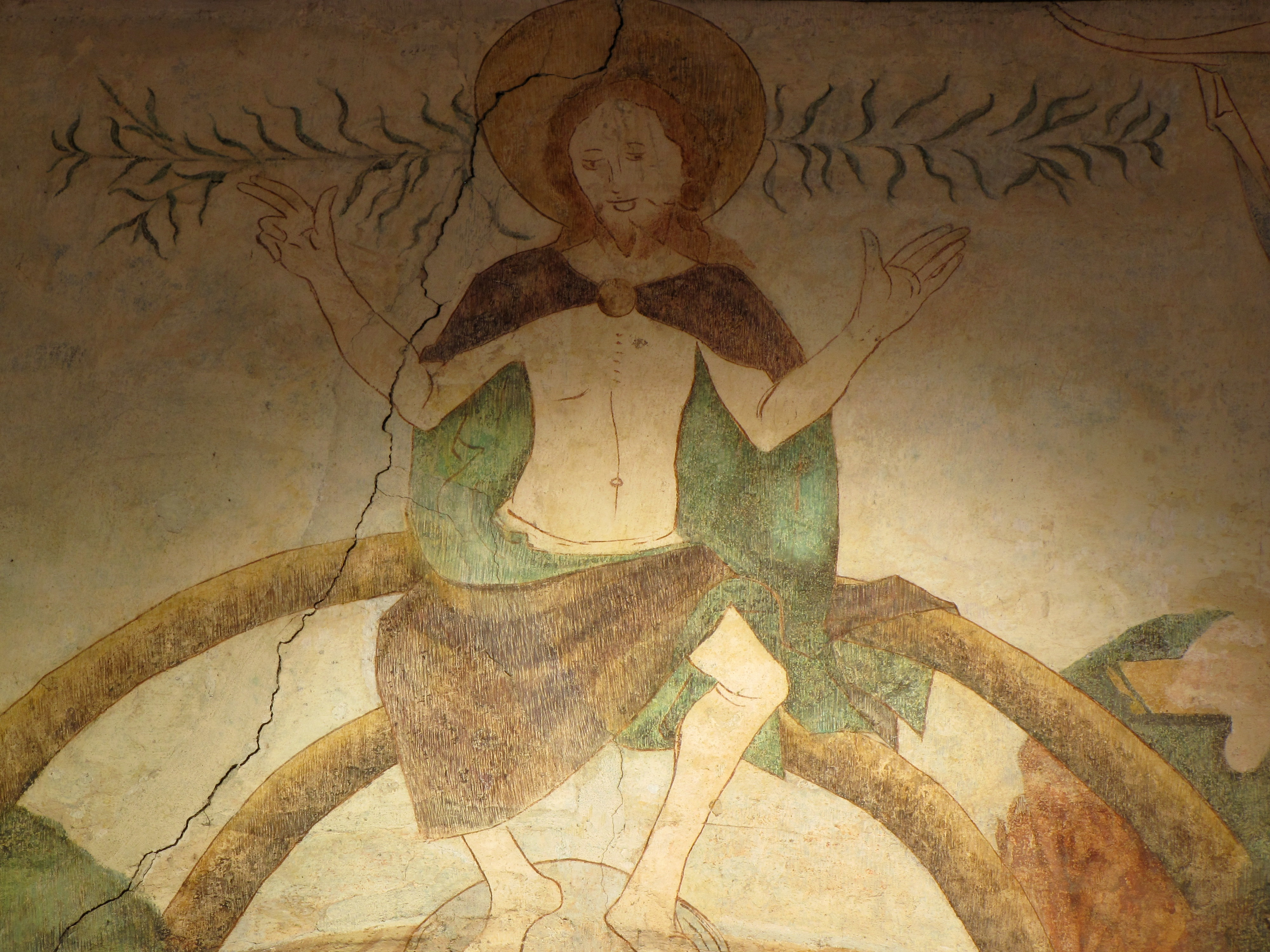
A 15th century fresco

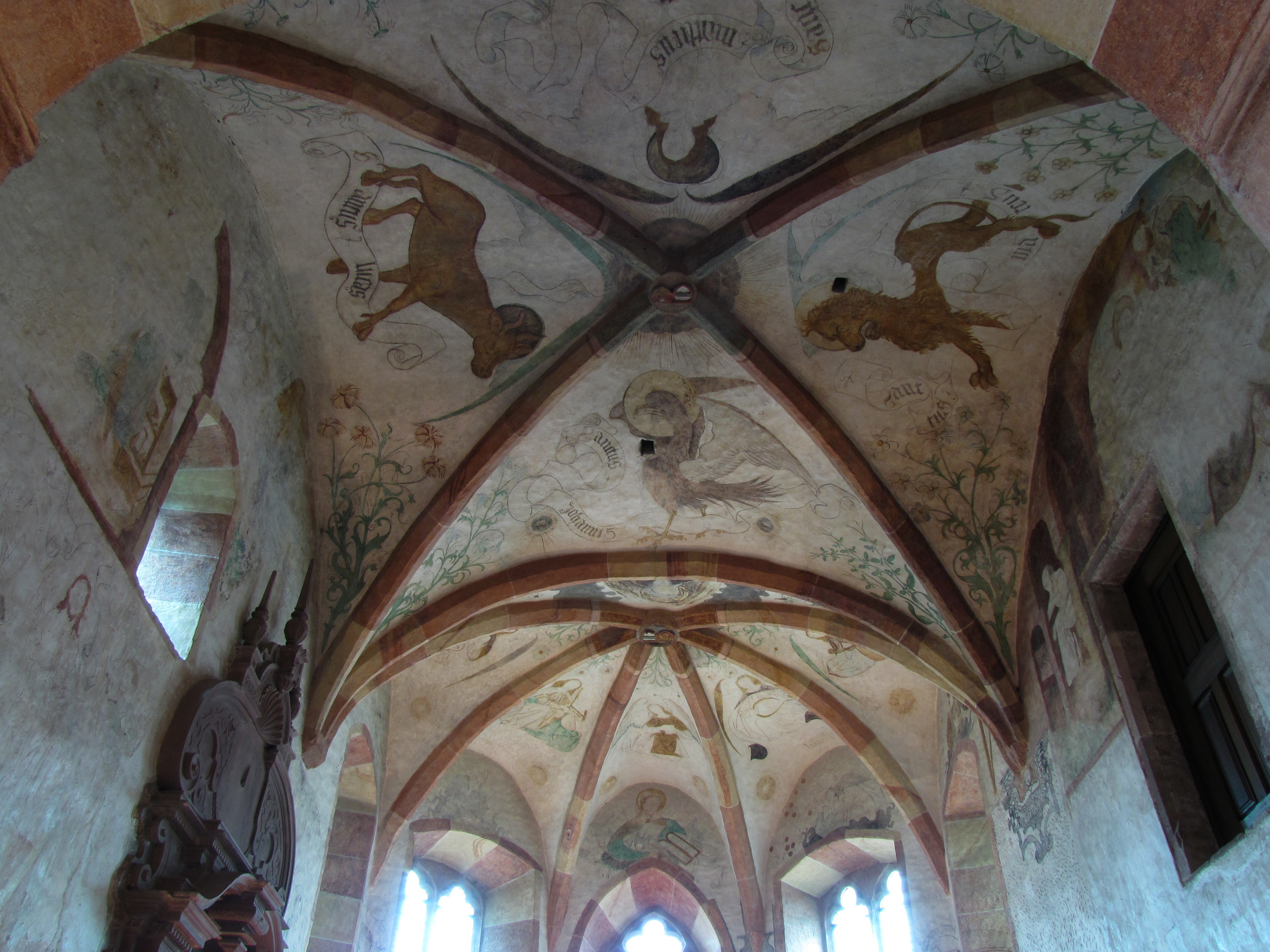
The ceiling of the church

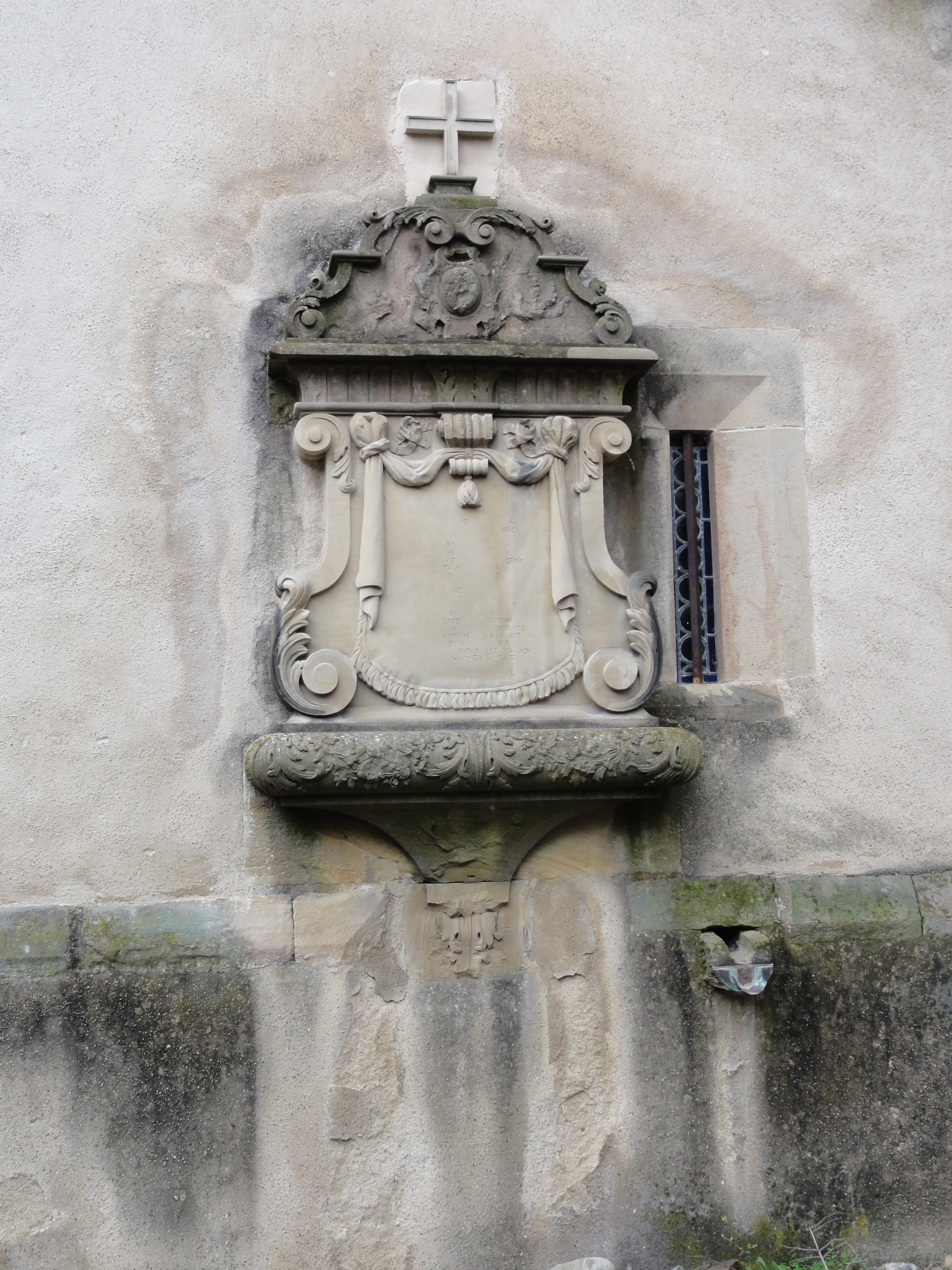
Funeral plaque

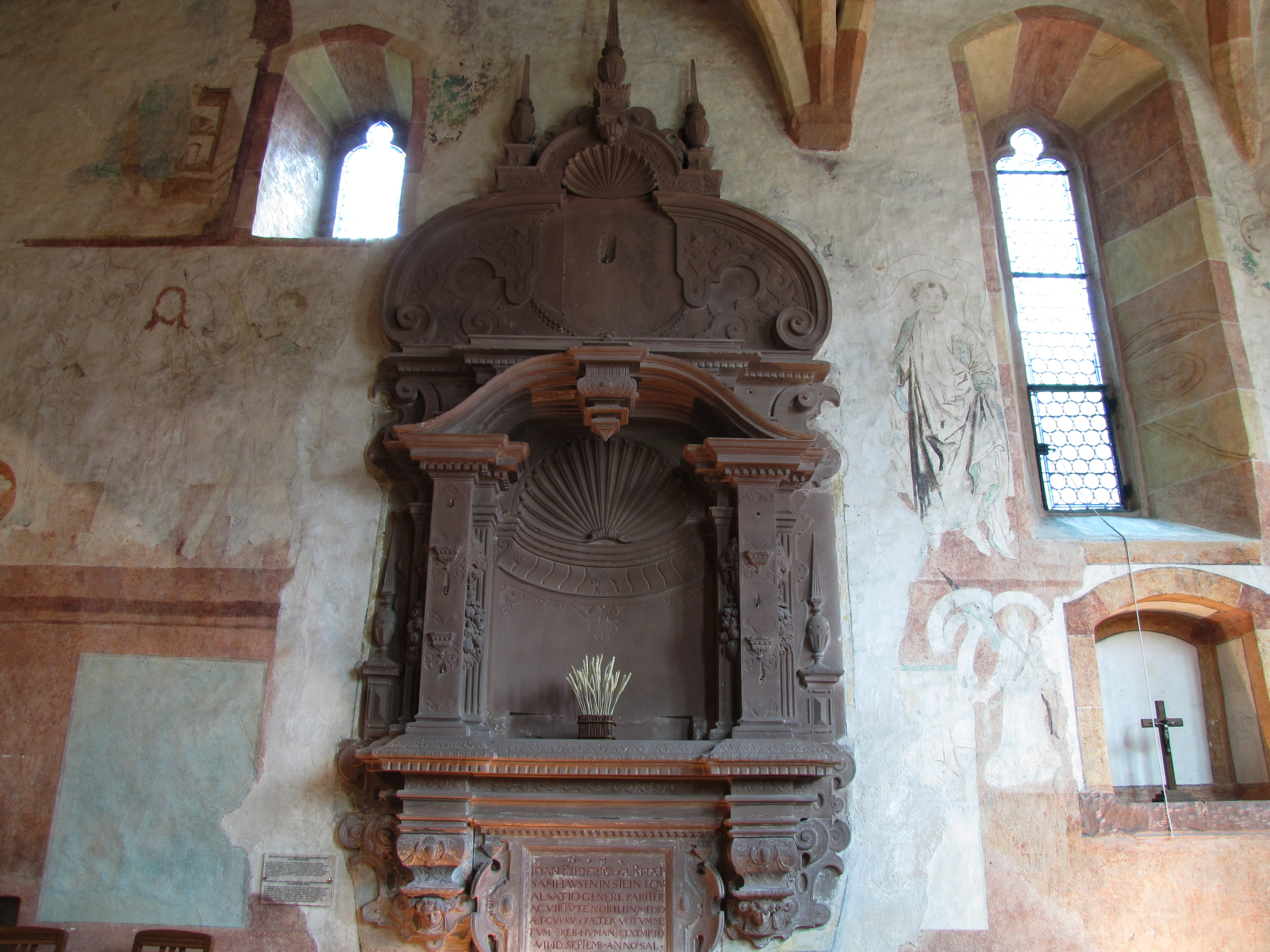
Funeral plaque for J. F. von Rathsamhausem zum Stein

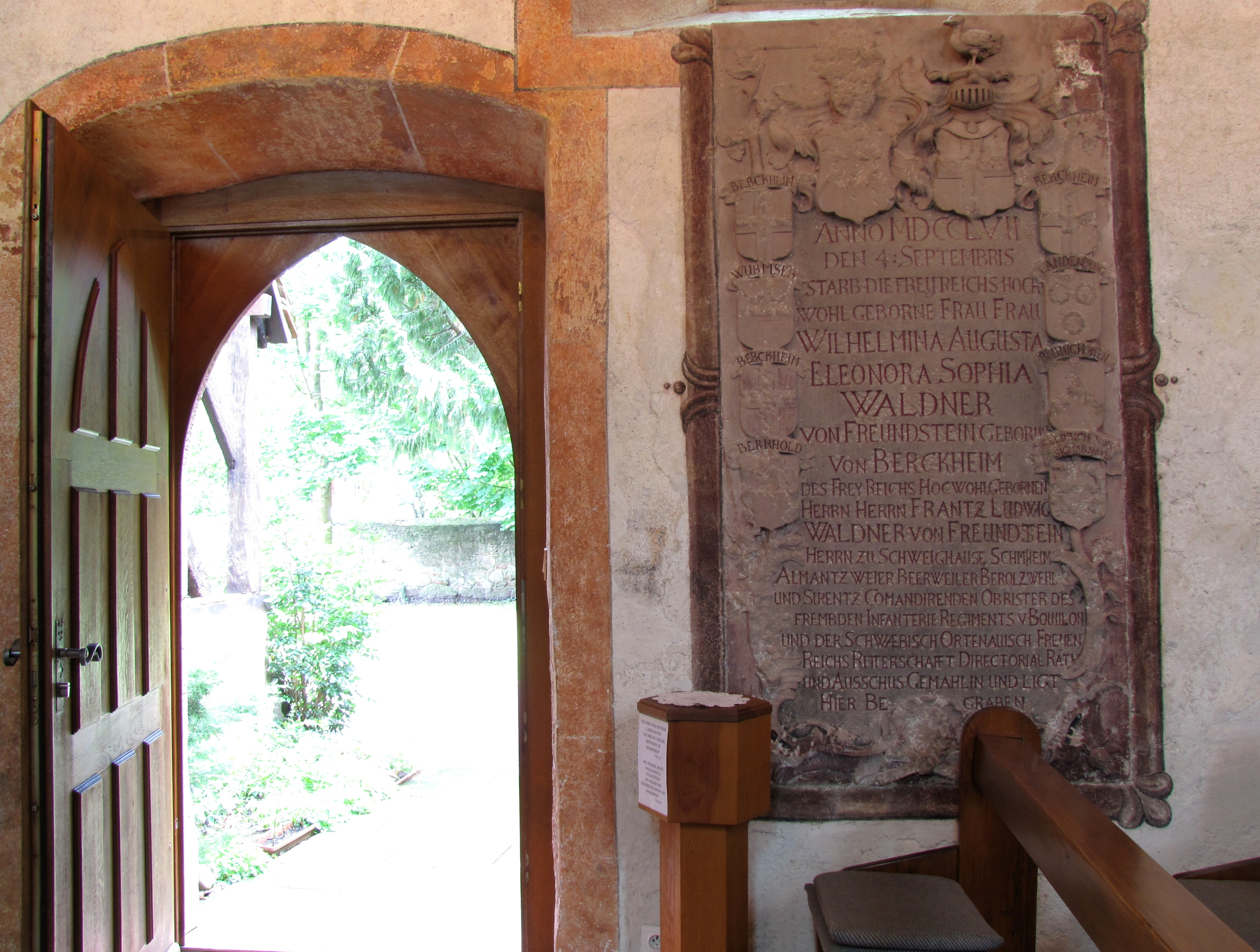
Funeral plaque for W. A. E. S. von Waldner von Freundstein

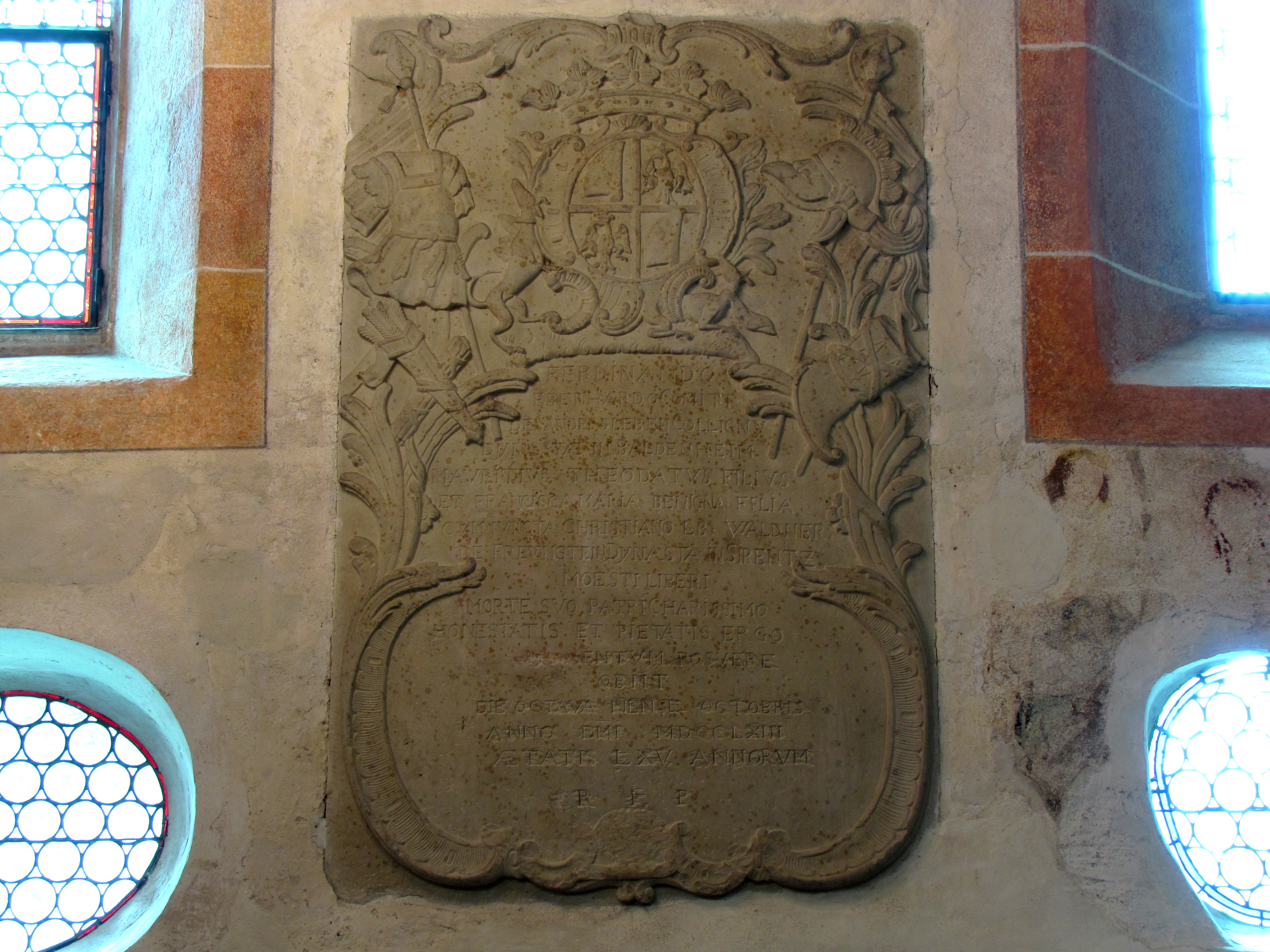
Funeral plaque for F. E. von Sandersleben-Coligny

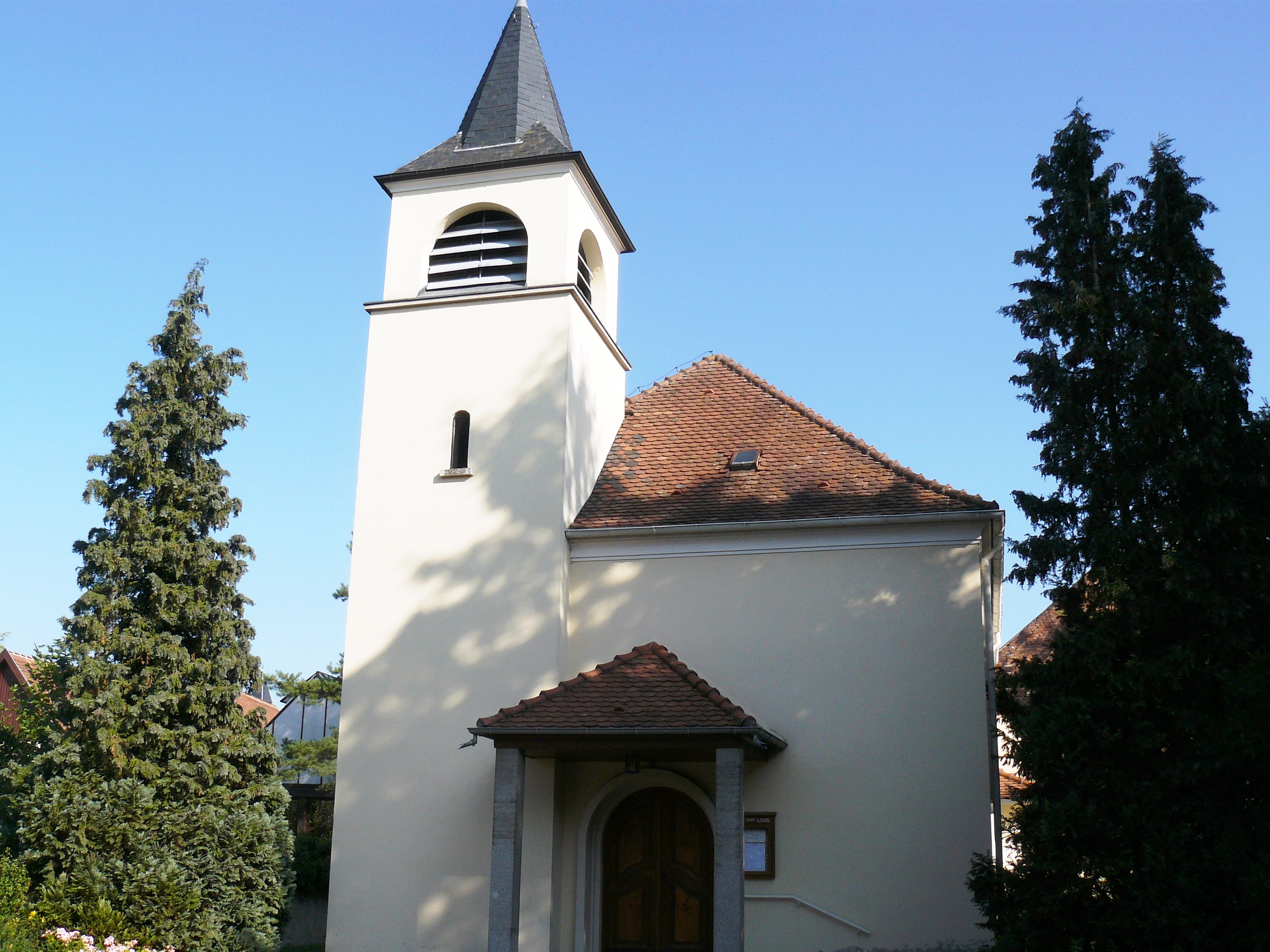
The Catholic church of Saint-Louis

== Notable people linked to the commune ==
- Viktor Nessler (1841-1890), composer, born in Baldenheim. In 1968, the commune put a plaque on his birthplace in his honour.
- Caspar Ott (1812-1876), tailor, born in Baldenheim. One of the earliest settlers of northeastern Illinois, his 1837 cabin is the oldest surviving structure in Lake County.

== See also ==
- Communes of the Bas-Rhin department

=== Bibliography ===
- P. Hirtx (2013). Registres paroissiaux protestants et état civil de Baldenheim - Mariages de 1684 à 1935 [Prostestant Parish and Civil Registers of Baldenheim - Marriages from 1684 to 1935] (in French).
