= William J. Frey =

American politician

Member of the Illinois House of Representatives

Personal details
- Party: Democratic

William J. Frey (November 8, 1929 – September 22, 2011) was an American farmer and politician.

Frey was born in Springfield, Illinois and graduated from the Cathedral Boys School. He served in the United States Army for two years. Frey lived with his wife and family in Pleasant Plains, Illinois. He was involved with the real estate business and with grain and cattle farming. Frey served in the Illinois House of Representatives in 1965 and 1966 and was a Democrat. He died at St. John Hospice in Springfield, Illinois.
