= Caspar Ott Cabin =

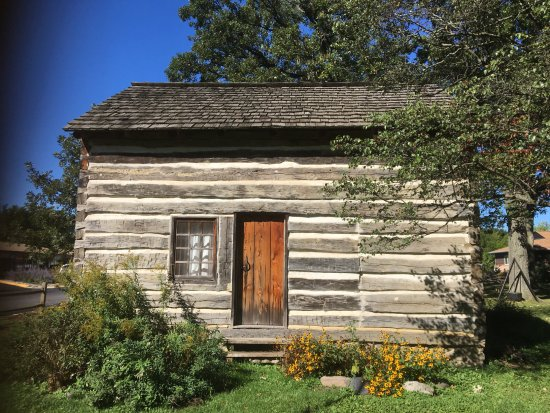

General information
- Architectural style: Log cabin
- Location: 517 Deerfield Road, Deerfield, Illinois
- Coordinates: 42.16653°N 87.83975°W
- Completed: 1837
- Renovated: 2001

The Caspar Ott Cabin is the oldest standing building in Lake County and one of the oldest in the state of Illinois. Built in 1837, it is located in the Deerfield Historic Village.

== History ==
The single-room log cabin belonged to the family of Caspar Ott, a French tailor born in Baldenheim just west of the Rhine River in 1812, as well as his German wife Elisabetha Trier, where both of them raised their seven children. The building's age, estimated to be from 1837 has been confirmed by the Lake County Convention & Visitors Bureau as the oldest still standing in the county. The home was originally one of 10 cabins that were located along modern day Saunders Road between Deerfield Road and Lake Cook Road.

One story that comes from the cabin is that in the winter of 1858, a 28 year old runaway enslaved man named Andrew Jackson (no relation to the former president) from Mississippi found refuge in Deerfield via the Underground Railroad. A man named Lyman Wilmot (namesake of Wilmot Elementary School) recommended the Ott family cabin. Jackson remained with the family until spring of 1859, and he helped to build a fence around the home in the meantime. Come spring, Caspar crafted the man a new suit, Wilmot travelled with him to Chicago, and paid for Jackson's ship fare headed further north.

Caspar died in 1876 and his wife Elisabetha in 1891. Both were buried in the small Loraine Cemetery in Loraine Township, Henry County. It seems prior to the turn of the century the cabin was abandoned. In 1970 the cabin was rediscovered underneath plaster of the dining room in the Siljerstrom farmhouse on Saunders Road. That same year, it was moved to the Deerfield Historic Village by the Deerfield Historical Society, which was founded just prior in 1968. In the 1990s a fundraising campaign began in order to pay for renovations which were completed in 2001. Largely in part by Bob Przewlocki. The Historic Village includes the cabin, the George Luther House (1847), the Bartle Sacker Farmhouse (1854), the Little Red Schoolhouse (c.1890), and the Carriage House (c.1905).
