= Iglehart House =

Charles Iglehart house
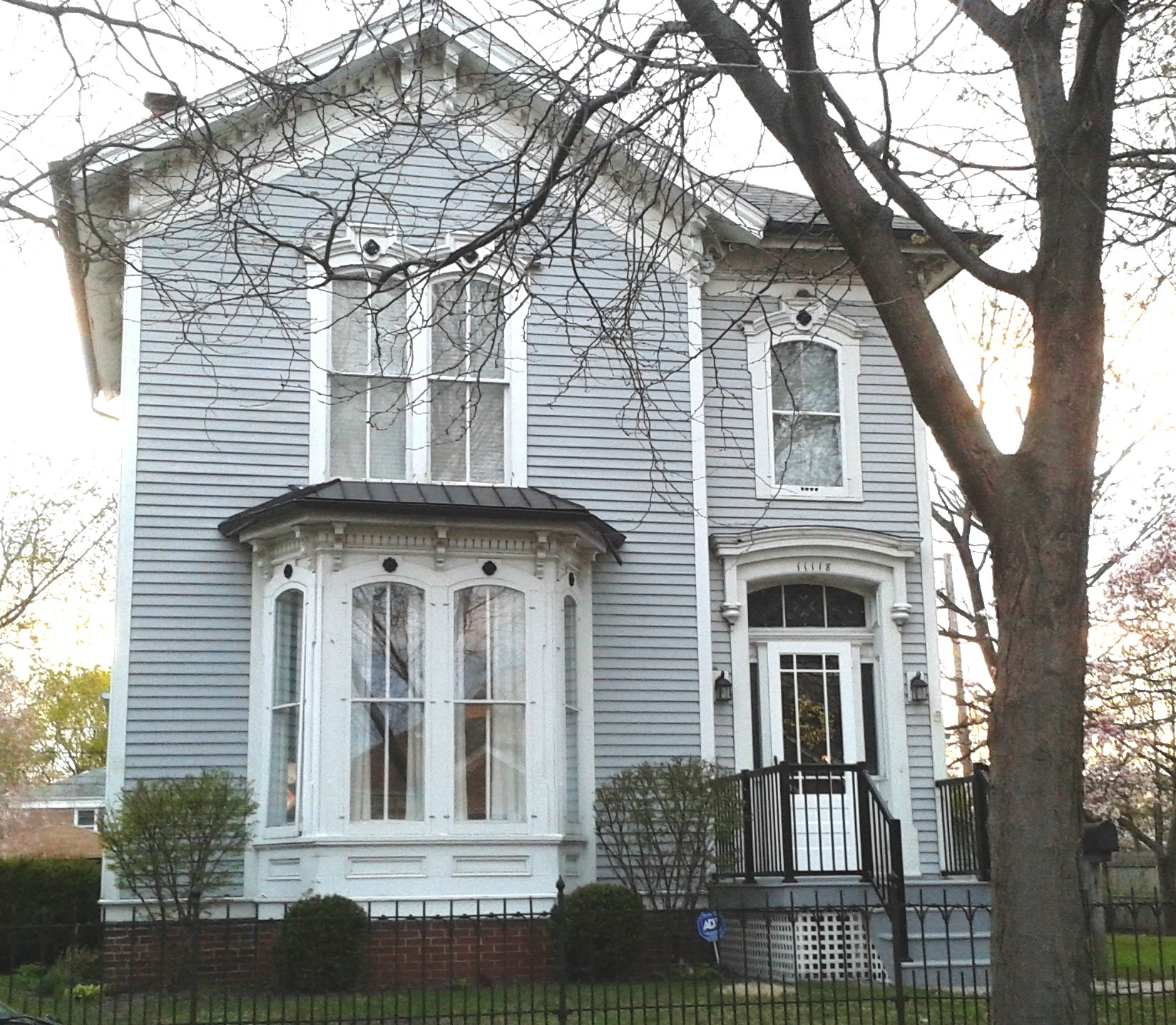
- Charles Iglehart house

Location
- Location: 11118 S. Artesian Avenue; Chicago, Illinois
- Interactive map of Charles Iglehart house
- Coordinates: 41.6912°N 87.6827°W

Architecture
- Style: Italianate architecture
- Completed: 1857

The Iglehart House is an Italianate style house in the Morgan Park neighborhood of Chicago, Illinois, United States, and one of the city's oldest surviving buildings.

Located at 11118 S. Artesian Avenue, the original portion of the house in the back was built in 1857 by an unknown architect for Charles D. Iglehart, whose farmstead comprised the land now bounded by 111th, 115th, and Rockwell streets and Western Avenue. Iglehart's daughter Mary, who was born in the house in 1857, is the first child whose birth is recorded in what would become the village of Morgan Park. Iglehart was one of the founders of The Church of the Mediator, whose first building was built in 1889 at 110th and Hoyne Avenue on land that was donated for it by the Blue Island Land and Building Company. Due to the space required of a growing family, the two-story front portion of the house was added in the 1870s. It was designated a Chicago Landmark on July 13, 1994.
