= Clayville, Illinois =

- Clayville Tavern
- U.S. National Register of Historic Places
- Location: 0.5 mi. SE of Pleasant Plains on IL 125
- Coordinates: 39°52′0″N 89°53′49″W
- Built: 1824
- Architectural style: Federal style
- Website: http://www.clayville.org
- NRHP reference No.: 73000718
- Added to NRHP: 1973-05-08

Clayville is a former roadside hamlet, inhabited from 1824 into the 1850s, located in Cartwright Township near Pleasant Plains, Illinois, United States. The settlement was never large but was firmly centered on a once-thriving tavern on the main road between the state capital of Springfield and the Illinois River port of Beardstown. The Broadwell Tavern continues to stand on its original foundation today as a reminder of the once-active frontier settlement.

== History ==
=== Tavern settlement ===
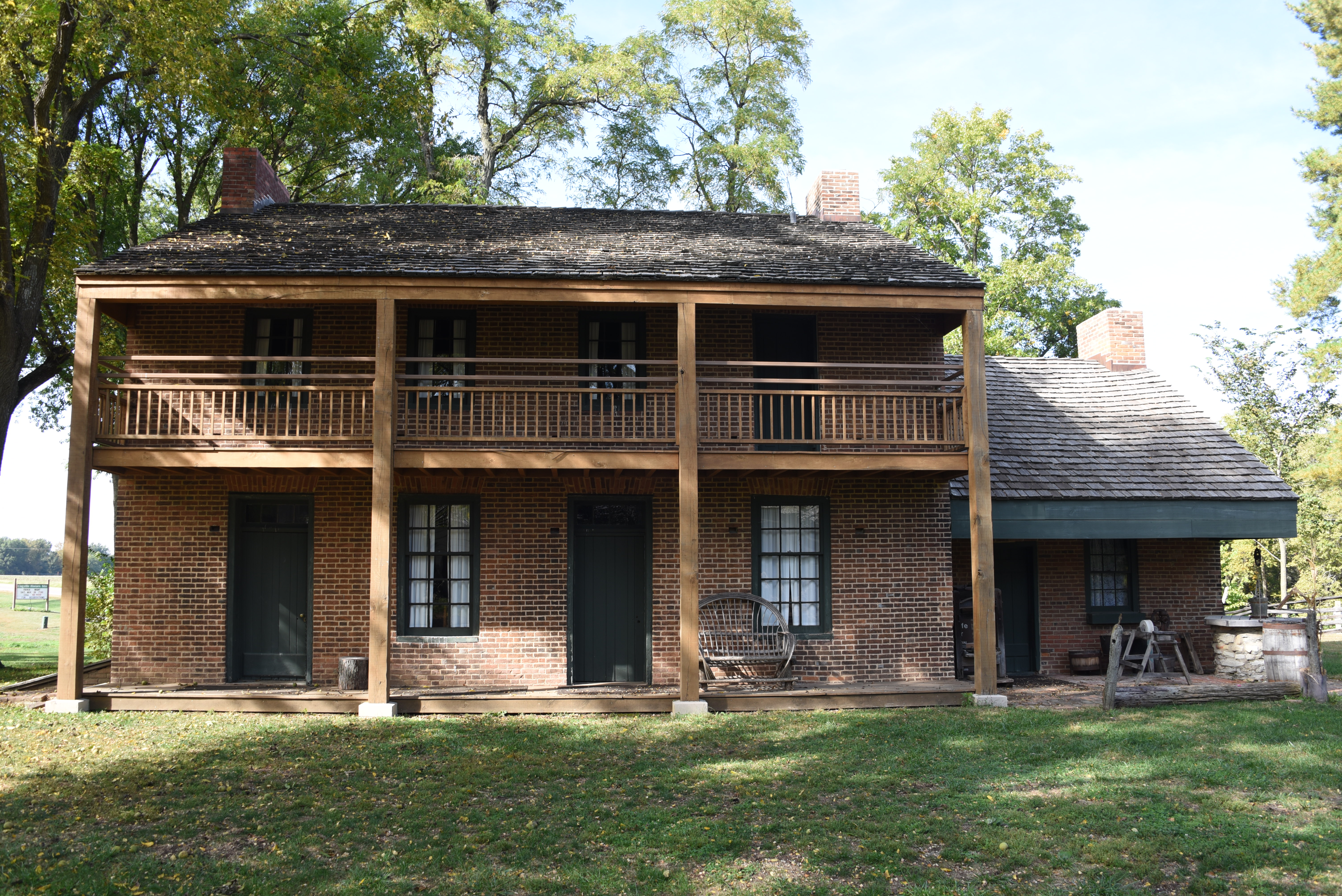
Broadwell Inn

The Broadwell Tavern was built in 1824 by innkeeper and land developer John Broadwell as an investment in the Springfield area. The businessman sensed that the nearby county seat of Springfield would grow and its residents would need to travel in and out. On the American frontier in the 1830s, a tavern typically doubled as a logistics center. The drivers of slow-moving, horse-drawn drays needed a place to spend the night where their horses could be fed and watered. Illinois law required taverns to provide these services as condition of receiving a license to serve alcohol by the drink. Although the hospitality of the Broadwell Tavern was never luxurious, the tavern's fireplaces kept the brick tavern warm, and glass windows helped encourage the guests to get up early and resume their journeys. The tavern was built in a vernacular Federal style, similar to English country inns. It is the oldest brick building in Sangamon County.

During its primary period of operations, the 1830s and early 1840s, the Sangamon River valley was connected with steamboat traffic on the Illinois River by stagecoaches. Like drays and other wagons, the stagecoaches needed places to stop for food, sleep, water, and other beverages. The tavern's first-floor kitchen and barroom may have served guests, including patrons using the second-floor sleeping rooms. Other visitors may have found space in now-vanished adjacent structures. Traffic to and from Springfield grew further after the central Illinois town was named Illinois' permanent state capital in 1837. The successful inn drew other settlers to "Clayville", which tavernkeeper Broadwell had named after a political hero, presidential candidate and Whig Party leader Henry Clay. Broadwell's admiration for Clay would have drawn him towards a fellow local admirer of the Kentucky politician, lawyer Abraham Lincoln. Legal records show that Broadwell retained Lincoln as his counsel on four separate occasions.

In 1847, however, John Broadwell sold the tavern. By the 1850s, the coming of railroad technology to central Illinois was eliminating the need for taverns serving horse-drawn traffic. The stagecoach road was eventually paved for motor vehicle traffic in the early 1900s, becoming Illinois Route 125, but this did not restore the failed tavern to life. The tavern's jobs had disappeared and the center of local settlement in the township became the nearby rural town of Pleasant Plains. The hamlet's wooden structures vanished, leaving the abandoned brick tavern as the only survivor of the former settlement.

=== Ghost town ===
Residents of Sangamon County took steps, starting in the late 1900s, to preserve Broadwell Tavern and reconstruct adjacent wooden structures as a combined work of historic preservation and local open-air museum. After an effort to operate the tavern and museum under the auspices of Sangamon State University (a predecessor of the University of Illinois at Springfield) failed in 1992, the tavern was once again abandoned and allowed to deteriorate.

Clayville Tavern was added to the National Register of Historic Places in May 1973.

Preservation efforts, led by Pleasant Plains neighbors, resumed in 2009. "Clayville Historic Site", a purpose-organized nonprofit closely affiliated with the Pleasant Plains Historical Society, acquired the abandoned tavern and adjacent land parcels in 2010. Clayville Historic Site, as of 2015, operates an annual spring festival, summer folk music meet, fall festival, several car cruise-ins, and haunted house festival at the ghost townsite, and has refitted the tavern to restore the exterior and partly restore the interior to its operational appearance in the 1840s.
