= Black Homestead Farm =

- U.S. National Register of Historic Places
- U.S. Historic district
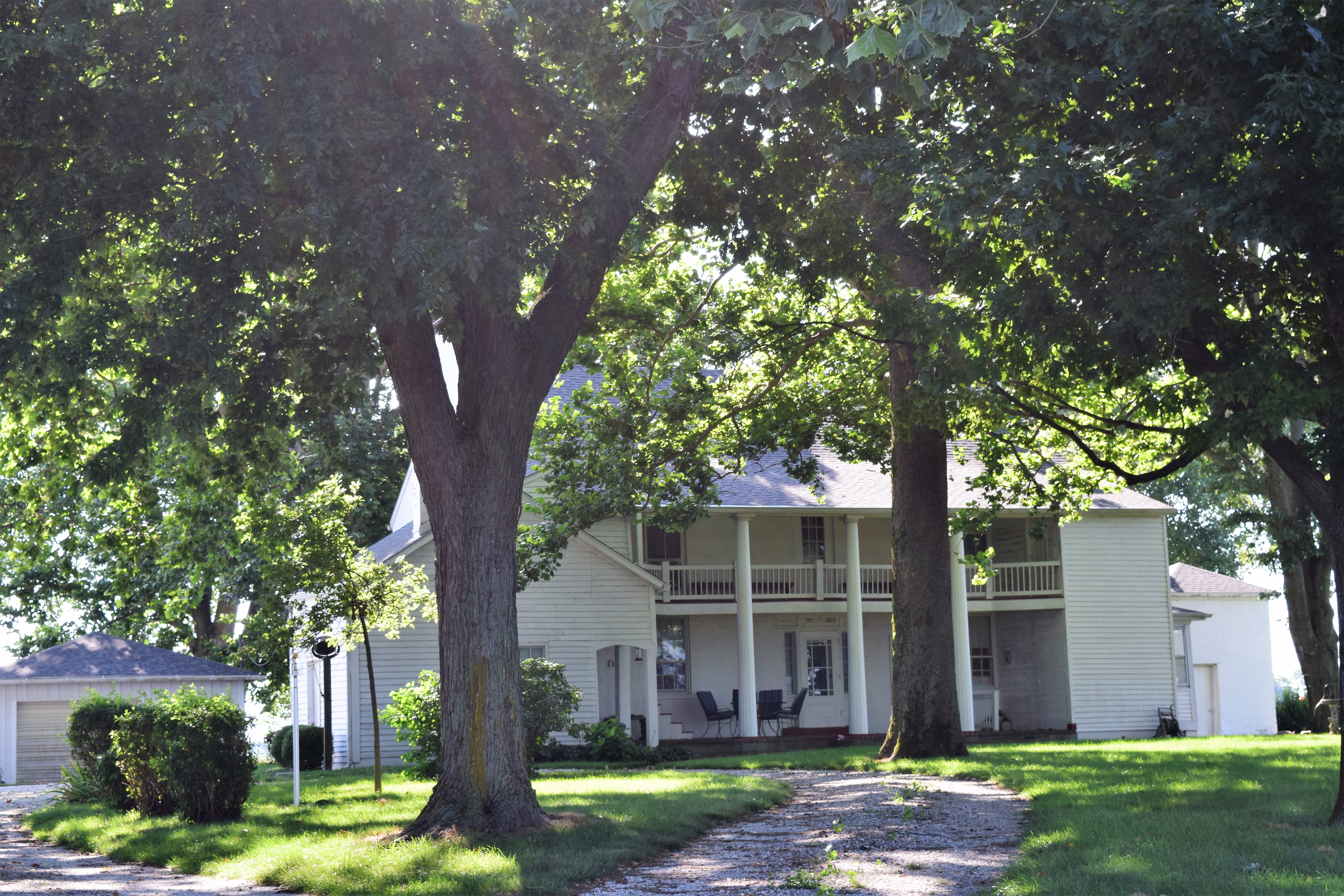

- Location within Illinois Location within the United States
- Location: RR 3, Carrollton, Illinois
- Coordinates: 39°17′37″N 90°26′45″W
- Area: 123 acres (50 ha)
- Built: 1823
- Architect: Reay, William
- Architectural style: Federal, Greek Revival
- NRHP reference No.: 05000110
- Added to NRHP: May 24, 2005

The Black Homestead Farm is a historic farm located west of Carrollton in Greene County, Illinois. Margaret Black, one of the county's first settlers, established the farm in 1821. The farmhouse, built two years later, is the oldest surviving house in Greene County. Architect William Reay designed the brick Federal house, which features a symmetrical plan with evenly spaced windows, an oval fanlight above the original main entrance, and a gable roof with chimneys at each end. A new entrance with a Greek Revival porch was placed on the house in 1855. Other 19th-century farm buildings on the property include a smokehouse, wash house, carriage house, and horse barn. The farm raised livestock and grew grain through the 19th and 20th centuries, as was typical of Greene County farms; it still has active corn and soybean crops.

The farm was added to the National Register of Historic Places on May 24, 2005.
