= Pleasant Plains, Illinois =

Pleasant Plains
- Village
- Location of Pleasant Plains in Sangamon County, Illinois.
- Coordinates: 39°52′36″N 89°55′04″W
- Country: United States
- State: Illinois
- County: Sangamon
- Incorporated: April 8, 1876

Area
  - Total: 1.34 sq mi (3.46 km^{2})
  - Land: 1.34 sq mi (3.46 km^{2})
  - Water: 0 sq mi (0.00 km^{2})
- Elevation: 614 ft (187 m)

Population (2020)
  - Total: 808
  - Density: 605.2/sq mi (233.65/km^{2})
- Time zone: UTC-6 (CST)
  - Summer (DST): UTC-5 (CDT)
- ZIP code: 62677
- Area code: 217
- FIPS code: 17-60599
- GNIS feature ID: 2399694
- Website: pleasantplainsillinois.com

Pleasant Plains is a village in Sangamon County, Illinois, United States. The population was 809 at the 2020 census. It is part of the Springfield, Illinois Metropolitan Statistical Area. The village was incorporated April 8, 1876

== Geography ==
According to the 2010 census, Pleasant Plains has a total area of 1.4 square miles (3.63 km^{2}), all land.

== Demographics ==
Historical population
| Census | Pop. | Note | %± |
|---|---|---|---|
| 1880 | 417 | | — |
| 1890 | 518 | | 24.2% |
| 1900 | 575 | | 11.0% |
| 1910 | 625 | | 8.7% |
| 1920 | 1,078 | | 72.5% |
| 1930 | 486 | | −54.9% |
| 1940 | 531 | | 9.3% |
| 1950 | 500 | | −5.8% |
| 1960 | 518 | | 3.6% |
| 1970 | 644 | | 24.3% |
| 1980 | 688 | | 6.8% |
| 1990 | 701 | | 1.9% |
| 2000 | 777 | | 10.8% |
| 2010 | 802 | | 3.2% |
| 2020 | 808 | | 0.7% |
U.S. Decennial Census

As of the census of 2020, there were 809 people, 310 households, and 228 families residing in the village. The population density was 626.0 inhabitants per square mile (241.7/km^{2}). There were 310 housing units at an average density of 255.4 per square mile (98.6/km^{2}). The racial makeup of the village was 97.4% White, 0.5% African American, 0.4% Asian, and 1.3% from two or more races. Hispanic or Latino of any race were 0.9% of the population.

There were 310 households, out of which 36.8% had children under the age of 18 living with them, 57.1% were married couples living together, 11.6% had a female householder with no husband present, and 26.5% were non-families. 23.2% of all households were made up of individuals, and 10.4% had someone living alone who was 65 years of age or older. The average household size was 2.59 and the average family size was 3.00.

In the village, the population was spread out, with 28.2% under the age of 18, 5.2% from 20 to 24, 26.5% from 25 to 44, 25.8% from 45 to 64, and 13.0% who were 65 years of age or older. The median age was 38.5 years. 47.1% of the population was male and 52.9% of the population was female.

The median income for a household in the village was $46,053, and the median income for a family was $51,111. Males had a median income of $38,482 versus $25,446 for females. The per capita income for the village was $18,714. About 3.5% of families and 2.9% of the population were below the poverty line, including 4.7% of those under age 18 and none of those age 65 or over.

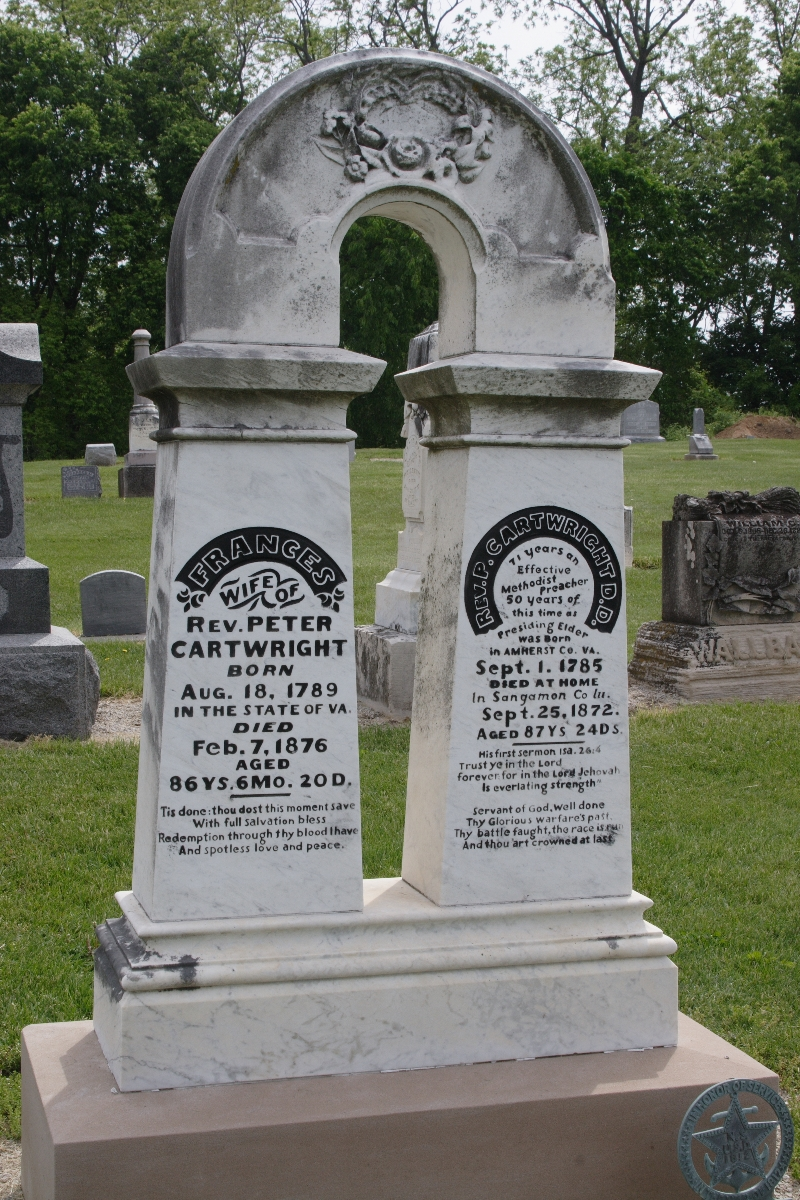
Peter Cartwright's tombstone

== Pleasant Plains Historical Society ==
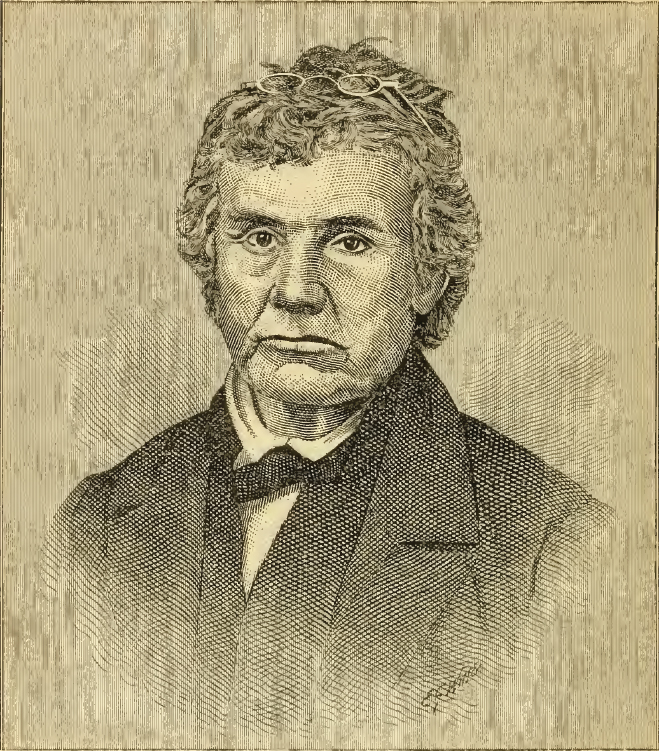
Peter Cartwright

In an effort to re-connect to its historical roots, the Pleasant Plains Historical Society was created by mayor Jim Verkuilan and his friends in 2009. Its stated purpose is “To acquire, restore and maintain historical sites surrounding the community.” The Historical Society promptly took steps to purchase the Clayville, Illinois site, a goal accomplished in 2010. Clayville, a Lincoln-era stagecoach stop, had been operated by a predecessor of the University of Illinois Springfield from the 1970s until 1992. The Pleasant Plains Historical Society's affiliate, Clayville Historic Site, now operates the stagecoach stop and 1824 tavern building.

== Notable people ==
- Peter Cartwright, politician and Methodist church leader
- William J. Frey, Illinois state legislator, farmer, and businessman
- James F. Short Jr., sociologist
