= Community of Communes Ackerland =

French intercommunal structure

The Community of Communes Ackerland (French: Communauté de communes Ackerland) is a former French intercommunal structure gathering most of the communes of the Ackerland natural region, next to Kochersberg, département of Bas-Rhin, région Alsace. It was created in January 2000. Its administrative offices were located at Ittenheim. It was merged into the Communauté de communes du Kochersberg in January 2013.

The Communauté de communes comprised the following communes:

- Furdenheim
- Handschuheim
- Hurtigheim
- Ittenheim
- Quatzenheim
