= Ittenheim =

Ittenheim Ittene
- Commune
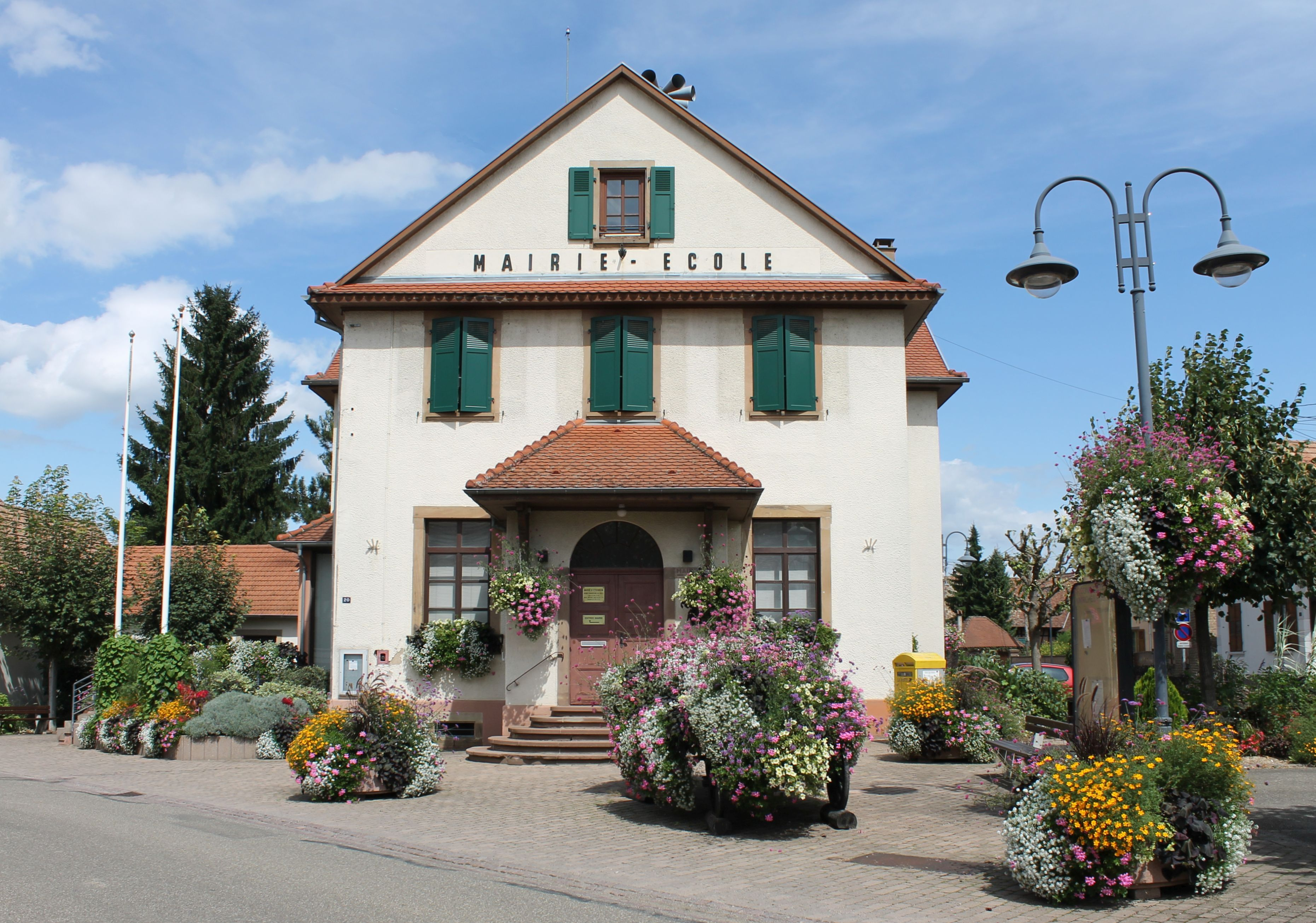
- The town hall and school in Ittenheim

- Coat of arms
- Location of Ittenheim
- Location within France Location within Grand Est
- Coordinates: 48°36′18″N 7°35′43″E
- Country: France
- Region: Grand Est
- Department: Bas-Rhin
- Arrondissement: Saverne
- Canton: Bouxwiller
- Intercommunality: CC Kochersberg

Government
  - Mayor (2020–2026): Alain Grosskost
- Area^{1}: 6.71 km^{2} (2.59 sq mi)
- Highest elevation: 212 m (696 ft)
- Lowest elevation: 152 m (499 ft)
- Population (2023): 2,108
  - Density: 314/km^{2} (814/sq mi)
- Time zone: UTC+01:00 (CET)
  - Summer (DST): UTC+02:00 (CEST)
- INSEE/Postal code: 67226 /67117
- ^{1} French Land Register data, which excludes lakes, ponds, glaciers > 1 km^{2} (0.386 sq mi or 247 acres) and river estuaries.

Ittenheim (French pronunciation: [itənaim]; Alsatian: Ittene) is a commune in the Bas-Rhin department in Grand Est in north-eastern France.

== Geography ==
Ittenheim is positioned ten kilometres (six miles) to the west of Strasbourg. The little town is crossed by the departmental road RD1004 (formerly Route Nationale 4): before the development of the autoroute network, Ittenheim was the first village passed through by motorists after leaving Strasbourg en route for Paris.

Adjacent communes are Hurtigheim to the north and Handschuheim to the west.

== Population ==
Historical population
Year	Pop.	±% p.a.
1968	911	—
1975	1,060	+2.19%
1982	1,230	+2.15%
1990	1,594	+3.29%
1999	1,904	+1.99%
2007	2,144	+1.50%
2012	2,170	+0.24%
2017	2,111	−0.55%
2023	2,108	−0.02%
Source: INSEE

== Celebrity connection ==
One of the inhabitants of Ittenheim may have saved the life of President Jacques Chirac during the 2002 Bastille Day parade. Chirac was targeted by a right-wing extremist gunman named Maxime Brunerie: the man who disarmed the gunman, thereby thwarting a presidential assassination, is called Jacques Weber.

== Notable people ==
Nikolaus Ager (1568–1634), botanist, was born in Ittenheim

== See also ==
- Communes of the Bas-Rhin department
- Kochersberg
