= Griesheim =

Griesheim may refer to:

- Griesheim, Hesse, a town in Hesse, Germany
- Griesheim (Frankfurt am Main), a city district of Frankfurt am Main, Hesse, Germany
- Griesheim-sur-Souffel, a commune in Alsace, France
- Griesheim-près-Molsheim, a commune in Alsace, France
