= Souffel =

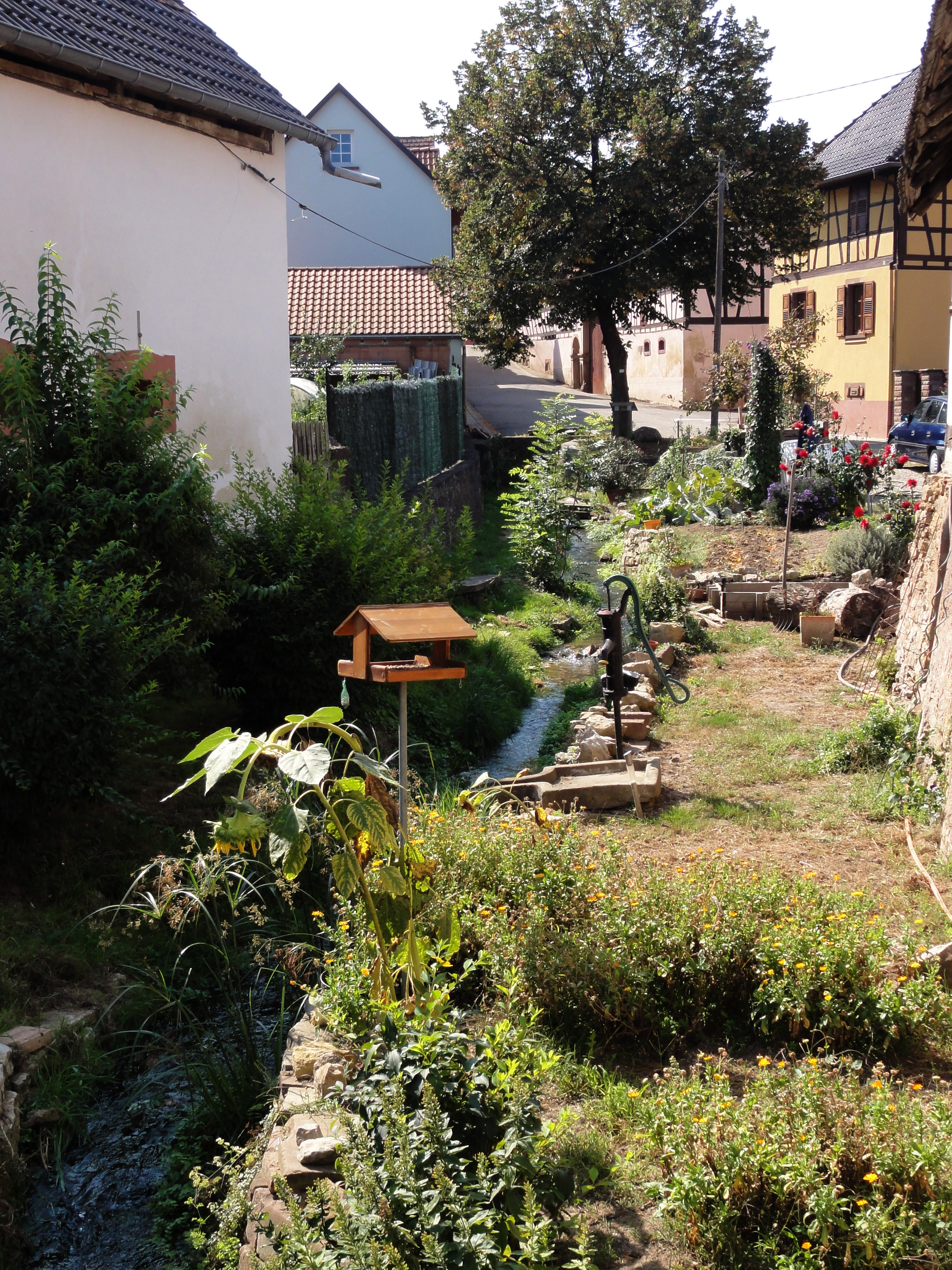

- Location within France Location within Grand Est

Location
- Country: France

Physical characteristics
- Source: Kuttolsheim
  - location: France
- Mouth: Confluence with River Ill
  - location: La Wantzenau, France
  - coordinates: 48°38′22″N 7°47′33″E
- Length: 25 km (16 mi)

Basin features
- Progression: Ill→ Rhine→ North Sea

The Souffel (German: Suffel) is a river in Alsace, France. It rises near Kuttolsheim and joins the river Ill (a tributary of the Rhine), south of La Wantzenau after a course of 25 kilometres (16 mi). It gave its name to two villages on its banks: Souffelweyersheim and Griesheim-sur-Souffel. Tributaries of the Souffel are Haltbach, Plaetzerbach, Musaubach, Kolbsenbach and Leisbach. In 1815 the Battle of La Suffel was fought on its banks.
