= Rohr, Bas-Rhin =

Rohr Ruur
- Commune
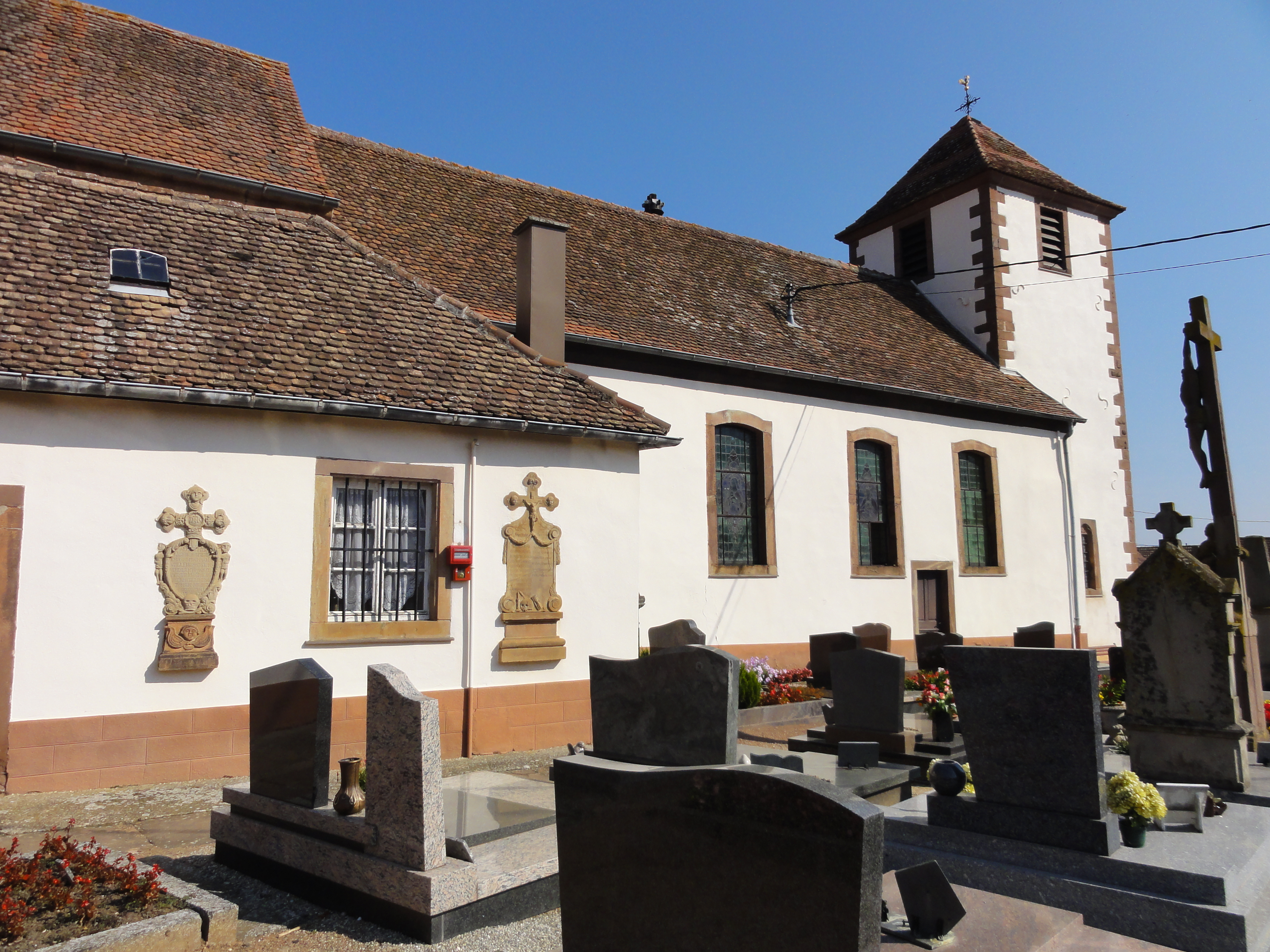
- The church in Rohr

- Coat of arms
- Location of Rohr
- Location within France Location within Grand Est
- Coordinates: 48°41′49″N 7°32′52″E
- Country: France
- Region: Grand Est
- Department: Bas-Rhin
- Arrondissement: Saverne
- Canton: Bouxwiller
- Intercommunality: CC Kochersberg

Government
  - Mayor (2020–2026): Jean-Luc Toussaint
- Area^{1}: 3.34 km^{2} (1.29 sq mi)
- Highest elevation: 239 m (784 ft)
- Lowest elevation: 175 m (574 ft)
- Population (2023): 377
  - Density: 113/km^{2} (292/sq mi)
- Time zone: UTC+01:00 (CET)
  - Summer (DST): UTC+02:00 (CEST)
- INSEE/Postal code: 67406 /67270
- ^{1} French Land Register data, which excludes lakes, ponds, glaciers > 1 km^{2} (0.386 sq mi or 247 acres) and river estuaries.

Rohr (French pronunciation: [ʁɔʁ]) is a commune in the Bas-Rhin department in Grand Est in north-eastern France.

Between 1 February 1973 and 1 January 1986 Rohr was merged with Gougenheim.

== See also ==
- Communes of the Bas-Rhin department
- Kochersberg
