= Dossenheim-Kochersberg =

- Commune
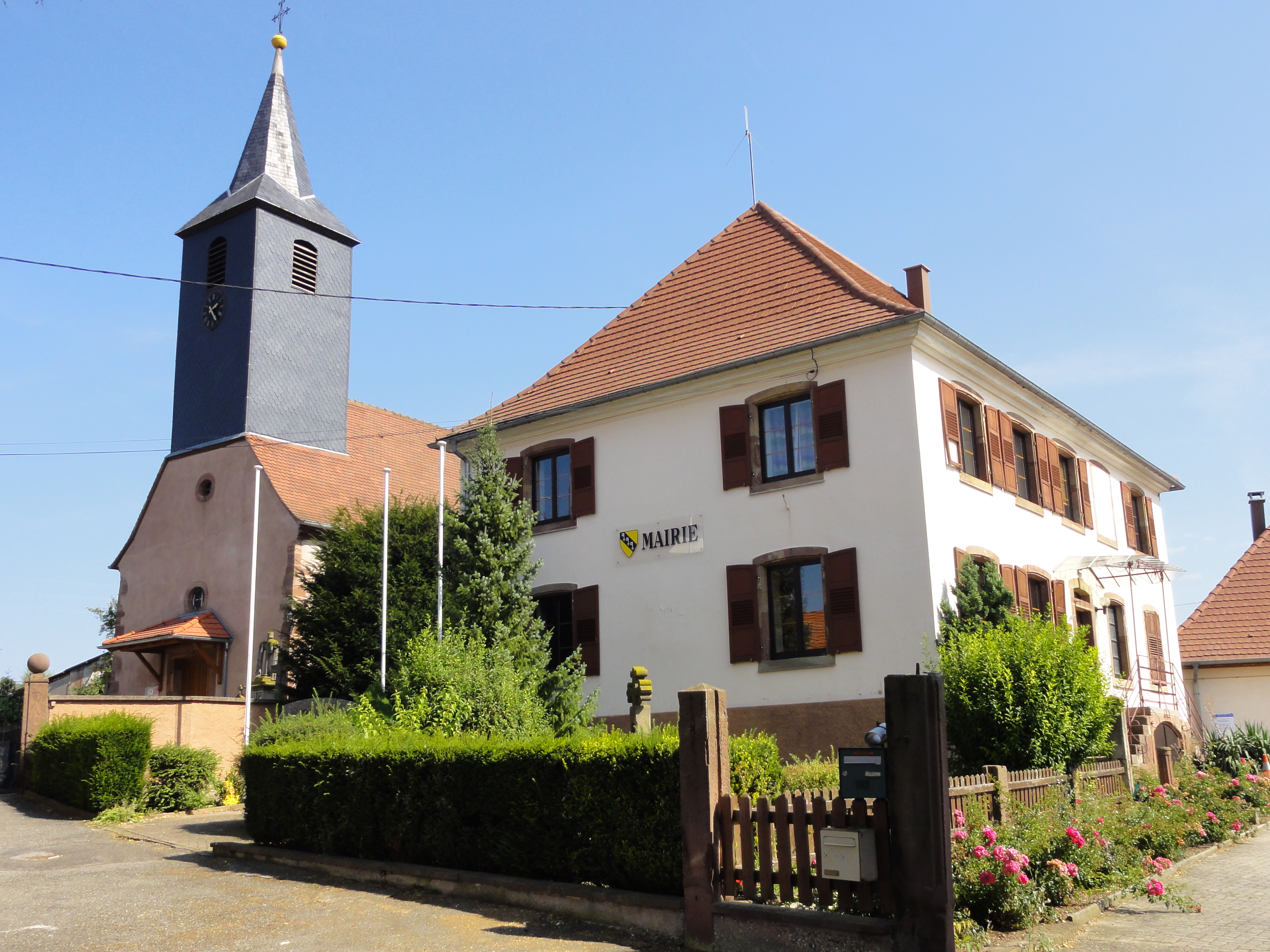
- The church and town hall in Dossenheim

- Coat of arms
- Location of Dossenheim-Kochersberg
- Location within France Location within Grand Est
- Coordinates: 48°38′20″N 7°34′27″E
- Country: France
- Region: Grand Est
- Department: Bas-Rhin
- Arrondissement: Saverne
- Canton: Bouxwiller
- Intercommunality: CC Kochersberg

Government
  - Mayor (2020–2026): Raymond Zilliox
- Area^{1}: 1.79 km^{2} (0.69 sq mi)
- Highest elevation: 194 m (636 ft)
- Lowest elevation: 161 m (528 ft)
- Population (2023): 322
  - Density: 180/km^{2} (466/sq mi)
- Time zone: UTC+01:00 (CET)
  - Summer (DST): UTC+02:00 (CEST)
- INSEE/Postal code: 67102 /67117
- ^{1} French Land Register data, which excludes lakes, ponds, glaciers > 1 km^{2} (0.386 sq mi or 247 acres) and river estuaries.

Dossenheim-Kochersberg is a commune in the Bas-Rhin department in Grand Est in north-eastern France.

== See also ==
- Communes of the Bas-Rhin department
- Kochersberg
