= Schnersheim =

- Commune
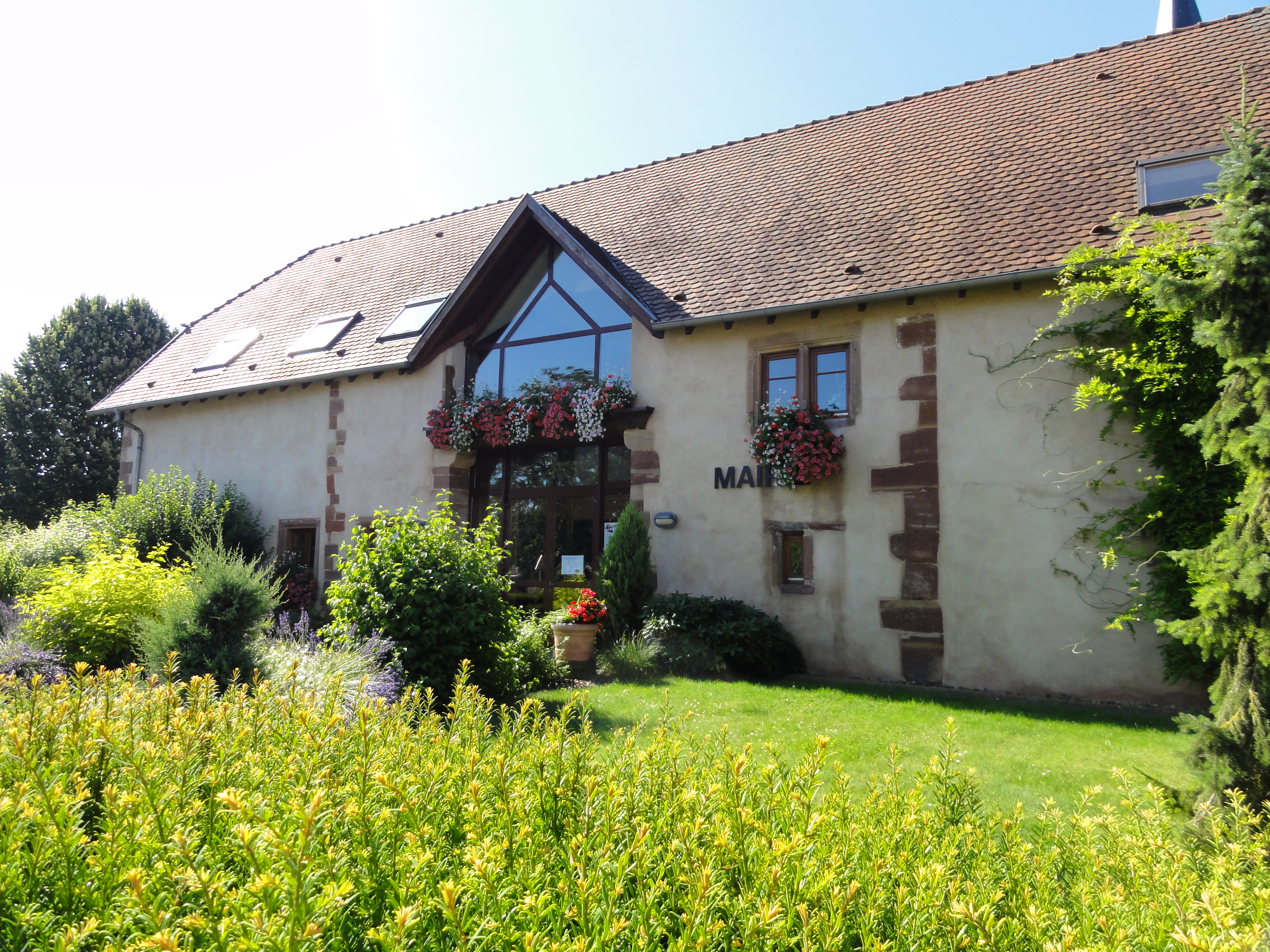
- The town hall in Schnersheim

- Coat of arms
- Location of Schnersheim
- Location within France Location within Grand Est
- Coordinates: 48°39′26″N 7°34′07″E
- Country: France
- Region: Grand Est
- Department: Bas-Rhin
- Arrondissement: Saverne
- Canton: Bouxwiller
- Intercommunality: CC Kochersberg

Government
  - Mayor (2020–2026): Denise Boehler
- Area^{1}: 10.82 km^{2} (4.18 sq mi)
- Highest elevation: 272 m (892 ft)
- Lowest elevation: 159 m (522 ft)
- Population (2023): 1,853
  - Density: 171.3/km^{2} (443.6/sq mi)
- Time zone: UTC+01:00 (CET)
  - Summer (DST): UTC+02:00 (CEST)
- INSEE/Postal code: 67452 /67370
- ^{1} French Land Register data, which excludes lakes, ponds, glaciers > 1 km^{2} (0.386 sq mi or 247 acres) and river estuaries.

Schnersheim (French pronunciation: [ʃnɛʁsaim]) is a commune in the Bas-Rhin department in Grand Est in north-eastern France.

On 1 May 1972, Schnersheim merged with the associated communes of Avenheim and Kleinfrankenheim.

== See also ==
- Communes of the Bas-Rhin department
- Kochersberg
