= Neugartheim-Ittlenheim =

- Commune
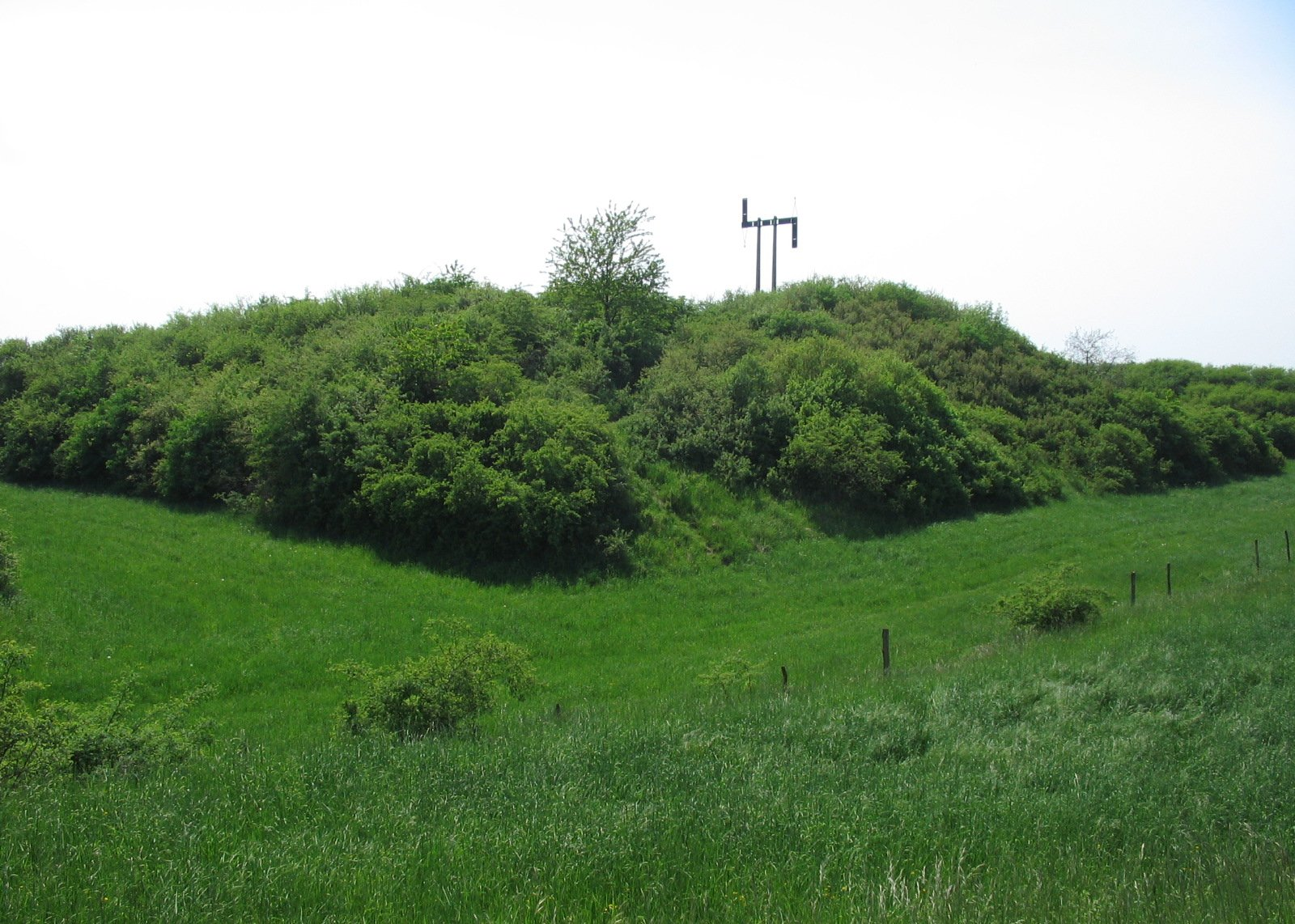
- View to the Kochersberg and the memorial

- Coat of arms
- Location of Neugartheim-Ittlenheim
- Location within France Location within Grand Est
- Coordinates: 48°39′19″N 7°32′46″E
- Country: France
- Region: Grand Est
- Department: Bas-Rhin
- Arrondissement: Saverne
- Canton: Bouxwiller
- Intercommunality: CC Kochersberg

Government
  - Mayor (2020–2026): Aurélie Dyeul
- Area^{1}: 4.06 km^{2} (1.57 sq mi)
- Highest elevation: 294 m (965 ft)
- Lowest elevation: 163 m (535 ft)
- Population (2023): 784
  - Density: 193/km^{2} (500/sq mi)
- Time zone: UTC+01:00 (CET)
  - Summer (DST): UTC+02:00 (CEST)
- INSEE/Postal code: 67228 /67370
- ^{1} French Land Register data, which excludes lakes, ponds, glaciers > 1 km^{2} (0.386 sq mi or 247 acres) and river estuaries.

Neugartheim-Ittlenheim is a commune in the Bas-Rhin department in Grand Est in north-eastern France. The commune was formed in January 1973 by the merger of the former communes Ittlenheim and Neugartheim.

On the top of the Kochersberg stood a castle built in the 13th century. It was destroyed in 1592 and only traces remain.

On its place was built between 1794 and 1797 a semaphore tower, the second nearest station from Strasbourg (after Dingsheim's one) on the semaphore line to Paris. It was used until 1852.

Since the late 20th century, a memorial replaced this tower. Consisting of a motionless reproduction of the arms of such a tower, it can still be seen (within clear weather) from over ten kilometres, making the Kochersberg hill easily recognizable.

== See also ==
- Communes of the Bas-Rhin department
