= Gougenheim =

- Commune
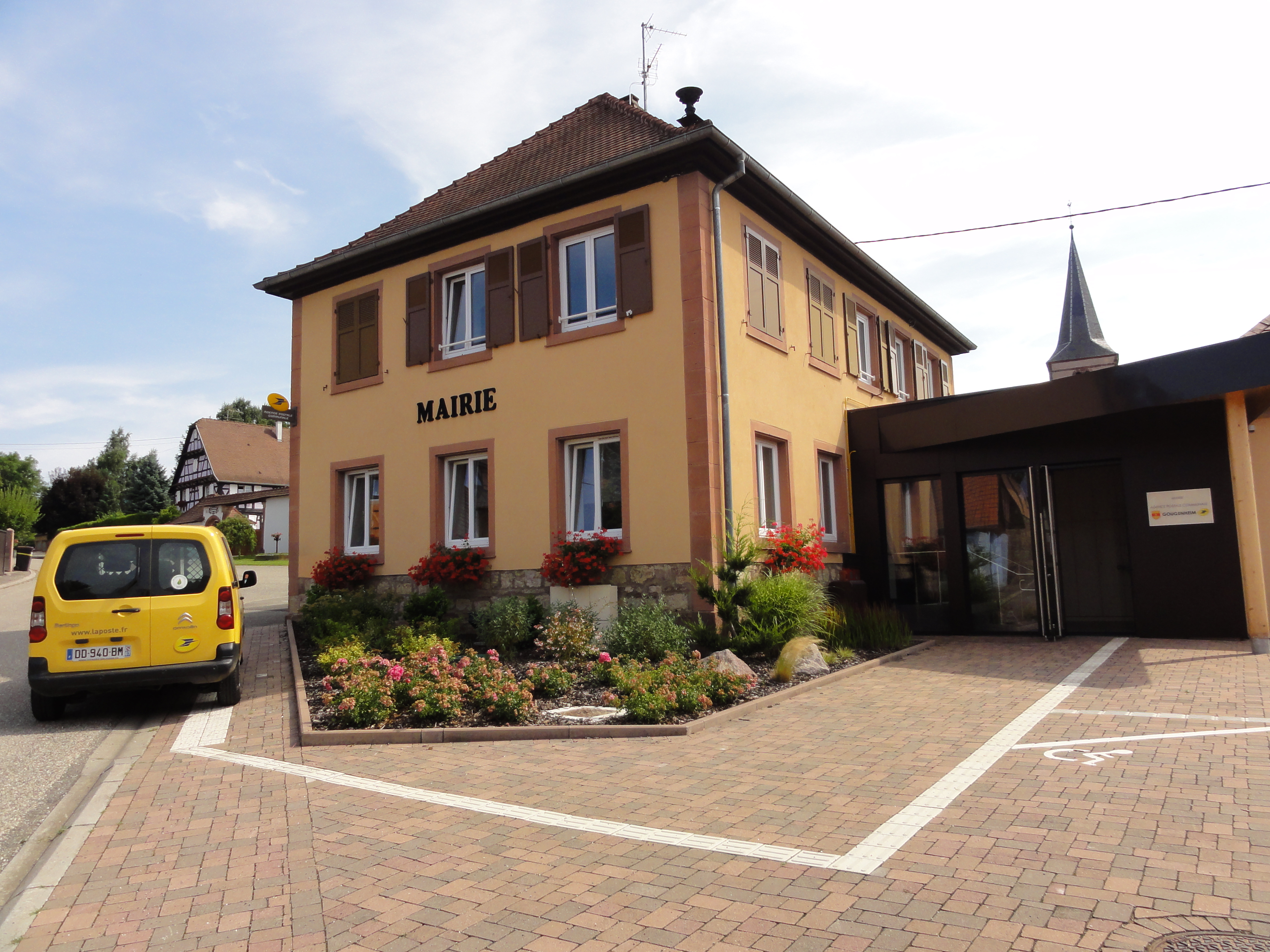
- The town hall in Gougenheim

- Coat of arms
- Location of Gougenheim
- Location within France Location within Grand Est
- Coordinates: 48°42′09″N 7°34′01″E
- Country: France
- Region: Grand Est
- Department: Bas-Rhin
- Arrondissement: Saverne
- Canton: Bouxwiller
- Intercommunality: CC Kochersberg

Government
  - Mayor (2020–2026): Laurent Krieger
- Area^{1}: 6.58 km^{2} (2.54 sq mi)
- Highest elevation: 287 m (942 ft)
- Lowest elevation: 172 m (564 ft)
- Population (2023): 531
  - Density: 80.7/km^{2} (209/sq mi)
- Time zone: UTC+01:00 (CET)
  - Summer (DST): UTC+02:00 (CEST)
- INSEE/Postal code: 67163 /67270
- ^{1} French Land Register data, which excludes lakes, ponds, glaciers > 1 km^{2} (0.386 sq mi or 247 acres) and river estuaries.

Gougenheim (French pronunciation: [ɡuɡənaim]; German: Gugenheim) is a commune in the Bas-Rhin department in Grand Est in north-eastern France. Between 1 February 1973 and 1 January 1986 Rohr was merged with Gougenheim. The Guggenheim family is named after Gougenheim.

== Location ==
The village lies on the departmental roads RD25 and RD31, between Rohr and Schaffhouse-sur-Zorn.

== Vanished castle ==
The bell tower of the parish church was formerly the dungeon of a castle which appears to have been built in the twelfth century and which disappeared probably in the late medieval period or as a result of the destructive wars of the seventeenth century.

Between 1147 and 1359 the castle was inhabited by the family of a senior functionary (famille de ministériels) employed by the Bishop of Strasbourg. In the thirteenth century five knights were assigned to defend the bishop's castle. By 1525 the castle was the seat of the bishops' bailiff, and in that year it played a role in suppressing the Peasants' Revolt, being the location chosen for an episcopal tribunal. It is believed that a gallows was erected, possibly at the spot called "Galgenberg" (German and Alsatian for "Gallows Hill"), on the high ground between Gougenheim and Mittelhausen.

== See also ==
- Communes of the Bas-Rhin department
- Kochersberg
