= Kienheim =

Kienheim Kiene
- Commune
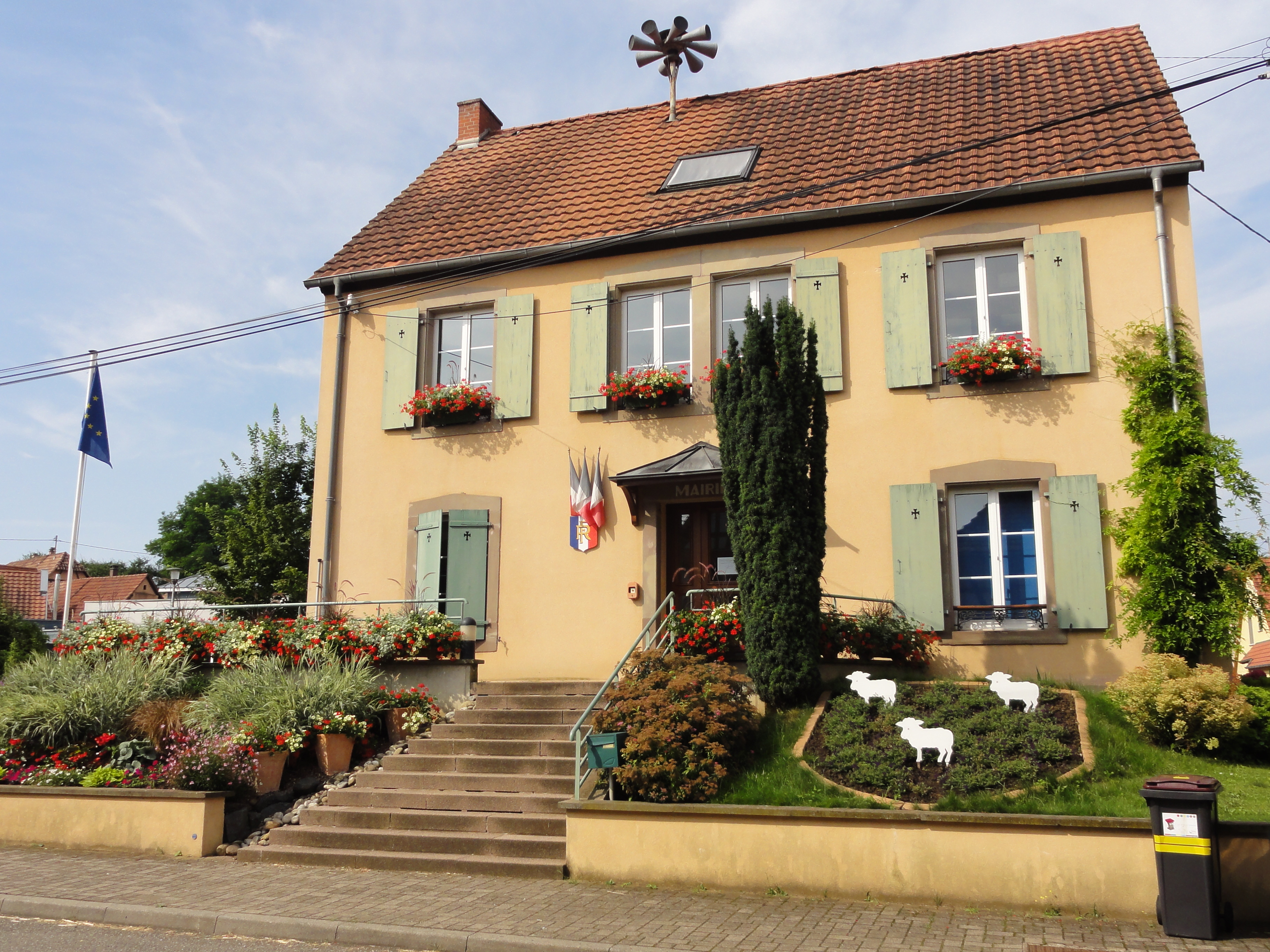
- The town hall in Kienheim

- Coat of arms
- Location of Kienheim
- Location within France Location within Grand Est
- Coordinates: 48°41′22″N 7°34′47″E
- Country: France
- Region: Grand Est
- Department: Bas-Rhin
- Arrondissement: Saverne
- Canton: Bouxwiller
- Intercommunality: CC Kochersberg

Government
  - Mayor (2020–2026): Luc Ginsz
- Area^{1}: 3.18 km^{2} (1.23 sq mi)
- Highest elevation: 275 m (902 ft)
- Lowest elevation: 184 m (604 ft)
- Population (2023): 537
  - Density: 169/km^{2} (437/sq mi)
- Time zone: UTC+01:00 (CET)
  - Summer (DST): UTC+02:00 (CEST)
- INSEE/Postal code: 67236 /67270
- ^{1} French Land Register data, which excludes lakes, ponds, glaciers > 1 km^{2} (0.386 sq mi or 247 acres) and river estuaries.

Kienheim (French pronunciation: [kinaim]) is a commune in the Bas-Rhin department in Grand Est in north-eastern France. It lies twenty kilometres (twelve miles) to the east-southeast of Saverne.

== See also ==
- Communes of the Bas-Rhin department
- Kochersberg
