= Fessenheim-le-Bas =

- Commune
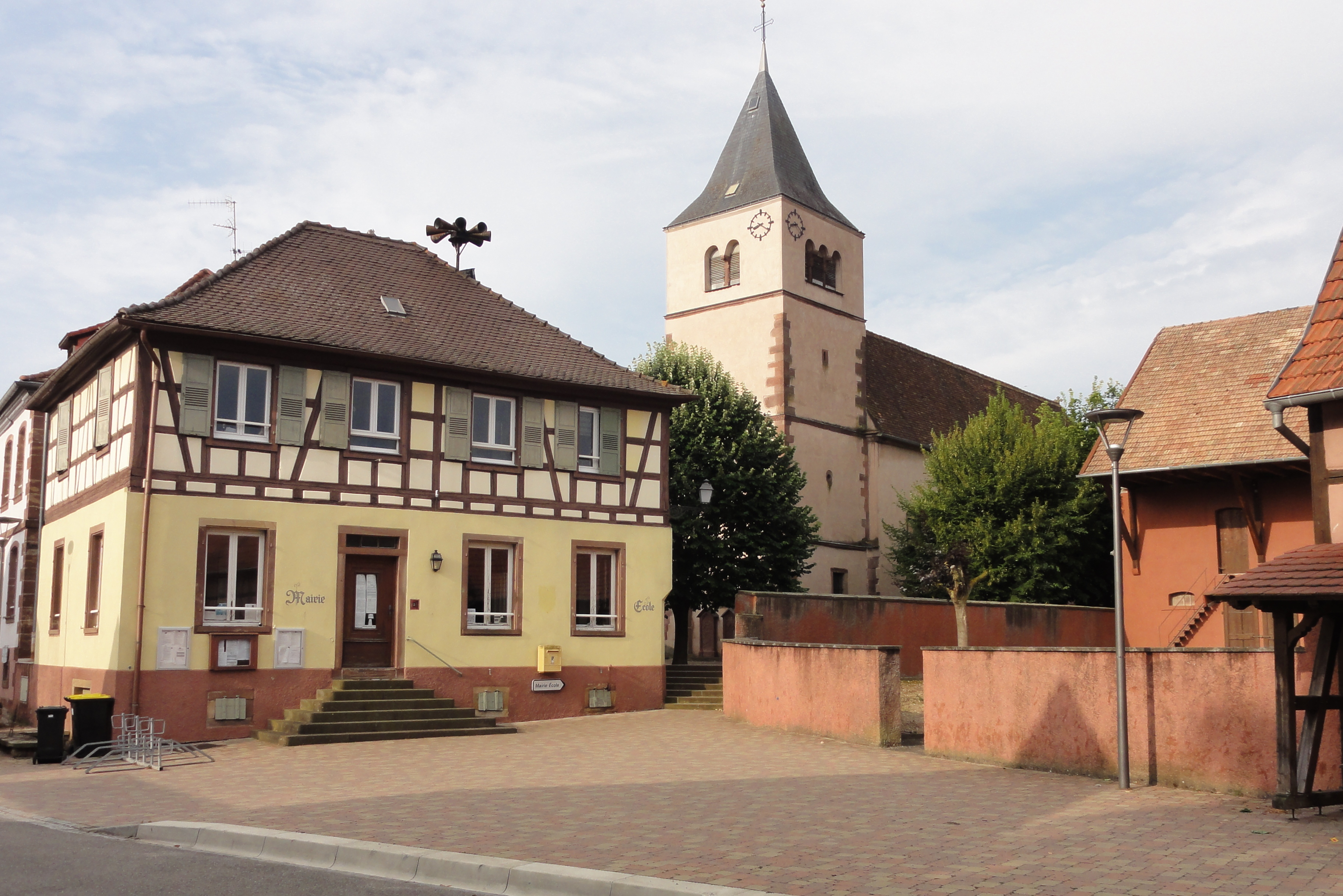
- The town hall and church in Fessenheim-le-Bas

- Coat of arms
- Location of Fessenheim-le-Bas
- Location within France Location within Grand Est
- Coordinates: 48°38′03″N 7°32′26″E
- Country: France
- Region: Grand Est
- Department: Bas-Rhin
- Arrondissement: Saverne
- Canton: Bouxwiller
- Intercommunality: CC Kochersberg

Government
  - Mayor (2020–2026): Pierre Luttmann
- Area^{1}: 4.95 km^{2} (1.91 sq mi)
- Highest elevation: 208 m (682 ft)
- Lowest elevation: 161 m (528 ft)
- Population (2023): 570
  - Density: 120/km^{2} (300/sq mi)
- Time zone: UTC+01:00 (CET)
  - Summer (DST): UTC+02:00 (CEST)
- INSEE/Postal code: 67138 /67117
- ^{1} French Land Register data, which excludes lakes, ponds, glaciers > 1 km^{2} (0.386 sq mi or 247 acres) and river estuaries.

Fessenheim-le-Bas (French pronunciation: [fɛsənaim lə ba]; German: Niederfessenheim) is a commune in the Bas-Rhin department in Grand Est in north-eastern France.

It has been built near an old Roman road leading from Strasbourg to Saverne.

== Notable people ==
- Aloyse Kobès (born at Fessenheim on 14 April 1820; died at Dakar on 11 October 1872) was the first missionary bishop from Alsace. Since 1972 a French school at Dakar has borne his name.

== Transport link ==
The town is served by Bus Route 205 of the Compagnie des Transports Strasbourgeois (CTS) inter-urban service.

== See also ==
- Fessenheim
- Communes of the Bas-Rhin department
- Kochersberg
