= Wiwersheim =

- Commune
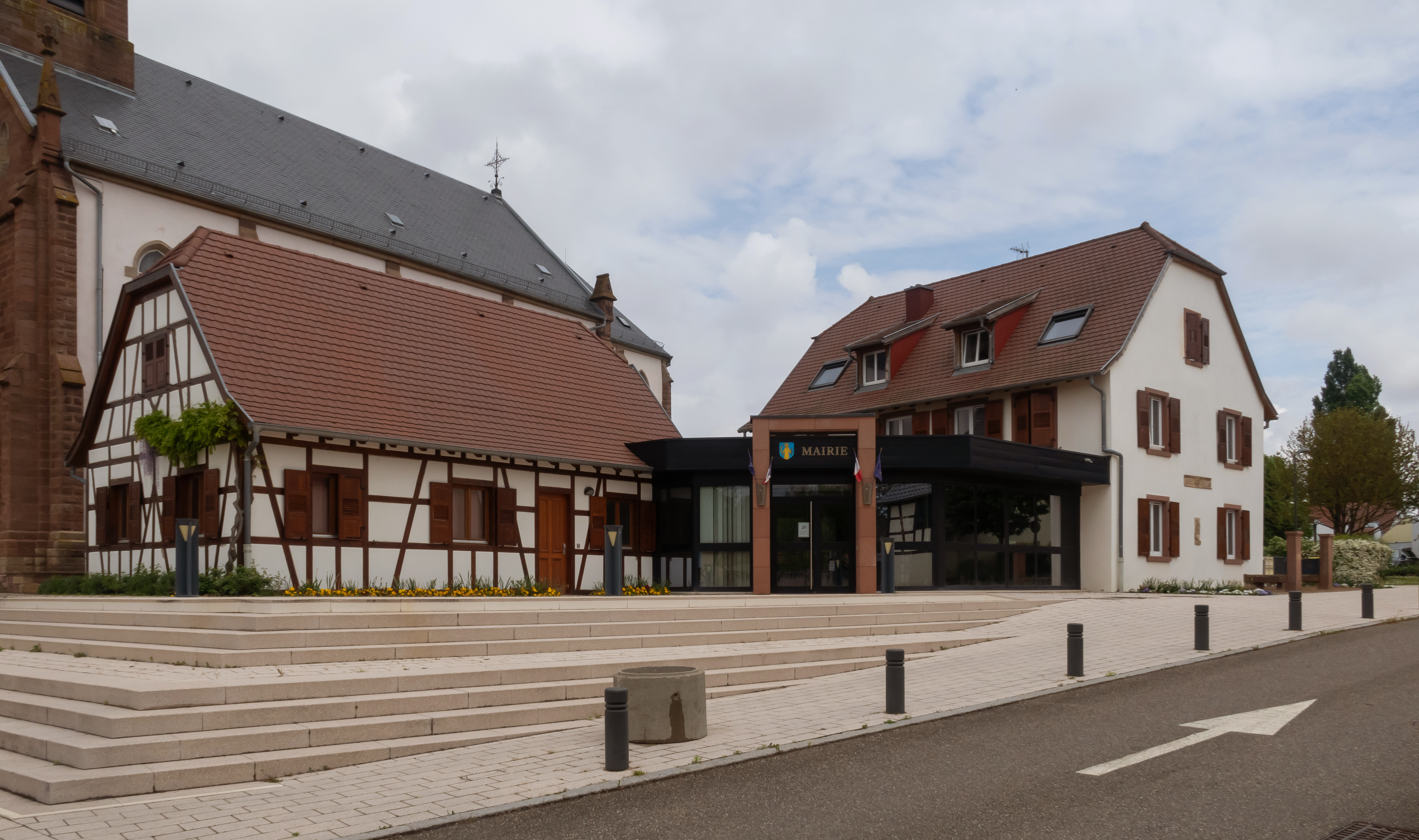
- Rathaus in Wiwersheim

- Coat of arms
- Location of Wiwersheim
- Location within France Location within Grand Est
- Coordinates: 48°38′28″N 7°36′26″E
- Country: France
- Region: Grand Est
- Department: Bas-Rhin
- Arrondissement: Saverne
- Canton: Bouxwiller
- Intercommunality: Kochersberg

Government
  - Mayor (2020–2026): Roland Michel
- Area^{1}: 3.29 km^{2} (1.27 sq mi)
- Elevation: 170 m (560 ft)
- Highest elevation: 183 m (600 ft)
- Lowest elevation: 153 m (502 ft)
- Population (2023): 922
  - Density: 280/km^{2} (726/sq mi)
- Time zone: UTC+01:00 (CET)
  - Summer (DST): UTC+02:00 (CEST)
- INSEE/Postal code: 67548 /67370
- ^{1} French Land Register data, which excludes lakes, ponds, glaciers > 1 km^{2} (0.386 sq mi or 247 acres) and river estuaries.

Wiwersheim is a commune in the Bas-Rhin department in Grand Est in north-eastern France.

On 23 November 1944, General Leclerc gathered his staff in the town hall of the village to finalize the last adjustments before the final 2nd Armored Division assault to liberate Strasbourg.

== Population ==
Historical population
Year	Pop.	±% p.a.
1968	262	—
1975	291	+1.51%
1982	345	+2.46%
1990	487	+4.40%
1999	502	+0.34%
2007	719	+4.59%
2012	860	+3.65%
2017	880	+0.46%
2023	922	+0.78%
Source: INSEE

== See also ==
- Communes of the Bas-Rhin department
- Kochersberg
