= Willgottheim =

- Commune
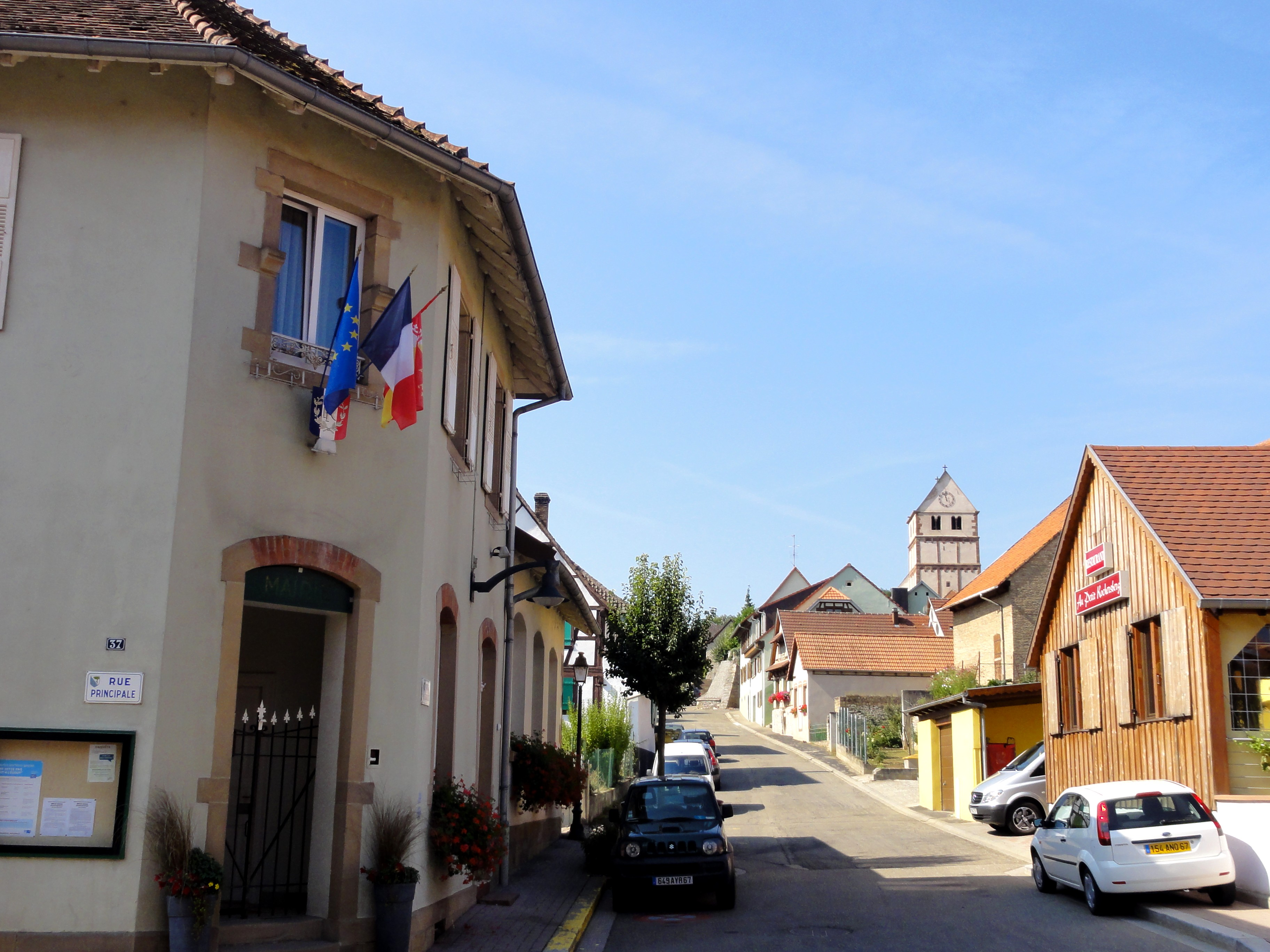
- The town hall and surroundings in Willgottheim

- Coat of arms
- Location of Willgottheim
- Location within France Location within Grand Est
- Coordinates: 48°40′18″N 7°30′39″E
- Country: France
- Region: Grand Est
- Department: Bas-Rhin
- Arrondissement: Saverne
- Canton: Bouxwiller
- Intercommunality: Kochersberg

Government
  - Mayor (2020–2026): Claudine Huckert
- Area^{1}: 9 km^{2} (3.5 sq mi)
- Highest elevation: 333 m (1,093 ft)
- Lowest elevation: 181 m (594 ft)
- Population (2023): 1,057
  - Density: 120/km^{2} (300/sq mi)
- Time zone: UTC+01:00 (CET)
  - Summer (DST): UTC+02:00 (CEST)
- INSEE/Postal code: 67532 /67370
- ^{1} French Land Register data, which excludes lakes, ponds, glaciers > 1 km^{2} (0.386 sq mi or 247 acres) and river estuaries.

Willgottheim (French pronunciation: [vilgɔtaim]) is a commune in the Bas-Rhin department in Grand Est in north-eastern France. Since 1 July 1972, Wœllenheim (German: Wöllenheim) is an associated commune of Willgottheim.

== Population ==
Historical population
Year	Pop.	±% p.a.
1968	622	—
1975	597	−0.58%
1982	633	+0.84%
1990	602	−0.63%
1999	914	+4.75%
2007	1,090	+2.23%
2012	1,085	−0.09%
2017	1,085	+0.00%
2023	1,057	−0.43%
Source: INSEE

== See also ==
- Communes of the Bas-Rhin department
- Kochersberg
