= Brice Conrad =

French singer

- Origin: Pfulgriesheim, France
- Genres: pop, rock, folk, French varieties
- Occupations: Singer, songwriter, musician
- Instruments: vocals, guitar
- Years active: 2012–present
- Labels: Universal Music, France
- Website: www.facebook.com/Briceconradmusic

Brice Conrad, born in Pfulgriesheim, France) is a French singer-songwriter and musician of pop rock and folk music and is signed to Universal Music France.

He became most famous for his songs "Fleur de mal" and "Oh la", both pre-releases from his forthcoming debut album La Nuit Bleue due on 4 March 2013. "Oh la" has charted in SNEP, the official French Singles Chart.

Conrad was born in a small village east of France and fell in love with music from a very young age. Starting to sing and write at age 17, he became famous through his online songs, after which he decided to move to Paris to follow a musical career, touring France including opening for Irma. After his debut "Fleur de mal", he was signed to the label Jo & Co/ Play on and eventually to Universal Music. His music is romantic, emotional and melodic, and he was nominated for "Talent Europe 1" for 2012 for upcoming artists, as well as "coup de coeur" at Virgin Radio and NRJ.

== Discography ==
=== Albums ===
Album and details	Year	Peak positions	Certification	Notes
Album and details	Year	FRA	Certification	Notes
La nuit bleue: Released: 4 March 2013; Record label: Universal Music France; Format:	2013	52		Track list: 1. "Oh la" 2. "Songe"; 3. "Fleur du mal" 4. "À la lumière 5. "La vie reste belle" 6. "L'Horizon"; 7. "Le Fonds des yeux" 8. "À quand les rêves" 9. "Les yeux saignent" 10. "Going Away"; 11. "Je m'en vais" 12. "Léa"

- 2013: (due on )

=== Singles ===
Year	Single	Peak positions	Album
Year	Single	FRA	Album
2012	"Fleur du mal"	–	La Nuit bleue
2012	"Oh la"	15	La Nuit bleue
2013	"Songe"	135	La Nuit bleue
2013	"Léa"	104	La Nuit bleue
2015	"À tort ou à raison"	124	

== Awards and nominations ==
Year	Award	Nominee	Result
2013	Révélation francophone	NRJ Music Awards	Pending
