= Kuttolsheim =

Kuttolsheim Kíttelse
- Commune
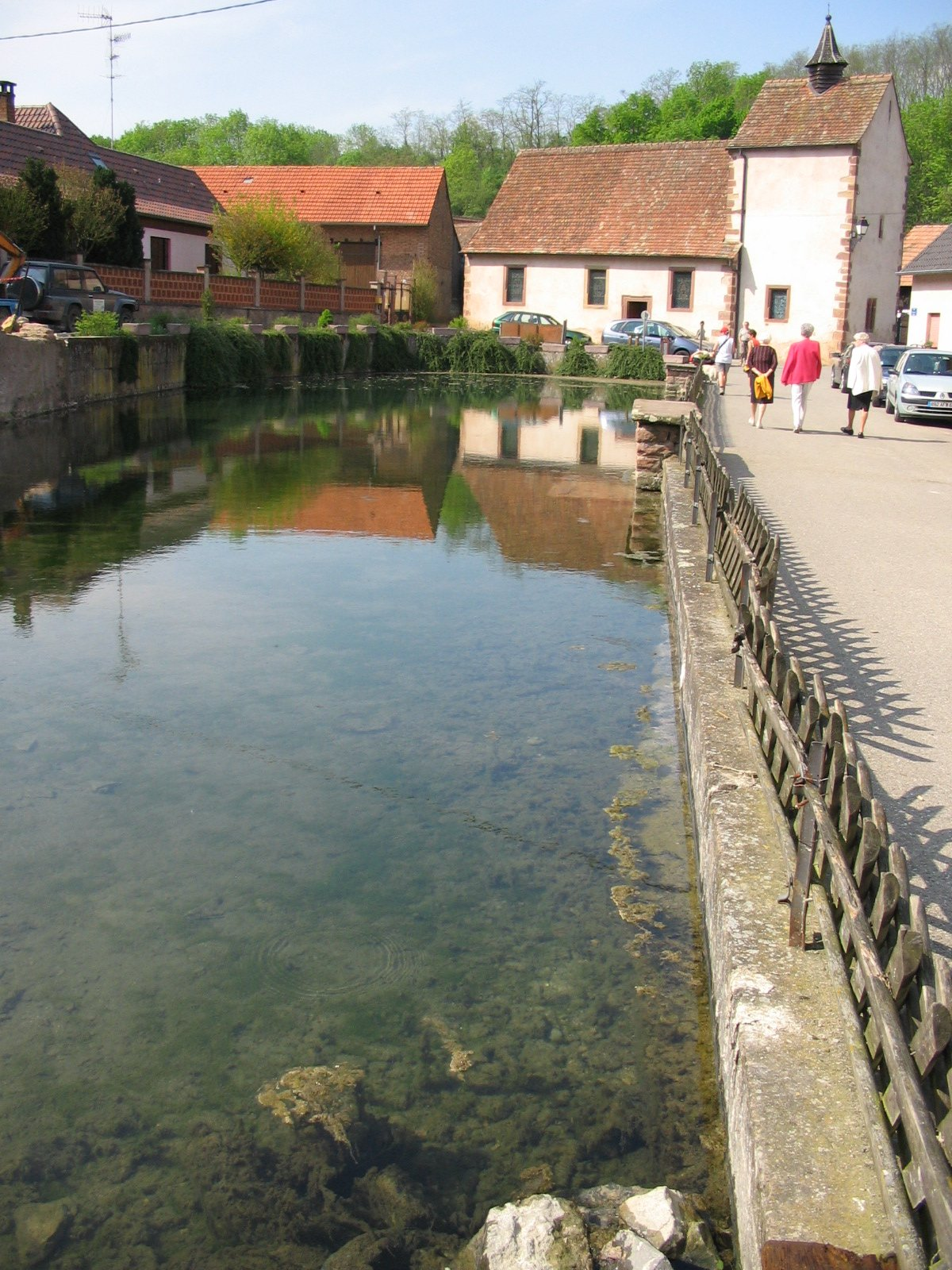
- Sainte-Barbe chapel and Schwefelsee

- Coat of arms
- Location of Kuttolsheim
- Location within France Location within Grand Est
- Coordinates: 48°38′38″N 7°31′30″E
- Country: France
- Region: Grand Est
- Department: Bas-Rhin
- Arrondissement: Saverne
- Canton: Bouxwiller
- Intercommunality: CC Kochersberg

Government
  - Mayor (2020–2026): Vincent Noe
- Area^{1}: 4.59 km^{2} (1.77 sq mi)
- Highest elevation: 365 m (1,198 ft)
- Lowest elevation: 166 m (545 ft)
- Population (2023): 651
  - Density: 142/km^{2} (367/sq mi)
- Time zone: UTC+01:00 (CET)
  - Summer (DST): UTC+02:00 (CEST)
- INSEE/Postal code: 67253 /67520
- ^{1} French Land Register data, which excludes lakes, ponds, glaciers > 1 km^{2} (0.386 sq mi or 247 acres) and river estuaries.

Kuttolsheim (French pronunciation: [kytɔlsaim]; German: Küttolsheim; Alsatian: Kettelse) is a commune in the Bas-Rhin department in Grand Est in north-eastern France.

It has been built along an old Roman road leading from Strasbourg to Saverne.

== Geography ==
Saverne is approximately twelve kilometres (seven miles) to the north-west while Strasbourg is approximately twenty-five kilometres (fifteen miles) to the east. The twentieth century route nationale 4 connecting the two avoids Kuttolsheim but passes through Marlenheim, a short distance to the south.

== Landmarks ==
- Sainte-Barbe chapel: classified as a historic monument; the tower has been built in the 13th century near a sultry spring, probably on the place of an elder sanctuary. The nave dates from the seventeenth century.
- Schwefelsee (sulfur lake): known since the Roman era, its water was then piped to Strasbourg. The lake is a small natural water retain at the outlet of the Souffel's spring. The spring's rate of flow reaches 17 litres per second, its temperature is constant (about 12-13 °C) and therefore the lake never freezes. The sulfur content of the water allowed it to be used since the Roman era until the 1950s in thermae : its curative properties were mostly used to cure skin diseases. The lake also served as a horse bath (als: Rosschwemm) : a mild slope allows them to quietly go into water.
- Saint-Jacques-le-majeur church: the choir tower, built by the architect Bernach in the 12th century, is classified as a historic monument. The present choir and nave have been rebuilt in 1865 after a fire.
- Buddhist temple: Since 1978, Kuttolsheim is one of the four places in Alsace where a Buddhist centre can be found. Since it is the European Institute of Tibetan Buddhism, the Dalai Lama went there many times.

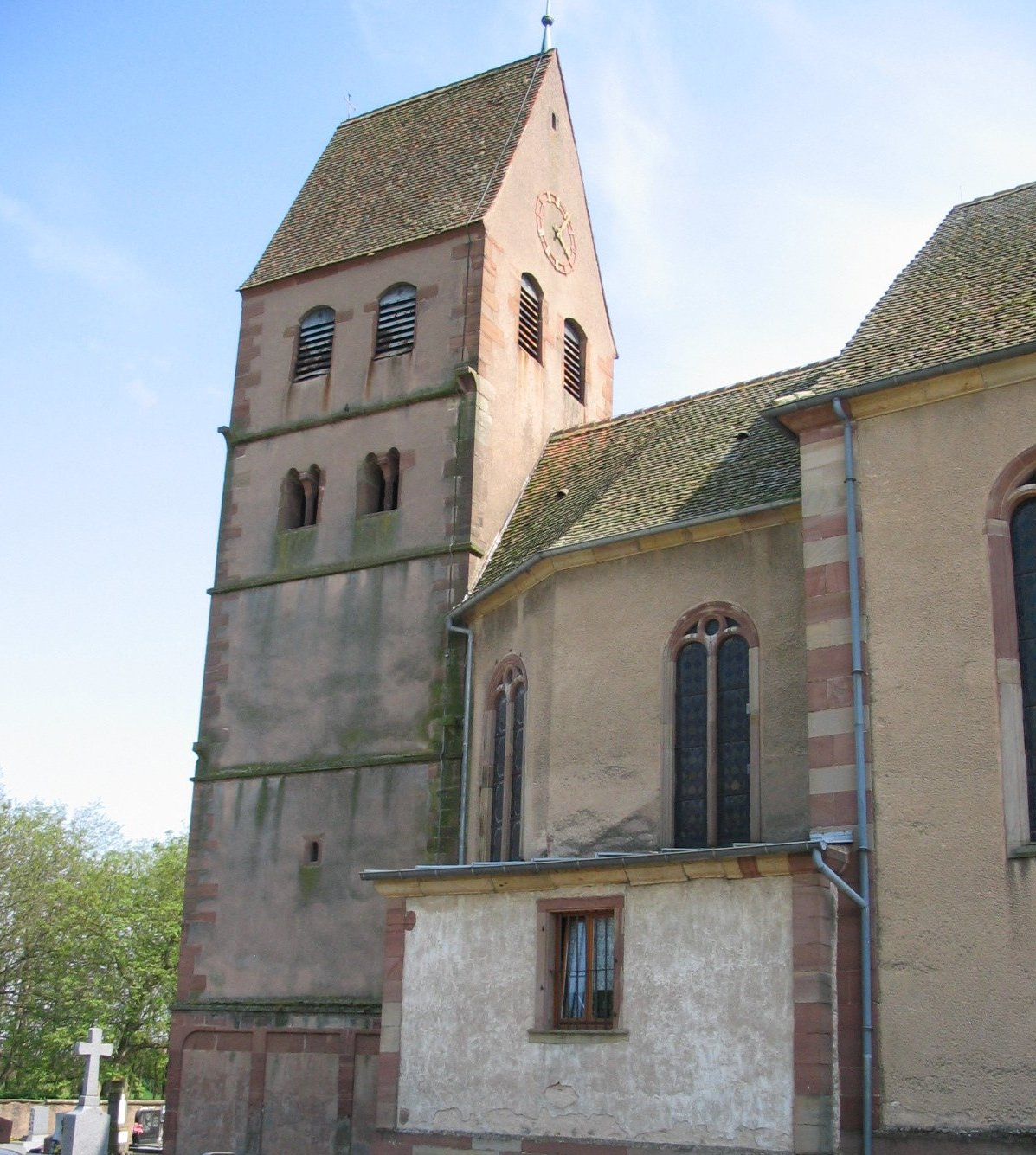
Saint-Jacques-le-majeur church

== See also ==
- Communes of the Bas-Rhin department
- Kochersberg
