= Durningen =

Durningen Dírnínge
- Commune
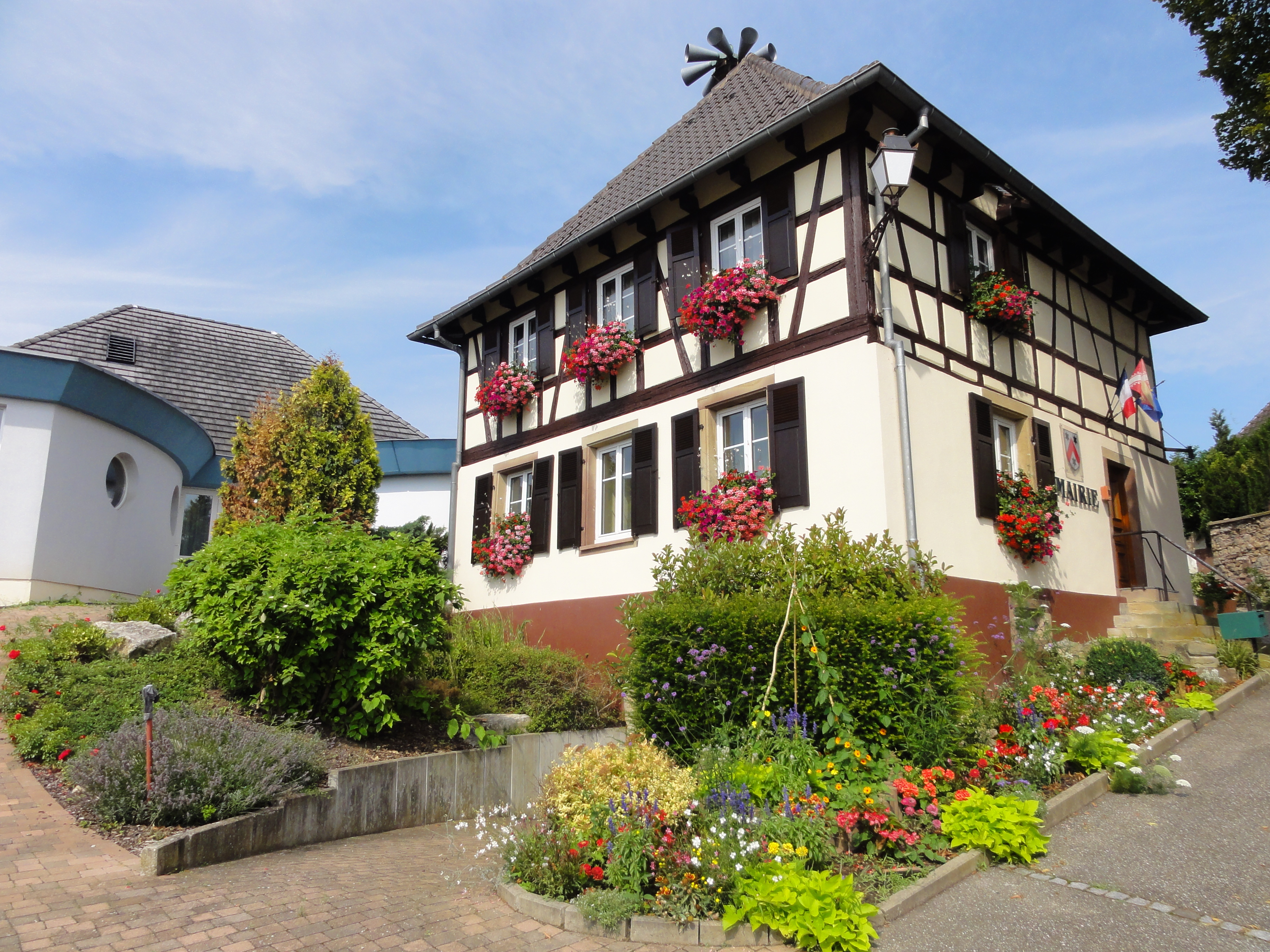
- The town hall in Durningen

- Coat of arms
- Location of Durningen
- Location within France Location within Grand Est
- Coordinates: 48°41′02″N 7°34′05″E
- Country: France
- Region: Grand Est
- Department: Bas-Rhin
- Arrondissement: Saverne
- Canton: Bouxwiller
- Intercommunality: CC Kochersberg

Government
  - Mayor (2020–2026): Christine Blanchais
- Area^{1}: 4.02 km^{2} (1.55 sq mi)
- Highest elevation: 274 m (899 ft)
- Lowest elevation: 179 m (587 ft)
- Population (2023): 687
  - Density: 171/km^{2} (443/sq mi)
- Time zone: UTC+01:00 (CET)
  - Summer (DST): UTC+02:00 (CEST)
- INSEE/Postal code: 67109 /67270
- ^{1} French Land Register data, which excludes lakes, ponds, glaciers > 1 km^{2} (0.386 sq mi or 247 acres) and river estuaries.

Durningen (French pronunciation: [dyʁniŋ(ɡ)ən]; Dürningen in German; Dírnínge in Alsatian) is a commune in the Bas-Rhin department and Grand Est region of north-eastern France.

It is the highest-situated commune in the Kochersberg natural region.

The name is first recorded in 724 as Deorangus, subsequently as Teuringas (742), Thurinca (787), Thuringen (1276), and finally Turningen / Durningen (1371).

In the Middle Ages, Durningen was part of the domain of Hanau-Lichtenberg and belonged to the Prince-Bishopric of Strasbourg.

== See also ==
- Communes of the Bas-Rhin department
