= Stutzheim-Offenheim =

- Commune
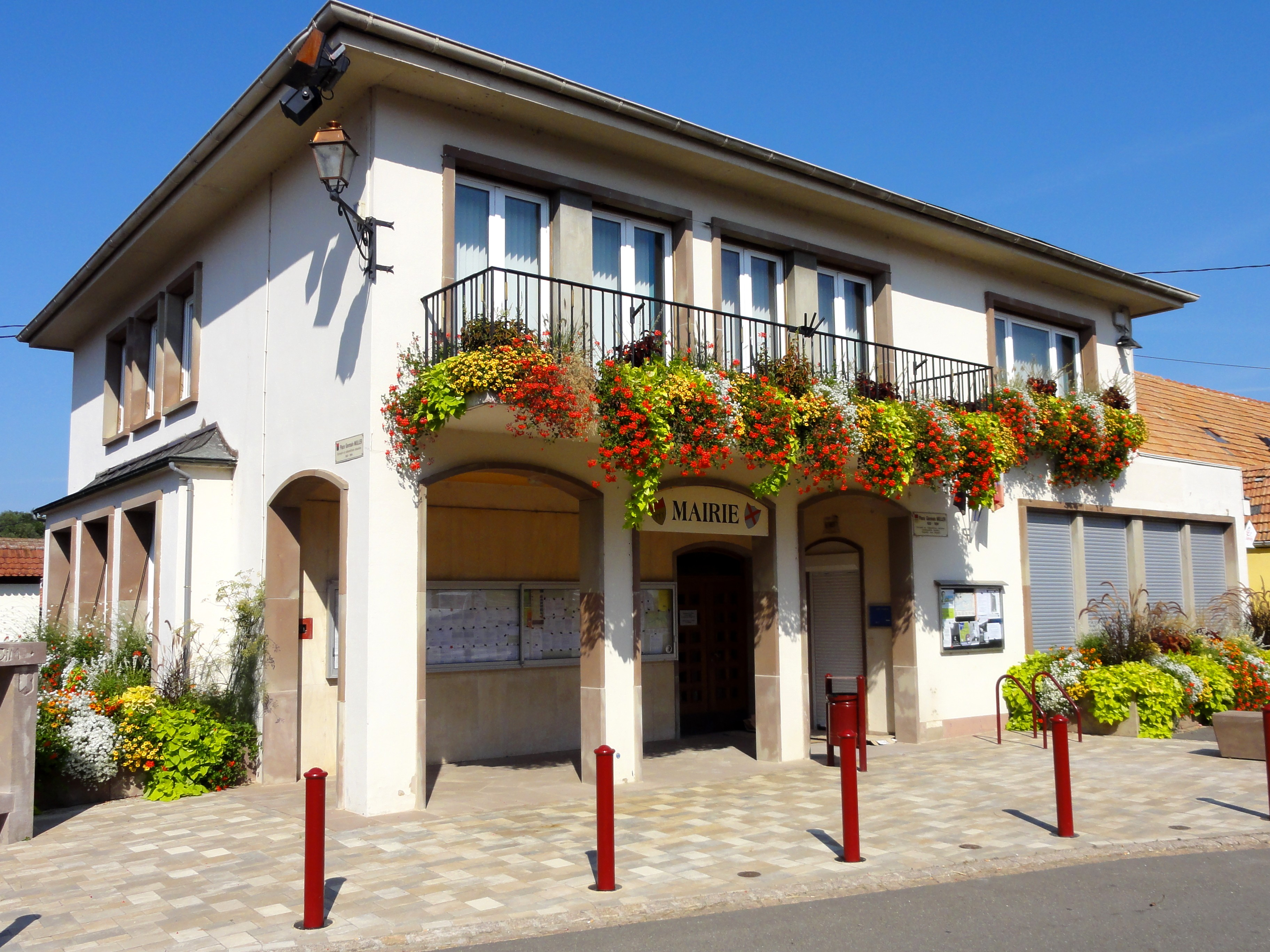
- The town hall in Stutzheim

- Coat of arms
- Location of Stutzheim-Offenheim
- Location within France Location within Grand Est
- Coordinates: 48°37′53″N 7°37′10″E
- Country: France
- Region: Grand Est
- Department: Bas-Rhin
- Arrondissement: Saverne
- Canton: Bouxwiller
- Intercommunality: CC Kochersberg

Government
  - Mayor (2020–2026): Jean-Charles Lambert
- Area^{1}: 7.14 km^{2} (2.76 sq mi)
- Highest elevation: 181 m (594 ft)
- Lowest elevation: 150 m (490 ft)
- Population (2023): 1,607
  - Density: 225/km^{2} (583/sq mi)
- Time zone: UTC+01:00 (CET)
  - Summer (DST): UTC+02:00 (CEST)
- INSEE/Postal code: 67485 /67370
- ^{1} French Land Register data, which excludes lakes, ponds, glaciers > 1 km^{2} (0.386 sq mi or 247 acres) and river estuaries.

Stutzheim-Offenheim (French pronunciation: [ʃtytsaim ɔfənaim]; German: Stützheim-Offenheim) is a commune in the Bas-Rhin department in Grand Est in north-eastern France.

On 1 May 1972, Stutzheim-Offenheim was created as a fusion of Stutzheim and Offenheim.

== Landmarks ==
The church, Église Saint-Arbogast d'Offenheim, is a local registered Monument historique.

== See also ==
- Communes of the Bas-Rhin department
- Kochersberg
