= Wintzenheim-Kochersberg =

- Commune
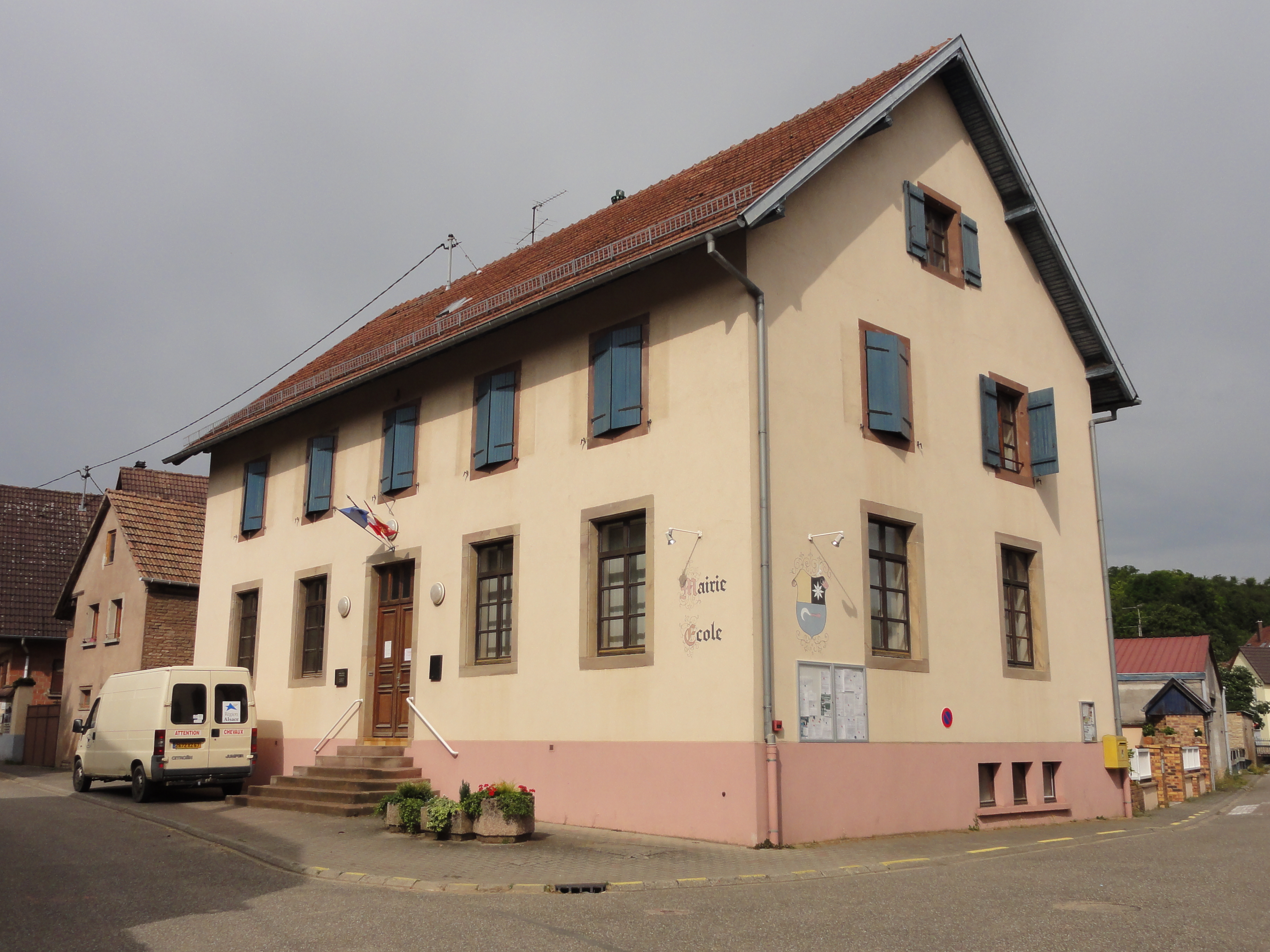
- The town hall in Wintzenheim-Kochersberg

- Coat of arms
- Location of Wintzenheim-Kochersberg
- Location within France Location within Grand Est
- Coordinates: 48°39′34″N 7°30′47″E
- Country: France
- Region: Grand Est
- Department: Bas-Rhin
- Arrondissement: Saverne
- Canton: Bouxwiller
- Intercommunality: Kochersberg

Government
  - Mayor (2020–2026): Alain North
- Area^{1}: 1.95 km^{2} (0.75 sq mi)
- Elevation: 250 m (820 ft)
- Highest elevation: 343 m (1,125 ft)
- Lowest elevation: 210 m (690 ft)
- Population (2023): 532
  - Density: 273/km^{2} (707/sq mi)
- Time zone: UTC+01:00 (CET)
  - Summer (DST): UTC+02:00 (CEST)
- INSEE/Postal code: 67542 /67370
- ^{1} French Land Register data, which excludes lakes, ponds, glaciers > 1 km^{2} (0.386 sq mi or 247 acres) and river estuaries.

Wintzenheim-Kochersberg (German: Winzenheim-Kochersberg) is a commune in the Bas-Rhin department in Grand Est in north-eastern France.

== Population ==
Historical population
| Year | Pop. | ±% p.a. |
|---|---|---|
| 1968 | 225 | — |
| 1975 | 258 | +1.97% |
| 1982 | 252 | −0.34% |
| 1990 | 269 | +0.82% |
| 1999 | 269 | +0.00% |
| 2007 | 289 | +0.90% |
| 2012 | 341 | +3.36% |
| 2017 | 425 | +4.50% |
| 2023 | 532 | +3.81% |
Source: INSEE

== See also ==
- Communes of the Bas-Rhin department
- Kochersberg
