= Berstett =

Berstett Barstett
- Commune
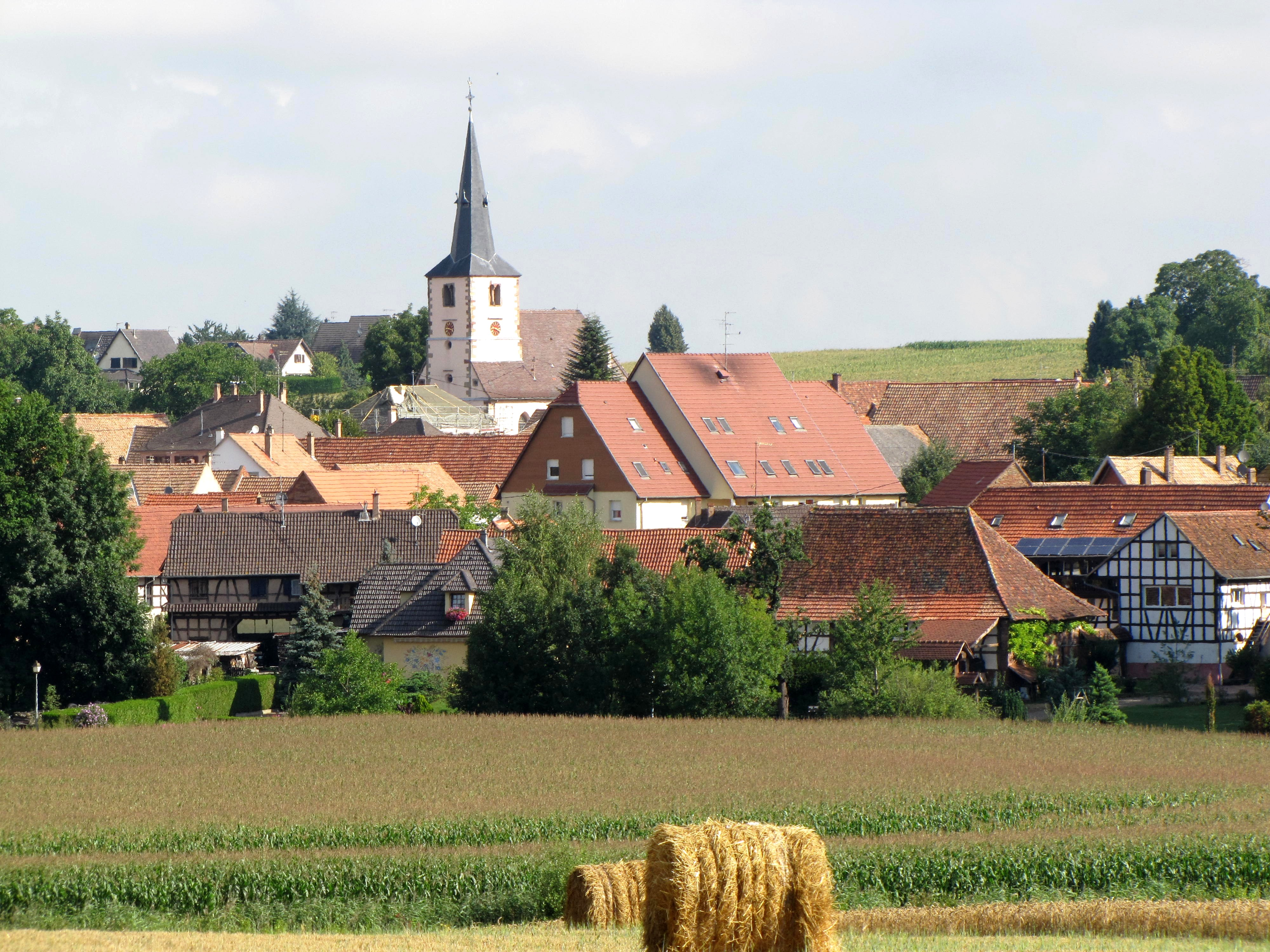
- A general view of Berstett

- Coat of arms
- Location of Berstett
- Location within France Location within Grand Est
- Coordinates: 48°40′48″N 7°39′31″E
- Country: France
- Region: Grand Est
- Department: Bas-Rhin
- Arrondissement: Saverne
- Canton: Bouxwiller
- Intercommunality: CC Kochersberg

Government
  - Mayor (2020–2026): Jean-Claude Lasthaus
- Area^{1}: 17.88 km^{2} (6.90 sq mi)
- Highest elevation: 281 m (922 ft)
- Lowest elevation: 147 m (482 ft)
- Population (2023): 2,517
  - Density: 140.8/km^{2} (364.6/sq mi)
- Time zone: UTC+01:00 (CET)
  - Summer (DST): UTC+02:00 (CEST)
- INSEE/Postal code: 67034 /67370
- ^{1} French Land Register data, which excludes lakes, ponds, glaciers > 1 km^{2} (0.386 sq mi or 247 acres) and river estuaries.

Berstett is a commune in the Bas-Rhin department in Grand Est in northeastern France.

In 1972, the communes of Berstett, Gimbrett, Reitwiller (German: Reitweiler) and Rumersheim were merged into the present commune.

== Population ==
Historical population
Year	Pop.	±% p.a.
1968	1,265	—
1975	1,274	+0.10%
1982	1,527	+2.62%
1990	1,679	+1.19%
1999	1,919	+1.50%
2007	2,131	+1.32%
2012	2,347	+1.95%
2017	2,437	+0.76%
2023	2,517	+0.54%
Source: INSEE

== See also ==
- Communes of the Bas-Rhin department
- Kochersberg
