= Église Saint-Arbogast d'Offenheim =

Church in Bas-Rhin, France

Coordinates: 48°37′54″N 7°37′0″E

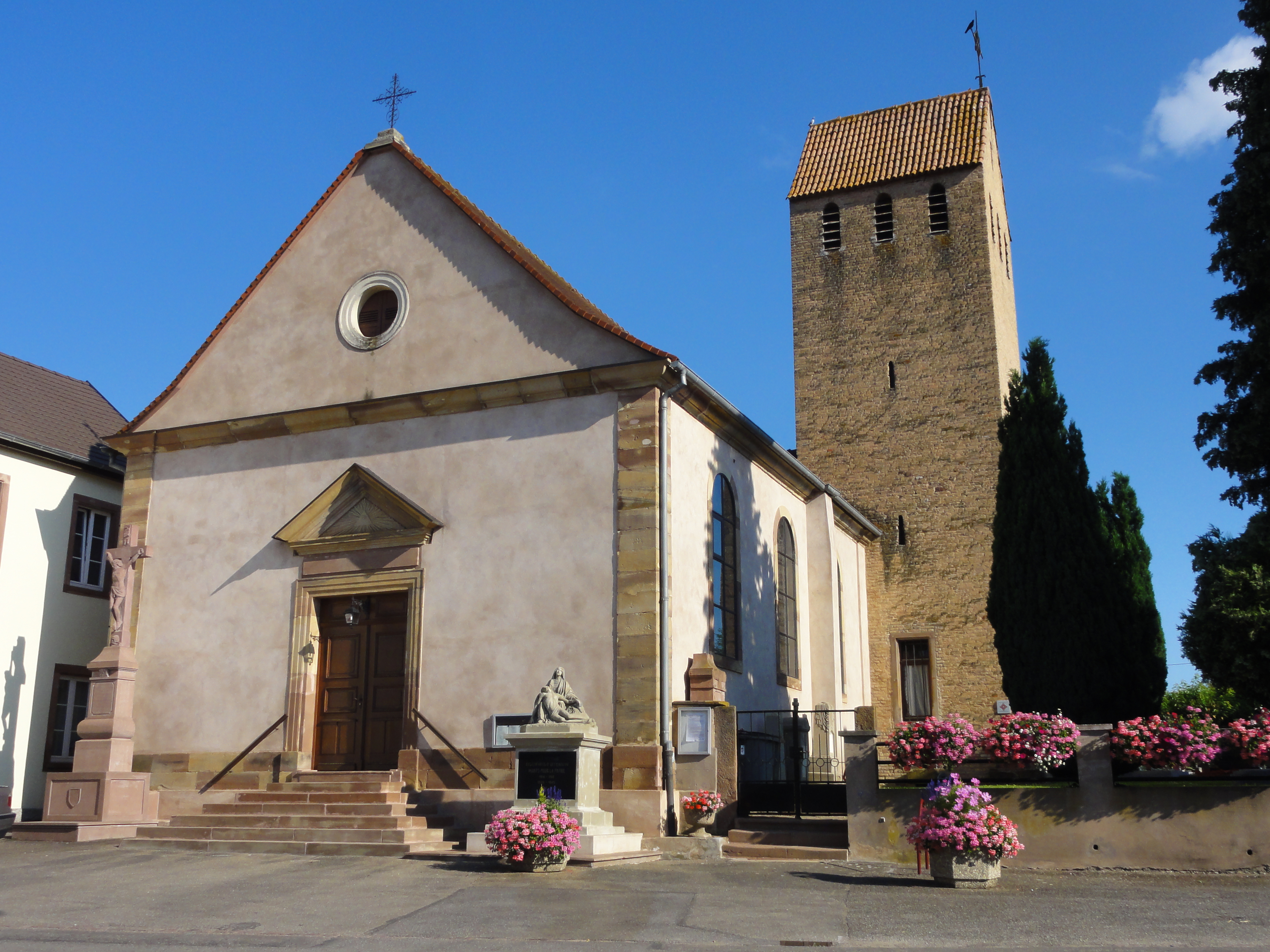
Église Saint-Arbogast d'Offenheim

Église Saint-Arbogast d'Offenheim is a church in Stutzheim-Offenheim, Bas-Rhin, Alsace, France. Dated to the 12th century, it became a registered Monument historique in 1898.
