= Furdenheim =

Furdenheim Fírne
- Commune
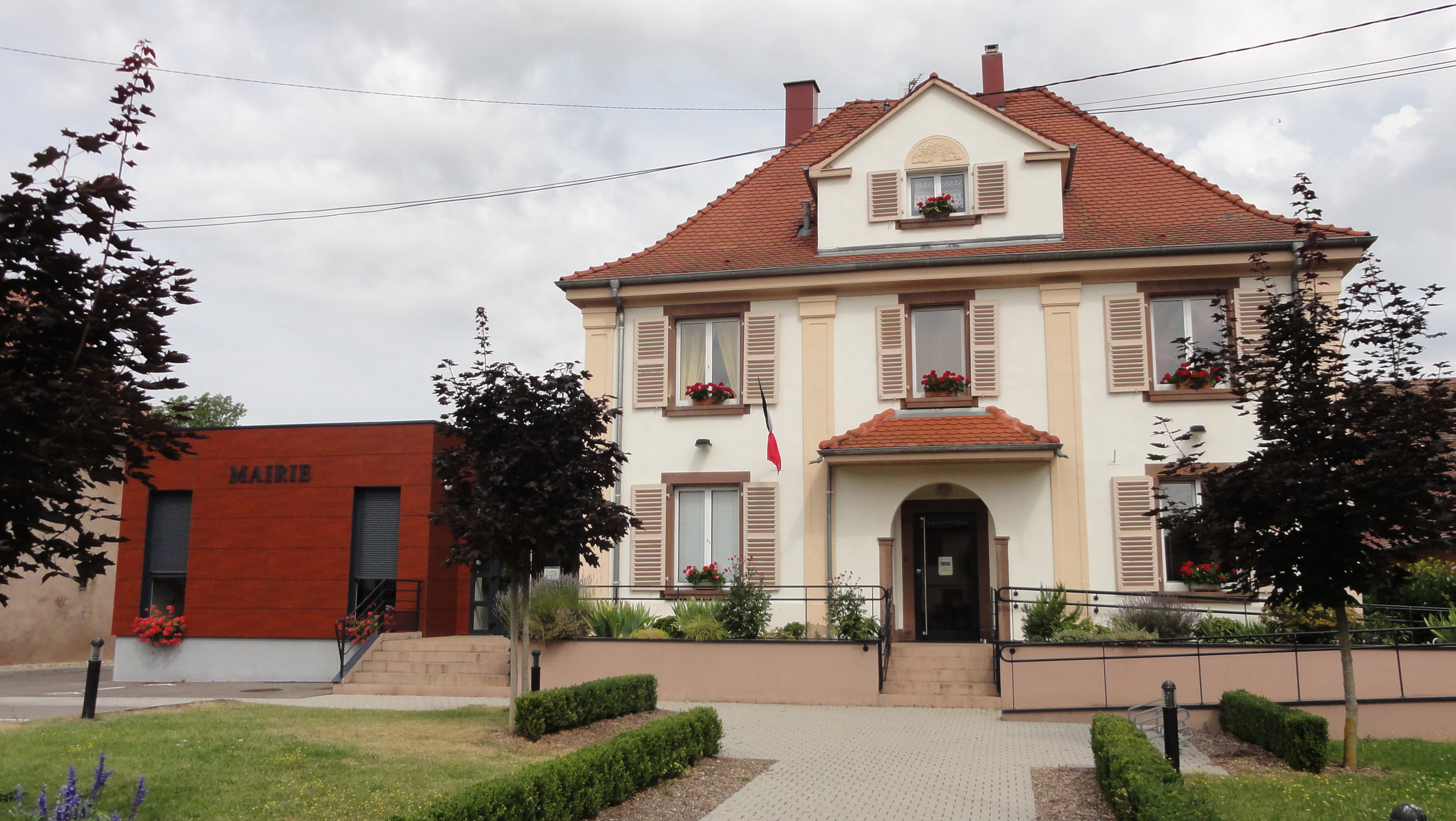
- The town hall in Furdenheim

- Coat of arms
- Location of Furdenheim
- Location within France Location within Grand Est
- Coordinates: 48°36′45″N 7°33′42″E
- Country: France
- Region: Grand Est
- Department: Bas-Rhin
- Arrondissement: Saverne
- Canton: Bouxwiller
- Intercommunality: CC Kochersberg

Government
  - Mayor (2025–2026): Jacques Wurtz
- Area^{1}: 5.81 km^{2} (2.24 sq mi)
- Elevation: 180 m (590 ft)
- Highest elevation: 225 m (738 ft)
- Lowest elevation: 167 m (548 ft)
- Population (2023): 1,620
  - Density: 279/km^{2} (722/sq mi)
- Time zone: UTC+01:00 (CET)
  - Summer (DST): UTC+02:00 (CEST)
- INSEE/Postal code: 67150 /67117
- ^{1} French Land Register data, which excludes lakes, ponds, glaciers > 1 km^{2} (0.386 sq mi or 247 acres) and river estuaries.

Furdenheim (French pronunciation: [fyʁdənaim]; German: Fürdenheim; Alsatian: Firne) is a commune in the Bas-Rhin department in Grand Est in north-eastern France.

== See also ==
- Communes of the Bas-Rhin department
- Kochersberg
