= Quatzenheim =

- Commune
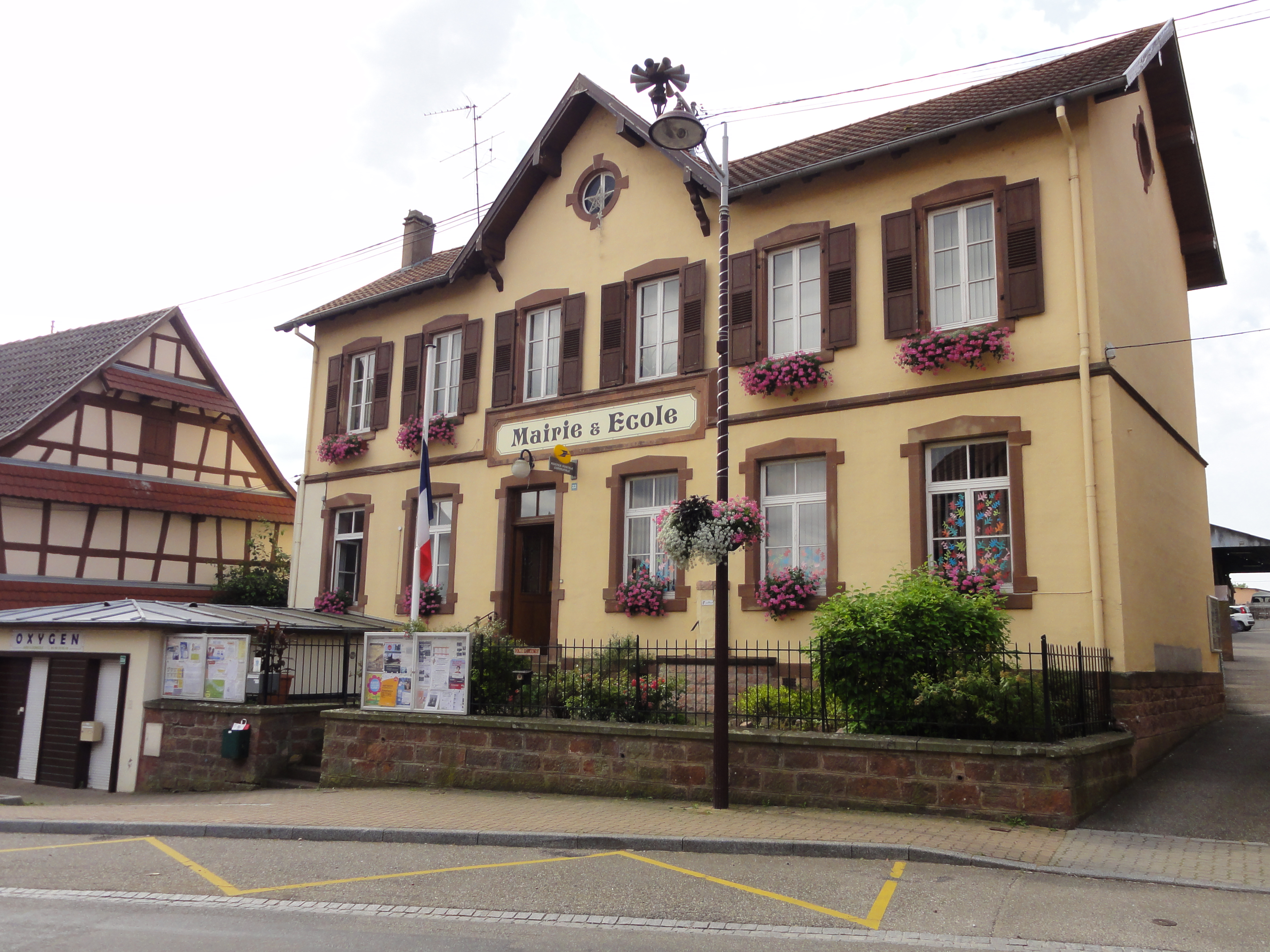
- The town hall in Quatzenheim

- Coat of arms
- Location of Quatzenheim
- Location within France Location within Grand Est
- Coordinates: 48°37′37″N 7°34′25″E
- Country: France
- Region: Grand Est
- Department: Bas-Rhin
- Arrondissement: Saverne
- Canton: Bouxwiller
- Intercommunality: Kochersberg

Government
  - Mayor (2020–2026): Jacky Wagner
- Area^{1}: 3.07 km^{2} (1.19 sq mi)
- Elevation: 165 m (541 ft)
- Highest elevation: 193 m (633 ft)
- Lowest elevation: 156 m (512 ft)
- Population (2023): 782
  - Density: 255/km^{2} (660/sq mi)
- Time zone: UTC+01:00 (CET)
  - Summer (DST): UTC+02:00 (CEST)
- INSEE/Postal code: 67382 /67117
- ^{1} French Land Register data, which excludes lakes, ponds, glaciers > 1 km^{2} (0.386 sq mi or 247 acres) and river estuaries.

Quatzenheim (French pronunciation: [kvatsənaim]; Alsatian: Zwàtzne) is a commune in the Bas-Rhin department in Grand Est in north-eastern France.

It grew up along an old Roman road leading from Strasbourg to Saverne.

== Population ==
Historical population
Year	Pop.	±% p.a.
1968	467	—
1975	499	+0.95%
1982	540	+1.13%
1990	557	+0.39%
1999	710	+2.73%
2007	775	+1.10%
2012	820	+1.14%
2017	781	−0.97%
2023	782	+0.02%
Source: INSEE

== See also ==
- Communes of the Bas-Rhin department
- Kochersberg
