= Griesheim-sur-Souffel =

- Commune
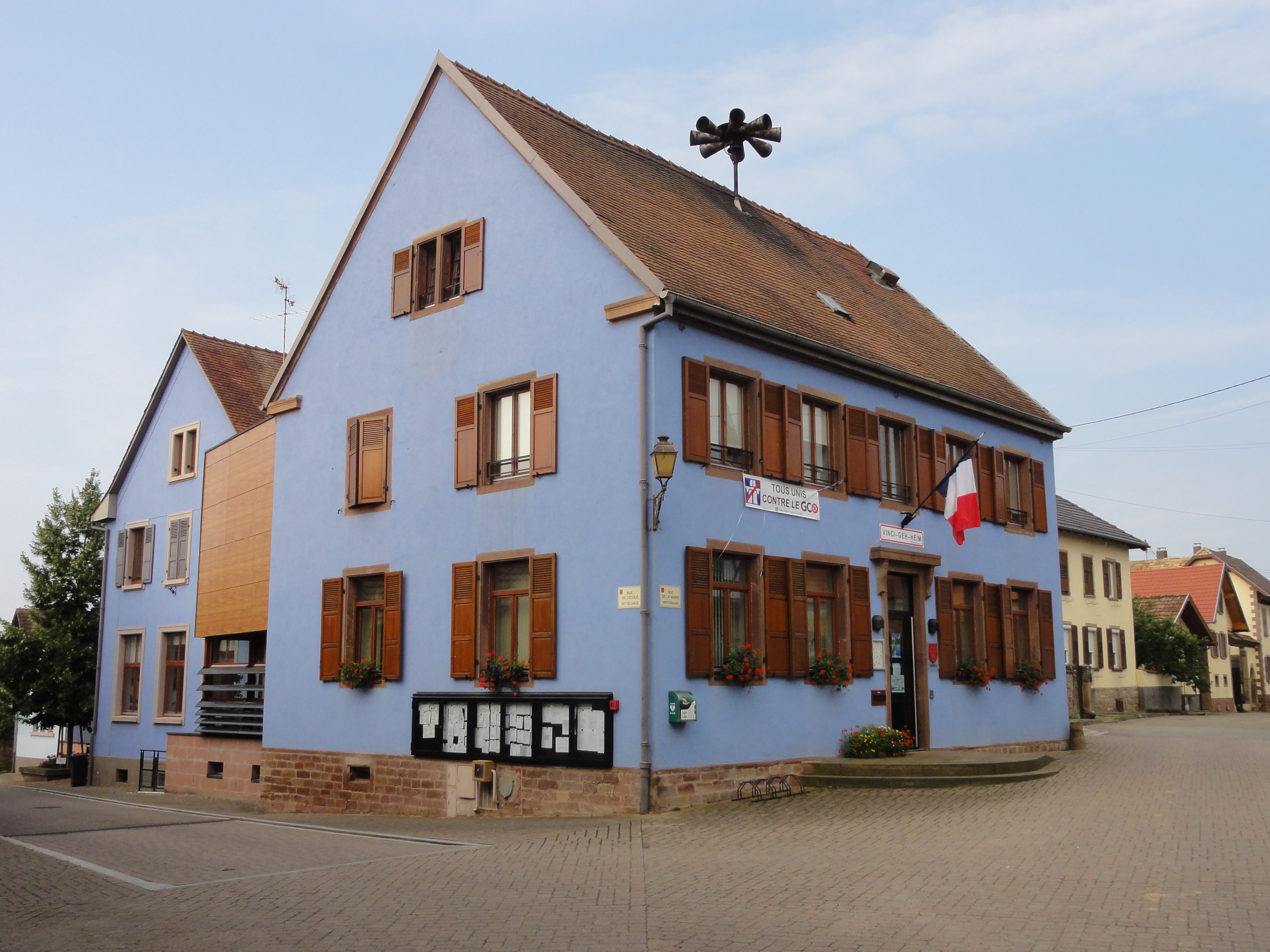
- The town hall in Griesheim-sur-Souffel

- Coat of arms
- Location of Griesheim-sur-Souffel
- Location within France Location within Grand Est
- Coordinates: 48°38′08″N 7°40′04″E
- Country: France
- Region: Grand Est
- Department: Bas-Rhin
- Arrondissement: Saverne
- Canton: Bouxwiller
- Intercommunality: CC Kochersberg

Government
  - Mayor (2020–2026): René Wunenburger
- Area^{1}: 4.19 km^{2} (1.62 sq mi)
- Highest elevation: 192 m (630 ft)
- Lowest elevation: 142 m (466 ft)
- Population (2023): 1,216
  - Density: 290/km^{2} (752/sq mi)
- Time zone: UTC+01:00 (CET)
  - Summer (DST): UTC+02:00 (CEST)
- INSEE/Postal code: 67173 /67370
- ^{1} French Land Register data, which excludes lakes, ponds, glaciers > 1 km^{2} (0.386 sq mi or 247 acres) and river estuaries.

Griesheim-sur-Souffel is a commune in the Bas-Rhin département in Grand Est in north-eastern France. It is positioned about 8 kilometers to the northwest of the city centre of Strasbourg.

Griesheim-sur-Souffel is one of the 23 member communes of the Community of Communes of the Kochersberg.

Griesheim-sur-Souffel should not be confused with Griesheim-près-Molsheim, a slightly larger village positioned, as its name indicates, a short distance from Molsheim. The two Griesheims are less than twenty kilometres (twelve miles) apart.

The Souffel stream runs by the village's border with its neighbour village of Dingsheim.

== See also ==
- Communes of the Bas-Rhin department
- Kochersberg
