= Nikolaus Ager =

French botanist (1568–1634)

- Born: 1568; Ittenheim
- Died: 26 June 1634; Strasbourg
- Other names: Nicolas Ager, Agerius
- Education: Basle, Strasbourg
- Known for: De Anima Vegetativa (1629)
- Awards: The genus Ageria (family Aquifoliaceae) was named in his honor
- Scientific career
- Fields: Botany
- Institutions: Strasbourg

Nikolaus Ager, name also spelled Nicolas Ager and sometimes referred to as Agerius (1568, Ittenheim – 26 June 1634, Strasbourg) was a physician and botanist born in Alsace. He was the author of the treatise "De Anima Vegetativa" (1629).

He studied medicine in Basel, subsequently obtaining doctorates in medicine and philosophy in Strasbourg. In 1618 he became a professor of medicine and botany at Strasbourg. During his career, he worked closely with famed botanists Johann and Gaspard Bauhin.

In 1763 Michel Adanson named the genus Ageria (family Aquifoliaceae) in his honor.

== Written works ==
From 1623 to 1634 he published a series of disputations, a few of them being: "De vita et morte", "De nutritione", "De mente humana", "De monstris" and "De somno et insomniis". In 1602 he published a new edition of Walther Hermann Ryff's "Reformierte Deütsche Apoteck" (Reformed German chemist) as "Newe ausgerüste deutsche Apoteck". The following are a list of some of his better known works:

- "Theses physico-medicae de homine sano", 1593.
- "Disputatio de dyssenteria", 1593.
- "Disputatio de Zoophytis", 1625.
- "De Anima Vegetativa", 1629.
