= Communauté de communes du Kochersberg =

Federation of municipalities in France

Kochersberg
- Communauté de communes
- Interactive map of Kochersberg
- Coordinates: 48°39′N 07°36′E
- Country: France
- Region: Grand Est
- Department: Bas-Rhin
- No. of communes: {{{nbcomm}}}
- Established: 2001
- Area: 133.9 km^{2} (51.7 sq mi)
- Population (2019): 26,130
  - Density: 195.1/km^{2} (505.4/sq mi)
- Website: www.kochersberg.fr

The Communauté de communes du Kochersberg is a French intercommunal structure gathering most of the communes of the natural region of Kochersberg, département of Bas-Rhin, région Grand Est. Its area is 133.9 km^{2}, and its population was 26,130 in 2019. Its seat is in Truchtersheim.

== History ==
It has been created on 14 December 2001; the communes of the former Communauté de communes Ackerland joined the Communauté de communes du Kochersberg in January 2013.

== Composition ==
The communauté de communes consists of the following 23 communes:

1. Berstett
2. Dingsheim
3. Dossenheim-Kochersberg
4. Durningen
5. Fessenheim-le-Bas
6. Furdenheim
7. Gougenheim
8. Griesheim-sur-Souffel
9. Handschuheim
10. Hurtigheim
11. Ittenheim
12. Kienheim
13. Kuttolsheim
14. Neugartheim-Ittlenheim
15. Pfulgriesheim
16. Quatzenheim
17. Rohr
18. Schnersheim
19. Stutzheim-Offenheim
20. Truchtersheim
21. Willgottheim
22. Wintzenheim-Kochersberg
23. Wiwersheim
