= Pfulgriesheim =

- Commune
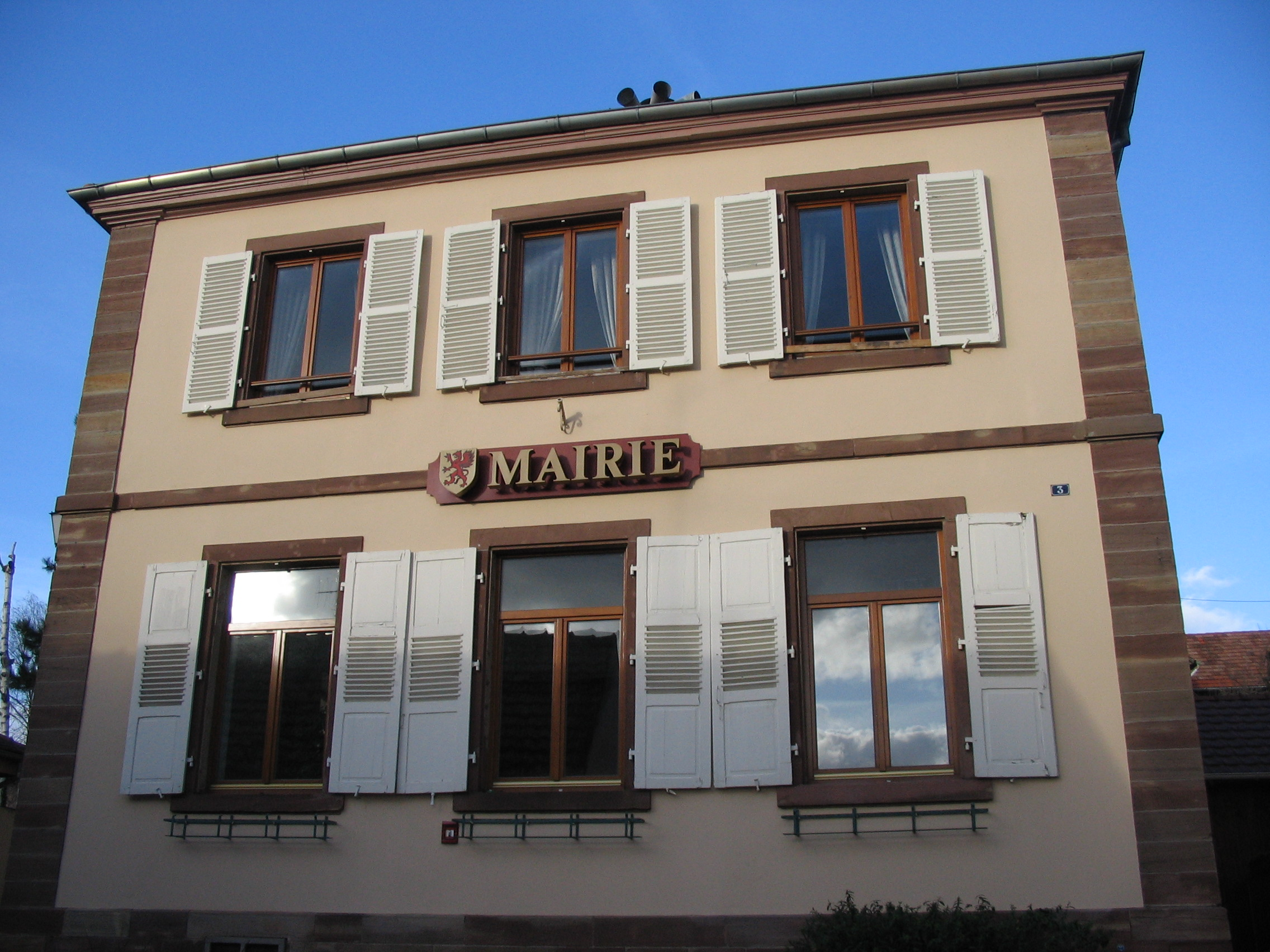
- The town hall in Pfulgriesheim

- Coat of arms
- Location of Pfulgriesheim
- Location within France Location within Grand Est
- Coordinates: 48°38′40″N 7°40′18″E
- Country: France
- Region: Grand Est
- Department: Bas-Rhin
- Arrondissement: Saverne
- Canton: Bouxwiller
- Intercommunality: CC Kochersberg

Government
  - Mayor (2020–2026): André Jacob
- Area^{1}: 4.81 km^{2} (1.86 sq mi)
- Highest elevation: 177 m (581 ft)
- Lowest elevation: 147 m (482 ft)
- Population (2023): 1,282
  - Density: 267/km^{2} (690/sq mi)
- Time zone: UTC+01:00 (CET)
  - Summer (DST): UTC+02:00 (CEST)
- INSEE/Postal code: 67375 /67370
- ^{1} French Land Register data, which excludes lakes, ponds, glaciers > 1 km^{2} (0.386 sq mi or 247 acres) and river estuaries.

Pfulgriesheim (German: Pfülgriesheim) is a commune in the Bas-Rhin department in Grand Est in north-eastern France.

It lies northwest of Strasbourg along the D41 road out of the city.

== See also ==
- Communes of the Bas-Rhin department
- Kochersberg
