= Hurtigheim =

- Commune
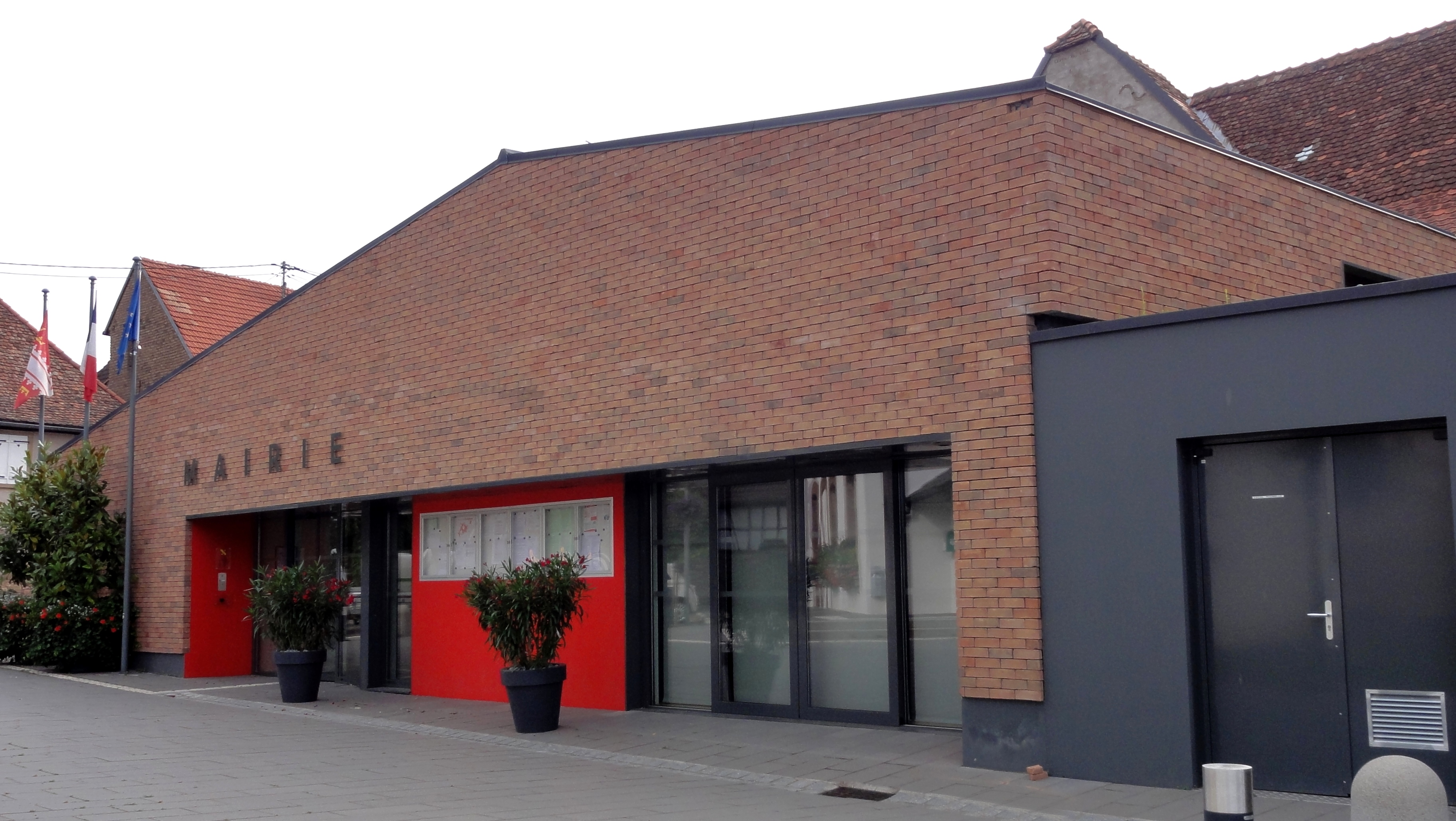
- The town hall in Hurtigheim

- Coat of arms
- Location of Hurtigheim
- Location within France Location within Grand Est
- Coordinates: 48°37′01″N 7°35′35″E
- Country: France
- Region: Grand Est
- Department: Bas-Rhin
- Arrondissement: Saverne
- Canton: Bouxwiller
- Intercommunality: CC Kochersberg

Government
  - Mayor (2020–2026): Jean-Jacques Ruch
- Area^{1}: 4.63 km^{2} (1.79 sq mi)
- Highest elevation: 179 m (587 ft)
- Lowest elevation: 153 m (502 ft)
- Population (2023): 988
  - Density: 213/km^{2} (553/sq mi)
- Time zone: UTC+01:00 (CET)
  - Summer (DST): UTC+02:00 (CEST)
- INSEE/Postal code: 67214 /67117
- ^{1} French Land Register data, which excludes lakes, ponds, glaciers > 1 km^{2} (0.386 sq mi or 247 acres) and river estuaries.

Hurtigheim (French pronunciation: [yʁtikaim]; German: Hürtigheim) is a commune in the Bas-Rhin department in Grand Est in north-eastern France.

Hurtigheim has been built along an old Roman road leading from Strasbourg to Saverne.

== Notable people ==
Jean-Jacques Urban, a prominent politician of the Democratic Republican Alliance in the 1930s and 1940s, was born at Hurtigheim on 26 October 1875. The party emerged discredited from the Vichy period, but Urban himself did not participate in the voting of full powers to Philippe Pétain in July 1940.

== See also ==
- Communes of the Bas-Rhin department
- Kochersberg
