= Griesheim-près-Molsheim =

- Commune
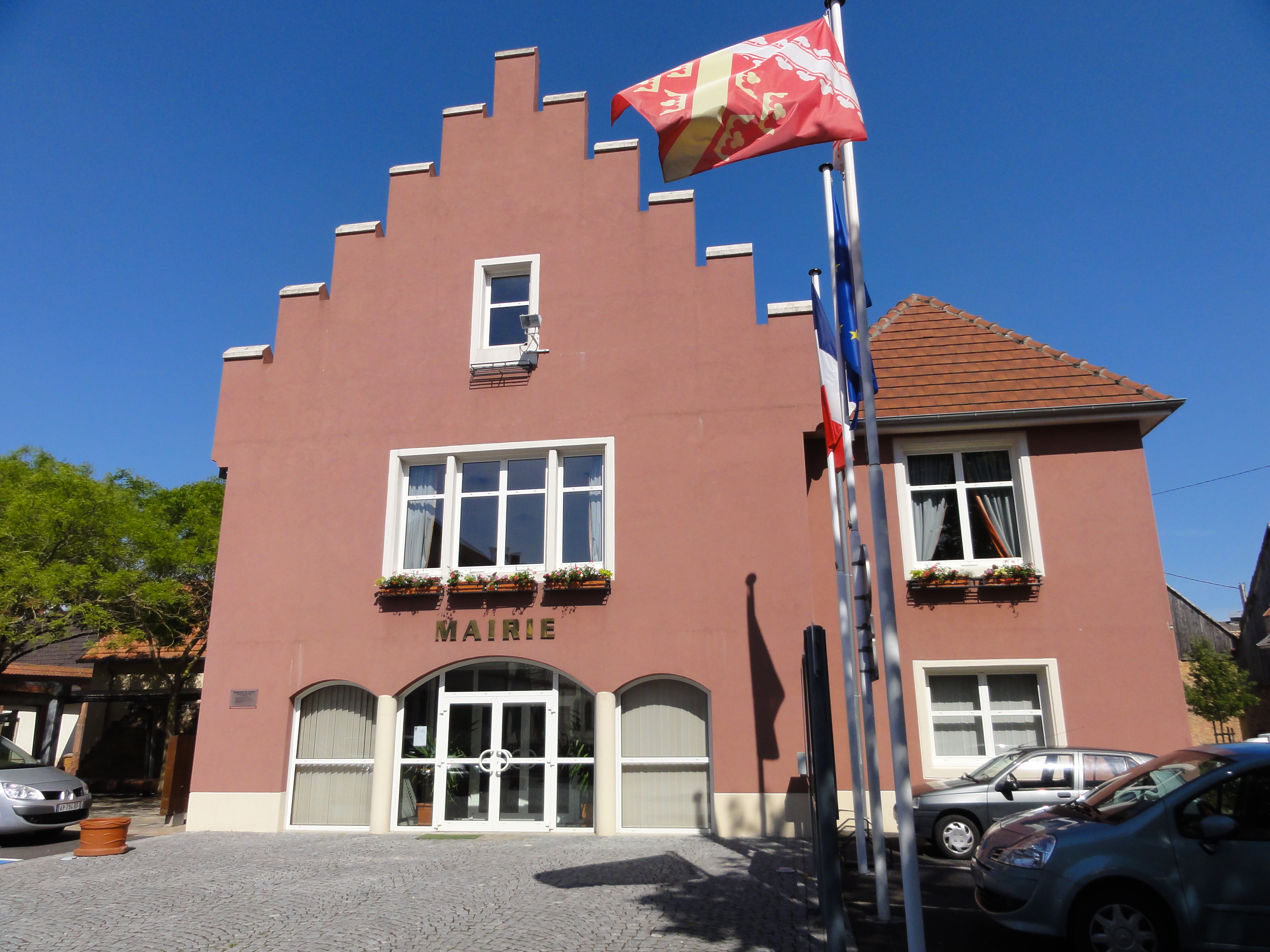
- The town hall in Griesheim-près-Molsheim

- Coat of arms
- Location of Griesheim-près-Molsheim
- Location within France Location within Grand Est
- Coordinates: 48°30′14″N 7°31′56″E
- Country: France
- Region: Grand Est
- Department: Bas-Rhin
- Arrondissement: Molsheim
- Canton: Molsheim
- Intercommunality: Portes de Rosheim

Government
  - Mayor (2020–2026): Christophe Friedrich
- Area^{1}: 4.62 km^{2} (1.78 sq mi)
- Highest elevation: 191 m (627 ft)
- Lowest elevation: 156 m (512 ft)
- Population (2023): 2,351
  - Density: 509/km^{2} (1,320/sq mi)
- Time zone: UTC+01:00 (CET)
  - Summer (DST): UTC+02:00 (CEST)
- INSEE/Postal code: 67172 /67870
- ^{1} French Land Register data, which excludes lakes, ponds, glaciers > 1 km^{2} (0.386 sq mi or 247 acres) and river estuaries.

Griesheim-près-Molsheim (French pronunciation: [ɡʁisaim pʁɛ mɔlsaim], literally Griesheim near Molsheim; German: Griesheim bei Molsheim) is a commune in the Bas-Rhin department in Grand Est in north-eastern France.

It is one of nine member communes of the Communauté de communes des Portes de Rosheim.

== Geography ==
Griesheim lies some five kilometres (three miles) to the south-east of Molsheim.

The village is well connected, just eight kilometres (five miles) south-west of Strasbourg airport, with the centre of Strasbourg some eighteen kilometres (eleven miles) away. Griesheim is a couple of kilometres from the recently extended A35 autoroute on one side and the A352 autoroute on the other, although delays exacerbated by traffic congestion are a frequent feature of the roads in the Molsheim and Strasbourg areas. For rail travellers, the nearest station is in the neighbouring village of Rosheim.

About seven miles (four kilometres) to the west, the Upper Rhine plain gives way to the lower wooded slopes of the Vosges Mountains. To the east the land becomes progressively flatter and the agricultural potential of the alluvial soil richer between the village and the River Rhine.

Griesheim-près-Molsheim should not be confused with Griesheim-sur-Souffel, a village on the northern edge of Strasbourg. The two Griesheims are less than twenty kilometres (twelve miles) apart.

=== Adjacent communes ===
- Bischoffsheim
- Rosheim
- Altorf
- Innenheim
- Dorlisheim

== Population ==
Historical population
Year	Pop.	±% p.a.
1968	802	—
1975	1,094	+4.54%
1982	1,309	+2.60%
1990	1,503	+1.74%
1999	1,722	+1.52%
2007	1,950	+1.57%
2012	2,125	+1.73%
2017	2,188	+0.59%
2023	2,351	+1.20%
Source: INSEE

== See also ==
- Communes of the Bas-Rhin department
