= Handschuheim =

- Commune
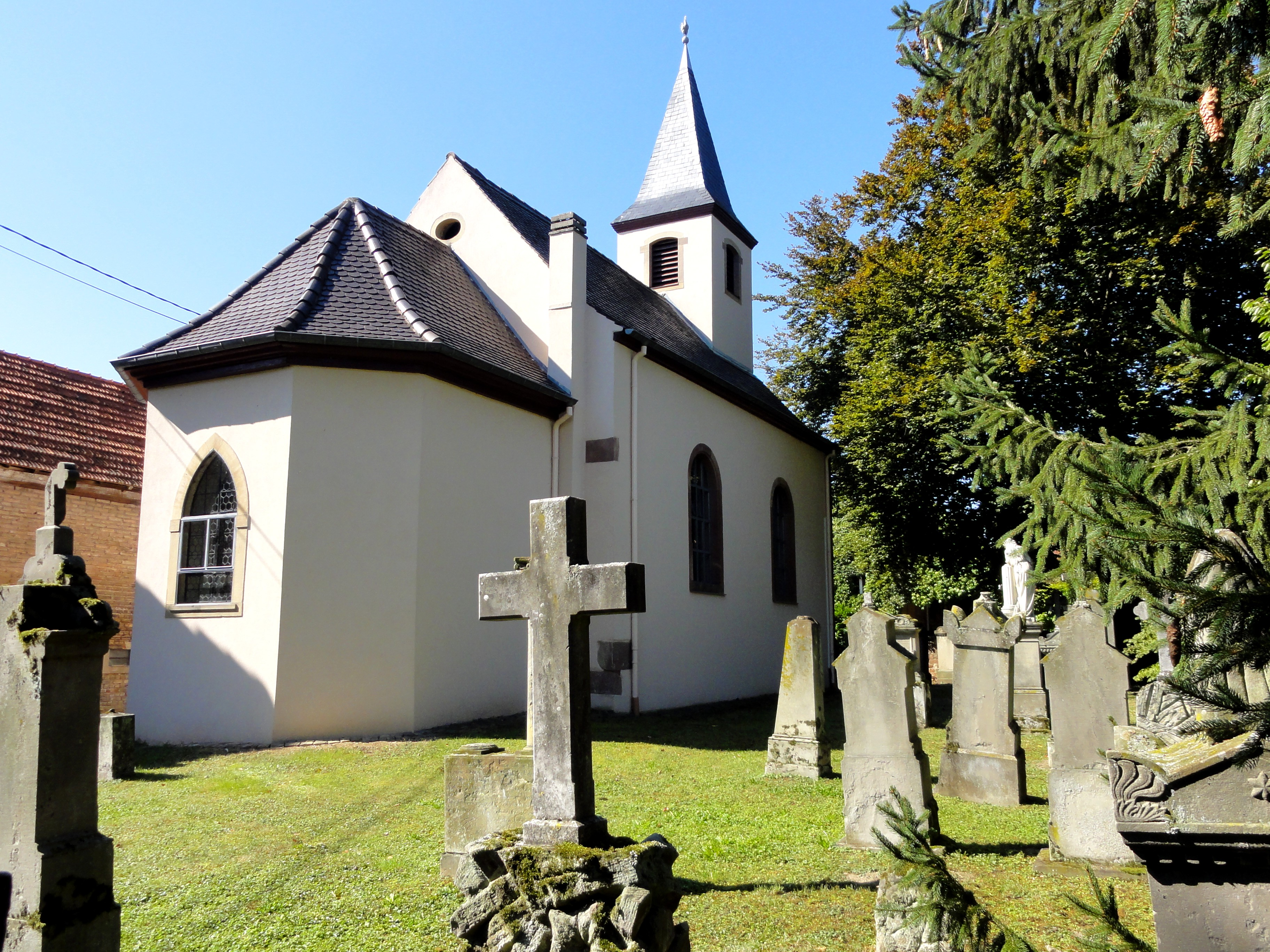
- The Protestant church in Handschuheim

- Coat of arms
- Location of Handschuheim
- Location within France Location within Grand Est
- Coordinates: 48°36′13″N 7°34′41″E
- Country: France
- Region: Grand Est
- Department: Bas-Rhin
- Arrondissement: Saverne
- Canton: Bouxwiller
- Intercommunality: CC Kochersberg

Government
  - Mayor (2020–2026): Alfred Schmitt
- Area^{1}: 2.4 km^{2} (0.93 sq mi)
- Highest elevation: 213 m (699 ft)
- Lowest elevation: 173 m (568 ft)
- Population (2023): 281
  - Density: 120/km^{2} (300/sq mi)
- Time zone: UTC+01:00 (CET)
  - Summer (DST): UTC+02:00 (CEST)
- INSEE/Postal code: 67181 /67117
- ^{1} French Land Register data, which excludes lakes, ponds, glaciers > 1 km^{2} (0.386 sq mi or 247 acres) and river estuaries.

Handschuheim (French pronunciation: [ɑ̃dʃuajm] ) is a commune in the Bas-Rhin department in Grand Est in north-eastern France.

It lies a few kilometres to the west of Strasbourg along the old national road RN4.

== See also ==
- Communes of the Bas-Rhin department
- Kochersberg
