= Dingsheim =

Dingsheim Díngse
- Commune
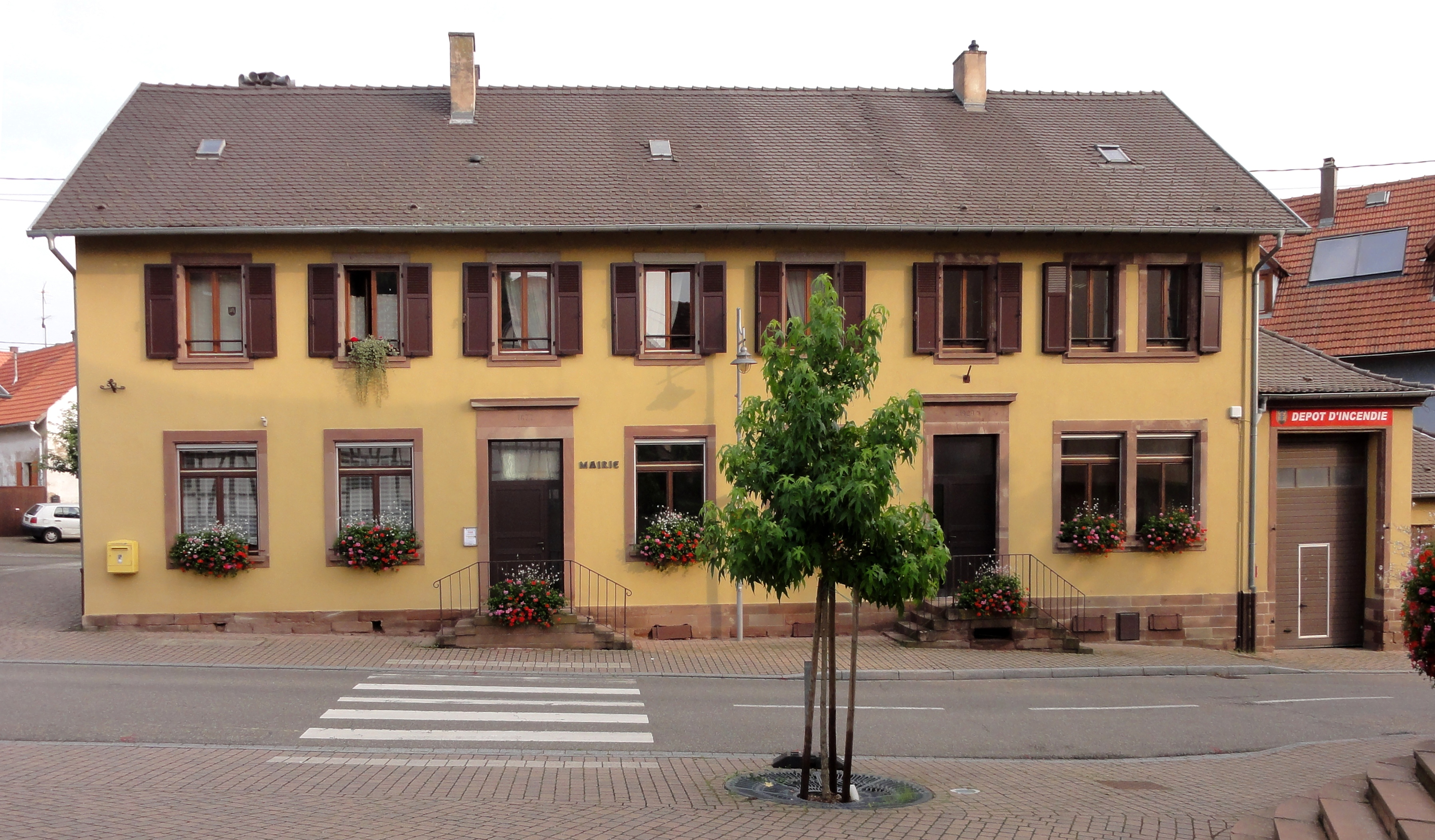
- The town hall in Dingsheim

- Coat of arms
- Location of Dingsheim
- Location within France Location within Grand Est
- Coordinates: 48°37′53″N 7°40′13″E
- Country: France
- Region: Grand Est
- Department: Bas-Rhin
- Arrondissement: Saverne
- Canton: Bouxwiller
- Intercommunality: CC Kochersberg

Government
  - Mayor (2020–2026): Gaston Burger
- Area^{1}: 4.95 km^{2} (1.91 sq mi)
- Highest elevation: 180 m (590 ft)
- Lowest elevation: 146 m (479 ft)
- Population (2023): 1,237
  - Density: 250/km^{2} (647/sq mi)
- Time zone: UTC+01:00 (CET)
  - Summer (DST): UTC+02:00 (CEST)
- INSEE/Postal code: 67097 /67370
- ^{1} French Land Register data, which excludes lakes, ponds, glaciers > 1 km^{2} (0.386 sq mi or 247 acres) and river estuaries.

Dingsheim is a commune in the Bas-Rhin department in Grand Est in north-eastern France.

== See also ==
- Communes of the Bas-Rhin department
- Kochersberg
