= Kochersberg =

Natural region of the French département of Bas-Rhin in Alsace

Coordinates: 48.665°N 7.53056°E

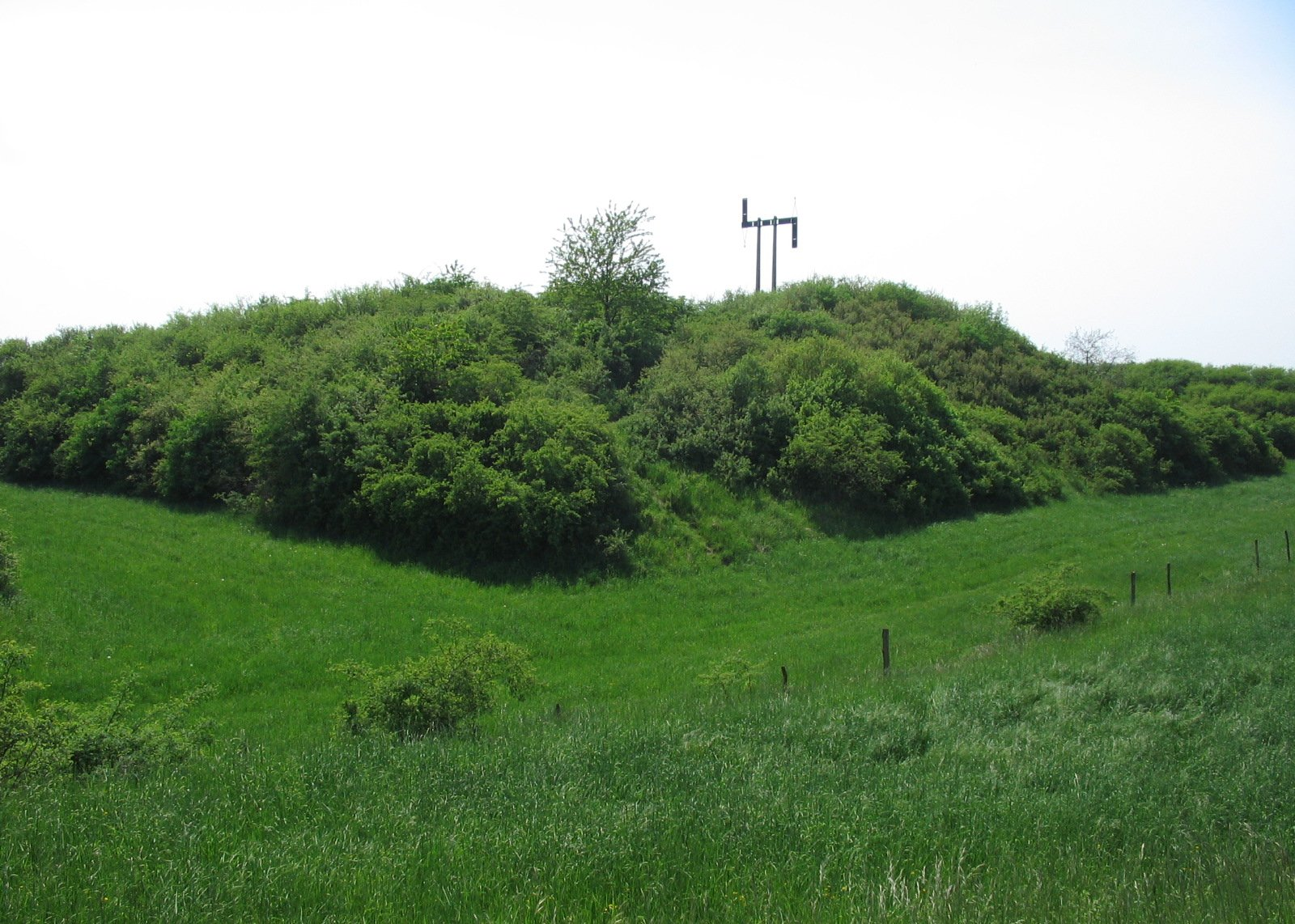
The top of the Kochersberg hill, the site of an early castle, today replaced by a semaphore tower memorial.

The Kochersberg (French pronunciation: [kɔxəʁsbɛʁɡ]) is a natural region of the French département of Bas-Rhin in Alsace and is a part of the hills found along the eastern side of the Vosges mountains. It gave its name to the Communauté de communes du Kochersberg, a cooperation of 23 municipalities.

Its name comes from the Kochersberg hill; its highest peak (301 m), stands over Neugartheim-Ittlenheim.

A castle was built on its top in the 13th century. It was destroyed in 1592 and only traces remain.

Between 1794 and 1797, a semaphore tower was built in its place. It was the second relay (after Dingsheim), of the optical telegraph line from Strasbourg to Paris via Saverne and its pass and was used until 1852.

This relay has been replaced in the late 20th century by a motionless memorial which can still be seen (weather permitting), from ten kilometers away.

== See also ==
- Hausbergen
