= Gaby oh Gaby =

Single by Alain Bashung

from the album Roulette russe and Pizza
- B-side: "Ell' s'fait rougir toute seule"
- Released: 1980
- Genre: New wave
- Length: 3:40
- Label: Philips Records
- Songwriters: Boris Bergman; Alain Bashung
- Producer: Claude Alvarez-Pereyre

Alain Bashung singles chronology
"Je fume pour oublier que tu bois" (1979)	"Gaby oh Gaby" (1980)	"Vertige de l'amour" (1981)

"Gaby oh Gaby" is a song first published by Alain Bashung. Written by Boris Bergman with music by Bashung, it was initially published as a single in 1980 on Philips, with "Ell' s'fait rougir toute seule" as the B-side. The single became a huge hit in France, and therefore the song was included on the album Roulette russe in a reissue nicknamed Nouveau couplage, and then on the CD reissue of the next album, Pizza.

== Reception ==
=== Commercial reception ===
When the single came out, Bashung had been a singer for fourteen years. The singles recorded between 1966 and 1977 were all commercial failures and his first album, Roman-photos, issued in 1977, which he would later disown, was one as well. "Gaby oh Gaby" sold more than one million copies and revealed the singer to a larger audience. The song was shown in numerous TV shows on the evening and during the night, broadcast on radio, and was even in first page of the newspaper Libération.

However, even if he admits that this hit saved him at the time, Bashung was caught off-guard by this unexpected success. On the album Play blessures issued in 1982, Bashung sang about this on his song "J'croise aux hybrides" : "J'dédie cette angoisse à un chanteur disparu, mort de soif dans le désert de « Gaby ». Respectez une minute de silence, faites comme si j'étais pas arrivé..." (I dedicate this anguish to a singer who vanished, dead of thirst in the "Gaby" desert. Respect a minute of silence, act as if I never came...)

On May 19, 2009, the Gold Disc of the original 45 rpm was sold on auction in Paris by its owner, a collector. It was sold for €3717.

=== Critical reception ===
The song is included in a list of 3000 rock classics in the book La Discothèque parfaite de l'odyssée du rock by Gilles Verlant, who calls the track "Gaby oh Gaby" one of the "summits of the decade" alongside the next single "Vertige de l'amour".

== Subject ==
Boris Bergman, the lyricist, explained after the death of Alain Bashung : "C’est un texte sur les minorités, ceux que «la différence» fait tomber dans les puits de solitude; ceux qui ne peuvent pas dormir et qui «ne font que des conneries». Le petit Ashkénaze que je suis, le Kabylo-Alsacien qu’est Alain, s’en doutent depuis leur première rencontre avec l’autre : "Gaby" est aussi un hymne caché à la solitude de l’homo qui ne connaît pas encore l’existence du PACS." (It's a text about minorities, those who "the difference" throw into a well of loneliness; those who can't sleep and "do bad stuff". The little ashkenaze that I am, the kabylo-alsacian who Alain was, probably since their first meeting: "Gaby" is also a hidden hymn to the loneliness of the gay person who does not know about the existence of the PACS).
