= Osez Joséphine =

Studio album by Alain Bashung
- Released: 28 October 1991
- Recorded: July–September 1991
- Studios: Ardent Studios, Memphis, Tennessee; Studios Plus XXX, Paris, France; Studio ICP, Brussels, Belgium
- Genres: French rock; roots rock; Americana; alternative rock
- Length: 38:33
- Label: Barclay
- Producers: Alain Bashung, Éric Clermontet, Marc Antoine

Alain Bashung chronology
Novice (1989)	Osez Joséphine (1991)	Tour Novice (1992)

Singles from Osez Joséphine
- 1. "Osez Joséphine" Released: November 1991; 2. "J'écume" Released: 1992; 3. "Madame Rêve" Released: 1992; 4. "Volutes" Released: October 1992

Osez Joséphine (Dare Joséphine) is the eighth studio album by French musician Alain Bashung, issued on 28 October 1991 by Barclay Records. Rolling Stone magazine considered it the greatest French album of all time.

== Reception ==
=== Commercial performance ===
The singles "Osez Joséphine", "Volutes" and "Madame rêve" ("Madame dreams") were successful, as was the album which peaked at 14th on the French charts. With this album, Bashung broke into the mainstream. The album sold 300,000 copies rather quickly for a French album at the time.

=== Critical reception ===
Professional ratings
Review scores
Source	Rating
Allmusic	4.5/5 stars

In 2010, the French edition of Rolling Stone magazine gave this album the top spot of their list of the greatest French rock albums (out of 100). The album is included in the book La discothèque parfaite de l'odyssée du rock by Gilles Verlant, who calls Madame rêve, Osez Joséphine and Volutes "new classics from his repertoire" and the guitar riff by Sonny Landreth on Osez Joséphine "historical".

=== Legacy ===
In 2016, Australian psychedelic rock artist Nicholas Allbrook conceived his video for his single "A Fool There Was" (from his album Pure Gardiya) as a tribute to the video for the title track of Osez Joséphine.

== Track listing ==
No.	Title	Writer(s)	Length
1.	"J'écume"	Alain Bashung / Jean Fauque - Alain Bashung	3:44
2.	"Volutes"	Alain Bashung / Jean Fauque - Alain Bashung	3:25
3.	"Happe"	Alain Bashung / Jean Fauque - Alain Bashung	3:06
4.	"Well All Right"	Buddy Holly, Norman Petty, Jerry Allison, Joe B. Mauldin	2:09
5.	"Les Grands Voyageurs"	Laurent Petitgand / Jean Fauque - Alain Bashung	4:46
6.	"Blue Eyes Crying in the Rain"	Fred Rose	2:13
7.	"Osez Joséphine"	Alain Bashung / Jean Fauque - Alain Bashung	2:58
8.	"Kalabougie"	Alain Bashung / Jean Fauque - Alain Bashung	3:23
9.	"She Belongs to Me"	Bob Dylan	4:09
10.	"Madame rêve"	Pierre Grillet - Alain Bashung	4:50
11.	"Nights in White Satin"	Justin Hayward	4:50

== Personnel ==
=== Musicians ===
- Alain Bashung - vocals, harmonica (5, 6, 9)
- Sonny Landreth - electric guitar (1, 4, 5, 7, 9), slide guitar (2, 5, 7, 9), acoustic guitar (2, 3, 4, 7), lapsteel & wind (3)
- Bernie Leadon - electric guitar (1, 5, 7), acoustic guitar (2, 4, 9), mandoline (7)
- Roland Vancampenhout - electric guitar (1, 5, 8), harmonica (5)
- Ron Levy - Hammond organ (1, 2, 3, 7, 9)
- Ken Blevins - drums (1, 2, 4, 7, 9), chimes (3)
- David Ranson - bass guitar (1, 2, 3, 4, 9), bass & strings (4)
- Philippe Decock - keyboards (3, 10), piano (8)

=== Production ===
- Tom Harding: sound engineer (Memphis)
- Sophie Masson: sound engineer (Paris)
- Phil Delire: sound engineer (Bruxelles), mixing, realisation
- Éric Clermontet: realisation, executive production
- Alain Bashung: realisation
- Marc Antoine: realisation, executive production
- Jean-Baptiste Mondino: photos
- Huart / Cholley: graphism

== Certifications ==
Region	Certification	Certified units/sales
France (SNEP)	Platinum	300,000^{*}
^{*} Sales figures based on certification alone.
