= Passé le Rio Grande =

Studio album by Alain Bashung
- Released: 7 October 1986
- Genre: French rock; new wave
- Label: Philips; Barclay; Universal Music Group
- Producer: Nick Patrick

Alain Bashung chronology
| Live Tour 85 (1985) | Passé le Rio Grande (1986) | Novice (1989) |

Passé le Rio Grande (Passed the Rio Grande) is the sixth studio album by French rocker Alain Bashung, issued in 1986 on Philips Records.

== Production ==
After the commercial failures of the albums Play blessures in 1982 and Figure imposée in 1983, Bashung experienced success anew with the single "S.O.S. Amor" in 1984. The single helped him to give his career a new start.

In the wake of this success, he published this album, co-written by Boris Bergman, who was the main lyricist for his first three albums. The album features the singles "Malédiction" ("Curse") which was quite successful as well, and "L'Arrivée du tour" ("The Arrival of the tour").

== Critical reception ==
Passé le Rio Grande was awarded the Best rock album of the year award at the Victoires de la musique awards in 1986, the first for Bashung.

== Track listing ==
| No. | Title | Writer(s) | Length |
|---|---|---|---|
| 1. | "Helvète Underground" | Boris Bergman - Alain Bashung | 3:39 |
| 2. | "Camping jazz" | Boris Bergman - Alain Bashung | 3:46 |
| 3. | "Dean Martin" | Boris Bergman - Alain Bashung | 4:19 |
| 4. | "Douane Eddy" | Boris Bergman - Alain Bashung | 3:11 |
| 5. | "Malédiction" | Boris Bergman - Alain Bashung | 3:38 |
| 6. | "L'Arrivée du Tour" | Boris Bergman - Alain Bashung | 4:01 |
| 7. | "Herr Major" | Boris Bergman - Alain Bashung | 3:29 |
| 8. | "Milady" | Boris Bergman - Alain Bashung | 3:12 |
| 9. | "Rognons 1515" | Boris Bergman - Alain Bashung | 3:53 |
| 10. | "Chat" | Boris Bergman - Alain Bashung | 2:40 |

=== Bonus Track (1992 CD reissue) ===
| No. | Title | Writer(s) | Length |
|---|---|---|---|
| 11. | "L'Arrivée du Tour (Remix)" | Boris Bergman - Alain Bashung | 6:14 |

=== Bonus Tracks (subsequent CD reissues) ===
| No. | Title | Writer(s) | Length |
|---|---|---|---|
| 12. | "S.O.S. Amor" | Alain Bashung / Didier Golemanas - Alain Bashung | 4:04 |
| 13. | "Tu touches pas à mon pote" | Boris Bergman - Alain Bashung | 4:12 |
| 14. | "Les Européennes" | Alain Bashung / Didier Golemanas - Alain Bashung | 4:12 |

== Personnel ==
- Alain Bashung - vocals, harmonica, bells
- Johnny Turnbull, Les Davidson, Olivier Guindon - guitar
- Norman Watt-Roy - bass
- Vic Emerson - keyboards
- Philippe Draï - drums
- The Flying Pickets - backing vocals
- Gary Barnacle - saxophone (uncredited)
