= Chatterton (album) =

Studio album by Alain Bashung
- Released: 1994
- Recorded: ICP Studio, Brussels
- Genre: French rock, Alternative country, Alternative rock
- Label: Barclay, Universal Music Group
- Producer: Phil Delire, Alain Bashung, Djoum, Marc Thonon

Alain Bashung chronology
Réservé aux indiens (1993)	Chatterton (1994)	Confessions publiques (1995)

Chatterton is the ninth studio album by French rocker Alain Bashung, issued in 1994 on Barclay Records.

== Production ==
The music melds the use of pedal steel guitar with synths, for instance on "J'passe pour une caravane" ("They mistake me for a caravan"), and the style was dubbed "country new age" by Bashung himself. The most well-known track on the album in France is "Ma petite entreprise" ("My little business") which was popularized when it was used as the theme song to the movie My Little Business by Pierre Jolivet in 1999.

== Reception ==
=== Critical reception ===
In 2010, the French edition of Rolling Stone magazine named this album the 40th greatest French rock album (out of 100).

== Track listing ==
No.	Title	Writer(s)	Length
1.	"À perte de vue"	Alain Bashung / Jean Fauque - Alain Bashung	5:07
2.	"Que n'ai-je"	Alain Bashung / Jean Fauque - Alain Bashung	3:55
3.	"Ma petite entreprise"	Alain Bashung / Jean Fauque - Alain Bashung	4:11
4.	"Elvire"	Alain Bashung / Jean Fauque - Alain Bashung	4:19
5.	"Un âne plane"	Alain Bashung / Jean Fauque - Alain Bashung	3:56
6.	"Après d'âpres hostilités"	Alain Bashung / Jean Fauque - Alain Bashung	4:24
7.	"J'avais un pense-bête"	Alain Bashung / Jean Fauque - Alain Bashung	3:26
8.	"J'passe pour une caravane"	Alain Bashung / Jean Fauque - Alain Bashung	3:42
9.	"Danse d'ici"	Alain Bashung / Jean Fauque - Alain Bashung	4:05
10.	"À Ostende"	Alain Bashung / Jean Fauque - Alain Bashung	4:02
11.	"L'Apiculteur"	Alain Bashung / Jean Fauque - Alain Bashung	4:37
12.	"J'ai longtemps contemplé"	Alain Bashung / Jean Fauque - Alain Bashung / Jean Fauque	3:56

== Personnel ==
=== Musicians ===
- Alain Bashung - vocals, guitars (11)
- Michael Brook - guitar (1 through 9, 11, 12), drums (5), percussions (5)
- Eddie Martinez - guitar (1, 3, 4, 7 through 10, 12)
- Pierre Van Dormael - guitar (1), acoustic guitar (5, 7, 11)
- Nicolas Fiszman - bass guitar (1 à 5, 7, 9 through 11), bass bow (1), acoustic guitar (2), guitar (3, 4)
- Stéphane Belmondo - trumpet (1, 7, 11, 12)
- Marc Ribot - guitar (2, 3, 4, 6, 7, 11)
- Link Wray - guitar (2, 6, 8, 9)
- Jean-Marc Lederman - keyboards (2, 4, 5, 6, 10), drums (2, 6), percussion (2, 6)
- Jean-Pierre Pilot - drums (2, 7, 11, 12), percussion (2, 7, 11, 12)
- Sonny Landreth - guitar (5), slide guitar (3, 8, 10)
- Dony Wynn - percussion (3, 4, 10), drums (4, 8, 9)
- Ally McErlaine - guitars (4, 7 through 10)
- Jean Fauque - drums (4, 11, 12), percussion (4, 11, 12), keyboards (4, 12)

=== Production ===
- Alain Bashung: production
- Djoum: recording, mixing (4, 12), production
- Phil Delire: recording (1 à 11), mixing (1 à 3, 5 à 11), production
- Michel Diericks: recording (3, 4, 6, 7, 11, 12)
- Marc Thonon: executive production
- Jean-Baptiste Mondino: photos
- Huart / Cholley: graphism
