= Bleu pétrole =

Studio album by Alain Bashung
- Released: 24 March 2008
- Recorded: Alice's Restaurant (New York City), Buzz Studio (Paris), Studios ICP (Brussels), Jackpot! Studios (Portland), Looking Glass Studios (New York)
- Genre: French rock, alternative rock
- Length: 50:38
- Label: Barclay Records, Universal Music Group
- Producer: Gaëtan Roussel, Mark Plati

Alain Bashung chronology
La Ballade de Calamity Jane (2006)	Bleu pétrole (2008)	Dimanches à l'Élysée (2009)

Singles from Bleu pétrole
- 1. "Résidents de la République" Released: 2008; 2. "Je t'ai manqué" Released: 2008; 3. "Sur un trapèze" Released: 2009

Bleu pétrole (Petrol blue) is the twelfth studio album by the French rocker Alain Bashung, released in March 2008 on Barclay Records. It was the last studio album released during his lifetime.

== Production ==
Great expectations surrounded Bleu pétrole after L'Imprudence, issued in 2002, and the live album La Tournée des grands espaces, issued in 2004. Bashung took time to work on it, before deciding finally to not work with his lyricist Jean Fauque, choosing instead to work with Gaëtan Roussel of Louise Attaque and Gérard Manset. After the more experimental works of the 2000s, Bashung decided to go back to a more traditional rock-sounding album, closer to his works of the 1990s.

The album is dedicated to Mick Larie, a member of Bluegrass Long Distance, who died in July 2007, the mandoline player and friend of Marcel Dadi and Patrick Sébastien. The first single from the album was "Résidents de la République" ("Residents of the Republic").

Bashung began touring to promote the album and sang "Comme un lego" ("Like a lego") by Gérard Manset as the opener of his concerts. On 7 July 2008, an expanded vinyl collector edition of 1,000 copies was issued.

Bleu pétrole was Bashung's last studio album;, who died on 14 March 2009.

== Reception ==
=== Critical reception ===
Professional ratings
Review scores
Source	Rating
Allmusic	4/5 stars

In 2010, the French edition of Rolling Stone magazine named this album the 46th greatest French rock album (out of 100).

The French magazine Les Inrockuptibles called the album an "immense chef-d'œuvre" (a huge masterpiece).

== Track listing ==
No.	Title	Writer(s)	Length
1.	"Je t'ai manqué"	Gaëtan Roussel - Gaëtan Roussel	3:39
2.	"Résidents de la République"	Gaëtan Roussel - Gaëtan Roussel	3:21
3.	"Tant de nuits"	Joseph d'Anvers - Arman Méliès / Alain Bashung	4:17
4.	"Hier à Sousse"	Gaëtan Roussel - Gaëtan Roussel	3:55
5.	"Vénus"	Gérard Manset - Arman Méliès / Gérard Manset	4:19
6.	"Comme un lego"	Gérard Manset - Gérard Manset	9:04
7.	"Sur un trapèze"	Gaëtan Roussel - Gaëtan Roussel	3:47
8.	"Je tuerai la pianiste"	Gérard Manset - Gaëtan Roussel / Alain Bashung	6:11
9.	"Suzanne"	Leonard Cohen (adapt. Graeme Allwright) - Leonard Cohen	4:09
10.	"Le Secret des Banquises"	Gaëtan Roussel - Alain Bashung / Gaëtan Roussel	3:35
11.	"Il voyage en solitaire"	Gérard Manset - Gérard Manset	4:04

== Personnel ==
=== Musicians ===
- Alain Bashung - vocals
- Gaëtan Roussel - acoustic guitar, electric guitar, ukulele
- Marc Ribot - electric guitar, banjo
- Arman Méliès - electric guitar, banjo
- Mark Plati - bass guitar, guitars, keyboard, drum machine
- Simon Edwards - bass guitar
- Shawn Pelton - drums
- Martyn Barker - drums, bongo
- Tahar Boukhlifa - drums
- M. Ward - electric guitar, acoustic guitar
- String section :
  - Violins - Marian Tache, Erik Sluys, Dick Uten, Bart Lemmens, Tatjana Scleck, Christophe Pochet, Cristina Constantinescu, Annelies Broeckhoven
  - Viola - François Grietje
  - Cellos - Hans Vandaele, Karel Steylaerts
  - Strings direction - Mark Steylaerts

=== Production ===
- Jérôme Witz, element-s: cover art and graphisms
- Ludovic Carême: photos

== Charts ==
=== Weekly charts ===
Chart (2008)	Peak position
Belgian Albums (Ultratop Wallonia)	2
French Albums (SNEP)	1
Swiss Albums (Schweizer Hitparade)	11

=== Year-end charts ===
Chart (2008)	Position
Belgian Albums (Ultratop Wallonia)	16
French Albums (SNEP)	20

Chart (2009)	Position
Belgian Albums (Ultratop Wallonia)	14
French Albums (SNEP)	19

== Certifications ==
Region	Certification	Certified units/sales
Belgium (BRMA)	Gold	15,000^{*}
France (SNEP)	Platinum	200,000^{*}
Switzerland (IFPI Switzerland)	Gold	15,000^{^}
^{*} Sales figures based on certification alone.^{^} Shipments figures based on certification alone.
