= Roulette russe =

Studio album by Alain Bashung
- Released: April 1979 (reissued in 1980 with an altered track listing)
- Genre: French rock, blues, new wave
- Label: Philips Records, Barclay Records, Universal Music Group
- Producer: Claude Alvarez-Pereire

Alain Bashung chronology
Roman-photos (1977)	Roulette russe (1979)	Pizza (1981)

Roulette russe (Russian roulette) is the second album by French rocker Alain Bashung, issued in 1979 on Philips Records. The album was reissued the following years with a couple of songs dropped and the two songs from his breakthrough single, Gaby oh Gaby, added.

== Production ==
In 1979, Alain Bashung was 32 and although he began his career in music more than ten years before, he met no success after the commercial failures of his first singles and his first album, Roman-photos (Fotonovelas) which Bashung later disowned. He often said that Roulette russe was a "last-chance album" of sort.

The album has a rather dark mood, with songs dealing with personal matters, like Elsass Blues about his childhood in Alsace ("J'suis né tout seul près d'la frontière, celle qui vous faisait si peur hier" which means "I was born alone near the border, that very border that you feared yesterday"), but the absurd humour that would be his trademark on his albums with lyricist Boris Bergman was already present.

Standouts from the album include Je fume pour oublier que tu bois ("I smoke to forget that you drink") (first single from the album in 1979), Bijou, bijou ("Jewel, jewel") or Toujours sur la ligne blanche ("Still on the white line") which would remain concert staples.

== Reception ==
=== Commercial performance ===
Roulette russe met with little success on his first issue, but after the release of his breakthrough single Gaby oh Gaby the next year, the album would be rereleased to include the song and therefore enjoyed more success.

=== Critical reception ===
In his book La discothèque parfaite de l'odyssée du rock, Gilles Verlant, although he did not include the album in his list of essential albums, qualified the album string of Roulette russe / Pizza as a "triumph".

== Track listing ==
No.	Title	Writer(s)	Length
1.	"Je fume pour oublier que tu bois"	Boris Bergman - Alain Bashung	4:16
2.	"Station service"	Boris Bergman - Alain Bashung	3:19
3.	"Elsass Blues"	Boris Bergman - Alain Bashung	3:19
4.	"Y'a un yéti"	Boris Bergman - Alain Bashung	2:36
5.	"Guru tu es mon führer de vivre"	Boris Bergman - Alain Bashung	3:08
6.	"Milliards de nuits dans le frigo"	Boris Bergman - Daniel Tardieu - Alain Bashung	2:47
7.	"Pas question que j'perde le feeling"	Boris Bergman - Daniel Tardieu - Alain Bashung	3:54
8.	"Bijou, bijou"	Boris Bergman - Daniel Tardieu - Alain Bashung	4:08
9.	"Les Petits Enfants"	Daniel Tardieu - Alain Bashung	1:12
10.	"Toujours sur la ligne blanche"	Boris Bergman - Alain Bashung	4:39
11.	"Squeeze"	Boris Bergman - Daniel Tardieu - Alain Bashung	3:29

In 1980, a new version of the album was released after the success of the Gaby oh Gaby single. Milliards de nuits dans le frigo and Les Petits Enfants were both dropped for space, and Gaby oh Gaby and its b-side Elle s'fait rougir toute seule were added, the former becoming the first song on the album and the latter becoming the last.

== Singles ==
- 1979 : Je fume pour oublier que tu bois / Bijou, bijou
- 1980 : Gaby oh Gaby / Elle s'fait rougir toute seule (France : 2)

== Certifications ==
Region	Certification	Certified units/sales
France (SNEP)	Gold	100,000^{*}
^{*} Sales figures based on certification alone.
