= Pizza (album) =

Studio album by Alain Bashung
- Released: 1981
- Studio: Rockfield Studios, Monmouth
- Genre: French rock, new wave
- Label: Philips, Barclay, Universal Music Group
- Producer: Alain Bashung, Ken Burgess

Alain Bashung chronology
Roulette russe (1979)	Pizza (1981)	Play blessures (1982)

Alternative cover
- Cover of CD reissue

Pizza is the third album by French rocker Alain Bashung, issued in 1981 on Philips Records.

== Production ==
This album immediately followed Bashung's breakthrough single, "Gaby oh Gaby" (which was added on the CD reissues of the album). Lyricist Boris Bergman wrote part of the lyrics, the other part was made of improvisations by Bashung. The album features a somewhat surreal mood, with abstract lyrics, full of double entendres, plays on words, puns and automatic writing. For instance, when talking about how a girl pisses him off on "Vertige de l'amour" ("Love vertigo"), his second hit single which helped bolster the sales of the album, Bergman wrote "Si ça continue j'vais me découper" ("if it goes on like this I'm gonna cut myself"), the verb "découper" (which means "cut") being used instead of "j'vais me casser" ("casser" both meaning "leave" and "break" in French), to which Bashung improvised "suivant les pointillés" ("along the dotted line").

== Reception ==
=== Commercial performance ===
Pizza hit #1 on the French charts.

=== Critical reception ===
In 2010, the French edition of Rolling Stone magazine named this album the 19th greatest French rock album (out of 100). In his book La discothèque parfaite de l'odyssée du rock, Gilles Verlant, although he did not include the album in his list of essential albums, qualified the album string of Roulette russe / Pizza as a "triumph".

== Track listing ==
No.	Title	Writer(s)	Length
1.	"Ça cache quekchose"	Boris Bergman - Alain Bashung	2:47
2.	"L'Araignée"	Boris Bergman - Alain Bashung	2:49
3.	"J'sors avec ma frangine"	Boris Bergman - Alain Bashung	2:48
4.	"Aficionado"	Boris Bergman - Alain Bashung	2:37
5.	"Idylle au Caire"	Boris Bergman - Alain Bashung	2:44
6.	"Privé"	Boris Bergman - Alain Bashung	3:07
7.	"Vertige de l'amour"	Boris Bergman - Alain Bashung	3:16
8.	"Rebel"	Boris Bergman - Alain Bashung	3:56
9.	"Retours"	Boris Bergman - Alain Bashung	2:12
10.	"Reviens va-t-en"	Boris Bergman - Alain Bashung	3:13
11.	"Fan"	Boris Bergman - Alain Bashung	4:19

=== Bonus Tracks (CD reissue) ===
No.	Title	Writer(s)	Length
12.	"Elle s'fait rougir toute seule"	Boris Bergman - Alain Bashung	3:08
13.	"Gaby oh Gaby"	Boris Bergman - Alain Bashung	3:58

== Personnel ==
- Alain Bashung - vocals
- Olivier Guindon, Richard Brunton - guitar
- François Delage - bass
- Tommy Eyre - keyboards
- Philippe Draï - drums
- Liam Genockey - percussion
- Mel Collins - saxophone

== Singles ==
- 1981 : Vertige de l'amour / Ça cache quekchose (France : 1)
- 1981 : Rebel / Reviens va-t-en (France : 19)

== Certifications ==
Region	Certification	Certified units/sales
France (SNEP)	Gold	100,000^{*}
^{*} Sales figures based on certification alone.
