= Jean-Baptiste Mondino =

French photographer and music video director (born 1949)

Jean-Baptiste Mondino (born 21 July 1949 in Aubervilliers) is a French fashion photographer and music video director. He has directed music videos for Madonna, David Bowie, Sting, Björk, Don Henley, Neneh Cherry, Jaye Muller (J./Count Jaye), Axel Bauer and Les Rita Mitsouko. Mondino has also photographed the covers and album packaging for Aṣa's Beautiful Imperfection (2010), the Marianne Faithfull albums Before The Poison (2005) and Easy Come, Easy Go (2008), Shakespear's Sister's Hormonally Yours (1992), Alain Bashung's Osez Joséphine (1991), Chatterton (1994), Mylène Farmer's Désobéissance (2018), J.'s We Are the Majority (1992) and Prince's Lovesexy (1988). He also designed the titles for the Anglo-French TV music show Rapido.

The video for Don Henley's "The Boys of Summer", which Mondino directed, swept the MTV Video Music Awards in 1985, winning "Best Video", "Best Direction", "Best Art Direction" and "Best Cinematography". This video paired him with compatriot cinematographer, Pascal Lebègue, with whom he would later shoot several other notable music videos in black and white, such as "Russians" for Sting and "Justify My Love" for Madonna.

Mondino's daughter Mahaut is a singer-songwriter and producer.

== Music video filmography ==
Film
Year	Title	Artist	Notes
1981	"Paradis"	Alain Chamfort	
1981	"Little Darlin'"	Sheila	
1983	"Quelqu'un comme toi"	Taxi Girl	
1983	"Soleil, soleil"	Ahmed Fakroun	
1983	"La danse des mots"	Mon Dino	aka Jean-Baptiste Mondino
1984	"Cargo"	Axel Bauer	
1984	"Un autre monde"	Téléphone	
1984	"The Boys of Summer"	Don Henley	Won Video of the Year, Best Direction, Best Art Direction, and Best Cinematography at the 1985 MTV Video Music Awards.
1985	"Slave to Love" & "Don't Stop the Dance"	Bryan Ferry	
1985	"Downtown Train"	Tom Waits	
1985	"Russians"	Sting	
1986	"Each Time You Break My Heart"	Nick Kamen	
1986	"Open Your Heart"	Madonna	
1986	"Wood Beez" (US Version)	Scritti Politti	
1987	"C'est comme ça"	Les Rita Mitsouko	
1987	"You Owe Me Some Kind of Love"	Chris Isaak	
1987	"Never Let Me Down"	David Bowie	
1987	"To Be Reborn"	Boy George	
1987	"Mia Bocca"	Jill Jones	
1988	"Qu'est-ce que t'es belle"	Catherine Ringer & Marc Lavoine	
1988	"I Wish U Heaven"	Prince	
1988	"How to Do That"	Jean-Paul Gaultier	
1989	"Be"	Lenny Kravitz	
1989	"Manchild"	Neneh Cherry	
1990	"I've Got You Under My Skin"	Neneh Cherry	
1990	"Justify My Love"	Madonna	
1990	"Tandem"	Vanessa Paradis	
1991	"Sorry About the Weather"	Mark Curry	
1991	"Osez Joséphine"	Alain Bashung	
1991	"Step On" (US Version)	Happy Mondays	
1992	"Volutes"	Alain Bashung	
1992	"Born on the Wrong Side of Town"	J. (Jaye Muller)	
1992	"Rhythm Is Love"	Keziah Jones	
1993	"L'ennemi dans la glace"	Alain Chamfort	
1993	"Buddy X"	Neneh Cherry	
1993	"Natural High"	Vanessa Paradis	
1994	"Ma petite entreprise"	Alain Bashung	
1994	"Violently Happy"	Björk	
1994	"If That's Your Boyfriend (He Wasn't Last Night)"	Meshell Ndegeocello	
1994	"Les amants"	Les Rita Mitsouko	
1994	"Séquelles"	MC Solaar	
1995	"Wonderful Shadow"	Tanita Tikaram	
1995	"Human Nature"	Madonna	
1996	"Love Don't Live Here Anymore"	Madonna	
1996	"Time"	China Moses	
1996	"Kootchi"	Neneh Cherry	
1998	"Tout le monde"	Zazie	
2000	"Naive Song"	Mirwais Ahmadzaï	
2000	"Don't Tell Me"	Madonna	Nominated for Grammy Award for Best Music Video. Two nominations at 2001 MTV Video Music Awards.
2003	"Hollywood"	Madonna	
2007	"Sing Sing"	Ultra Orange & Emmanuelle	
2007	"The Operation"	Charlotte Gainsbourg	
2008	"Beauty Mark"	Charlotte Gainsbourg	
2008	"Dancin' Til Dawn"	Lenny Kravitz	
2008	"Sur un trapèze"	Alain Bashung	
2013	"L'amour naissant"	Sébastien Tellier	
2014	"Everything"	Neneh Cherry	
2014	"The Great Elements"	Mahaut	
2015	"The Long Game"	Mahaut	
2015	"Lie to Me"	Mahaut	
2015	"In Love with a Boy"	Kaya Stewart	
2017	"Miss You"	Carla Bruni	

== See also ==
- Fashion
- Fashion on the Internet
