= Novice (album) =

Studio album by Alain Bashung
- Released: 1989
- Recorded: ICP Studio, Brussels
- Genre: French rock; post-punk; alternative rock
- Label: Barclay; Universal Music Group
- Producer: Nick Patrick

Alain Bashung chronology
Passé le Rio Grande (1986)	Novice (1989)	Osez Joséphine (1991)

Novice is the seventh studio album by French rocker Alain Bashung, issued in 1989 on Barclay Records.

== Production ==
The songwriting is split between Boris Bergman, marking is last collaboration with Bashung, and Jean Fauque who would go on to write his four subsequent albums. Bashung said about the album that it was a sequel of sort to his experiments on Play blessures. The album has a dark sound, and did not sell very well. One of the songs, "By Proxy", is one of the very few originals written entirely in English by Bashung.

The song "Alcaline" is a pun on French pop singer Christophe's song "Aline". In 2011, Christophe covered the song for the tribute album Tels Alain Bashung.

== Critical reception ==
In a review that was featured in the compilation OpticalSound 3, one reviewer praised Novice as the only Bashung album other than Play blessures that they enjoyed all the way through. Academic Jean Frédéric Hennuy compared the lyrics of "Pyromanes" and "Légère éclaircie" with those of Nick Cave.

== Track listing ==
No.	Title	Writer(s)	Length
1.	"Pyromanes"	Boris Bergman - Alain Bashung	3:58
2.	"Résidences"	Boris Bergman - Alain Bashung	3:34
3.	"Légère éclaircie"	Boris Bergman - Alain Bashung	4:20
4.	"Alcaline"	Boris Bergman - Alain Bashung	5:00
5.	"Tu m'as jeté"	Jean Fauque - Alain Bashung	4:31
6.	"Elle fait l'avion"	Boris Bergman - Alain Bashung	4:47
7.	"Bombez !"	Jean Fauque - Alain Bashung	3:02
8.	"Intrépide malgré la fièvre"	Boris Bergman - Alain Bashung	4:01
9.	"Étrange été"	Jean Fauque - Alain Bashung	3:33
10.	"Outrage" (instrumental)	Alain Bashung - Jean Fauque	0:36
11.	"By Proxy"	Boris Bergman - P. Ives - Alain Bashung	3:49

=== Bonus Track (1993 CD reissue) ===
No.	Title	Writer(s)	Length
12.	"Bombez!" (Version 1992)	Jean Fauque - Alain Bashung	3:04
13.	"Climax 4" (instrumental)	Alain Bashung - André Georget	4:24

== Personnel ==
=== Musicians ===
- Olivier Guindon - guitars
- Vic Emerson - keyboards
- Colin Newman - keyboards
- Philippe Draï - drums
- Dave Ball - keyboards
- Jean-Marie Aerts - guitars
- Blixa Bargeld - guitars
- Phil Manzanera - guitars
- Simon Rogers - guitars
- Mick Parker - guitars

=== Production ===
- Realisation: Nick Patrick
- Mixing: Jean Trenchant and Nick Patrick
- Remix 1992 (12-13): Djoum
- Photographs: T.Rajic
- Graphism: Antonietti, Pascault & Associés
- Graphism: Huart/Cholley
- Editions: 1,2,3,4,6,8,11 & 12 Polygram Music/Pitchi-Poï; 5,7,9 & 10 Polygram Music
