= Gingsheim =

Gingsheim Gíngse
- Part of Wingersheim-les-Quatre-Bans
- Coat of arms
- Location of Gingsheim
- Location within France Location within Grand Est
- Coordinates: 48°43′03″N 7°35′23″E
- Country: France
- Region: Grand Est
- Department: Bas-Rhin
- Arrondissement: Saverne
- Canton: Bouxwiller
- Commune: Wingersheim-les-Quatre-Bans
- Area^{1}: 3.71 km^{2} (1.43 sq mi)
- Highest elevation: 264 m (866 ft)
- Lowest elevation: 172 m (564 ft)
- Population (2021): 356
  - Density: 96.0/km^{2} (249/sq mi)
- Time zone: UTC+01:00 (CET)
  - Summer (DST): UTC+02:00 (CEST)
- Postal code: 67270
- ^{1} French Land Register data, which excludes lakes, ponds, glaciers > 1 km^{2} (0.386 sq mi or 247 acres) and river estuaries.

Gingsheim (French pronunciation: [ɡiŋsaim]; Alsatian: Gìngse) is a former commune in the Bas-Rhin department in north-eastern France. On 1 January 2016, it was merged into the new commune Wingersheim-les-Quatre-Bans.

== Geography ==
Gingsheim is positioned between Duntzenheim to the east and Hohatzenheim to the west.

The countryside is gently hilly and is used for agriculture

== Population ==
Historical population
Year	Pop.	±% p.a.
2006	317	—
2011	319	+0.13%
2021	356	+1.10%
Source: INSEE

== Points of interest ==
Altar-piece: Oil painting (1897) of St Nicholas by Carola Sorg.

== See also ==
- Communes of the Bas-Rhin department
