= Dimanches à l'Élysée =

Live album by Alain Bashung
- Released: 16 November 2009
- Recorded: Essentially on 14 December 2008 at the Élysée Montmartre (Paris)
- Genres: French rock, Alternative rock
- Labels: Barclay Records, Universal Music Group
- Producer: Gérard Michel

Alain Bashung chronology
Bleu pétrole (2008)	Dimanches à l'Élysée (2009)	L'Homme à tête de chou (2011)

Dimanches à l'Élysée (Sundays at the Élysée) is the fifth live album by Alain Bashung, issued posthumously in November 2009 on Barclay Records. It documents the 2008-2009 tour which followed the album Bleu pétrole.

== Production ==
Dimanches à l'Élysée documents the tour that Alain Bashung did in 2008-2009 while fighting with the cancer that led to his death on 14 March 2009. The album features most of the songs from Bleu pétrole, with around fifteen more songs showcasing his career.

The album was mostly recorded on 14 December 2008 at the Élysée Montmartre in Paris.

== Track listing ==
CD 1
No.	Title	Length
1.	"Comme un lego"	9:45
2.	"Je t'ai manqué"	3:40
3.	"Hier à Sousse"	3:39
4.	"Volontaire"	2:58
5.	"Mes prisons"	3:42
6.	"Samuel Hall"	5:50
7.	"Vénus"	4:01
8.	"La nuit je mens"	4:55
9.	"Je tuerai la pianiste"	4:42
10.	"Légère éclaircie"	5:18
11.	"Mes bras"	5:30

CD 2
No.	Title	Length
1.	"À perte de vue"	7:05
2.	"Happe"	3:24
3.	"J'passe pour une caravane"	3:39
4.	"Everybody's Talkin'"	3:09
5.	"Osez Joséphine"	3:56
6.	"Fantaisie militaire"	5:51
7.	"Madame rêve"	6:21
8.	"To Bill (duet with Chloé Mons)"	4:27
9.	"Vertige de l'amour"	3:24
10.	"Malaxe"	8:30
11.	"Angora"	2:40
12.	"Nights in White Satin"	4:23

== Personnel ==
=== Musicians ===
- Bobby Jocky - bass guitar
- Arnaud Dieterlen - drums
- Yan Péchin - guitar
- Jeff Assy - cello
