= L'Homme à tête de chou (Alain Bashung album) =

Studio album by Alain Bashung
- Released: 7 November 2011
- Genre: French rock, Alternative rock, Chanson
- Label: Barclay Records, Universal Music Group

Alain Bashung chronology
Dimanches à l'Élysée (2009)	L'Homme à tête de chou (2011)	En amont (2018)

L'Homme à tête de chou (The cabbage-headed man) is the first posthumous studio album by Alain Bashung, issued in November 2011. It is a track-by-track rerecording of the album of the same name by Serge Gainsbourg, originally recorded as the soundtrack to a dance show by Jean-Claude Gallotta.

== Track listing ==
No.	Title	Writer(s)	Length
1.	"L'Homme à tête de chou"	Serge Gainsbourg	2:42
2.	"Chez Max coiffeur pour hommes"	Gainsbourg	1:12
3.	"Marilou Reggae"	Gainsbourg	2:35
4.	"Transit à Marilou"	Gainsbourg	1:31
5.	"Flash Forward"	Gainsbourg	2:18
6.	"Aéroplanes"	Gainsbourg	2:09
7.	"Premiers symptômes"	Gainsbourg	2:25
8.	"Ma Lou Marilou"	Gainsbourg	3:06
9.	"Variations sur Marilou"	Gainsbourg	8:59
10.	"Meurtre à l'extincteur"	Gainsbourg	3:16
11.	"Marilou sous la neige"	Gainsbourg	2:38
12.	"Lunatic Asylum"	Gainsbourg	3:21

== Personnel ==
=== Musicians ===
- Alain Bashung - Vocals
- Denis Clavaizolle - Orchestration, arrangements, piano, keyboards, programmations, guitars, bass guitars
- Jean Lamoot - Programmations
- Éric Truffaz - Trumpet
- Frédéric Havet - Guitar
- Pierre Valéry Lobé, Mamadou Koné - Percussions
- Yann Clavaizolle - Drums
- Aurélie Chenille - Violin
- Guillaume Bongiraud - Cello
- Morgane Imbeaud - Background vocals

=== Production ===
- element-s, Jérôme Witz: Drawings, graphism
- Guy Delahaye, Marie Fonte, Yannick Hugron, Sylvain Decloitre, Loriane Wagner, Béatrice Warrand, Thierry Verger, Bernard Leloup: Photos

=== Show ===
- Jean-Claude Gallotta: Choreography
- Jean-Marc Ghanassia: Choreography production
- Flam: Executive production
- With support from the Centre Chorégraphique de Grenoble.
