= Réservé aux indiens =

Compilation album by Alain Bashung
- Released: 1992
- Genres: French rock, Alternative rock
- Labels: Barclay Records, Universal Music Group

Alain Bashung chronology
Tour Novice (1992)	Réservé aux indiens (1992)	Chatterton (1994)

Réservé aux indiens (Only Indians allowed) is a compilation of unreleased songs by French rocker Alain Bashung, issued in early 1993 on Barclay Records as part of the reissues of Bashung material on CD format. It contains 12 titles: 3 unreleased studio songs (including a cover), 6 instrumentals, 2 songs from original soundtracks and 1 traditional German song.

== Track listing ==
No.	Title	Writer(s)	Length
1.	"Climax 4 (instrumental)"	Alain Bashung / André Georget
2.	"La Peur des mots (instrumental)"	Jean Fauque / Alain Bashung
3.	"Not Tonight Joséphine (instrumental)"	Alain Bashung
4.	"Les lendemains qui tuent (from the original soundtrack to Les lendemains qui tuent by Daniel Duval) (1990)"	Alain Bashung / Jean Fauque - Alain Bashung
5.	"Inside Dope"	Boris Bergman - Alain Bashung
6.	"Feu"	Alain Bashung / Jean Fauque - Alain Bashung
7.	"Beaujolais novo (globo) (from the original soundtrack to Nestor Burma by Jean-Luc Miesch) (1984)"	Boris Bergman - Alain Bashung
8.	"That's All Right Mama (recorded at Sun Records studio in Memphis for Glamour magazine) (1989)"	Arthur Crudup
9.	"Stille Nacht (recorded for Embûche de Noël, a special of the show Les Enfants du rock) (1983)"	Traditional
10.	"La Coupole (instrumental)"	Alain Bashung
11.	"Métamorphose (instrumental)"	Alain Bashung
12.	"Climax 3 (instrumental)"	Alain Bashung / André Georget
