= Wingersheim =

Former commune in Bas-Rhin, France

- Part of Wingersheim-les-Quatre-Bans
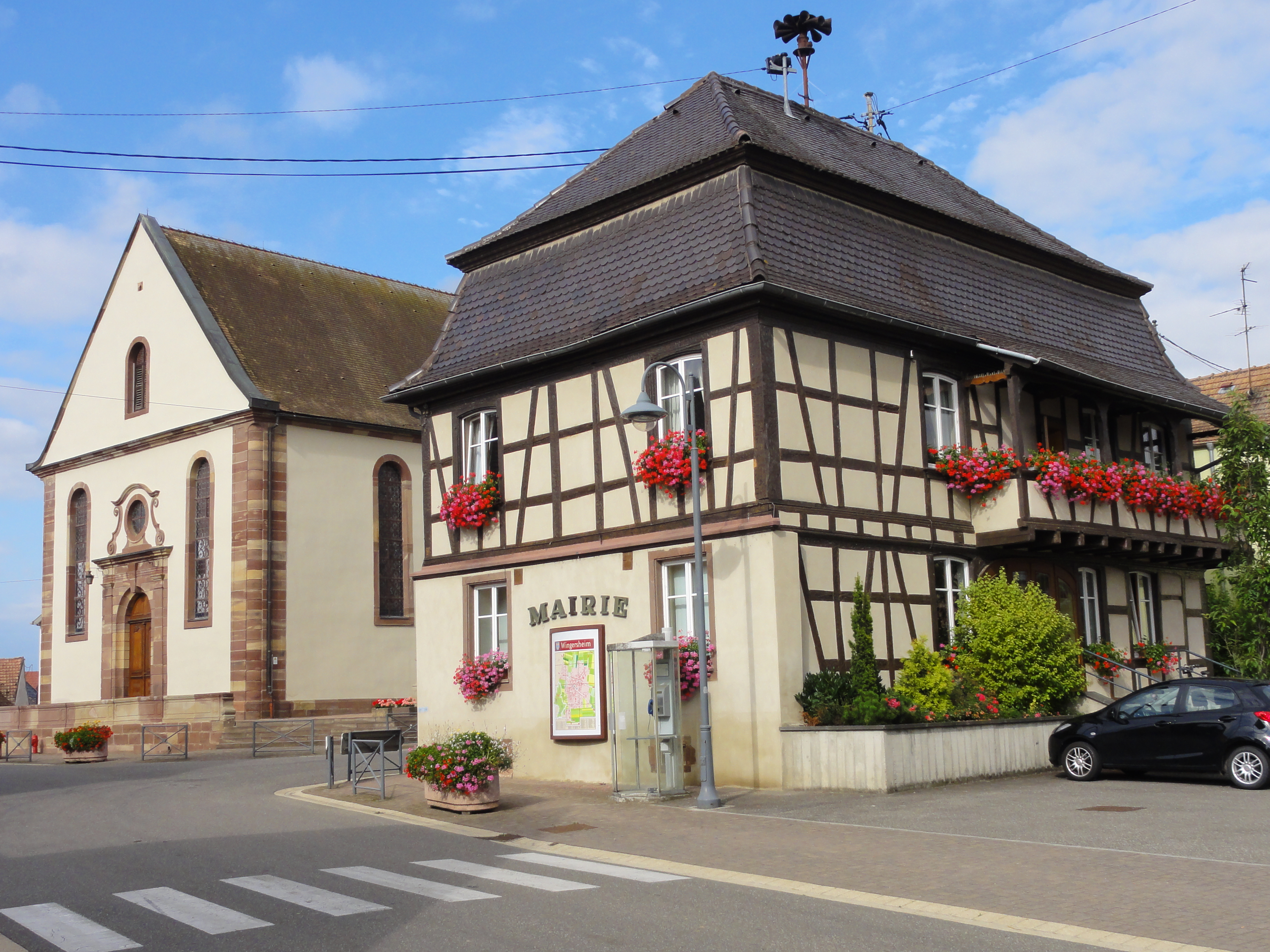
- Town hall

- Coat of arms
- Location of Wingersheim
- Location within France Location within Grand Est
- Coordinates: 48°43′23″N 7°38′12″E
- Country: France
- Region: Grand Est
- Department: Bas-Rhin
- Arrondissement: Saverne
- Canton: Bouxwiller
- Commune: Wingersheim-les-Quatre-Bans
- Area^{1}: 8 km^{2} (3.1 sq mi)
- Highest elevation: 256 m (840 ft)
- Lowest elevation: 144 m (472 ft)
- Population (2021): 1,140
  - Density: 140/km^{2} (370/sq mi)
- Time zone: UTC+01:00 (CET)
  - Summer (DST): UTC+02:00 (CEST)
- Postal code: 67170
- ^{1} French Land Register data, which excludes lakes, ponds, glaciers > 1 km^{2} (0.386 sq mi or 247 acres) and river estuaries.

Wingersheim (French pronunciation: [viŋ(ɡ)ərsaim]; Alsatian: Wìngersche) is a former commune in the Bas-Rhin department in north-eastern France. On 1 January 2016, it was merged into the new commune of Wingersheim-les-Quatre-Bans.

== Geography ==
Wingersheim lies on the Alsace plain, at the north-eastern edge of the Kochersberg, approximately 23 kilometres (14 mi) north-west of Strasbourg.

=== Hydrography ===
The northern part of the former commune is crossed by the Marne–Rhine Canal and the Zorn.

== History ==
The earliest known written reference to the village is from 1120, when its name was recorded as Winegresheim. Wingersheim was historically associated with viticulture. In 1257, Pope Alexander IV confirmed Hohenburg Abbey's ownership of vineyards in Wingersheim. Following the First World War, the local vineyards declined, and the village subsequently became an important centre of hop cultivation.

== Landmarks ==
The Church of Saint Nicholas retains a medieval tower probably dating from the 13th or 14th century. The nave and chancel were rebuilt in 1768, with the earlier tower retained and converted into a sacristy. The church was blessed in 1768, consecrated in 1781, and listed as a French monument historique in 1984.

The church contains an organ installed in 1782 by the Lorraine organ builder Nicolas Tollay. It is the only organ built by Tollay known to survive in Alsace.

The former synagogue was built in 1875, replacing an earlier synagogue.

The village's Hop Discovery Trail is a marked 4.5-kilometre (2.8 mi) walking route through the surrounding hop fields. It passes the Holy Year Cross, erected in 1950 and restored in 2009, on the Reinhardsberg above the village.

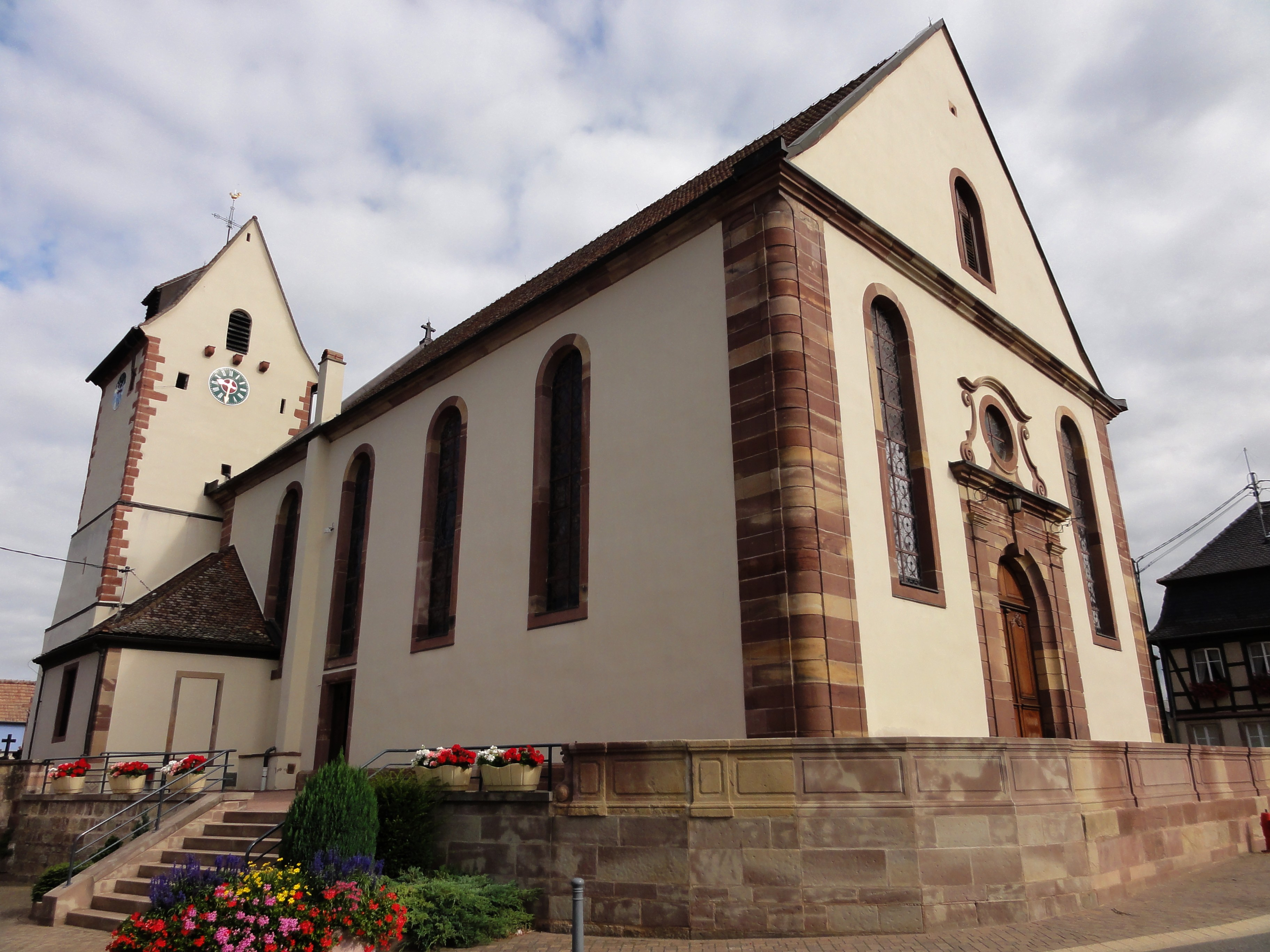
Church of Saint Nicholas

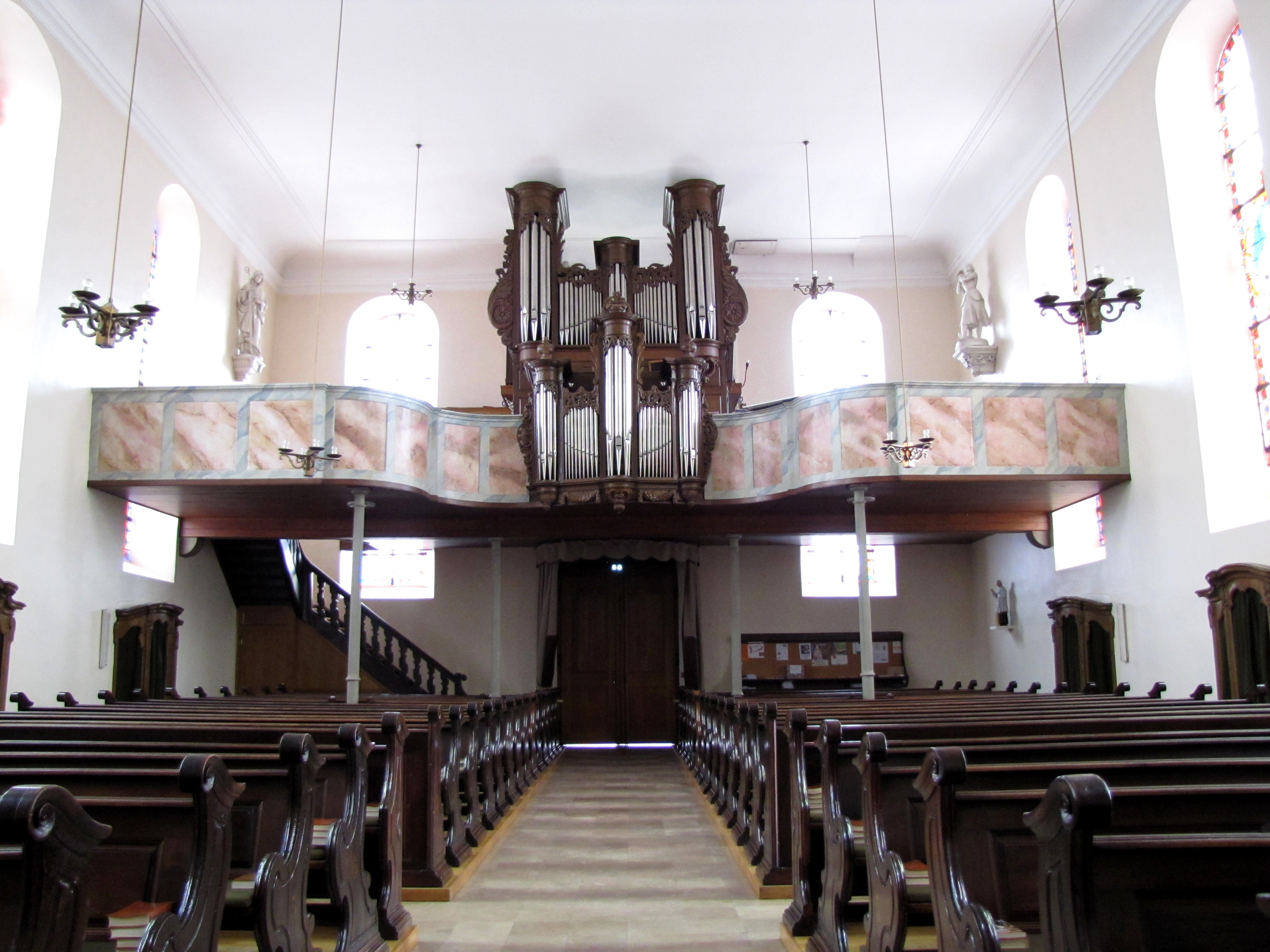
Interior of the nave, looking towards the gallery housing the Tollay organ (1782)

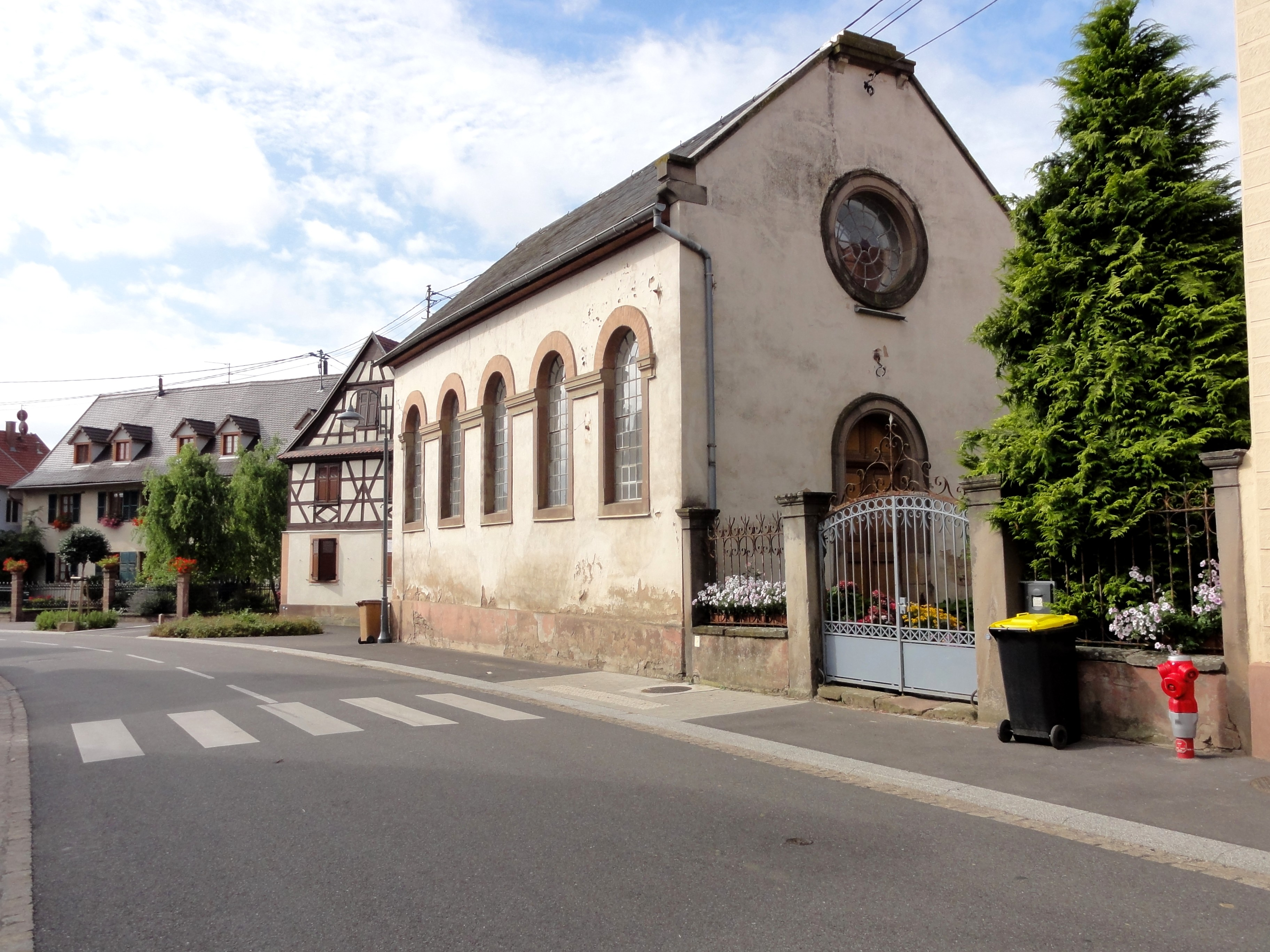
Former synagogue (1875)

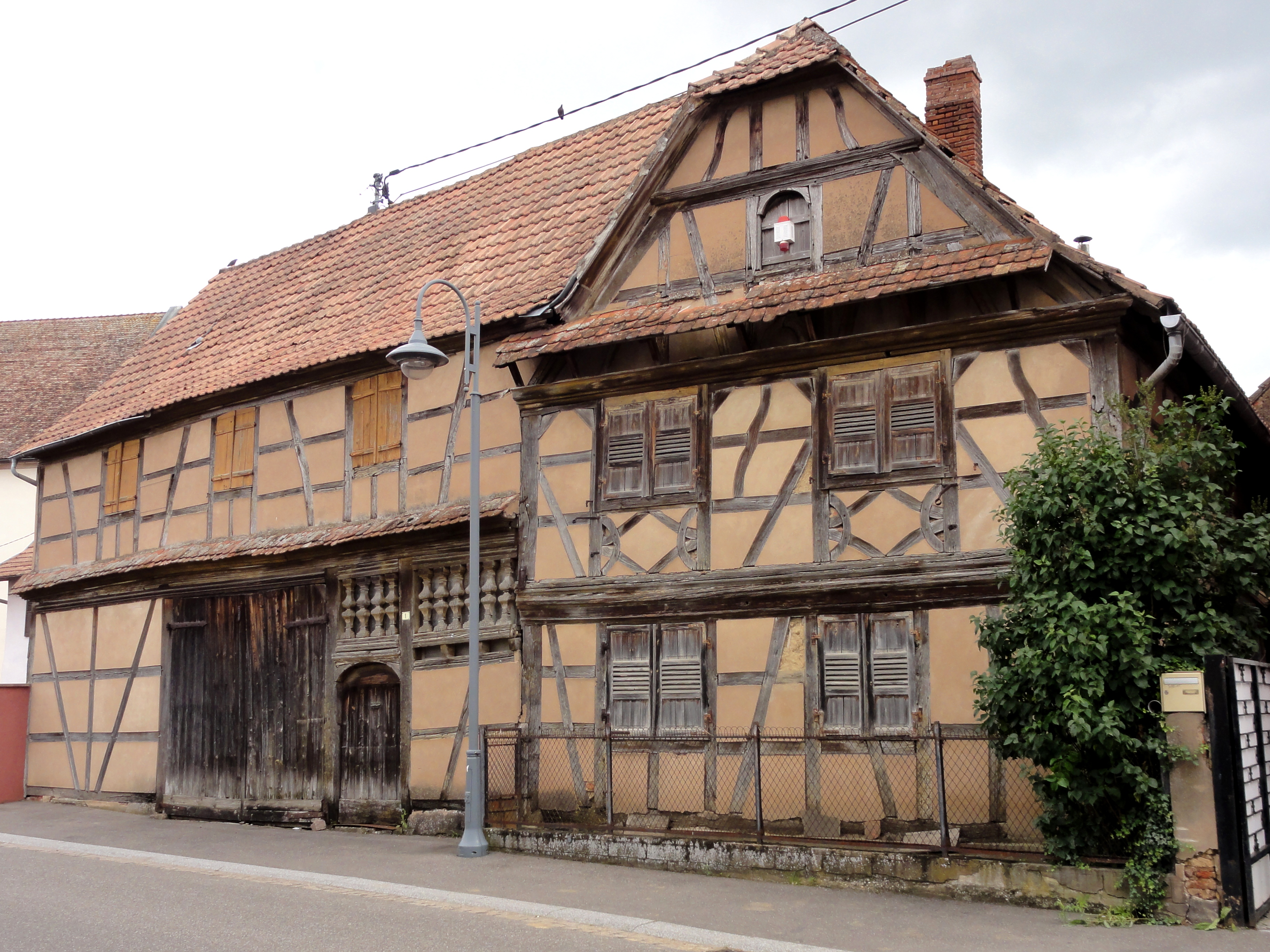
Farmhouse (18th century), 1 rue de la Victoire

== Notable people ==
- Alain Bashung (1947–2009), singer, songwriter and actor, spent much of his childhood in Wingersheim, where he was raised by his adoptive paternal grandmother.

== Population ==
Historical population
| Year | Pop. | ±% p.a. |
|---|---|---|
| 2006 | 1,126 | — |
| 2011 | 1,189 | +1.09% |
| 2021 | 1,140 | −0.42% |
Source: INSEE

== See also ==
- Communes of the Bas-Rhin department
