= Live Tour 85 =

Album by Alain Bashung

Live album by Alain Bashung
- Released: 1985
- Recorded: April 1985 at the Maison de la Culture André Malraux in Reims, at the Théâtre André Malraux in Rueil-Malmaison, at the Théâtre Rutebeuf in Clichy, at the studio d'Aguesseau (Hey Joe); mixed at the ICP Studios in Brussels (tracks 1 to 11) and the Trident Studios in London (tracks 12 to 15)
- Genre: French rock, new wave
- Label: Philips Records, Barclay Records, Universal Music Group
- Producer: Nick Patrick

Alain Bashung chronology
Figure imposée (1983)	Live Tour 85 (1985)	Passé le Rio Grande (1986)

Live Tour 85 is the first live album by French rocker Alain Bashung, issued in 1985 on Philips Records.

== Production ==
The album was first issued as a single vinyl album, but was quickly rereleased as a double album at Bashung's request (with a studio cover of "Hey Joe" added at the end).

== Reception ==
=== Critical reception ===
In 2010, the French edition of Rolling Stone magazine named this album the 16th greatest French rock album (out of 100).

== Track listing ==
No.	Title	Writer(s)	Length
1.	"Imbécile"	Boris Bergman - Alain Bashung	5:09
2.	"Martine boude"	Serge Gainsbourg / Alain Bashung - Alain Bashung	3:10
3.	"Toujours sur la ligne blanche"	Boris Bergman - Alain Bashung	6:08
4.	"Vertige de l'amour"	Boris Bergman - Alain Bashung	3:17
5.	"S.O.S. Amor"	Didier Golemanas / Alain Bashung - Alain Bashung	3:42
6.	"What's in a Bird"	Pascal Jacquemin / Alain Bashung - Alain Bashung	3:53
7.	"Bijou, bijou"	Boris Bergman / Daniel Tardieu - Alain Bashung	5:56
8.	"Gaby oh Gaby"	Boris Bergman - Alain Bashung	5:02
9.	"Je fume pour oublier que tu bois"	Boris Bergman - Alain Bashung	6:17
10.	"Les Petits Enfants"	Daniel Tardieu - Alain Bashung	1:04
11.	"Junge Männer"	Boris Bergman - Alain Bashung	9:19
12.	"Volontaire"	Serge Gainsbourg / Alain Bashung - Alain Bashung	4:02
13.	"Fan"	Boris Bergman - Alain Bashung	4:09
14.	"Ça cache quekchose"	Boris Bergman - Alain Bashung	3:37
15.	"Hey Joe"	Billy Roberts (adapt. Gilles Thibault) / recorded by Gilbert Courtois	4:57

== Personnel ==
- Alain Bashung - vocals, guitar
- Frantz Delage - bass guitar
- Philippe Draï - drums, drum machine
- Oli Guindon - guitar
- Richard Mortier - rhythm guitar
- Christian Tourines - synthesizers, saxophone
- Paul Personne - guitar (5)

Technical

- S. Van Poucke - graphs back cover & photos
- Huart/Cholley - graphs
- Nick Patrick - production, mixing
- Christian Ramon - mixing (1 to 11)
- Clive Martin - mixing (12 to 15)
