= Confessions publiques =

Live album by Alain Bashung
- Released: 1995
- Genre: French rock, Alternative rock
- Label: Barclay Records, Universal Music Group

Alain Bashung chronology
Chatterton (1994)	Confessions publiques (1995)	Fantaisie militaire (1998)

Confessions publiques (Public confessions) is the third live album by French rocker Alain Bashung, issued in 1995 on Barclay Records. A live video album of the same name, recorded on the 3rd and 4 October 1995 at the Chabada in Angers was also released on VHS and DVD on PolyGram Video.

== Reception ==
French magazine Les Inrocks wrote positively about the album, claiming that it's "a live album on which the songs loosen their ties and take back their freedom", and conclude that the album is an "elegant stopgap in a sometimes wind-broken discography".

== Track listing ==
CD 1
No.	Title	Writer(s)	Length
1.	"Les Grands Voyageurs"	Laurent Petitgand / Jean Fauque - Alain Bashung	4:14
2.	"Un âne plane"	Alain Bashung / Jean Fauque - Alain Bashung	3:24
3.	"À Ostende"	Alain Bashung / Jean Fauque - Alain Bashung	4:26
4.	"Elvire"	Alain Bashung / Jean Fauque - Alain Bashung	4:55
5.	"J'écume"	Alain Bashung / Jean Fauque - Alain Bashung	3:50
6.	"Osez Joséphine"	Alain Bashung / Jean Fauque - Alain Bashung	3:24
7.	"À perte de vue"	Alain Bashung / Jean Fauque - Alain Bashung	5:07
8.	"Étrange été"	Jean Fauque - Alain Bashung	4:28
9.	"Les lendemains qui tuent"	Alain Bashung / Jean Fauque - Alain Bashung	2:34
10.	"J'avais un pense-bête"	Alain Bashung / Jean Fauque - Alain Bashung	4:51
11.	"Les Petits Enfants"	Daniel Tardieu - Alain Bashung	0:49
12.	"Martine boude"	Alain Bashung / Serge Gainsbourg - Alain Bashung	4:21
13.	"Bombez !"	Jean Fauque - Alain Bashung	3:10
14.	"L'Apiculteur"	Alain Bashung / Jean Fauque - Alain Bashung	7:47

CD 2
No.	Title	Writer(s)	Length
1.	"Volutes"	Alain Bashung / Jean Fauque - Alain Bashung	3:40
2.	"Danse d'ici"	Alain Bashung / Jean Fauque - Alain Bashung	4:44
3.	"Après d'âpres hostilités"	Alain Bashung / Jean Fauque - Alain Bashung	4:14
4.	"Vertige de l'amour"	Boris Bergman - Alain Bashung	3:00
5.	"Ma petite entreprise"	Alain Bashung / Jean Fauque - Alain Bashung	4:04
6.	"Madame rêve"	Pierre Grillet - Alain Bashung	5:13
7.	"Happe"	Alain Bashung / Jean Fauque - Alain Bashung	3:08
8.	"J'passe pour une caravane"	Alain Bashung / Jean Fauque - Alain Bashung	3:26
9.	"Gaby oh Gaby"	Boris Bergman - Alain Bashung	3:55
10.	"Rebel"	Boris Bergman - Alain Bashung	4:10
11.	"Toujours sur la ligne blanche"	Boris Bergman - Alain Bashung	4:48
12.	"Bijou, bijou"	Daniel Tardieu / Boris Bergman - Alain Bashung	5:54
