= Bert Bertrand =

Belgian journalist

Bert Bertrand was a journalist from Belgium. He was the son of the cartoonist Yvan Delporte. He played a major role in the early days of punk rock in Belgium. In 1983, he committed suicide. He may also have been the one to be responsible for the name Plastic Bertrand..

== Work ==
- Press
  - More
  - En Attendant
  - Le Trombone Illustré
- Music
  - Songwriter and singer for The Bowling Balls
