= Fantaisie militaire =

Studio album by Alain Bashung
- Released: 6 January 1998
- Recorded: Studio Miraval; Studio Davout (strings); Studio Pierce Entertainment (mixing)
- Genres: French rock, alternative rock
- Length: 50:38
- Labels: Barclay Records, Universal Music Group
- Producer: Ian Caple

Alain Bashung chronology
| Confessions publiques (1995) | Fantaisie militaire (1998) | L'Imprudence (2002) |

Singles from Fantaisie militaire
- 1. "La nuit je mens" Released: February 1998; 2. "Sommes-nous" Released: 1998

Fantaisie militaire (Military fantasy) is the tenth studio album by the French rock musician Alain Bashung, released in January 1998 by Barclay Records.

== Production ==
For this album, Bashung worked with the English record producer and engineer Ian Caple and with artists such as the Valentins, Rodolphe Burger, Joseph Racaille and Adrian Utley of Portishead. Most of the songs were written by Jean Fauque.

The song "Samuel Hall" is a drum and bass reworking of the folk song "Sam Hall".

== Reception ==
=== Commercial performance ===
The album reached #1 on the French charts. It is one of Bashung's greatest successes, helped by the successful single "La nuit je mens".

=== Critical reception ===
Professional ratings
Review scores
| Source | Rating |
|---|---|
| Allmusic | 4.5/5 stars |

Fantaisie militaire marked a turn in Bashung's career. He was awarded three Victoires de la musique awards in 1999: Male Artist of the Year, Best Album of the Year, and Video of the Year for the single "La nuit je mens". In 2005, the Victoires ranked it the best French album since 1985. The Belgian rock historian Gilles Verlant included the album in his book La discothèque parfaite de l'odyssée du rock, lauding it as a "chef d'œuvre" and the "shining diamond of the winter of 1998". He added that the album showed "Bashung mix the sounds and his inspiration with a perfect mastery of studio incidents" and that "its precision is that of a goldsmith, a jeweler, a maniac watchmaker". In 2010, the French edition of Rolling Stone magazine named Fantaisie militaire the ninth greatest French rock album ever made.

== Track listing ==
| No. | Title | Writer(s) | Length |
|---|---|---|---|
| 1. | "Malaxe" | Alain Bashung / Jean Fauque – Alain Bashung / Les Valentins | 4:33 |
| 2. | "La nuit je mens" | Alain Bashung / Jean Fauque – Alain Bashung / Les Valentins | 4:25 |
| 3. | "Fantaisie militaire" | Alain Bashung / Jean Fauque – Alain Bashung | 4:48 |
| 4. | "2043" | Alain Bashung / Jean Fauque – Alain Bashung | 3:45 |
| 5. | "Mes prisons" | Alain Bashung / Jean Fauque – Alain Bashung | 4:07 |
| 6. | "Ode à la vie" | Alain Bashung / Jean Fauque – Alain Bashung / Jean-Marc Lederman | 4:16 |
| 7. | "Dehors" | Alain Bashung / Jean Fauque – Alain Bashung / Les Valentins | 3:29 |
| 8. | "Samuel Hall" | Olivier Cadiot / Rodolphe Burger | 5:05 |
| 9. | "Aucun express" | Alain Bashung / Jean Fauque – Alain Bashung | 4:05 |
| 10. | "Au pavillon des lauriers" | Alain Bashung / Jean Fauque – Alain Bashung | 4:43 |
| 11. | "Sommes-nous" | Alain Bashung / Jean Fauque – Alain Bashung | 3:56 |
| 12. | "Angora" | Alain Bashung / Jean Fauque – Alain Bashung | 2:07 |

== Personnel ==
=== Musicians ===
- Alain Bashung - vocals
- Édith Fambuena - electric guitar, acoustic guitar, bass guitar (8), programming
- Jean-Louis Pierot - synthesizers, Hammond organ, harpsichord, Leslie piano, vibraphone, piano, programming
- Martyn Barker - drums, Turc and African percussion
- Simon Edwards - electric bass guitar, sentir, percussions, harpsichord
- Adrian Utley - electric guitars
- Rodolphe Burger - guitars (8), programming (8)
- Joseph Racaille string arrangements
- Alhambra - string ensemble
- Virginie Michaud musical direction

=== Production ===
- Ian Caple: producer, engineer, programming and mixing
- Jean Lamoot: assistant sound engineer, Pro Tools assistant, preproduction direction, programming, recording
- Anne Lamy: executive production
- Pascale Jaupard: management

== Charts ==
=== Weekly charts ===
| Chart (1998) | Peak position |
|---|---|
| Belgian Albums (Ultratop Wallonia) | 15 |
| French Albums (SNEP) | 1 |

=== Year-end charts ===
| Chart (1998) | Position |
|---|---|
| Belgian Albums (Ultratop Wallonia) | 71 |
| French Albums (SNEP) | 28 |

== Certifications ==
| Region | Certification | Certified units/sales |
|---|---|---|
| France (SNEP) | Platinum | 300,000^{*} |
^{*} Sales figures based on certification alone.
