= Mittelhausen, Bas-Rhin =

Mittelhausen Míttelhüse
- Part of Wingersheim-les-Quatre-Bans
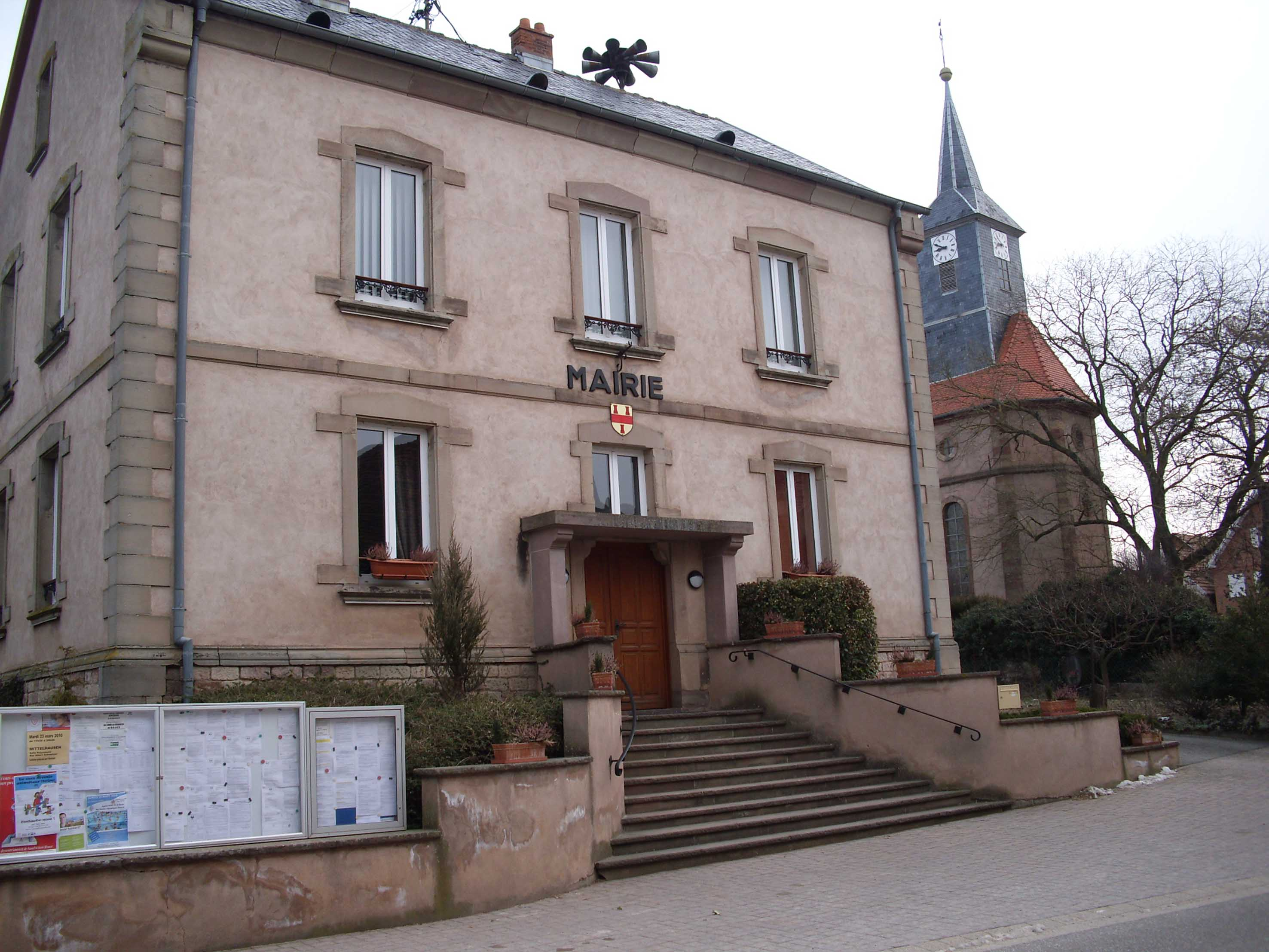
- Town hall

- Coat of arms
- Location of Mittelhausen
- Location within France Location within Grand Est
- Coordinates: 48°42′36″N 7°37′53″E
- Country: France
- Region: Grand Est
- Department: Bas-Rhin
- Arrondissement: Saverne
- Canton: Bouxwiller
- Commune: Wingersheim-les-Quatre-Bans
- Area^{1}: 4.81 km^{2} (1.86 sq mi)
- Highest elevation: 240 m (790 ft)
- Lowest elevation: 172 m (564 ft)
- Population (2021): 601
  - Density: 125/km^{2} (324/sq mi)
- Time zone: UTC+01:00 (CET)
  - Summer (DST): UTC+02:00 (CEST)
- Postal code: 67170
- ^{1} French Land Register data, which excludes lakes, ponds, glaciers > 1 km^{2} (0.386 sq mi or 247 acres) and river estuaries.

Mittelhausen (French pronunciation: [mitəlauzən]; Alsatian: Mìttelhüse) is a former commune in the Bas-Rhin department in north-eastern France. On 1 January 2016, it was merged into the new commune Wingersheim-les-Quatre-Bans.

== Population ==
Historical population
| Year | Pop. | ±% p.a. |
|---|---|---|
| 2006 | 550 | — |
| 2011 | 547 | −0.11% |
| 2021 | 601 | +0.95% |
Source: INSEE

== See also ==
- Communes of the Bas-Rhin department
