= Wingersheim-les-Quatre-Bans =

- Commune
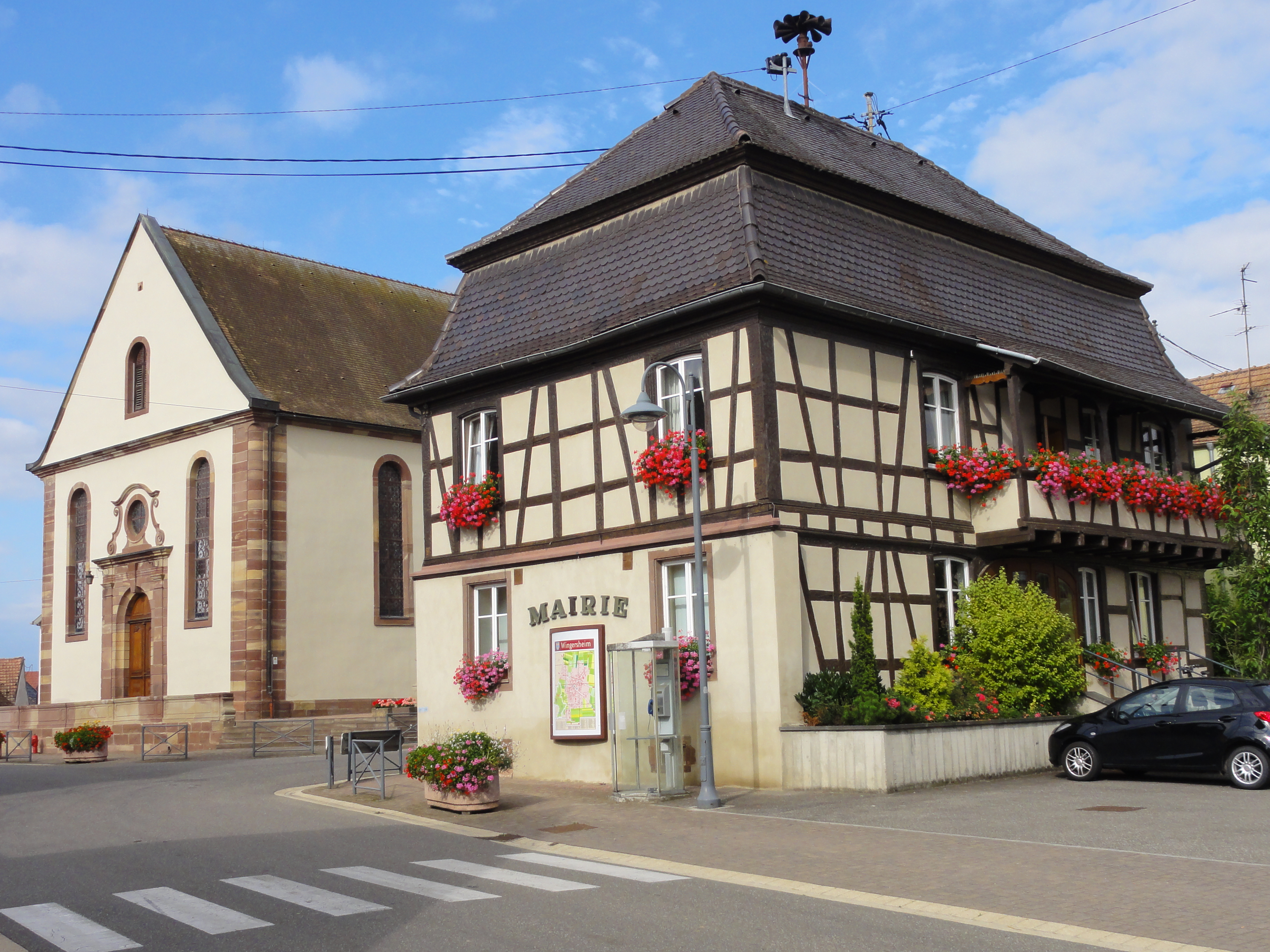
- The town hall in Wingersheim-les-Quatre-Bans
- Location of Wingersheim-les-Quatre-Bans
- Location within France Location within Grand Est
- Coordinates: 48°43′19″N 7°38′10″E
- Country: France
- Region: Grand Est
- Department: Bas-Rhin
- Arrondissement: Saverne
- Canton: Bouxwiller
- Intercommunality: Pays de la Zorn

Government
  - Mayor (2020–2026): Bernard Freund
- Area^{1}: 18.52 km^{2} (7.15 sq mi)
- Population (2023): 2,342
  - Density: 126.5/km^{2} (327.5/sq mi)
- Time zone: UTC+01:00 (CET)
  - Summer (DST): UTC+02:00 (CEST)
- INSEE/Postal code: 67539 /67170, 67270
- ^{1} French Land Register data, which excludes lakes, ponds, glaciers > 1 km^{2} (0.386 sq mi or 247 acres) and river estuaries.

Wingersheim-les-Quatre-Bans is a commune in the Bas-Rhin department of northeastern France. The municipality was established on 1 January 2016 and consists of the former communes of Gingsheim, Hohatzenheim, Mittelhausen and Wingersheim.

== Population ==
Population data refer to the area corresponding with the commune as of January 2025.

Historical population
Year	Pop.	±% p.a.
1968	1,631	—
1975	1,652	+0.18%
1982	1,903	+2.04%
1990	1,958	+0.36%
1999	2,096	+0.76%
2007	2,226	+0.76%
2012	2,263	+0.33%
2017	2,292	+0.25%
2023	2,342	+0.36%
Source: INSEE

== See also ==
- Communes of the Bas-Rhin department
