= More (Belgian magazine) =

Belgian music magazine

More is a printed rock magazine from Belgium. The magazine was started in 1975 and is published monthly. In 1978, following legal issues, More became En Attendant while waiting to recover the title.

== Staff ==
- Bert Bertrand
- Nadine Milo
- Pascal Stevens
- Gilles Verlant
- Annik Honoré
- Michel Duval

== See also ==
- List of magazines in Belgium
