= Figure imposée =

Studio album by Alain Bashung
- Released: 1983
- Genre: French rock, new wave
- Label: Philips, Barclay, Universal Music Group
- Producer: Alain Bashung, Michel Olivier, KGDD

Alain Bashung chronology
Play blessures (1982)	Figure imposée (1983)	Live Tour 85 (1985)

Figure imposée (Compulsory routine) is the fifth album by French rocker Alain Bashung, issued in 1983 on Philips Records.

== Production ==
The album was issued one year after Play blessures (Play harms) which was a commercial and, at first, critical failure, as well as his first and last collaboration with Serge Gainsbourg. Bashung enlisted young songwriter Pascal Jacquemin who wrote most of the lyrics (except "Imbécile" ("Dumb") written by Boris Bergman).

== Commercial performance ==
Figure imposée was a commercial failure as well.

== Track listing ==
No.	Title	Writer(s)	Length
1.	"What's in a Bird"	Pascal Jacquemin / Alain Bashung - Alain Bashung	3:21
2.	"Horoscope"	Pascal Jacquemin / Alain Bashung - Alain Bashung	2:54
3.	"Imbécile"	Boris Bergman - Alain Bashung	3:50
4.	"Hi !"	Pascal Jacquemin / Alain Bashung - Alain Bashung	3:06
5.	"Chaque nuit bébé"	Pascal Jacquemin / Alain Bashung - Alain Bashung	3:32
6.	"Élégance"	Pascal Jacquemin / Alain Bashung - Alain Bashung	4:42
7.	"Poisson d'avril"	Pascal Jacquemin / Monterastelli / Alain Bashung - Alain Bashung	2:54
8.	"Lou ravi"	Pascal Jacquemin / Alain Bashung - Alain Bashung	2:35
9.	"Week-end doux"	Pascal Jacquemin / Alain Bashung - Alain Bashung	4:46
10.	"Nuits Halloween"	Pascal Jacquemin / Alain Bashung - Alain Bashung	4:23

The 1993 CD reissue had both "Lou ravi" and "Nuits Halloween" dropped, replaced by "Spiele Mich an die Wand" (Boris Bergman - Alain Bashung) and "White Spirit" (Jean Fauque - Alain Bashung), the mix of "Élégance" was replaced by its single mix, and the mix of "Imbécile" was replaced by a long version.

== Singles ==
- 1983: Élégance / Horoscope
- 1983: What's in a Bird / Hi !
