= Phil Delire =

Belgian music producer (1956–2024)

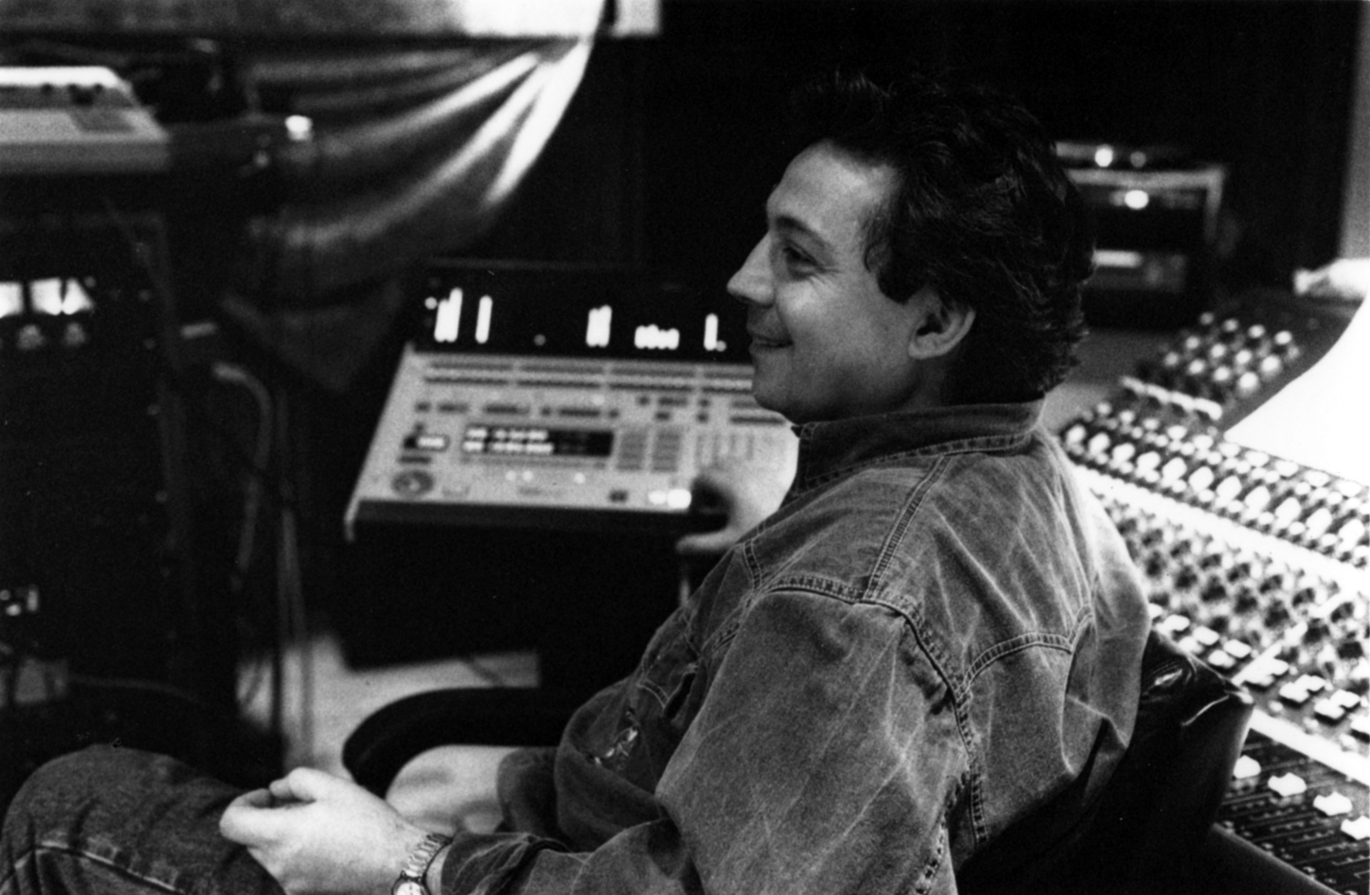
- Delire in 1992
- Born: Philippe Delire; March 13, 1955; Brussels, Belgium
- Died: 1 April 2024 (aged 69)
- Education: INSAS
- Occupation: Music producer

Philippe Delire (13 March 1955 – 1 April 2024) was a Belgian music producer. He notably worked alongside Alain Bashung, Hubert-Félix Thiéfaine, and Renaud.

== Biography ==
Born in Brussels on 13 March 1955, Delire briefly studied at INSAS before teaching himself sound engineering at Morgan Studios, first in London and then in Brussels. Throughout his career, he notably produced music for Lady Gaga, Raphaël Haroche, Philippe Lafontaine, Marc Morgan, Zap Mama, and many more. Delire died on 1 April 2024.
