= My Little Business =

- Directed by: Pierre Jolivet
- Written by: Pierre Jolivet; Simon Michaël
- Produced by: Frédéric Bourboulon
- Starring: Vincent Lindon; François Berléand; Roschdy Zem; Zabou Breitman
- Cinematography: Bertrand Chatry
- Edited by: Yves Deschamps; Agathe Devaux-Charbonnel; Charlotte Teillard D'Eyry
- Music by: Alain Bashung
- Distributed by: BAC Films
- Release date: 1 September 1999
- Running time: 96 minutes
- Country: France
- Language: French
- Budget: $4.2 million
- Box office: $5 million

Ma petite entreprise (English: My Little Business) is a 1999 French film directed by Pierre Jolivet and written by Jolivet and Simon Michaël.

== Cast ==
- Vincent Lindon : Ivan Lansi
- François Berléand : Maxime Nassieff
- Roschdy Zem : Sami
- Zabou Breitman : Nathalie
- Albert Dray : Charles
- Catherine Mouchet : Lucie
- Françoise Sage : Catherine
- Pascal Leguennec : Louis
- Catherine Davenier : Marthe
- Yoann Denaive : Christophe Lansi
- Lokman Nalcakan : Ludo
- Anne Le Ny : Madame Chastaing

== Awards and nominations ==
- César Awards (France)
  - Won: Best Actor – Supporting Role (François Berléand)
  - Nominated: Best Actor – Leading Role (Vincent Lindon)
  - Nominated: Best Actor – Supporting Role (Roschdy Zem)
  - Nominated: Best Actress – Supporting Role (Catherine Mouchet)
  - Nominated: Best Original Screenplay or Adaptation (Pierre Jolivet and Simon Michaël)
- Étoiles d'Or (France)
  - Won: Best Film (Pierre Jolivet)
- Montréal World Film Festival (Canada)
  - Won: Best Screenplay (Pierre Jolivet and Simon Michaël)
  - Nominated: Grand Prix des Amériques (Pierre Jolivet)
