= Hohatzenheim =

Hohatzenheim Àtzne
- Part of Wingersheim-les-Quatre-Bans
- Coat of arms
- Location of Hohatzenheim
- Location within France Location within Grand Est
- Coordinates: 48°43′00″N 7°36′56″E
- Country: France
- Region: Grand Est
- Department: Bas-Rhin
- Arrondissement: Saverne
- Canton: Bouxwiller
- Commune: Wingersheim-les-Quatre-Bans
- Area^{1}: 2.0 km^{2} (0.77 sq mi)
- Highest elevation: 268 m (879 ft)
- Lowest elevation: 195 m (640 ft)
- Population (2021): 241
  - Density: 120/km^{2} (310/sq mi)
- Time zone: UTC+01:00 (CET)
  - Summer (DST): UTC+02:00 (CEST)
- Postal code: 67170
- ^{1} French Land Register data, which excludes lakes, ponds, glaciers > 1 km^{2} (0.386 sq mi or 247 acres) and river estuaries.

Hohatzenheim (Alsatian: Àtzne) is a former commune in the Bas-Rhin department in north-eastern France. On 1 January 2016, it was merged into the new commune Wingersheim-les-Quatre-Bans.

== Population ==
Historical population
Year	Pop.	±% p.a.
2006	215	—
2011	206	−0.85%
2021	241	+1.58%
Source: INSEE

== Pilgrimage church ==
Surrounded by farmland stands a pilgrimage church, restored in 1888. By 1916 it had fallen into disrepair and had to be renewed.

== See also ==
- Communes of the Bas-Rhin department
