= L'Imprudence =

Studio album by Alain Bashung
- Released: 21 October 2002
- Recorded: Studio ICP, Brussels
- Genres: Chanson, art pop
- Length: 66:23
- Labels: Barclay Records, Universal Music Group
- Producer: Anne Lamy

Alain Bashung chronology
Fantaisie militaire (1998)	L'Imprudence (2002)	Cantique des cantiques (2002)

L'Imprudence (The Imprudence) is the eleventh studio album by French singer-songwriter Alain Bashung, issued in October 2002 on Barclay Records.

== Production ==
Alain Bashung cowrote most of the lyrics from this album with Jean Fauque, except "Faisons envie" ("Let us be desirable") which was written with Christophe Miossec, and the song "Jamais d'autre que toi" ("No other than you") which is a poem by Robert Desnos turned into a song. Bashung composed the music, collaborating with Ludovic Bource, Jean Lamoot, Arnaud Devos and the Swiss band Mobile in Motion.

The title of this album is based on Lenteurs et imprudence... (Slownesses and imprudence...), a working title for Fantaisie militaire and on his own "reflection on human relations". This album has been written and composed as Bashung became the father of a daughter and a feeling of "fear, injustice and incomprehension" fed by everyday news. For instance, Bashung said he composed the song "Dans la foulée" ("Following") after the "media backlash against Marie-José Pérec in Australia" during the Sydney Olympics when the athlete, because of pressure and a surge of paranoia, fled the competition. Shocked by the reaction of the media towards her, because of the expectations and after laudatory comments about her, he questions the system. Also, the song "Noir de monde" ("Heavily crowded" but in the sense of "What a dark world", "noir de monde" being a common language expression) is a denunciation of all the revisionists, those of history and others at a more personal scale. Alain Bashung also declared that after the success of Fantaisie militaire he wished to make "a tragic and sensual album".

From a technical viewpoint, Bashung was very careful about the sophistication of musics, arrangements, and even ambiance noises, using the computer technology as a recording tool and not for a question of technical quality. The album is often spoken more than sung, like in the music of Serge Gainsbourg or Léo Ferré like for the singing of Desnos' poem or "Faisons envie" by Miossec.

== Reception ==
=== Critical reception ===
Critical reception was highly positive, with the album variously being called "a landmark" and "sublime", while the music was qualified as "dark" and "crepuscular". In a 2005 volume of L'actualité, a reviewer listed it alongside Fantaisie militaire as one of Bashung’s supreme achievements.

== Track listing ==
No.	Title	Writer(s)	Length
1.	"Tel"	Alain Bashung / Jean Fauque - Alain Bashung / Mobile in Motion	5:39
2.	"Faites monter"	Alain Bashung / Jean Fauque - Alain Bashung / Ludovic Bource	4:21
3.	"Je me dore"	Alain Bashung / Jean Fauque - Alain Bashung / Ludovic Bource	5:05
4.	"Mes bras"	Alain Bashung / Jean Fauque - Alain Bashung / Mobile in Motion	7:47
5.	"La Ficelle"	Alain Bashung / Jean Fauque - Alain Bashung / Arnaud Devos	4:37
6.	"Noir de monde"	Alain Bashung / Jean Fauque - Alain Bashung / Mobile in Motion	4:22
7.	"L'Irréel"	Alain Bashung / Jean Fauque - Alain Bashung / Mobile in Motion / Ludovic Bource / Jean Lamoot	3:36
8.	"Jamais d'autre que toi"	Robert Desnos - Alain Bashung / Ludovic Bource / Jean Lamoot	2:00
9.	"Est-ce aimer"	Alain Bashung / Jean Fauque - Alain Bashung / Arnaud Devos	3:59
10.	"Le Dimanche à Tchernobyl"	Alain Bashung / Jean Fauque - Alain Bashung / Ludovic Bource / Mobile in Motion	5:45
11.	"Dans la foulée"	Alain Bashung / Jean Fauque - Alain Bashung / Arnaud Devos / Arnaud Rebotini	5:22
12.	"Faisons envie"	Christophe Miossec / Alain Bashung / - Alain Bashung / Mobile in Motion	3:44
13.	"L'Imprudence"	Alain Bashung / Jean Fauque - Alain Bashung	9:38

== Personnel ==
=== Musicians ===
- Alain Bashung - vocals, harmonica
- Marc Ribot - electric guitar, acoustic guitar
- Martyn Barker - drums, percussions
- Steve Nieve - organ, piano, tubular bells
- Simon Edwards - bass guitar, double bass, bendir
- Arto Lindsay - electric guitar
- Mino Cinélu - percussions, udu, chimes
- Ludovic Bource - accordion, Wurlitzer, memory Moog, glockenspiel, strings arrangements
- Arnaud Devos - electric guitar, vibraphone, percussions
- Mark Steylaerts - strings direction

== Charts ==
Chart	Top position	Number of weeks in the Top 50	Certification
France	1	6	
Belgium	2	6	
Switzerland	46	3	

== Certifications ==
Region	Certification	Certified units/sales
France (SNEP)	Gold	100,000^{*}
^{*} Sales figures based on certification alone.
