= Alain Bashung =

French singer (1947–2009)

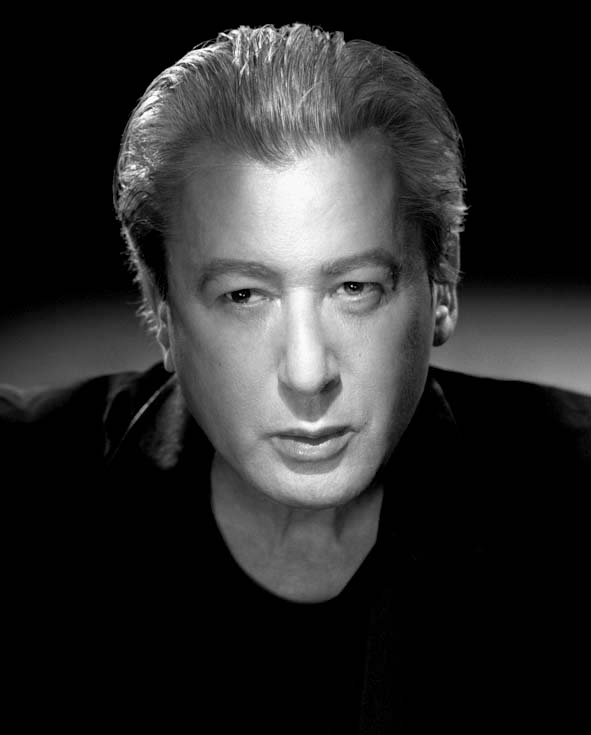
- Bashung in 2007

Background information
- Born: Alain Claude Baschung; 1 December 1947; Paris, France
- Died: 14 March 2009 (aged 61) Paris, France
- Genres: Rock; chanson
- Occupations: Singer; songwriter; actor
- Years active: 1966–2009
- Label: Barclay

Alain Bashung (born Alain Claude Baschung, French pronunciation: [alɛ̃ klod baʃuŋ]; 1 December 1947 – 14 March 2009) was a French singer, songwriter and actor. Credited with reviving the French chanson in "a time of French musical turmoil", he is often regarded as the most important French rock musician after Serge Gainsbourg. He rose to prominence in the early 1980s with hit songs such as "Gaby oh Gaby" and "Vertige de l'amour", and later had a string of hit records from the 1990s onward, such as "Osez Joséphine", "Ma petite entreprise" and "La nuit je mens". He has had an influence on many later French artists, and is the most awarded artist in the Victoires de la Musique history with 12 victories obtained throughout his career.

Bashung's Play blessures (1982), Osez Joséphine (1991), and Fantaisie militaire (1998) have made multiple French lists of the greatest albums. L'Imprudence (2002) and Bleu pétrole (2008), the last two studio albums released during his lifetime, also garnered acclaim. Bashung died at 61 after a two-year fight with lung cancer.

== Biography ==
=== Youth ===
Alain Baschung (he later dropped the "c" from his surname) was the son of a Breton mother working in a rubber factory and an Algerian father, whom he never knew. His mother remarried, and at the age of one, Bashung was sent to Wingersheim, near Strasbourg to live with his stepfather's parents. He spent his childhood in the countryside, in a rather conservative environment, alongside a grandmother who did not speak French. He discovered music during his childhood, notably Kurt Weill's Mahagonny, and began to practice with a Rosebud harmonica offered to him when he was five. He also was involved in basketball and cycling, and sang in the church choir in Wingersheim.

He came back to Paris in 1959, where he discovered the great chanson artists, and then rock artists such as Gene Vincent, Buddy Holly (whom he admired deeply), and Elvis Presley. While studying (before dropping out after he was awarded a BTS in accountancy from the École nationale de commerce in 1965), he formed a band called Les Dunces playing folk music and rockabilly.

=== Long beginnings ===
He later formed a band with musicians met in Royan, and then began to tour in restaurants, hotels and U.S. military bases. He began his career with his first EP, "Pourquoi rêvez-vous des États-Unis ?" in 1966, which he wrote and composed. At the same time, he joined the RCA label to become a music arranger. He wrote songs for French artists. In June 1967, at the Palais des Sports of Paris, he was the opening act (alongside Noël Deschamps and Ronnie Bird) of artists such as the Pretty Things, the Troggs or Cream.

In 1968, he released his first single, "Les Romantiques", which was largely ignored by the public and unsuccessful. Around that time, he dropped the "c" from his name and spent some time at the house of fellow singer Christophe.

From 1972 to 1974, he composed some of the music and cowrote three albums and three singles (including "Marilou") for French rock singer Dick Rivers. In 1973, he played Robespierre in the musical La Révolution française by Claude-Michel Schönberg.

In 11 years, he released no less than four EPs and ten singles, one under the moniker of David Bergen, and two others in 1976 and 1977 as Hendrick Darmen, composer for a band called Monkey Bizness. All of them failed to have any impact.

=== Boris Bergman and first successes ===
He then met sound engineer Andy Scott and lyricist Boris Bergman. Together, they realized his first album Roman-photos, with a country and rockabilly sound, which was a commercial failure as punk rock was rising. In 1979, he produced another album, Roulette russe, darker and leaning more openly toward rock. In 1980, he released the single "Gaby oh Gaby", which became his breakthrough success (selling more than a million copies).

His critical and commercial success was confirmed with his next album, Pizza, which allowed him, thanks to his second hit success, "Vertige de l'amour", to tour in prestigious locations, such as the Olympia. However, he broke with Bergman at the time.

=== Artistic turn ===
In 1982, Bashung released an album called Play blessures, written by Serge Gainsbourg. The album, in contrast with its immediate predecessor, is dark, minimalistic and inaccessible. The album was intended to break away from his unexpected success. It was a commercial and, at first, critical failure, Bashung being called by some the "Johnny Hallyday of new wave". Yet, it is now considered a classic album in France.

In 1983, he produced another dark album, Figure imposée, which also met with little success. However, in 1984 he made peace with Boris Bergman, and the lyricist wrote for him "SOS Amor" which was a surprise hit. In 1985, he sang "Touche pas à mon pote", a single for the association SOS Racisme.

In the wake of the success of "SOS Amor", he released in 1986 the album Passé le Rio Grande, which allowed him to get his first Victoires de la musique award.

In 1989, he returned to a dark, experimental style with the album Novice, from which the singles "Bombez !", "Pyromanes" and "Étrange été" were released. The album marked his first collaboration with lyricist Jean Fauque and his definitive breakup with Boris Bergman.

=== Mainstream and critical success ===
In 1991, he released another album with Fauque as lyricist, Osez Joséphine, which also included some cover versions of classic American rock songs. The album helped him achieve mainstream success, selling 350.000 copies and "Osez Joséphine" became his first real popular success since "Vertige de l'amour". On the same album is featured "Madame rêve", another classic in a different, more atmospheric style, which would be a trademark of his future releases.

In 1992, he covered the French pop classic song "Les Mots bleus", from the album by the same name by Christophe, for an AIDS research support compilation. In 1994, he released Chatterton, which he called a "new age country" album. For this album, he worked with artists such as Sonny Landreth, Ally McErlaine, Link Wray, Marc Ribot or Stéphane Belmondo. The single "Ma petite entreprise" was a new popular success. Following the album, he toured for two years and in 1995 released the double live album Confessions publiques.

From 1994 onwards, Bashung began to spend more time for his acting career (which he started in 1981 with Nestor Burma, détective de choc), for instance with Ma sœur chinoise by Alain Mazars.

After recording a duet with Brigitte Fontaine, "City" for her Les Palaces album, he came back to music in 1998 with Fantaisie militaire. For this album, he notably collaborated with Jean Fauque, Rodolphe Burger, Les Valentins, Jean-Marc Lederman and Adrian Utley of Portishead. The arrangements and strings were done by Joseph Racaille. The first single from the album was "La nuit je mens" which was another hit for Bashung. For the album, he received 3 more Victoires de la musique awards in 1999 (and in 2005, he received another for the "best album of the last twenty years"). For Bashung, it was a huge commercial and critical success.

In 2000, he released the compilation Climax, on which some songs are rerecordings as duets with notable artists from the French scene (most famously, the song "Volontaire" from Play blessures with French band Noir Désir). That same year, he cowrote "L'Eau et le vin" for Vanessa Paradis' album Bliss.

In 2002, he released another album, L'Imprudence to critical acclaim, which is considered one of the darker albums of his discography. The album is not easily accessible and features strings and electronic arrangements, with sometimes nearly spoken lyrics, and was inspired according to Bashung by old black and white movies. That same year, he recorded the album Cantique des cantiques with his new wife, singer Chloé Mons, the song was written for their wedding in 2001 by Rodolphe Burger, from a new translation of Solomon's Song of Songs by Olivier Cadiot. In 2003, he sang the French chanson classic "Avec le temps" by Léo Ferré for a tribute album to the late artist, Avec Léo ! and wrote the preface to a book about that artist.

In 2004, the double live album La Tournée des grands espaces was released. In 2005, he sang "Le Sud" on a tribute album to Nino Ferrer, On dirait Nino. In 2006, he recorded a Charles Trenet song, "Que reste-t-il de nos amours ?" as a duet with Françoise Hardy for her album (Parenthèses...).

In June 2006, in the Cité de la musique in Paris, he got the opportunity to sing for several days. There he brought on stage artists such as Christophe, Dominique A, Rodolphe Burger or Arto Lindsay. In early 2007, after a small break, he was involved in the Les Aventuriers d'un autre monde tour alongside rock and pop artists Jean-Louis Aubert, Cali, Daniel Darc, Richard Kolinka and Raphaël. He sang for a couple of evenings in the Salle Pleyel in Paris, and played the role of Jack the Ripper for the song "Panique Mécanique" on Dionysos' album La Mécanique du Cœur.

That same year, he played with Belgian singer Arno in the movie J'ai toujours rêvé d'être un gangster, by Samuel Benchetrit. They appear as themselves, arguing over the authorship of a song.

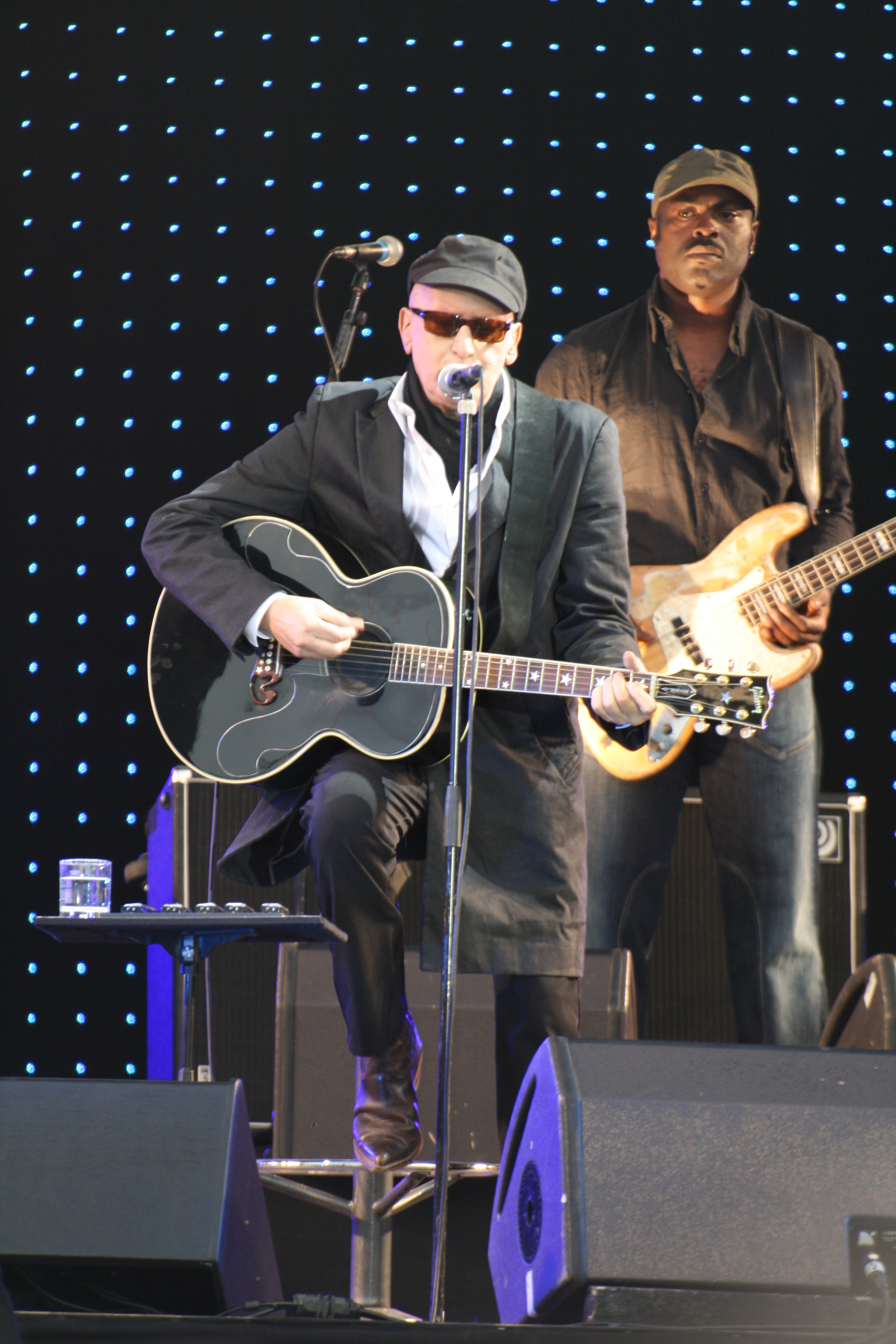
Bashung during his last tour, on 11 July 2008, at the Francofolies in La Rochelle.

In 2008, he sang "L.U.V." as a duet with Daniel Darc for the latter's album, Amours suprêmes. He was also involved in Étienne Daho's Daho Show, covering "I Can't Escape from You" as a duet with Daho. He also rerecorded Serge Gainsbourg's classic album, L'Homme à tête de chou, for a show.

On 24 March 2008, he released the album Bleu pétrole, collaborating notably with Gaëtan Roussel of French band Louise Attaque, Arman Méliès, M. Ward or Gérard Manset (covering the latter's song "Il voyage en solitaire" as the final song on the album). He then began to tour for the album. The 10 June 2008, he sang several times at the Olympia although he was undergoing a chemotherapy for his lung cancer. Jean Fauque claimed that a new album was underway.

=== Final months and death ===
On 1 January 2009, Bashung was made Chevalier (Knight) of the Légion d'honneur. On 28 February 2009, he received three prestigious Victoires de la Musique awards for his final album Bleu pétrole. The 2009 award ceremony was his last public appearance. He appeared frail, but still performed "Résidents de la République." He won the Best male artist of the year, Best album and Best tour awards.

Bashung died in Paris on 14 March 2009 from lung cancer at the age of 61 at the Hôpital Saint-Joseph in Paris. After a religious ceremony at the Abbey of Saint-Germain-des-Prés, he was buried on 20 March 2009 in the Père Lachaise Cemetery.

=== Posthumous events ===
On 12 November 2009, the opening of a ballet using a rerecording of L'Homme à tête de chou, a 1976 Serge Gainsbourg album, by Bashung as the soundtrack, occurred at the Maison de la Culture de Grenoble, with a choreography by Jean-Claude Gallotta who approached him in 2007 to adapt the work.

On 27 November 2009, a box set called À perte de vue, which contained the entire output of Bashung so far (on 27 discs), was released. The box set features his twelve solo albums so far, his five live albums, his two duet albums with Chloé Mons, two albums of instrumentals and three albums of covers, duets and rarities. Alongside this box set a double live album documenting his last tour, called Dimanches à l'Élysée and recorded at the Élysée Montmartre on 14 December 2008, was released on 16 November. That same day, a live video recorded at the Olympia 10 and 15 June 2008 was released. This DVD was awarded the 2010 Victoires de la musique award for best musical DVD of the year. At the same Victoires ceremony, French singer Benjamin Biolay, who was awarded the Best male artist of the year award, paid tribute to Bashung.

He can be heard singing La nuit je mens in the closing scenes of the final episode of the French television series Les Bleus: premiers pas dans la police (2006–10). On 26 April 2011, a tribute album called Tels Alain Bashung was released. It features twelve covers of Bashung songs by various artists and bands, with a documentary called Alain Bashung - Faisons envie directed by Thierry Villeneuve. On 7 November 2011, his rerecording of L'Homme à tête de chou was released on Barclay Records.

== Influence ==
A multi-platinum artist, Bashung received three awards during the ceremony at the Paris Zenith, including best male artist, best album for "Bleu Pétrole" (Barclay/Universal) and best live show. He spent his career singing a pop-chanson repertoire. With 12 trophies won since 1993, he was the most awarded artist in the history of the Victoires de la Musique. Bashung, who had cancer, had to postpone several dates of his last tour. While receiving his award, he said he hoped that record companies would "remain in a human dimension by making people happy with records."

In February 2010, the French edition of Rolling Stone magazine placed six of his albums in their list "100 disques essentiels du rock français" (100 Essential French Rock Albums) with two albums in the top 10, Osez Joséphine at number one, and Fantaisie militaire at number nine.

== Discography ==
=== Studio albums ===
Year	Album	Charts				
Year	Album	FRA	CAN	BEL	SWI	EUR
1977	Roman-photos	-	-	-	-	-
1979	Roulette russe	13	-	-	-	-
1981	Pizza	1	-	-	-	-
1982	Play blessures	-	-	-	-	-
1983	Figure imposée	-	-	-	-	-
1986	Passé le Rio Grande	-	-	-	-	-
1989	Novice	-	-	-	-	-
1991	Osez Joséphine	14	-	-	-	-
1994	Chatterton	6	-	-	-	-
1998	Fantaisie militaire	1	-	15	-	-
2002	L'Imprudence	1	-	2	46	-
2002	Cantique des cantiques with Chloé Mons	-	-	-	-	-
2006	La Ballade de Calamity Jane with Chloé Mons and Rodolphe Burger	-	-	-	-	-
2008	Bleu pétrole	1	20	4	11	14
2011	L'Homme à tête de chou	-	-	-	-	-
2018	En amont	-	-	8	5	-

=== Singles ===
Year	Single	Charts	
Year	Single	FRA	BEL
1966	"Pourquoi rêvez-vous des États-Unis?"	-	-
1967	"T'as qu'à dire Yeah"	-	-
1967	"Tu es une petite enfant qui fait la belle"	-	-
1968	"Chère petite chose"	66	-
1968	"Les romantiques"	-	-
1969	"Lise"	-	-
1969	"La rivière"	-	-
1969	"Simplement quelques jours"	-	-
1969	"Ho gli occhi chuisi"	-	-
1970	"Un jour viendra"	-	-
1971	"Du feu dans les veines"	-	-
1973	"Bois de santal"	-	-
1977	"Roman Photos"	71	-
1977	"C'est la faute à Dylan"	-	-
1979	"Je fume pour oublier que tu bois"	-	-
1980	"Gaby oh Gaby"	2	-
1981	"Vertige de l'amour"	1	-
1981	"Rebel"	19	-
1981	"C'est comment qu'on freine?"	45	-
1983	"Elégance"	-	-
1984	"S.O.S. Amor"	36	-
1985	"Tu touches pas à mon pote"	-	-
1985	"Hey Joe"	59	-
1986	"L'arrivée du Tour"	44	-
1986	"Malédiction"	36	-
1989	"Bombez!"	76	-
1989	"Pyromanes"	94	-
1989	"Etrange été"	-	-
1991	"Osez Joséphine"	14	-
1991	"J'écume"	-	-
1992	"Madame rêve"	-	-
1994	"Ma petite entreprise"	61	-
1994	"J'passe pour une caravane"	31	-
1998	"La nuit je mens"	12	-
1998	"Sommes-nous"	24	-
1998	"Aucun express"	39	-
2003	"La ficelle"	-	-
2008	"Résidents de la République"	49	32
2008	"Je t'ai manqué"	33	-
2009	"Sur un trapèze"	-	-
2013	"La nuit je mens"	-	-

=== Live albums ===
- 1985 : Live Tour 85
- 1992 : Tour Novice
- 1995 : Confessions publiques
- 2004 : La Tournée des grands espaces
- 2009 : Dimanches à l'Élysée

=== Compilations ===
- 1993 : Réservé aux indiens
- 1999 : Climax
- 2000 : Ma petite entreprise (original soundtrack to the film My Little Business)

== Filmography ==
=== Actor ===
- 1981 : Nestor Burma, détective de choc de Jean-Luc Miesch
- 1981 : Le Cimetière des voitures de Fernando Arrabal
- 1991 : Rien que des mensonges de Paule Muret
- 1992 : L'Ombre du doute de Aline Issermann
- 1994 : Ma sœur chinoise de Alain Mazars
- 1995 : Le Jeu de la clé de Michel Hassan
- 1998 : Mon père, ma mère, mes frères et mes sœurs... de Charlotte de Turckheim
- 1999 : Je veux tout de Patrick Braoudé
- 2000 : La Confusion des Genres de Ilan Duran Cohen
- 2000 : Retour à la vie de Pascal Baeumler (avec Emmanuelle Laborit)
- 2000 : Félix et Lola de Patrice Leconte
- 2000 : L'Origine du monde de Jérôme Enrico
- 2002 : La Bande du drugstore de François Armanet
- 2003 : Le P'tit Curieux de Jean Marbœuf
- 2006 : Arthur et les Minimoys de Luc Besson (voix de M Le maudit)
- 2007 : J'ai toujours rêvé d'être un gangster de Samuel Benchetrit
- 2014 : Jack et la mécanique du cœur [jack the ripper] {died before screening}

=== Composer ===
- 1981 : Nestor Burma, détective de choc de Jean-Luc Miesch
- 1985 : Le Quatrième Pouvoir de Serge Leroy
- 1986 : Le Beauf de Yves Amoureux
- 1992 : Le Jeune Werther de Jacques Doillon
- 1994 : Pigalle de Karim Dridi
- 1999 : Ma petite entreprise de Pierre Jolivet

Preceded by Patrick Bruel	Victoires de la Musique; Male artist of the year 1993	Succeeded by Alain Souchon
Preceded by Florent Pagny	Victoires de la Musique; Male artist of the year 1999	Succeeded by -M-
Preceded by Abd Al Malik	Victoires de la Musique; Male group or artist of the year 2009	Succeeded by Benjamin Biolay
