= Roman-photos =

Studio album by Alain Bashung
- Released: 1977
- Genre: French rock, rockabilly, country
- Length: 33:10
- Label: Barclay, Universal Music Group
- Producer: Daniel Darras, Jean-Pierre Pouret

Alain Bashung chronology
Roman-photos (1977)	Roulette russe (1979)

Roman-photos (Fotonovelas) is the debut album by French rock musician Alain Bashung, released in 1977 through Barclay Records. The first issues of the album simply bore the artist's name.

== Production ==
Alain Bashung was 30 years old when he recorded this first album, even though his career was already 11 years old, as he had published several singles that were commercial failures.

French singer Daniel Balavoine, who would go on to have enormous commercial success as a pop singer in the 80s, but who was then nearly unknown, sings background vocals on the album.

The album was also released as the first side to a joint compilation with Herbert Léonard, titled 16 grands succès (16 golden hits), a rather misleading title given the fact that this album would be a commercial failure.

== Reception ==
=== Commercial performance ===
The album was a commercial failure when it was first released in 1977. After that, the album was disowned by Bashung and it was not reissued neither on vinyl nor on CD for a while. Only the track "C'est la faute à Dylan" ("It's because of Dylan") would resurface in other ways. The album was finally reissued on CD as part of the box set Les Hauts de Bashung (Bashung's Highs) in 2002.

Bashung said about the album in French magazine Les Inrockuptibles: "J'ai volontairement fait disparaître cet album de mon intégrale, parce que j'estime qu'il ne me ressemble pas du tout. À l'origine, il devait s'intituler « Maquettes » et, avec le recul, il aurait vraiment mérité de rester dans les tiroirs. J'étais simplement satisfait d'avoir pu faire un album, à une époque où c'était encore un privilège réservé aux grands de la chanson, mais je n'avais encore abouti aucune de mes réflexions. J'avais un truc en tête, mais je cherchais encore confusément la manière de le faire. La production discographique n'était pas vraiment prête à investir dans le particularisme et, partant de ce constat, je n'avais pas ma place. Pas encore, en tout cas." ("I voluntarily left this album out my integral, as I think it does not reflect me at all. Originally, it was to be named "Maquettes" (Demos), and after time passed, I really thought it should not have been released. I was just satisfied to have made an album, at a time when only the big names in music could afford the privilege, but I was not through thinking about what I wanted to achieve. I had things in my head, but I was still unsure about how to do it. The producers were not really ready to invest in uncommon things and, starting from there, I didn't have my place. Not yet, at least.")

== Track listing ==
No.	Title	Writer(s)	Length
1.	"Roman-photos" (with Valérie Lagrange)	Daniel Tardieu - Alain Bashung	2:43
2.	"L'amour c'est pas confortable"	Boris Bergman - Alain Bashung	3:33
3.	"Blablas"	Boris Bergman - Alain Bashung	2:59
4.	"Le Pianiste de l'Éden"	Daniel Tardieu - Alain Bashung	3:15
5.	"C'est la faute à Dylan"	Boris Bergman - Alain Bashung	3:43
6.	"Kimono"	Boris Bergman - Alain Bashung	4:59
7.	"Te revoir"	Daniel Tardieu - Alain Bashung	3:44
8.	"Y'a des jours"	Boris Bergman - Alain Bashung	3:31
9.	"Cendrillon de Chinatown"	Boris Bergman - Alain Bashung	4:43

== Singles ==
- 1977 : Roman-photos (avec Valérie Lagrange) / Le Pianiste de l'Éden (France : 71)
- 1977 : C'est la faute à Dylan / Kimono
