= Gérard Manset =

- Born: 21 August 1945 (age 81); Saint-Cloud, France
- Genre: Rock
- Occupations: Singer-songwriter, painter, photographer, writer
- Years active: 1968 –
- Labels: EMI, Capitol, Parlophone
- Website: manset.fr

Gérard Manset (also known as Manset; born 21 August 1945 in Saint-Cloud, Hauts-de-Seine) is a French singer-songwriter, painter, photographer and writer. He is best known for his musical work. Since 1972, the covers of his albums state his name as simply "Manset".

== Life ==
Manset spent his childhood in the suburbs of Paris (Saint-Cloud) and then in the sixteenth arrondissement of Paris. He failed his baccalauréat due to a failing grade in French.

In 1964, Manset was the recipient of the Concours général, and enrolled in the École Nationale Supérieure des Arts Décoratifs. The Salon d'Automne welcomed Manset in its engraving section in 1966. Manset's work was also shown at the Paris Salon. At the same time, Manset approached various French advertising agencies with his drawings, without success.

Manset began to play the guitar, but was also interested in the drums. He borrowed his sister's piano book, and began learning to play the piano as well.

The mystery that was created around Manset was born from the rarity of his media appearances, his refusal to give concerts, and what has been presented as the 'uncompromising' character of his work.

== Discography ==
=== Albums ===
- 1968: Gérard Manset
- 1970: La mort d'Orion
- 1972: Long long chemin
- 1975: Y'a une route
- 1976: Rien à raconter
- 1978: 2870
- 1979: Royaume de Siam
- 1981: L'atelier du crabe
- 1981: Le train du soir
- 1982: Comme un guerrier
- 1984: Lumières
- 1985: Prisonnier de l'inutile
- 1989: Matrice
- 1991: Revivre
- 1994: La vallée de la paix
- 1998: Jadis et naguère
- 2004: Le langage oublié
- 2006: Obok
- 2008: Manitoba ne répond plus
- 2014: Un oiseau s'est posé(remix)
- 2016: Opération Aphrodite
- 2018: A bord du Blossom
- 2022: Le crabe aux pinces d'homme
- 2024: l'Algue Bleue

=== Compilations ===
- 1971: Gérard Manset 1968
- 1976: Il voyage en solitaire
- 1982: Comme un guerrier
- 1988: Man Set
- 1990: Toutes choses
- 1992: Entrez dans le rêve
- 1999: Best Of
- 1999: Manset
- 2002: Capitaine courageux
- 2004: Best Of +
- 2007: Platinum Collection
- 2015: Classic 2015 Alternatif best Of
- 2016: Mansetlandia The Ultimate Artefact

=== Tribute albums ===
- 1996: Various artists: Route Manset
- 2015: Raphael: Solitude des latitudes

Year	Album	Peak positions
Year	Album	FR
1998	Jadis et naguère	24
2004	Le Langage oublié	14
2006	Obok	15
2008	Manitoba ne répond plus	18
2014	Un oiseau s'est posé	8
2016	Operation Aphrodite	14
2016	Mansetlandia	139

== Writings and travel notes ==
- 1987 : Royaume de Siam – Éditions Aubier
- 1987 : Chambres d'Asie – Éditions Aubier
- 1994 : Wisut kasat – Éditions Les Belles Lettres
- 1994 : Aqui te espero – Éditions Les Belles Lettres
- 2000 : 72 heures à Angkor – Éditions Les Belles Lettres
- 2007 : Les Petites Bottes vertes – Éditions Gallimard
- 2008 : À la poursuite du Facteur Cheval – Éditions Gallimard
- 2011 : Visage d'un dieu inca – Éditions Gallimard
- 2011 : Journées ensoleillées – Éditions Favre
- 2012 : La terre endormie – Filigranes Editions
- 2012 : Abbaye de Fontevraud – Éditions Abbaye de Fontevraud
- 2012 : Bruxelles – Editions Zanpano
- 2015 : Ephémère-Francofolies 1987 et 2014 – Editions Filigranes
- 2018 : Cupidon de la nuit – Editions Albin Michel
- 2019 : Récits barbares – Editions Albin Michel

Joint collective works

- 2013 : Oh ce sera beau – éditions Zanpano (text and drawings)

== Books about Gérard Manset ==
- 1995 : Gérard Manset – Celui qui marche devant – Daniel Lesueur, Editions Alternatives
- 2010 : Manset – Légende de l'Inini – Alexis Omble, Editions Les belles lettres
