= Play blessures =

Studio album by Alain Bashung
- Released: 1982
- Studio: Studio Vénus, Longueville; Studio 92, Boulogne
- Genre: French rock, post-punk, Cold wave, new wave
- Label: Philips, Barclay, Universal Music Group
- Producer: Alain Bashung, Michel Olivier

Alain Bashung chronology
Pizza (1981)	Play blessures (1982)	Figure imposée (1983)

Play blessures (Play injuries) is the fourth studio album by French rock musician Alain Bashung, issued in 1982 on Philips Records. It is generally considered to be among his most significant works.

== Production ==
After the success of "Gaby oh Gaby" and "Vertige de l'amour", Bashung wanted to benefit from his sudden glory and financial success, since he waited for it for about fifteen years, by making musical experiments, far from the lightness of the two hits that made him famous. The sudden commercial success of Pizza had driven him into a depression. For his new album, Bashung chose to not work with his lyricist Boris Bergman. With his newfound favourite musicians, the KGDD (Manfred Kovacic, Olivier Guindon, Franz Delage and Philippe Draï), with whom he just recorded the soundtrack to Fernando Arrabal's movie, Le Cimetière des voitures, he went to the studio and recorded a new album, improvising the lyrics in a pseudo-English. This album, in contrast with the rather bleak sound he achieved, was recorded in a happy and quite light mood, with no other goal than exploring new musical landscapes. After recording the album, he learned that Serge Gainsbourg wanted to work with him and got in touch. The two shared songwriting on the new record.

Thanks to him, Bashung chose to break away from the reputation he had built, making a very dark album, in the lyrics as much as in the music, with a post-punk influence.

Originally, the album should have been titled "Apocalypso" (keeping up with the front cover of the tom-tom player surrounded by flames), but it was renamed "Play blessures" (from a lyric on the song "Lavabo" ("Washbasin")) because the American band The Motels recorded an album with the same title at the same time. "Play" sounds like the French word plaies, i.e. wounds.

The 28th of March 2011 a show written by Pierre Mikaïloff and Arnaud Viviant premiered at the Théâtre Marigny of Paris, [Re]Play Blessures, which recounted the birth of the album. Irène Jacob was the narrator, while the singers on the scene were: Alain Chamfort who sang "Chasseur d’ivoire" ("Ivory hunter"), Boris Bergman who sang "Junge Männer", Axel Bauer who sang "C’est comment qu’on freine ?", Barbara Carlotti who sang "Lavabo", Irène Jacob and Florent Marchet who sang "Volontaire", and Joseph d'Anvers who sang "J’envisage" ("I envision"). The musical direction was made by Frédéric Lo, with the band RoCoCo.

== Reception ==
=== Commercial ===
The coldness and spareness of the arrangements, the dark and hard to understand lyrics, often vague, made this album hardly accessible for the public, who just discovered Bashung. Some critics described the album as an attempt at commercial suicide, and it did not sell well.

=== Critical ===
The critical reception was rather negative at first. Except Libération, the press was somewhat hostile to the album and baffled, Bashung being called on one occasion the "Johnny Hallyday of new wave".

However, the album quickly gained cult status, being seen now as one of Bashung's greatest artistic statements. In 1995, French magazine Rock & Folk chose it as one of the 300 essential discs from the period 1965-1995 and, in 1999, it was included again in their revised list of the greatest albums of the period 1963-1999. In 1993, French magazine Télérama chose it as one of the greatest albums of all time. Volume magazine included it in 2008 in their list of "albums that changed the world".

In 2010, the album was included in the book Philippe Manœuvre présente : Rock français, de Johnny à BB Brunes, 123 albums essentiels.

== Track listing ==
No.	Title	Writer(s)	Length
1.	"C'est comment qu'on freine ?"	Serge Gainsbourg / Alain Bashung - Alain Bashung	3:27
2.	"Scènes de manager"	Serge Gainsbourg / Alain Bashung - Alain Bashung	3:45
3.	"Volontaire"	Serge Gainsbourg / Alain Bashung - Alain Bashung	4:07
4.	"Prise femelle (instrumental)"	Alain Bashung	1:05
5.	"Martine boude"	Serge Gainsbourg / Alain Bashung - Alain Bashung	3:36
6.	"Lavabo"	Serge Gainsbourg / Alain Bashung - Alain Bashung	3:17
7.	"J'envisage"	Serge Gainsbourg / Alain Bashung - Alain Bashung	4:37
8.	"J'croise aux Hébrides"	Serge Gainsbourg / Alain Bashung - Alain Bashung	4:16
9.	"Junge Männer"	Boris Bergman - Alain Bashung	2:59
10.	"Trompé d'érection"	Serge Gainsbourg / Alain Bashung - Alain Bashung	3:17

=== Bonus Tracks (CD reissue) ===
No.	Title	Writer(s)	Length
11.	"Strip Now"	Boris Bergman - Alain Bashung	4:35
12.	"Bistouri scalpel"	Boris Bergman - Alain Bashung	4:17
13.	"Procession (instrumental)"	Alain Bashung	14:46

The three tracks on the CD reissue of the album are all from the Le Cimetière des voitures soundtrack.

== Singles ==
- 1981 : C'est comment qu'on freine ? / Trompé d'érection (France : 45)

== Personnel ==
- Alain Bashung - vocals, guitar
- Ollie Guindon - guitar
- Philippe Draï - drums, percussions, harmonica, drum machine
- Manfred Kovacic ("le prince de Clichy") - synths, piano, saxophone
- François Delage - bass guitar.=
- Roland Panza - guitar on "Junge Männer" and "J'envisage"
