= Gilles Verlant =

Belgian journalist

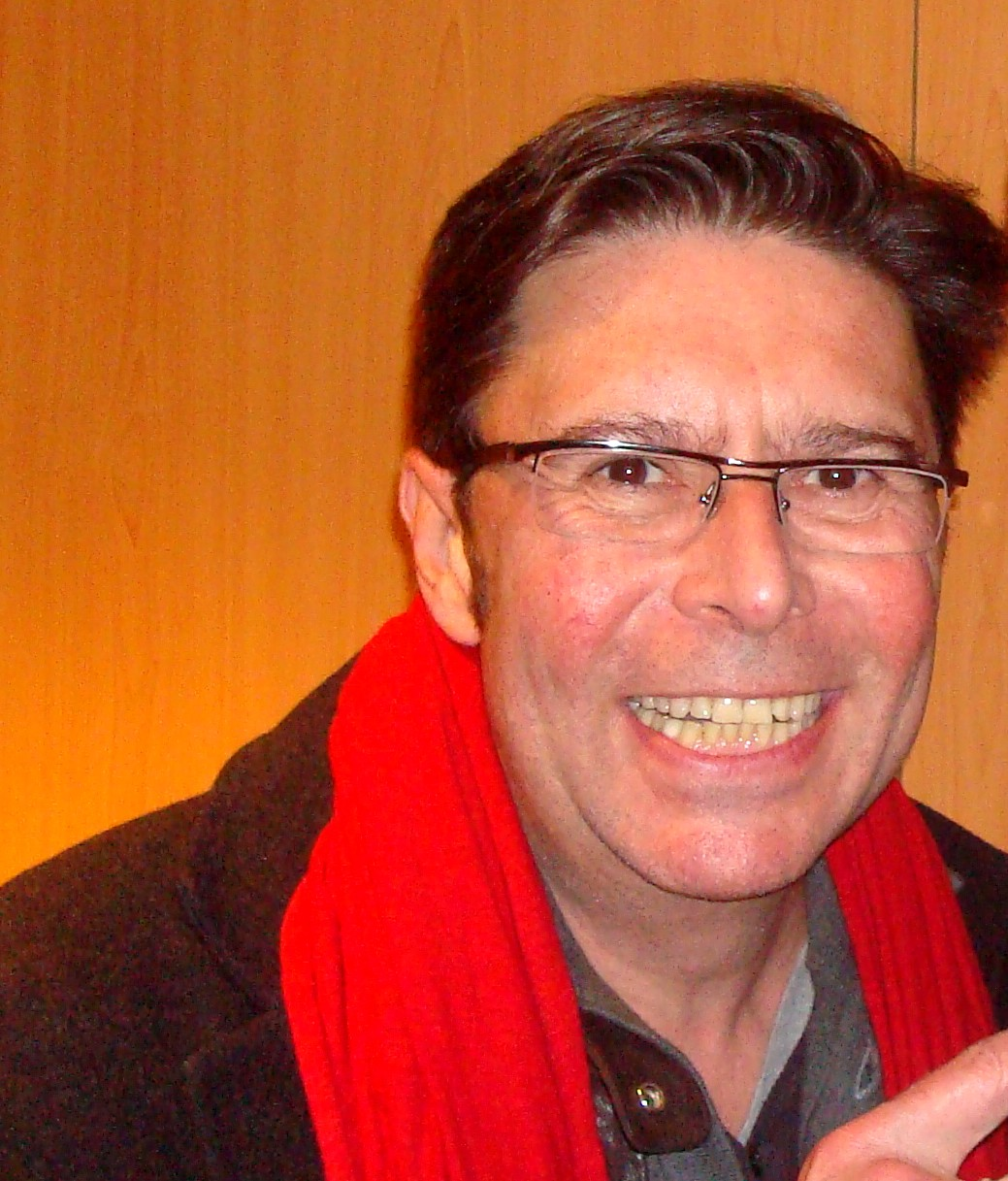
Verlant in 2010.

Gilles Verlant (11 June 1957 – 20 September 2013) was a Belgian journalist, best known as a music critic and rock expert. He was also Serge Gainsbourg's friend and wrote his definitive biography. He died from falling down a set of stairs.

== Work ==
Verlant published regularly in the following magazines:

- More (monthly)
- En Attendant (monthly)

Verlant has written the following books:

- Verlant, Gilles; Brierre, Jean-Dominique; Deschamps, Stéphane (2000). Gainsbourg. Albin Michel. ISBN 2-226-12060-2.
- Verlant, Gilles (2002). Françoise Hardy, ma vie intérieure. Albin Michel. ISBN 2-226-13446-8.
- Verlant, Gilles (2002). Balavoine. Albin Michel. ISBN 2-226-12558-2.
- Mazzoleni, Florent; Verlant, Gilles (2004). L'odyssée du rock. Hors collection. ISBN 2-258-06474-0.
- Lio; Verlant, Gilles (2005). Pop model. J'ai lu. ISBN 2-290-34721-3.
- Perrin, Jean-Éric [in French]; Rey, Jerôme; Verlant, Gilles (2009). Les Miscellanées du rock. Paris: Éditions Fetjaine / La Martinière. ISBN 978-2-35425-130-7.

== See also ==
- Punk rock in Belgium
