= 56th Venice International Film Festival =

Italian film festival in 1999

- Opening film: Eyes Wide Shut
- Closing film: My Voyage to Italy
- Location: Venice, Italy
- Founded: 1932
- Awards: Golden Lion: Not One Less
- Hosted by: Anna Galiena
- Artistic director: Alberto Barbera
- Festival date: 1 – 11 September 1999
- Website: Website

Venice Film Festival chronology
- 57th 55th

The 56th annual Venice International Film Festival was held between 1 and 11 September 1999.

Stanley Kubrick's final film Eyes Wide Shut was the festival's opening film. Yugoslavian filmmaker Emir Kusturica was the Jury President for the main competition.

The Golden Lion was awarded to Not One Less directed by Zhang Yimou.

== Juries ==
The following people comprised the 1999 jury:

=== Main Competition ===
- Emir Kusturica, Yugoslavian director - Jury President
- Marco Bellocchio, Italian director
- Maggie Cheung, Chinese actress
- Jonathan Coe, British novelist and film critic
- Jean Douchet, French film critic
- Shôzô Ichiyama, Japanese film producer
- Arturo Ripstein, Mexican director
- Cindy Sherman, American photographer

=== Luigi De Laurentiis Award for a Debut Feature ===
- Claire Denis - French director, Jury President
- Férid Boughedir, Tunisian director
- Kent Jones, American film critic
- Morando Morandini, Italian film critic
- Ferzan Ozpetek, Italian director

=== Short Films Competition ===
- Erick Zonca, French director - Jury President
- Hilke Doering, German festival curator
- Andrea Occhipinti, Italian actor and producer

== Official Sections ==
The following films were selected to be screened:

=== In Competition ===
English title	Original title	Director(s)	Production country
Appassionate		Tonino De Bernardi	Italy
The Cider House Rules		Lasse Hallström	United States
Crazy in Alabama		Antonio Banderas	United States
Empty Days	Rien à faire	Marion Vernoux	France
Holy Smoke!		Jane Campion	Australia
Jesus' Son		Alison Maclean	Canada, United States
Lies	거짓말	Jang Sun-woo	South Korea
Mal		Alberto Seixas Santos	Portugal
Night Wind	Le vent de la nuit	Philippe Garrel	France, Italy, Switzerland
No Scandal	Pas de scandale	Benoît Jacquot	France
Northern Skirts	Nordrand	Barbara Albert	Austria, Germany, Switzerland
Not One Less	一個都不能少	Zhang Yimou	China
A Pornographic Affair	Une liaison pornographique	Frédéric Fonteyne	Belgium, France, Switzerland, Luxembourg
See You	A domani	Gianni Zanasi	Italy
Seventeen Years	過年回家	Zhang Yuan	China
Topsy-Turvy		Mike Leigh	United Kingdom
A Week in the Life of a Man	Tydzień z życia mężczyzny	Jerzy Stuhr	Poland
The Wind Will Carry Us	باد ما را خواهد برد	Abbas Kiarostami	Iran, France

=== Out of Competition ===
English title	Original title	Director(s)	Production country
Eyes Wide Shut		Stanley Kubrick	United Kingdom
My Voyage to Italy	Il mio viaggio in Italia	Martin Scorsese	Italy
Sweet and Lowdown		Woody Allen	United States
Special events
After the Rain	雨あがる	Takashi Koizumi	Japan
Luchino Visconti		Carlo Lizzani	Italy
A Respectable Man	Un uomo perbene	Maurizio Zaccaro	Italy
Típota		Fabrizio Bentivoglio	Italy
Special screenings
The Venice Project		Robert Dornhelm	United States, Austria

=== Cinema del Presente ===
English title	Original title	Director(s)	Production country
Autumn	Autunno	Nina di Majo	Italy
Barren Illusion	大いなる幻影	Kiyoshi Kurosawa	Japan
Beau Travail		Claire Denis	France
Bleeder		Nicolas Winding Refn	Denmark
But Forever in My Mind	Come te nessuno mai	Gabriele Muccino	Italy
Boys Don't Cry		Kimberly Peirce	United States
Buddy Boy		Mark Hanlon	United States
A Civilized People	Civilisées	Randa Chahal Sabag	France
Closed Doors	الأبواب المغلقة	Atef Hetata	Egypt
Gemini	双生児	Shinya Tsukamoto	Japan
The Idiot Returns	Návrat idiota	Sasa Gedeon	Czech Republic
Julien Donkey-Boy		Harmony Korine	United States
Libero Burro		Sergio Castellitto	Italy
Nightfall	Abendland	Fred Kelemen	Germany
Ratas, ratones, rateros		Sebastián Cordero	Ecuador
Red Dust	Crvena prasina	Zrinko Ogresta	Croatia
Split Wide Open		Dev Benegal	India
The Sweet Sounds of Life	Il dolce rumore della vita	Giuseppe Bertolucci	Italy
With or Without You		Michael Winterbottom	United Kingdom

=== Dreams and Visions ===
English title	Original title	Director(s)	Production country
Being John Malkovich		Spike Jonze	United States
Criminal Lovers	Les amants criminels	François Ozon	France
Eye of the Beholder		Stephan Elliott	Canada
Fight Club		David Fincher	United States
Guardami		Davide Ferrario	Italy
Hakuchi	白痴	Macoto Tezuka	Japan
Luna Papa	Лунный папа	Bakhtyar Khudojnazarov	Tayikistan
Music of the Heart		Wes Craven	United States
October Sky		Joe Johnston	United States

=== New Territories ===
English title	Original title	Director(s)	Production country
Adwa	አድዋ	Haile Gerima	Ethiopia
The Bird Who Stops in the Air	년 새는 폐곡선을 그린다	Soo-il Jeon	South Korea
Bye Bye Africa		Mahamat-Saleh Haroun	Chad
Cold Lands	Les terres froides	Sébastien Lifshitz	France
The Death of a Composer: Rosa, a Horse Drama		Peter Greenaway	United Kingdom
Diva Dolorosa		Peter Delpeut	Netherlands
Italian Conversation	Conversazione italiana	Alberto Arbasino, Fiorella Infascelli	Italy
The Love of Three Oranges	3 ju zhi lian	Hung Hung	Taiwan
Nasty Neighbours		Debbie Isitt	United Kingdom
Non con un bang		Mariano Lamberti	Italy
The Protagonists		Luca Guadagnino	Italy
Public Enemy		Jens Meurer	France
Ray		Goutam Ghose	India
São Jerônimo		Júlio Bressane	Brasil
La voleuse de Saint-Lubin		Claire Devers	France
Wisconsin Death Trip		James Trip	United Kingdom
Non-fiction
Il denaro non esiste		Ermanno Olmi	Italy
Zion, Auto-Emancipation		Amos Gitai	Israel

== Independent Sections ==
=== Venice International Film Critics' Week ===
The following feature films were selected to be screened as In Competition for this section:

English title	Original title	Director(s)	Production country
A Texas Funeral		William Blake Herron	United States
Franck Spadone		Richard Bean	France
Getting to Know You		Lisanne Skyler	United States
Shadows in the Dark	Karvaan	Pankaj Butalia	India, France
Crane World	Mundo grúa	Pablo Trapero	Argentina
This Is the Garden	Questo è il giardino	Giovanni Maderna	Italy
Millennium Traveler	千年旅人	Hitonari Tsuji	Japan

== Official Awards ==
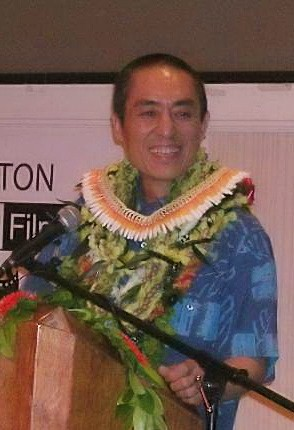
Zhang Yimou, Golden Lion winner for Not One Less

=== Main Competition ===
- Golden Lion: Not One Less by Zhang Yimou
- Grand Special Jury Prize: The Wind Will Carry Us by Abbas Kiarostami
- Silver Lion: Seventeen Years by Zhang Yuan
- Volpi Cup for Best Actor: Jim Broadbent for Topsy-Turvy
- Volpi Cup for Best Actress: Nathalie Baye for Une liaison pornographique
  - Special Mention: Se-tong by Heng Tang
- Marcello Mastroianni Award: Nina Proll for Nordrand

=== Luigi De Laurentis Award ===
- Questo è il giardino by Giovanni Maderna
  - Special Mention: Bye Bye Africa by Mahamat Saleh Haroun

=== Golden Lion for Lifetime Achievement ===
- Jerry Lewis

== Independent Awards ==
=== The President of the Italian Senate's gold medal ===
- Empty Days by Marion Vernoux

=== FIPRESCI Prize ===
- Competition: The Wind Will Carry Us for Abbas Kiarostami
- Parallel Sections: Being John Malkovich for Spike Jonze

=== OCIC Award ===
- Jesus' Son by Alison Maclean
  - Special Award: A Week in the Life of a Man by Jerzy Stuhr
  - Special Award: Seventeen Years by Zhang Yuan

=== UNICEF Award ===
- Not One Less by Zhang Yimou

=== UNESCO Award ===
- Zion, Auto-Emancipation by Amos Gitai
- Civilisées by Randa Chahal Sabag

=== Pasinetti Award ===
- Best Film: Maurizio Zaccaro by Un uomo perbene
- Best Actor: Sergi López i Ayats for Une liaison pornographique
- Best Actress: Valeria Bruni Tedeschi for Empty Days
  - Special Mention: Guo nian hui jia (Zhang Yuan)

=== Pietro Bianchi Award ===
- Dino De Laurentiis

=== Isvema Award ===
- Questo è il giardino by Giovanni Maderna

=== FEDIC Award ===
- The Sweet Sounds of Life by Giuseppe Bertolucci
  - Special Award: Carlo Croccolo for The Protagonists
  - Special Mention: The Protagonists by Luca Guadagnino
  - Special Mention: Típota by Fabrizio Bentivoglio
  - Special Mention: Enzo, domani a Palermo! by Daniele Ciprì and Franco Maresco

=== Little Golden Lion ===
- Jesus' Son by Alison Maclean

=== Anicaflash Prize ===
- Crane World by Pablo Trapero

=== Elvira Notari Prize ===
- Kate Winslet and Jane Campion for Holy Smoke!

=== Cult Network Italia Prize ===
- Crane World by Pablo Trapero

=== FilmCritica "Bastone Bianco" Award ===
- Eyes Wide Shut by Stanley Kubrick

=== Future Film Festival Digital Award ===
- Hakuchi: The Innocent by Macoto Tezuka
  - Special Mention: Being John Malkovich by Spike Jonze

=== Laterna Magica Prize ===
- Yi ge dou bu neng shao by Zhang Yimou

=== Sergio Trasatti Award ===
- Yi ge dou bu neng shao by Zhang Yimou

=== CinemAvvenire Award ===
- Best Film on the Relationship Man-Nature: After the Rain by Takashi Koizumi
- Best Film: Bad ma ra khahad bord by Abbas Kiarostami
- Best First Film: Bye Bye Africa by Mahamat Saleh Haroun
- Cinema for Peace Award: Closed Door by Atef Hetata

=== Children and Cinema Award ===
- Guo nian hui jia by Zhang Yuan
  - Special Mention: Ritratti: Mario Rigoni Stern by Carlo Mazzacurati

=== Rota Soundtrack Award ===
- But Forever in My Mind by Paolo Buonvino

=== Special Director's Award ===
- Zhang Yuan
