= Vincent Boussard =

French opera and theatre director

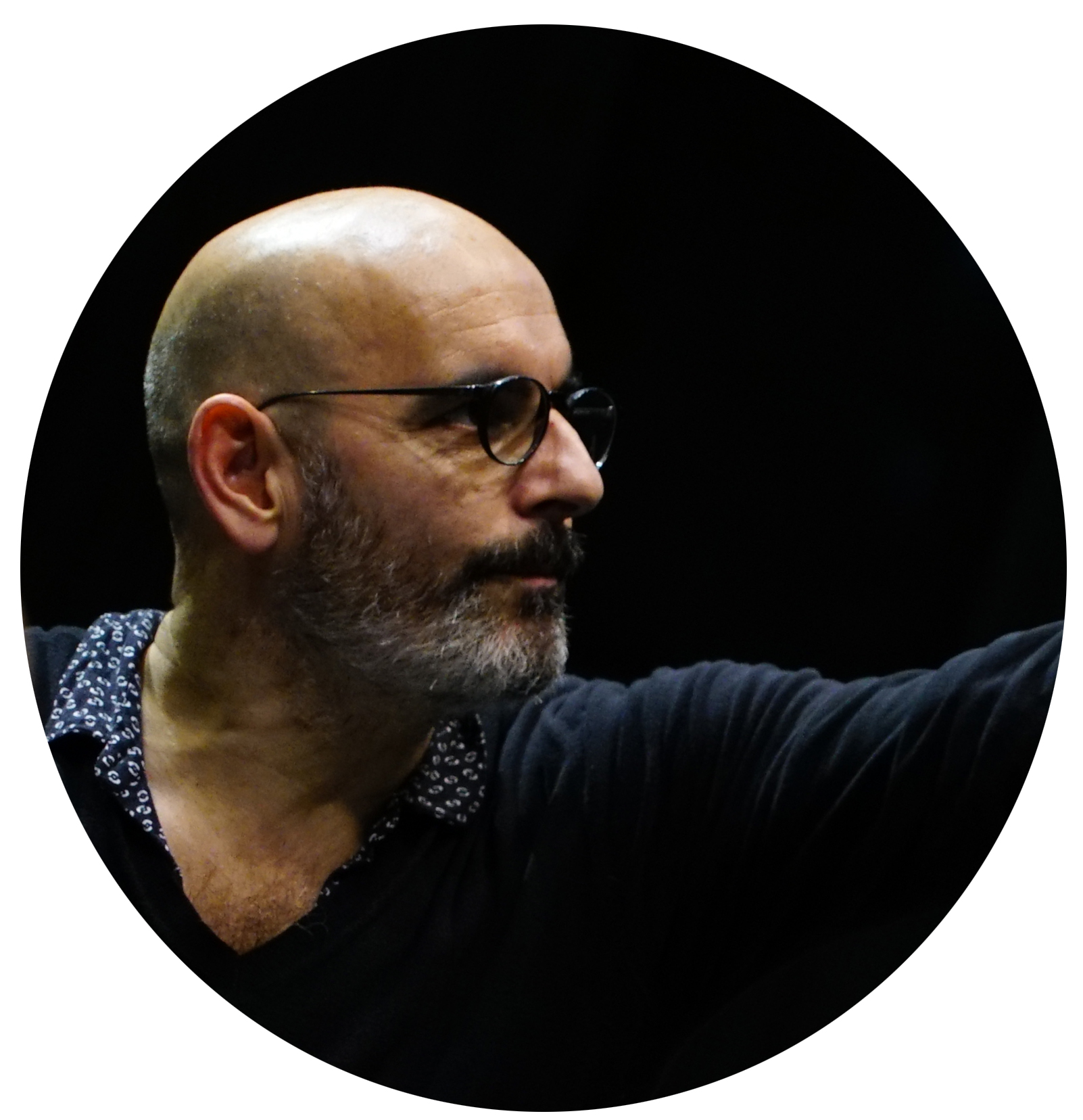
- Boussard in 2018
- Born: 21 April 1969; Angers, France
- Education: Paris Nanterre University
- Occupations: Opera director; Academic
- Awards: Ordre des Arts et des Lettres

Vincent Boussard (born 21 April 1969) is a French opera and theatre director. First a specialist for early opera, he became known for his versions of romantic operas, sometimes in international collaboration. His staging of Massenet's Manon was presented at the Vilnius National Opera, the San Francisco Opera and the Korea National Opera. His production of Bellini's I puritani was shown at the Opéra Royal de Wallonie and the Oper Frankfurt.

== Career ==
Born in Angers, Boussard studied at the Paris Nanterre University and graduated as a Master of Theatre. He was the assistant to several directors in theatre and opera. From 1996 to 2000, he directed the Studio-Théâtre de la Comédie-Française in Paris, where he made his directorial debut in 1999.

Since 2001, he has focused on staging operas, with regular collaborators Christian Lacroix for costumes, Vincent Lemaire for stage design and Guido Levi for light design.

His operatic beginning is marked by close collaborations with William Christie, Teresa Berganza and Bernard Foccroulle, director of the Théâtre Royal de la Monnaie (Brussels) who has regularly invited him.

His productions have since been widely distributed in Europe, including Staatsoper Unter den Linden, Strasbourg Opera House, Liceu of Barcelona, Théâtre du Capitole de Toulouse, Hamburg State Opera. La Monnaie in Brussels, Theater an der Wien, Royal Swedish Opera, Semperoper in Dresden, Saint Gall Theater, Bayerische Staatsoper, Aalto Theatre, and the Opéra de Marseille. He has staged operas in Asia, such as New National Theatre Tokyo, and in the US, including the Brooklyn Academy of Music. He has collaborated with conductors such as Yves Abel, Rinaldo Alessandrini, Lionel Bringuier, Paolo Carignani, Riccardo Frizza, Patrick Fournillier, Daniel Harding, René Jacobs, Alexander Joel, Alessandro De Marchi, Wayne Marshall, Carlo Montanaro, Renato Palumbo, Andreas Spering and Christian Thielemann, among others. He is also invited by festivals such as the Salzburg Easter Festival, Aix-en-Provence Festival, Innsbruck Festival of Early Music, Festival dei due mondi in Spoleto, and Festival Amazonas de Ópera. In international collaboration, his staging of Massenet's Manon began in 2015 at the Vilnius National Opera, and was later also presented at the San Francisco Opera and the Korea National Opera. His production of Bellini's I puritani was jointly shown at the Opéra Royal de Wallonie in Liège and the Oper Frankfurt.

He also stages singers' shows like Christophe (La Route des Mots – 2002) and Alain Bashung (La Tournée des grands espaces – 2004).

In 2009, he was appointed a knight in the Ordre des Arts et des Lettres.

== Staging ==
=== Theatre ===
- 1998: Le Glossaire by Max Rouquette, Studio-Théâtre de la Comédie-Française.
- 1999: Escurial, trois acteurs, un drame... after Michel de Ghelderode, Studio-Théâtre de la Comédie-Française.

=== Opera ===
- 2000: Charpentier: Actéon and Purcell: Dido and Aeneas, les Arts Florissants (cond. William Christie), Paris and New York
- 2001: Mozart: Così fan tutte, Escuela Reina Sofia (cond. Teresa Berganza)
- 2001: Handel: Theodora, Teatro Liceo de Salamanca, Teatro Arriaga de Bilbao
- 2001: Le Jardin des Voix (1st edition), les Arts Florissants
- 2002: Charpentier: La descente d'Orphée aux enfers, Les Arts Florissants
- 2003: Le Carrosse du Saint-Sacrement (after Henri Büsser), Opera studio of the Opéra National de Lyon
- 2003: Mozart: Il re pastore, La Monnaie, Brussels
- 2003: Divertimento Berganza, Opéra Comique, Paris
- 2003: Bizet: Le docteur Miracle, Opera studio of the Opéra de Lyon
- 2004: Cavalli: Eliogabalo, La Monnaie
- 2005: Le Jardin des Voix (2nd edition), Les Arts Florissants
- 2005: Cimarosa: Il matrimonio segreto, Chapelle Reine Elisabeth, La Monnaie
- 2006: Mozart: Così fan tutte, La Monnaie
- 2006: Menotti: Maria Golovin, Opéra de Marseille
- 2006: Mozart: Don Giovanni, Innsbruck Festival of Early Music, Baden-Baden Festival
- 2007: Benoît Mernier; Frühlings Erwachen, La Monnaie
- 2007: Mozart: Le nozze di Figaro, Aix-en-Provence Festival
- 2007: Mazzocchi: La Catena d'Adone, Flanders Opera Studio
- 2008: Menotti: Maria Golovin, Festival Amazonas de Opera, Manaus
- 2008: Tonadilla, Festival de teatro classico, Almagro
- 2008: Pasquini: Sant'Agnese, Innsbruck Festival of Early Music
- 2008: Debussy: Pelléas et Mélisande, Flanders Opera Studio
- 2009: Le Jardin des Voix (4th edition), les Arts Florissants
- 2009: Handel: Floridante, Handel Festival, Halle
- 2009: Charpentier: Louise, Opéra national du Rhin, Strasbourg
- 2010: Handel: Agrippina, Staatsoper Unter den Linden, Berlin
- 2010: Purcell: Dido and Aeneas, Brooklyn Academy of Music, New York
- 2010: Thomas: Hamlet, Opéra de Marseille
- 2011: Bernstein: Candide, Staatsoper Berlin
- 2011: Bellini: I Capuleti e i Montecchi, Bayerische Staatsoper, Munich, San Francisco Opera (2012)
- 2011: Bizet: Carmen, Royal Swedish Opera
- 2012: Cilea: Adriana Lecouvreur, Oper Frankfurt
- 2012: Strauss: Salome, Theater Sankt Gallen
- 2012: Mozart: La finta giardiniera, Aix-en-Provence Festival
- 2012: Puccini: Madama Butterfly, Hamburgische Staatsoper
- 2013: Handel: Radamisto, Theater an der Wien, Vienna
- 2013: Bizet: Les Pêcheurs de perles, Opéra national du Rhin, Strasbourg
- 2013: Gluck: Ezio, Oper Frankfurt
- 2014: Weill: Rise and Fall of the City of Mahagonny, Staatsoper Berlin
- 2014: Donizzeti: La Favorite, Théâtre du Capitole, Toulouse
- 2014: Verdi: Un ballo in maschera, Théâtre du Capitole
- 2014: Mascagni: L'amico Fritz, Opéra National du Rhin, Strasbourg
- 2015: Puccini: La fanciulla del West, Hamburgische Staatsoper
- 2015: Verdi: La traviata, New National Theatre Tokyo
- 2015: Massenet: Manon, Lithuanian National Opera, San Francisco Opera (2017), Korea National Opera, Seoul (2018)* 2016: Verdi: Otello, Salzburg Easter Festival
- 2016: Wagner: Lohengrin (opera), Theater Sankt Gallen
- 2017: Meyerbeer's Le Prophète, Aalto Theatre
- 2017: Verdi: Otello, Staatsoper Dresden
- 2017: Verdi: Un ballo in maschera, Liceu, Lisbon
- 2017: Bellini: I Capuleti e i Montecchi, Lithuanian National Opera
- 2018: Bellini: I puritani, Opéra Royal de Wallonie, Liège, and Oper Frankfurt

=== Shows ===
- 2002: Christophe, La Route des Mots, Olympia (Victoire de la Musique 2002)
- 2004: Alain Bashung, La Tournée des grands espaces Bataclan

== Videos and trailers ==
=== Shows ===
- Excerpt from Alain Bashung's La Tournée des Grands Espaces at the Bataclan in 2004 (Label Barclay Records, genre chanson, 31 titles)
- Les Mots Bleus by Christophe, excerpt from the Olympia 2002 concert, La Route des Mots (Label AZ, genre chanson, 25 titles)

=== Opera ===
- Excerpt from Cavalli's performance ofEliogabalo at the Théâtre Royal de La Monnaie in Brussels in 2004] (dir. René Jacobs)
- Excerpt from Bellini's I Capuleti e i Montecchi at the San Francisco Opera in 2012] (dir. Riccardo Frizza, set design Vincent Lemaire, costumes Christian Lacroix, Lights Guido Levi) (cast Nicole Cabell (Giulietta), Joyce DiDonato (Romeo), Saimir Pirgu (Tebaldo), Eric Owens (Capellio), Ao Li (Lorenzo))
- Excerpt from Verdi's representation of La Traviata at the New National Theatre Tokyo in 2015 (dir. Yves Abel, set design Vincent Lemaire, costumes Vincent Boussard, lights Guido Levi) (cast Bernarda Bobro (Violetta Valery), Antonio Poli (Alfredo Germont), Alfredo Daza (Giorgio Germont), Makiko Yamashita (Flora Bervoix)
- Excerpt from representation of Meyerbeer's The Prophet at the Aalto Theatre of Essen in 2017 (cond. Giuliano Carella], set design, Vincent Lemaire, costumes, Vincent Boussard, Elisabeth de Sauverzac) (cast: John Osborn (Jean de Leyde), Marianne Cornetti (Fidès), Lynette Tapia (Berthe), Martin Ludvik (le comte d’Oberthal), Tijl Faveyts (Zacharie), Pierre Doyen (Mathisen), Albrecht Kludszuweit (Jonas))
