= Civilisées =

Civilisées (A Civilized People)
- Directed by: Randa Chahal Sabag
- Written by: Randa Chahal Sabag
- Produced by: Daniel Toscan du Plantier; Frédéric Sichler
- Starring: Jalila Baccar; Carmen Lebbos; Tamim Chahal; Myra Maakaron; Bruno Todeschini
- Cinematography: Ricardo Jacques; Gale Breidi; Roby Breidi
- Edited by: Juliette Weifling
- Music by: Ziad Rahbani
- Production company: Euripide Productions
- Release date: September 4, 1999 (Venice Film Festival)
- Running time: 97 minutes
- Country: Lebanon
- Languages: Arabic; French

Civilisées (A Civilized People or Al Mutahaddirat) is a 1999 Lebanese dark comedy drama film written and directed by filmmaker Randa Chahal Sabag. The film premiered at the Venice Film Festival on September 4, 1999 and later screened at the Toronto International Film Festival. The film was also screened at the Arab Film Festival in San Francisco, California.

== Premise ==
During the Lebanese Civil War (1975-1990), many well-off Lebanese families fled the country to look for their personal interests internationally, leaving their residences under the care of maids and laborers from Egypt, the Philippines and Sri Lanka. The film draws a portrait of a war-tormented Beirut neighborhood, and the love between a Muslim militia fighter and a Christian maid.

== Cast ==
- Jalila Baccar as Viviane
- Tamim Chahal as Samir
- Myrna Maakaron as Souad
- Carmen Lebbos as Najat
- Sotigui Kouyaté as Ousmane
- Renée Deek as Thérèse
- Bruno Todeschini as Antoine

== Release ==
Due to the controversial topic of the film and its critique of the Lebanese elite, it had only one screening in Lebanon at the Beirut International Film Festival, and was also later banned by the Lebanese Film Commission. However, it received positive responses from international audiences, including at film festivals in Italy, France, and Canada.

== Accolades ==
In 2000, the film won the Nestor Almendros Award at the Human Rights Watch International Film Festival. At the 1999 Venice Film Festival, the film won the UNESCO Award (tied with Zion, Auto-Emancipation) and was nominated for the Cinema of the Present - Lion of the Year Award.
