= Holy Smoke! =

1999 film by Jane Campion

- Theatrical release poster
- Directed by: Jane Campion
- Written by: Anna Campion; Jane Campion
- Produced by: Jan Chapman
- Starring: Kate Winslet; Harvey Keitel
- Cinematography: Dion Beebe
- Edited by: Veronika Jenet
- Music by: Angelo Badalamenti
- Distributed by: Miramax Films (Note: Distributed in Australia in association with Roadshow Film Distributors.)
- Release dates: 4 September 1999 (Venice); 3 December 1999 (United States); 26 December 1999 (Australia)
- Running time: 115 minutes
- Countries: Australia; United States
- Language: English
- Box office: $3.6 million

Holy Smoke! is a 1999 independent romantic comedy drama film directed by Jane Campion, and starring Kate Winslet and Harvey Keitel. The plot follows an American exit counselor (Keitel) who attempts to deprogram a young Australian woman (Winslet) who has been indoctrinated into a new age cult in India. Julie Hamilton, Tim Robertson, Daniel Wyllie, and Pam Grier appear in supporting roles.

Director Jane Campion wrote the screenplay for the film with her sister, Anna Campion. The film was a co-production between Australia and the United States. The film premiered at the 56th Venice International Film Festival and was shown at the New York Film Festival and the Taipei Golden Horse Film Festival before being released theatrically.

== Plot ==
During a trip to India, Ruth Barron has a spiritual awakening and embraces the teachings of a guru named Baba. Back home in the Sydney suburb of Sans Souci, her parents are appalled to learn their daughter now answers to the name Nazni and has no intention of returning. They concoct a tale about her father Gilbert having had a stroke and being on the verge of death, and her mother Miriam travels to India in hopes of persuading her to come home, with no success until she suffers a serious asthma attack. Ruth agrees to accompany her to Australia on her return flight.

Meanwhile, Miriam has arranged a phony reunion with Gilbert in the Outback, claiming to Ruth that he is recuperating there. Gilbert, as well as Ruth's brothers Robbie—along with his promiscuous wife Yvonne—and Tim—along with his male lover, Yani—all convene at a nearby resort. There, they meet with P.J. Waters, a famous American exit counselor who deprograms members of religious cults. Ruth arrives, and goes to visit her father at a farm; there, she is confronted by her family along with P.J., who have staged an intervention. Ruth is defiant and attempts to fight them, but ultimately relents and agrees to accompany P.J. for a treatment session, under the provision that she may return to India once they have finished.

Ruth departs with P.J. to a remote cabin where he isolates her and begins to challenge her faith in Baba, exposing that Baba's doctrines have been directly copied from Hinduism. During the first night, Yvonne, who is staying nearby, arrives to bring a change of clothes for Ruth, and performs oral sex on P.J. The following morning, Ruth is angered when she finds P.J. has strung her sari up in a tree, and retaliates by forming a "HELP" signal out of stones. Later, P.J. takes Ruth to visit her family, and they all screen a documentary exposing the tactics of cults, including the Manson family, Heaven's Gate, and the Rajneesh.

That night, after returning to the cabin, P.J. awakens to find a distressed, naked Ruth has lit the tree and her sari on fire. Ruth propositions P.J., and the two have sex; Ruth asks P.J. "Don't come, don't come", but P.J. still comes. In the morning, Yvonne, Tim, and Yani arrive to bring Ruth to a party, which P.J. accompanies her on. When they return, a drunken Ruth insults P.J.'s manhood before ordering him to perform oral sex on her. The next morning, P.J's assistant and lover, Carol, arrives from the United States, chastising him for screening her phone calls, and demanding he return home. She ultimately agrees to the deprogramming session lasting one more day. Ruth begins to taunt P.J. and emasculates him by making him wear a dress, but relents when he responds by writing the phrase "Be Kind" on her forehead; she is suddenly overcome with guilt and begins crying, confessing that she does not allow anyone to become emotionally close to her.

Ruth decides to leave, but P.J., who believes himself to be in love with her, attempts to stop her. The two have a physical altercation in which he punches her, knocking her unconscious. P.J. leaves with an unconscious Ruth in the boot of his car. On the road, he encounters Tim, Robbie, and Yvonne en route to the cabin. P.J. tells them Ruth has fled, and that they should separate and search for her. Yvonne insists she accompany P.J., who reluctantly allows her in the car. As they drive, Yvonne hears Ruth banging on the lid of the boot, and orders him to stop the car. She lets Ruth out of the boot, and she begins running into the bush, with P.J. pursuing her on foot, proclaiming his love for her. P.J. eventually collapses of exhaustion in the heat, and has a vision of Ruth as the Durga before Yvonne, Tim, and Robbie come to his and Ruth's aid. Ruth departs with Yvonne, Tim, and Robbie, along with P.J., whom they place in the bed of the truck. During the drive, Ruth asks them to stop the truck. She gets into the bed with P.J., and comforts him.

A year later, Ruth writes to P.J. from Jaipur, where she is now living with her mother, after her father left her for his secretary. Ruth explains to P.J. that she is still seeking spirituality, and has recently completed reading the Bhagavad Gita. She now has a boyfriend, but confesses she still loves P.J. "from afar." Back in the United States, P.J. responds to Ruth, explaining that he and Carol now have twin sons, though he too confesses a love for her.

== Cast ==
- Kate Winslet as Ruth Barron
- Harvey Keitel as P.J. Waters
- Julie Hamilton as Miriam Barron
- Tim Robertson as Gilbert Barron
- Kerry Walker as Puss
- Leslie Dayman as Bill-Bill
- Sophie Lee as Yvonne Barron
- Daniel Wyllie as Robbie Barron
- Paul Goddard as Tim Barron
- Austen Tayshus as Stan
- Pam Grier as Carol
- Samantha Murray as Prue
- Dhritiman Chatterjee as Chidaatma Baba
- Hari Om Sharan as a singer (cameo)
- Luke Testa as Boyfriend
- Tamsin Carroll as Jodie
- Genevieve Lemon as Rahi

== Production ==
The film was made on location in Paharganj in Delhi and Pushkar in India and Sydney and Hawker in the Flinders Ranges in South Australia. Interiors were filmed at Fox Studios Australia.

Angelo Badalamenti's soundtrack is performed by artists including Annie Lennox, Alanis Morissette, Burt Bacharach, Neil Diamond and Chloe Goodchild.

== Release ==
=== Box office ===
In the United States, the film was initially given a limited release on 3 December 1999, earning $33,307 its opening weekend. The release expanded to a total of 93 cinemas, ultimately grossing $1,758,780 at the U.S. box office. The film earned a further $1,380,029 during its theatrical release in Australia. The film's worldwide box office gross totaled $3,580,723.

=== Critical response ===
Holy Smoke! received mixed reviews from critics, holding a 46% rating on Rotten Tomatoes based on 82 reviews. The critical consensus on the website reads, "Superb performances hindered by weak script and incoherent story." On Metacritic, it receives an average score of 57 out of 100 based on 30 reviews, indicating "mixed or average reviews".

In her review in The New York Times, Janet Maslin said, "As Holy Smoke moves from its early mix of rapture and humor into [the] more serious, confrontational stage, it runs into trouble . . . the screenplay . . . threatens to become heavy-handedly ideological beneath its outward whimsy . . . it turns out to be more fundamentally conventional than might be expected . . . Shot so beautifully by Dion Beebe that it seems bathed in divine light, [the film] has a sensual allure that transcends its deep-seated ponderousness. The richly colored Indian scenes have a hallucinogenic magic, while exquisite desert vistas radiate an attunement with nature. And the steamily claustrophobic look of the intense scenes between Ms. Winslet and Keitel have an eroticism that will not surprise viewers of The Piano."

In his review, Roger Ebert of the Chicago Sun-Times gave the film 2 and a half stars out of 4. He observed, "It's a little surprising, although not boring, when it turns from a mystic travelogue into a feminist parable . . . Winslet and Keitel are both interesting in the film, and indeed Winslet seems to be following Keitel's long-standing career plan, which is to go with intriguing screenplays and directors and let stardom take care of itself . . . A smaller picture like this, shot out of the mainstream, has a better chance of being quirky and original. And quirky it is, even if not successful."

In Variety, David Rooney stated, "Original in every sense, this often difficult film about family, relationships, sexual politics, spiritual questing, faith and obsession further explores the director's abiding fascinations in excitingly unconventional terms. Mainstream audiences may be unwilling to surrender to the pull of a unique journey that strips away its characters' masks and refuses easy solutions, and many men especially will find it too confronting. But others will embrace its thematic and stylistic complexity as qualities all too rare in contemporary cinema."

Bob Graham of the San Francisco Chronicle said, "Holy Smoke sometimes has the mentality, for better or worse, of an encounter group. It also has a terrific subject and the spirit to bring it off."

=== Accolades ===
At the Venice Film Festival, Jane Campion and Kate Winslet won the Elvira Notari Prize. Campion was nominated for the Golden Lion but lost to Zhang Yimou for Not One Less.

== See also ==
- Cinema of Australia
