= The Gallant Lords of Bois-Doré =

- French: Les Beaux Messieurs de Bois-Doré
- Based on: Les Beaux Messieurs de Bois-Doré by George Sand
- Written by: Bernard Borderie; Jacques Armand; Maurice Toesca
- Directed by: Bernard Borderie
- Starring: Georges Marchal; Yolande Folliot; Michel Albertini; Michel Creton
- Music by: Georges Garvarentz
- Country of origin: France
- Original language: French
- No. of episodes: 5

Production
- Cinematography: Michel Carré
- Editor: Lucienne Barthelemy

Original release
- Network: Antenne 2
- Release: 18 December 1976 – 15 January 1977

The Gallant Lords of Bois-Doré (Les Beaux Messieurs de Bois-Doré) is a 1976 French television serial based on the 1857 historical novel by George Sand directed by Bernard Borderie. Along with the films about Angélique it is considered one of the most successful works of this director.

== Synopsis ==
The serial consists of 5 parts. The first part introduces Sylvain, Marquis of Bois-Doré, a companion-in-arms of late king Henry IV of France. Following his sovereign the marquis had to abjure his Calvinist faith and adopt Catholicism though he secretly sympathizes with Protestants. After the king's death he retired and went to his castle of Bois-Doré. The marquis feels deep love for Lauriane de Beuvre, a daughter of his friend and neighbour, 30 years younger than him. Guillaume d'Ars, Sylvain's cousin, introduces to him a certain Villaréal, a Spanish nobleman.

The second part concentrates on relations between Bois-Doré, Lauriane, and Villaréal. The latter has found out that the marquis hides in the castle treasures of Protestants and begins to search for them. Besides Villareal pays his addresses to Lauriane. Bois-Doré challenges him to a duel and kills him.

The third part tells about Mario, an 18 old youth whom the marquis saved from mercenaries. Mario has striking resemblance to marquis's brother who was lost 18 years ago. Bois-Doré finds evidence of Mario being his nephew and proclaims him an heir to his title and estate. The handsome boy wins Lauriane's affection.

The fourth part focuses on relations between Bois-Doré, Lauriane, and Mario. The latter falls in love with Lauriane whose heart is torn by sincere respect for noble, generous but elderly Sylvain and affection to young Mario.

The fifth part tells about hostilities between France and Spain, in which Sylvain and Mario take an active part. Mario has been severely wounded in action and Lauriane realizes that she cannot live without him.

== Reviews ==
The serial is distinguished by an entertaining plot, superb acting of G.Marchal (Sylvain) and Y. Folliot (Lauriane), picturesque scenery, and accurate representation of historical background.

“This is an eventful yarn, involving many subplots, it is par excellence the perfect swashbuckler, which after being popular in the first part of the sixties in the French theaters became mini-series in the seventies..”

== Cast ==
- Georges Marchal — Sylvain de Bois Doré
- Yolande Folliot — Lauriane de Beuvre
- Michel Albertini — Mario de Brion de Bois Doré
- Michel Creton — Skiara d'Alminar Villaréal
- Philippe Lemaire — Adamas
- François Maistre — Poulain
- Jean-François Poron — Guillaume d'Ars
- Jean Martinelli — M. de Beuvre
- Marion Game — Belinde / Prosperine
- Olivier Hussenot — Jovelin
- Patrick Préjean — La Fleche
