= The Walk (novella) =

1917 novella by Robert Walser

The Walk (German: Der Spaziergang) is a 1917 novella by the Swiss writer Robert Walser. It narrates a walk full of perceptual impressions, philosophical musings, and several pranks with townspeople. It was first published in 1917, then in a second edition heavily revised by Walser in 1920. The 1917 version was translated into English by Christopher Middleton and published in 1957 by John Calder.

It is considered an iconic work of Walser and of flaneur literature. The English-language publication of The Walk and Other Stories in 1957 is considered a key event in recognition of Walser as a significant figure of literary modernism, not only in English-language awareness but also in Swiss and German-language scholarship as Walser had been largely forgotten in the World War II era.

== Background ==
Walser was known for walks during which he appreciated nature or the city, exercised, and gathered material for his writing, including on 18 mile hikes from Bern to Thun. Susan Sontag has described Walser's work generally as "portraits of consciousness walking about in the world, enjoying its 'morsel of life,' radiant with despair."

William H. Gass has described Walser's life as, in part, "observant idling, city strolling, mountain hikes, and woodland walks, a life lived on the edges of lakes, on the margins of meadows, on the verges of things, a life in slow but constant motion, at a gawker's pace: sad, removed, amused, ironic, obsessively reflexive."

Translator and scholar Susan Bernofsky identifies the short piece “Lake Greifen” (1898) as Walser's first story of a walk. In the words of Cigdem Asatekin, this story "has the narrator leave a big and famous lake behind and walk to appreciate the eponymous, smaller lake. He [at one point says that he] “glances at lovely flowers, and that’s all.” But that’s not all."

== Publication History ==
- 1917 - The Walk was first published in German as Der Spaziergang as a stand-alone book
- 1920 - A second comprehensively-revised version in the collection Seeland.
- 1957 - Der Spaziergang appears in an English translation by the poet and scholar Christopher Middleton, in a collection titled The Walk and Other Stories, published by Calder Publishing (see below).
- 1982 - All stories from the 1957 English publication The Walk and Other Stories are re-printed within the 1982 collection Selected Stories together with about 40 other pieces by Walser. Published by Farrar, Straus, and Giroux.
- 2012 - A new revised English translation by Susan Bernofsky published by New Directions Press. It uses the 1957 Middleton translation as a base but adds in all of Walser's revisions from the 1920 German edition, which Middleton had not known about in 1955-1957. The revision had Middleton's approval and both translators are officially credited.
- 2013 - A re-print of Selected Stories (1982), including the foreword by Susan Sontag and all included prose pieces, but re-titled as a volume The Walk and Other Stories which is completely different from the 1957 book of the same name. It uses the un-revised 1957 translation of The Walk based on the unrevised 1917 German edition. Published by Serpent's Tail.

=== The Walk and Other Stories (1957) ===
The 1957 English-language book The Walk and Other Stories, translated by Christopher Middleton, contained Walser's "The Walk" and three other stories. It was the first translation of Walser's work. Walser was largely unknown in the English-speaking world before this point, but Middleton discovered his work while in Zurich. Carl Seelig stated that Walser responded to the news (around 1955) of the translation project with a Swiss German equivalent of "My, my" (meaning, "Well, look at that"). Middleton said that Seelig rewarded him with encouragement words and cognac.

Middleton has been described by German-language literary scholars as not only the first translator of Robert Walser, but the key person (including German-language and Swiss scholars) in the recognition of Walser as a literary figure of modernism in the time period after Walser had been forgotten around or during World War II. Weber-Henking similarly argued that Middleton's publication of The Walk and Other Stories at Calder Publishing brought Walser into "the vicinity of the nouveau roman ["new novel" era], Samuel Beckett, and the English avant-garde." Leucht states that the rediscovery of Walser, even within Swiss German literary discussion, "was made possible thanks to Christopher Middleton's 1957 translation."

In the 1957 introduction, Middleton described the styles of Walser and Kafka as:

"[A] firm rejection of convention and of conventional perspectives, and a pronounced heretical tendency to burlesque and parody these perspectives on the slightest provocation, substituting for them a new body of imaginative forms. [...] forever leaping the norm. [...] forerunners of the spectral "minimalism" of Samuel Beckett."

— Excerpt from Christopher Middleton's introduction to the 1957 English edition

==== Contents ====
- "Frau Wilke" (1918) First appeared in Poetenleben
- "Kleist in Thun" (1914) First appeared in Geschichten
- "The Monkey" (1925) First appeared in Die Rose
- "The Walk" (1917) First appeared in German as its own volume

== Style and themes ==
Andrea Scrima has written that "Walser’s writing cunningly masquerades irony with self-effacement [...]. Embodied in the figure of the bedraggled walker/poet, an almost baroque politesse spills over into the incongruous, the obsequious, and the disconcerting. [It's] articulated in a language of hallucinatory virtuosity. Scrima also disagrees with Walter Benjamin's statement that Walser's style "finds meager lanterns of hope" in the night, and instead detects a non-meager "exultation the writer feels when he perceives the sublime in the tiniest details of everyday life."

Simon Willis at Foxed Quarterly wrote that Walser is "a writer of both tragic and exultant modesty. [The Walk] consists of digressions, flights of fancy, mundane appointments and fantastic imagination, and much of its energy comes from its wandering tone. Following his switches from sarcasm to confession can feel like trailing someone through a forest, glimpsing him here, then there."

Tom Whalen believes that the narrator's line, "Although I may cut a most carefree figure, I am highly serious and conscientious, and though I seem to be no more than delicate and dreamy, I am a solid technician!" offers an accurate take on Walser's writing process.

== Reception ==
Chris Power at The Guardian wrote in 2008, "The Walk [tailor scene is] one of the funniest passages of apoplectic complaint I have read. But this hilarity seems a faint memory when, at its conclusion, the story's tone shifts to evoke life's bleakness with a sudden, awful simplicity."

Mariya Popova at The Marginalian called the story "a deeply enjoyable read in its entirety." She said, "it ironizes pretense, ironizes sincerity, yet leaves the reader with something sincere, unpretentious, and unironic. [...] Over and over, the reader is swayed by Walser’s defining dance of artifice and authenticity as he parodies [...] various forms of posturing [...]."

David Evans at The Independent wrote that The Walk represents Walser's offbeat prose style: "ostensibly it is an account of a countryside stroll, but the narrator continually pauses and digresses ("But stop! Uninterrupted writing fatigues, like digging") and the pace slows to a strange, languorous rallentando." Evans speculated that Walser's obscurity in Britain may owe to the "offbeat prose style, which takes some getting used to."

== Plot ==
One morning, the narrator feels the desire to take a walk and leaves his writing room to hurry into the street. He is delighted by seemingly new sights outside, and forgets his sorrows and writer's block, but he senses something grave ahead of him and behind him.

In addition to many different sights and perceptions, the narrator has absurdly elegant and polite conversations (seemingly ironic yet passionately sincere at the same time) with a bookseller, a banker, a tailor, and a tax officer. He pranks the bookseller by asking repeated enthusiastic questions about the book that the bookseller has suggested, then leaving without buying it. At the bank, an official gives a report of a 1,000 franc deposit from some ladies, and expresses in an absurdly evasive way that the narrator needs the money. The narrator replies with a speech about the modesty of his finances and the misfortune of human life.

The narrator emphasizes that he is on a normal modest road in a poor quarter, not in a park, a concept that he criticizes. He notes factories, workshops, farms, hammering, and fruit trees. A good-natured but superficially scary-looking dog has caused a child to cry. Children are playing, and he comments that children are in heaven but lose the heaven as they grow older. He criticizes that there's nowhere for poor folk to play but the road, where cars are intrusive and dangerous, and explains his reasons for disliking cars. To a random woman, he makes a extravagant speech expressing that she must be an actress. She gives kind happy replies.

When a ladies' hatmaking shop and fashion salon dazzle him, he states that he will write a fantasy-like piece titled "The Walk" that sketches everything he is seeing.

On the topic of reading news at public houses, he obliquely mentions war (Note: The narrator doesn't mention the specific war, but World War 1 was occurring at the time of writing and publication) and compares the pitilessness of warring nations with the pitilessness of the reading public toward writers. He also describes "pickpocket"-like quick sensory impressions of things including vegetables in gardens, flowers, trees, beans, crops, wood shavings, grass, streams, banners on a clubhouse, and strawberries. He encounters a large man who he knows, Tomzack, who he describes in a supernatural ominous way. He goes to a pine forest and has an unnamable feeling in his soul. Later, a young girl suddenly starts joyfully singing in a house window, which he describes with sublimity.

He goes to a lunch appointment at the home of Frau Aebi. She plays an unnerving prank on him where she forces him to eat more and more food, creepily refuses normal conversation, and stares at him with a look of devotion. Eventually she reveals it was a joke about housewives who are ridiculously over-hospitable. The narrator writes that he likes her, but has to leave for more errands.

He explains to the reader that master tailors have a strong self-possession and that "toppling" a master tailor's steady mind is one of the most difficult tasks. But because he has a fear of tailors, he first goes to the post office to mail a letter, which is a long scathingly critical sociological indictment to a wealthy person. At the master tailor's, Herr Dunn, he tries on a suit that the firm has been making for him. Herr Dunn is confident, but the narrator gives a lengthy point-by-point speech about how astoundingly bad the suit is. The tailor replies mostly with a firm professional defense. The narrator says that nothing can be accomplished and leaves.

At the tax office, he makes a wordy speech to the President of the Commission for Revenues and requests a lower tax rate. When the tax officer objects that he's always out for a walk, the narrator gives a long intense exploration of a walking writer's methods, the need to observe the world and find material, the cruelty and quantity of critics, and more. The tax officer says that the request will be examined and sends him to continue on his walk.

The narrator waits with a crowd at a railroad crossing for a train to pass. He says this is the peak or center of the walk, and that the walk will now decline. He has a sublime experience in the countryside. He looks in on a schoolroom and wishes that he was a student again. He makes a poetic condemnation of countrymen who cut down nut trees for money. He then apologizes for specific phrases that he used. A chateaux and palace comes into his view and discussion, including architecture and a garden pool with a large sheatfish. He envisions what the castle would be like at night, but is disrupted by an automobile. He walks on and gives a "facetious" speech to a dog. He discusses a dandy, a charwoman, architectural decoration, and his view on the manic use of flower decorations. At a chapel, he recalls Godwi by Clemens Brentano. He looks at a villa and is reminded of Karl Stauffer-Bern and also Tiergartenstraße.

He notes the coming evening and the coming end of the walk, a piano factory, people, poplars next to a river, electric trams with marshalls peering out, a troupe of cows, peasant women on farm carts, beer barrel wagons, a mass of workers going home, a wandering circus with elephants and giraffes, a man obnoxiously singing "A Hundred Thousand Frogs", (Note: The song referred to may be related to Små grodorna which is documented in Swedish but is also known to be an English corruption of a French song, with "frog" being an English slur for the French. The translator and the translation are English, so the song may have been changed to clearly capture a slur in English) woodsmen, splendid pigs that make the narrator imagine roast pork, and two girls who the narrator can only identify as either Bohemian, Galician, Slav, Wend, or Gypsy, which reminds him of The Gypsy Princess and of Preziosa. (Note: The name "Preziosa" is also mentioned in Walser's short story "The Monkey")

He lists several signs and advertisements including "Maggi's Unsurpassed Soups" and also a "FULL BOARD AND LODGING" sign that has an absurdly lengthy classist elitist policy and sales pitch posted under it. The narrator transcribes the policy across several pages and it clearly sounds like the narrator's writing style. He admits the reader doubts the authenticity, and explains his belief that human life is a "charming flow of fleeting approximations."

He criticizes novelty-hunters who need to be delighted by completely new things. In the evening, he comes to a quiet side road and says the walk will end at the lake. He notes a group of schoolchildren receiving a botany lesson in the night.

He describes a sad lonely welling-up of memories about his past failings, character flaws, frailties, in a "past life." He remembers seeing a forsaken deathly pale man lying on the ground a few days earlier. He remembers a lost love. He drops several flowers that he had picked, and goes home because it's late and dark.

== Legacy ==
It was the main inspiration for the found-footage film All This Can Happen (2012) by Siobhan Davies and David Hinton and the Rome-set COVID-19 film The Walk (2021) by Giovanni Maderna.
