= Goodchild =

Goodchild is an English regional surname originating in East Anglia and may refer to:

- Chloe Goodchild, British musician
- David Goodchild (born 1976), English cricketer
- Doreen Goodchild (1900–1998), South Australian artist
- Gary Goodchild (born 1958), English footballer
- George Goodchild (1888–1969), British writer
- Jim Goodchild (1892–1950), English footballer
- John Goodchild (1851–1914), British physician, poet and mystic, author of Light of the West
- John C. Goodchild (1898–1980), South Australian artist
- Johnny Goodchild (1939–2011), English footballer
- Michael F. Goodchild (born 1944), British-American geographer
- Peter Goodchild (1939–2025), BBC television producer and editor
- Richard Goodchild (1918-1968), British provincial Roman archeologist
- Ronald Goodchild (1910–1998), Anglican bishop of Kensington
- Tim Goodchild, British set designer
- William Goodchild (born 1964), British musician and composer

In fiction

- Trevor Goodchild, fictional character in the MTV cartoon Æon Flux
