= Les Beaux Messieurs de Bois-Doré =

1857 novel by George Sand

Les Beaux Messieurs de Bois-Doré is an 1857 French historical novel by George Sand.

== History ==
The work was first published as a serial in Le Progrès Illustré in 1857, then was revived in volume by A. Cadot in 1858.

The novel tells a series of romantic and adventurous adventures in the context of religious oppositions during the reign of Louis XIII.

== Adaptations ==
Theatre

The work was adapted to the stage by Sand and Paul Meurice. The premiere took place on 26 April 1862 at the Théâtre de l'Ambigu-Comique.

On television

- 1976: The Gallant Lords of Bois-Doré, French miniseries directed by Bernard Borderie, with Georges Marchal, Yolande Folliot and Michel Albertini
