= Chloé Mons =

French actress and singer

- Born: 1 December 1972 (age 53); Lille, France
- Occupations: Actress, singer
- Spouse: Alain Bashung (m. 2001–2009)
- Children: 1

Chloé Mons (born in Lille on 1 December 1972) is a French actress and singer.

== Biography ==
Chloé grew up in Lille in a family of musicians. She is the sister of Barnabé Mons, the leader of the psychedelic rock group Sheetah & Les Weissmullers. She later modeled for the American photographer Tom Sewell.

In 2006, inspired by Calamity Jane's Letters to My Daughter, she wrote and composed La Ballade de Calamity Jane. Alain Bashung, her husband, and Rodolphe Burger, the guitarist and leader of the band Kat Onoma, helped bring the project to life. In the same year, she published her debut solo album, Chienne d'un seul, which she performed on stage during the first part of her husband's tour, La Tournée des grands espaces. In 2009, she wrote, composed and self-produced her second solo album, Par la rivière, an opus she defines as punk and country that she has played alone and with a small band in France as well as the United States.

Her third solo album, Walking, was recorded at the end of 2010 in Kingston, New York, and produced by Malcolm Burn, who has worked with Bob Dylan, Iggy Pop, and Emmylou Harris among others. She toured with the new album, accompanied by guitarist Yan Péchin.

After her husband Alain Bashung's death in 2009, Mons published a diary-style book recounting her husband's final hours. The book, Let Go, was released on 2 March 2012, published by Fetjaine.

2012 also marked the release of Il Buio, a duet album with the guitarist Xavier Boussiron. The album comprises covers of various hits from the 1950s, from Peggy Lee's "Johnny Guitar" to Adriano Celentano's "Ciao Ragazzi". Salvatore Adamo also collaborated with Mons to remix his song, "La Notte". n November 2012, Mons reunited with the production team fromWalking to record Soon, before leaving for southern India, Mysore, and Karnataka to film "American Diary", "My California", and "Mysore Express".

In 2016, she played Dominique in Alain Klingler's musical, Je n’ai rien contre le réveillon.

The same year, she released her eighth album, Alectrona, an album of fusion music between rock 'n roll with chamber music. The album contains ten songs, all written and composed by Mons. The album was produced by Blixa Bargeld

== Personal life ==
Mons is the sister of Barnabé Mons, leader of the Lille-based psychedelic rock band Sheetah & Les Weissmullers. In 2001, she married fellow singer Alain Bashung, whom she met while shooting the music video La nuit je mens. They created a recording of the Song of Songs for their marriage, set to music by Rodolphe Burger. They have a daughter named Poppée.

== Filmography ==
- 1999: The Passengers by Jean-Claude Guiguet
- 1999: Empty Days by Marion Vernoux
- 2000: Tontaine and Tonton by Tonie Marshall (TV)
- 2000: Drug Scenarios by Marion Vernoux ( Drugstore Segment )
- 2000: Confusion of Genders by Ilan Duran Cohen
- 2001: Art (delicate) of seduction by Richard Berry
- 2001: On my lips by Jacques Audiard
- 2002: My camera and me by Christophe Loizillon
- 2002: La Mentale by Manuel Boursinhac
- 2003: Motus directed by Laurence Ferreira Barbosa (TV)
- 2003: It's Easier for a Camel... by Valeria Bruni-Tedeschi
- 2003: The Cost of Living by Philippe Le Guay
- 2008: Sweet Valentine by Emma Luchini
- 2012: Grand Evening of Gustave Kervern and Benoît Delépine

== Discography ==
- 2001: Le Rock: Max et le rock (1 book + 1 audio CD), by Leigh Sauerwein, Laurent Corvaisier, Rodolphe Burger and Chloé Mons
- 2002: Cantique des Cantiques, with Alain Bashung
- 2006: La Ballade de Calamity Jane by Chloé Mons, Alain Bashung and Rodolphe Burger
- 2006: Chienne d'un seul
- 2009: Par la rivière
- 2011: Walking
- 2012: Il Buio with Xavier Boussiron
- 2012: Soon
- 2014: Alectrona
- 2018: Hôtel de l'univers
