= Giovanni Maderna =

Italian film director (born 1973)

Giovanni Davide Maderna
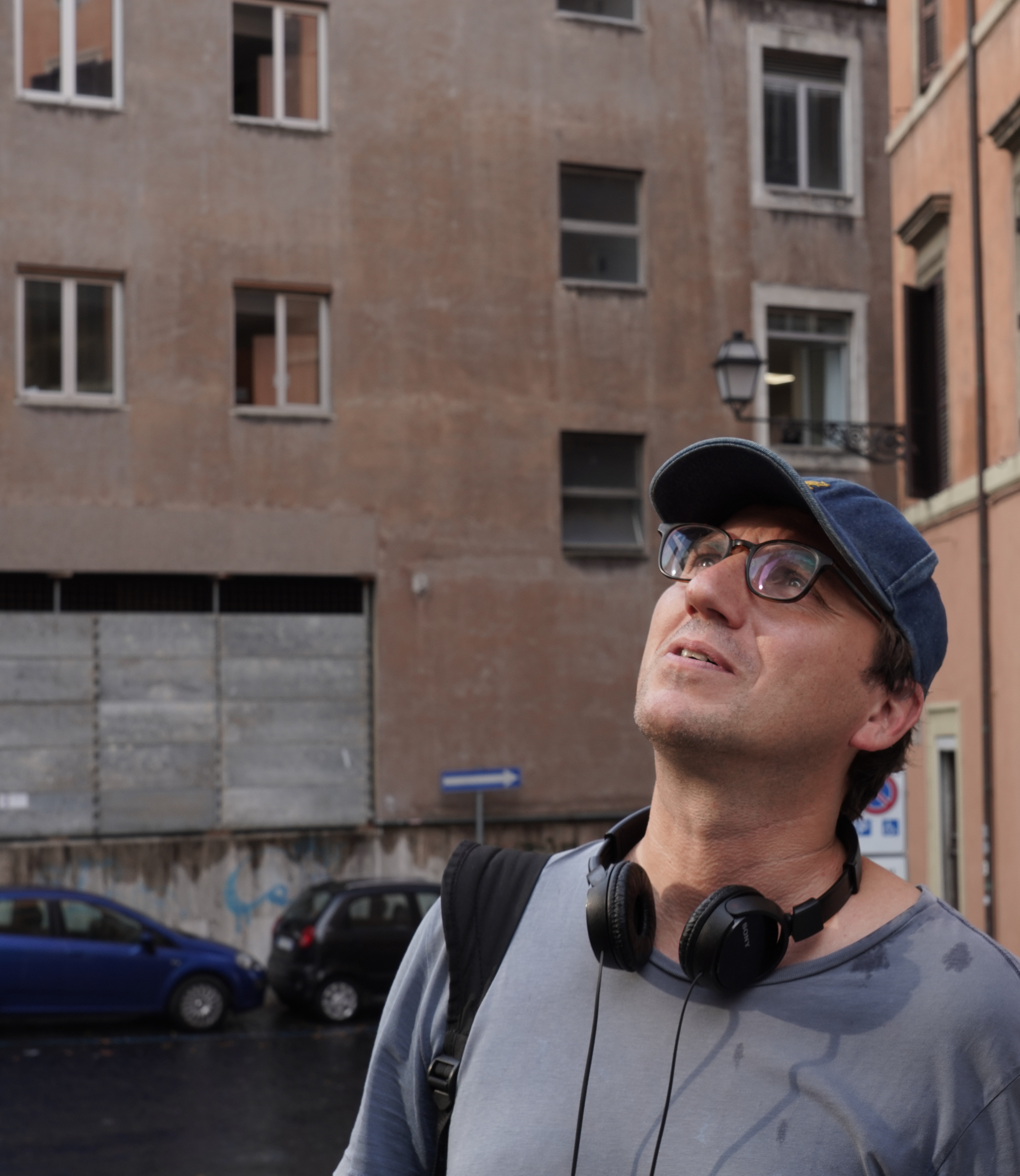
- Giovanni Maderna filming The Walk in September 2020. Photograph by Margherita Panizon
- Born: 2 October 1973; Milan, Lombardy, Italy
- Occupations: Film director, screenwriter, actor

Giovanni Davide Maderna (Milan, 1973) is an Italian film director, writer and producer.

== Life and work ==
In 1995, Maderna directed his first short film, La Place, in Lyon, France, joint winner at Nanni Moretti's Sacher Festival. After a few other short films and after attending the Centro Sperimentale di Cinematografia in Rome, in 1999 his first feature film This is the garden (Questo è il giardino) won the Leone del futuro – Premio Venezia opera prima "Luigi De Laurentiis" award for Best Debut Film at Venice Film Festival. Then he directed Imperfect Love (L'amore imperfetto, 2001) which also premiered at Venice Film Festival.

His third film Schopenhauer (2006) was in the competition "Filmmakers of the present" at Locarno Film Festival and premiered in the US at Lincoln Center in New York in June 2007. Four years later Heaven without Earth (Cielo senza terra 2010), co-directed with Sara Pozzoli, premiered in Competition at Venice Days (Giornate degli Autori). The film has been broadcast by Rai Tre cult programme Fuori Orario simultaneously with the first screening at the festival and was then nominated at Doc.it Awards.

Since 2002 he's been teaching filmmaking in various universities and cinema schools such as Accademia di Belle Arti di Brera, Civica Scuola di Cinema and Università Cattolica del Sacro Cuore in Milan (Italy) and SUPSI (University of Applied Sciences and Arts of Southern Switzerland) in Lugano (CH).

He founded the production company Quarto Film and, since 2007, has worked with authors such as Francesco Gatti, Dario Buccino, Filippo Ticozzi, Sara Pozzoli, Mauro Santini, Tonino De Bernardi, Giovanni Cioni and Michelangelo Frammartino.

In 2005 he dedicated a video-interview (conducted with Antonio Moresco) to the Italian experimental film-maker Alberto Grifi.

In 2012, he curated the independent section at Venice Film Festival "Cinema Corsaro", a selection of works marked by an unconventional and experimental approach to both production and direction. On this occasion, he presented his new film Carmela, saved by Buccaneers, co-directed with Mauro Santini and part of a series of experimental films loosely based on Emilio Salgari's "Jolanda, la figlia del Corsaro Nero".

Look Love Lost (2012) is a film made with private footage recorded over a few years and edited in a single session on Christmas Day 2011. Cristina Piccino on Italian newspaper Il manifesto named it the 2nd best film worldwide of 2012.

In 2015, he founded the London-based production company El Entertainment Ltd, named after Luis Buñuel's "Él".

In 2018, he started a collaboration with experimental filmmaker and artist Louis Benassi.

In September 2020 he filmed in Rome The Walk, based on Robert Walser's novella with the same name and produced by El Entertainment and Emu Films. The film stars Lino Musella as Robert/Roberto, and cinematography is by Robbie Ryan. It has been awarded the Gabbiano Prize at the Bellaria Film Festival in 2022.

== Filmography ==
- La Place (1995, Short)
- Jahilia (Occidente) (1996, Short)
- Com'è bella la città (1997, Documentary, Short)
- Dolce Stil Novo (1998, Short)
- Questo è il giardino (1999)
- L'amore imperfetto (2001)
- Bologna, 16-2-05, Giovanni Maderna and Antonio Moresco meet Alberto Grifi (2005, Documentary, Short)
- Schopenhauer (2006)
- Cielo senza terra (2010) (Co-directed with Sara Pozzoli)
- Carmela, salvata dai filibustieri (2012) (Co-directed with Mauro Santini)
- Look Love Lost (2012)
- The Walk (2021)
