= Cantique des Cantiques =

Cantique des cantiques

EP by Alain Bashung and Chloé Mons
- Released: 5 November 2002
- Genre: French rock, alternative rock
- Label: Barclay Records, Universal Music Group

Alain Bashung chronology
L'Imprudence (2002)	Cantique des cantiques (2002)	La Tournée des grands espaces (2004)

Cantique des cantiques (Song of Songs) is an EP by French rocker Alain Bashung and his wife Chloé Mons, issued in November 2002 on Barclay Records. They both sang this more-than-25-minutes long song for their wedding in 2001, on a music composed by Rodolphe Burger and with lyrics based on a new translation of the Bible's Song of Songs by the writer Olivier Cadiot.

== Reception ==
French magazine Les Inrocks praised the EP, claiming that "although the concept is worrying", the "miracle, since we're talking about religion, happens" and "the voices of Chloé Mons and Bashung answer themselves with perfection on lyrics of luminous beauty, often very clear [...], sometimes strange".

== Track listing ==
No.	Title	Writer(s)	Length
1.	"Le Cantique des cantiques"	Rodolphe Burger - Olivier Cadiot	27:00
2.	"Le Cantique des cantiques (Version instrumentale)"	Rodolphe Burger	4:28
