= Calder Publishing =

- Parent company: Alma Classics
- Founded: 1949
- Founder: John Calder
- Defunct: 2007
- Country of origin: United Kingdom
- Headquarters location: Richmond, London
- Distribution: Macmillan Distribution
- Publication types: Books
- Official website: https://almabooks.com/

Calder Publications is a publisher of books. Starting in 1949, the company published many books on all the arts, particularly subjects such as opera and painting, the theatre and critical and philosophical theory.

Calder has been noted for championing avant-garde authors and battling censorship, and has been called one of the most important independent British publishers to emerge in the post-war era. Authors published and supported by Calder have earned 18 Nobel prizes.

== History ==
John Calder started the publishing house in 1949 when manuscripts were plentiful and many books that were in demand were out of print – in the immediate post-war years paper was scarce and severely rationed.

During the 1950s, Calder published a list of translated classics, which included the works of Chekhov, Tolstoy, Dostoevsky, Goethe and Zola among others. In 1957, Calder published The Walk and Other Stories, the first translation of the Swiss author Robert Walser, translated by Christopher Middleton. The 1957 book is considered a key event in recognition of Walser as an modernist figure not only in English-language awareness but also in Swiss and German-language scholarship as Walser had been largely forgotten in the World War II era.

Calder then began to publish American titles. As a result of Senator Joe McCarthy's "witch-hunt" he was able to acquire significant American authors as well as books on issues of civil liberty that mainstream publishers in New York City were afraid to keep on their lists. This led to the development of close ties with those smaller American firms who resisted the McCarthyite pressure.

By the late 1950s, Calder published a group of new writers argued to have changed the face of twentieth-century literature. One of these was Samuel Beckett, all of whose novels, poetry, criticism, and some of his plays were published by Calder. Several writers on the Calder list became synonymous with the school of the "nouveau roman" or "new novel", including Alain Robbe-Grillet, Marguerite Duras, Claude Simon, Nathalie Sarraute and Robert Pinget. Other European novelists, playwrights and poets included Heinrich Böll, Dino Buzzati, Eugène Ionesco, Fernando Arrabal, René de Obaldia, Peter Weiss and Ivo Andrić. Calder was soon launching new experimental British writers such as Ann Quin, Alan Burns, Eva Tucker and R. C. Kennedy – who, influenced by their European counterparts, became part of the avant-garde of the early 1960s.

== Controversy ==
Following their visit to Scotland, Calder began to publish the previously banned work of writers Henry Miller and William S. Burroughs. Controversy also surrounded the publication of Alexander Trocchi's Cain's Book, which was a success despite a minor obscenity trial in Sheffield. Hubert Selby's Last Exit to Brooklyn, although well reviewed, had a more serious case brought against it, first in a private prosecution by Tory MP Cyril Black, and then at the Old Bailey. John Mortimer led a successful appeal and the company was vindicated after losing in both lower courts.

== Ownership ==
In 1963 the company changed its name to Calder and Boyars to accommodate a new partner (Marion Boyars, who subsequently founded Marion Boyars Publishers), but the company went back to its original name when the partnership was dissolved in 1975.

In 2007, Calder Publications was acquired by Oneworld Classics, a joint venture between Alma Books and Oneworld Publications. In 2012, Alma Books acquired full ownership of Calder and Oneworld Classics, renaming the latter Alma Classics.

== Book series ==
Some of the following series were published by one of the following imprints, John Calder, Calder & Boyars, and Calder Publications, and others by more than one.

- Calderbooks (variant series title: Calder Modern Classics)
- English National Opera Guides (in association with English National Opera and the Royal Opera) (joint publisher: Riverrun Press, New York)
- European Classics (also known as: Translations of European Classics)
- French Surrealism
- German Expressionism
- German Writing in Translation
- Illustrated Calderbooks
- Jupiter Books
- New Writers
- New Writing & New Writers
- Open Forum
- Opera Library: The History of Opera Series
- Platform Books
- Profile Books (also known as Everygreen Profile Books) (joint publisher: Grove Press, New York)
- Signature

== Annuals and Biannuals ==
- Opera Annual
- International Films Annual
- International Theatre Annual
- International Literary Annual
- The Opera Directory

== Magazines ==
- Gambit
