= La Tournée des grands espaces =

Live album by Alain Bashung
- Released: 2004
- Recorded: Essentially at the Coopérative de Mai in Tourzel-Ronzières; At the Studio Plus XXX, Paris (mixing); At the Studio Metropolis, London (mastering)
- Genre: French rock, alternative rock
- Label: Barclay Records, Universal Music Group
- Producer: Anne Lamy

Alain Bashung chronology
Cantique des cantiques (2002)	La Tournée des grands espaces (2004)	La Ballade de Calamity Jane (2006)

La Tournée des grands espaces (The wide spaces tour) is the fourth live album by Alain Bashung, issued in 2004 on Barclay Records. It documents the 2003-2004 tour which followed the album L'Imprudence.

== Production ==
The scene of the Tournée des Grands Espaces tour was a metallic slope inclined towards the audience, Alain Bashung singing in the center, with the musicians surrounding him.

The tour was produced by Garance productions (Laurent Castanié), and directed by Vincent Boussard and Alain Poisson. The general direction was done by Jean-François Meinadier and the technical direction by François Lepaysan. Some European rock critics consider this to be one of the best live albums in the history of French music.

== Reception ==
In 2012 the French edition of Rolling Stone magazine named this album the 58th greatest live album ever (out of 100).

== Track listing ==
CD 1
No.	Title	Writer(s)	Length
1.	"Tel"	Alain Bashung / Jean Fauque - Alain Bashung / Mobile in Motion	5:03
2.	"Je me dore"	Alain Bashung / Jean Fauque - Alain Bashung / Ludovic Bource	4:22
3.	"Faites monter"	Alain Bashung / Jean Fauque - Alain Bashung / Ludovic Bource	4:28
4.	"La nuit je mens"	Alain Bashung / Jean Fauque - Alain Bashung / Les Valentins	4:43
5.	"Sommes-nous"	Alain Bashung / Jean Fauque - Alain Bashung	3:40
6.	"Aucun express"	Alain Bashung / Jean Fauque - Alain Bashung	4:42
7.	"Le Dimanche à Tchernobyl"	Alain Bashung / Jean Fauque - Alain Bashung / Ludovic Bource / Mobile in Motion	4:11
8.	"L'Irréel"	Alain Bashung / Jean Fauque - Alain Bashung / Mobile in Motion / Ludovic Bource / Jean Lamoot	3:12
9.	"Mes prisons"	Alain Bashung / Jean Fauque - Alain Bashung	3:44
10.	"Fantaisie militaire"	Alain Bashung / Jean Fauque - Alain Bashung	4:52
11.	"Volontaire"	Serge Gainsbourg / Alain Bashung - Alain Bashung	3:00
12.	"Étrange été"	Jean Fauque - Alain Bashung	3:30
13.	"Légère éclaircie"	Boris Bergman - Alain Bashung	3:39
14.	"Bombez !"	Jean Fauque - Alain Bashung	3:08
15.	"What's in a Bird"	Alain Bashung / Pascal Jacquemin - Alain Bashung	3:58
16.	"Mes bras"	Alain Bashung / Jean Fauque - Alain Bashung / Mobile in Motion	6:37

CD 2
No.	Title	Writer(s)	Length
1.	"Elvire"	Alain Bashung / Jean Fauque - Alain Bashung	4:51
2.	"J'passe pour une caravane"	Alain Bashung / Jean Fauque - Alain Bashung	3:49
3.	"Osez Joséphine"	Alain Bashung / Jean Fauque - Alain Bashung	3:09
4.	"Les Grands Voyageurs"	Jean Fauque / Laurent Petitgand - Alain Bashung	3:52
5.	"Samuel Hall"	Olivier Cadiot - Rodolphe Burger	5:50
6.	"Vertige de l'amour"	Boris Bergman - Alain Bashung	3:21
7.	"2043"	Alain Bashung / Jean Fauque - Alain Bashung	3:44
8.	"Faisons envie (duet with Chloé Mons)"	Christophe Miossec / Alain Bashung - Alain Bashung / Mobile in Motion	3:42
9.	"Cantique des cantiques (duet with Chloé Mons)"	Olivier Cadiot - Rodolphe Burger	7:35
10.	"Madame rêve"	Pierre Grillet - Alain Bashung	5:11
11.	"Ma petite entreprise"	Alain Bashung / Jean Fauque - Alain Bashung	4:09
12.	"Martine boude"	Alain Bashung / Serge Gainsbourg - Alain Bashung	5:22
13.	"Bijou, bijou"	Boris Bergman / Daniel Tardieu - Alain Bashung	6:29
14.	"Angora"	Alain Bashung / Jean Fauque - Alain Bashung	2:26
15.	"Malaxe"	Alain Bashung / Jean Fauque - Alain Bashung / Les Valentins	6:51

== Personnel ==
=== Musicians ===
- Alain Bashung - vocal, guitar, harmonica.
- Geoffrey Burton - guitar.
- Adriano Cominotto - keyboards.
- Brad Scott - bass guitar, double bass.
- Arno Dieterlin - drums.
- Yann Péchin - mandoline, guitar.
- Nicolas Stevens - violin.
- Jean-François Assy - cello.
- Chloé Mons - vocals.

=== Production ===
- Bob Coke: recording, mixing.
- Pierrick Devin: mixing.
- Ian Cooper: mastering.
- Anne Lamy: executive production.
- Lawrens Brunel, Juliette Roizard: production and promotion assistants.
- Mathieu Zazzo, Dominique Gonzalez-Forestier, Don Kent: booklet photos.
