= Sand Screens =

- French: Écrans de sable
- Directed by: Randa Chahal Sabag
- Written by: Randa Chahal Sabag
- Starring: Maria Schneider; Laure Killing; Michel Albertini
- Music by: Michel Portal
- Production company: Carthago Films
- Distributed by: AMLF
- Release date: 1991
- Running time: 90 mins
- Countries: France; Italy; Tunisia
- Language: French

Sand Screens (French: Écrans de sable) is a 1991 film that is Lebanese director Randa Chahal Sabag's first feature film.
