= Michel Creton =

French actor

Michel Creton (17 August 1942 in Wassy, Haute-Marne, France) is a French actor.

He came to international attention with the release of Un homme de trop (Shock Troops) by Costa Gavras in 1967. Since then, he played in many films, appeared on TV and on stage (for example in 1989 in Un fil à la patte de Georges Feydeau in Théâtre du Palais-Royal in Paris). While he was in cinema a supporting actor, as one of Bernard Fresson's friends in Max and the junkmen, and mostly rare in major roles like his thief in Nicholas Gessner's Le tuer triste, he was a leading man on TV: alongside to Claude Jade in Fou comme François. For his second TV movie with Claude Jade, Treize, he was the writer of the screenplay.

== Selected filmography ==
- 1967: Love in the Night by Marcel Camus, with Serge Gainsbourg
- 1968: Un homme de trop (Shock Troops) by Costa-Gavras, with Jacques Perrin
- 1968: Le Bourgeois Gentilhomme by Bernarde Borderie, with Michel Serrault (Covielle)
- 1969: La Voie lactée (The Milky Way) by Luis Buñuel
- 1970: Béru und jene Damen by Guy Lefranc, with Gérard Barray
- 1971: Max et les ferrailleurs (Max and the junkmen) by Claude Sautet
- 1971: Un meurtre est un meurtre (A Murder Is a Murder... Is a Murder by Étienne Périer, with Stéphane Audran
- 1971: La Dame de Monsoreau by Yannick Andrei, (Chicot)
- 1973: Au rendez-vous de la mort joyeuse (At the Meeting with Joyous Death), by Juan Luis Buñuel
- 1973: Le Dingue by Daniel Daert, with Christian Baltauss
- 1974: Impossible Is Not French with Robert Lamoureux
- 1975: Au-delà de la peur (Beyond Fear) by Yannick Andréi, with Michel Bouquet
- 1976: La Fleur des pois by Raymond Rouleau, with Nicole Jamet
- 1976: Les beaux messieurs de Bois-Doré (The Gallant Lords of Bois-Doré) by Bernard Borderie
- 1977: Armaguedon by Alain Jessua, with Alain Delon, Jean Yanne
- 1977: Monsieur Papa by Philippe Monnier, with Claude Brasseur and Nathalie Baye
- 1978: Les Bronzés (French Fried Vacation) by Patrice Leconte, with Josiane Balasko
- 1978: Fou comme François by Gérard Chouchan, with Claude Jade
- 1981: Treize (13) by Patrick Villechaize, with Claude Jade
- 1981: Psy by Philippe de Broca, with Dewaere, Anny Duperey
- 1982: Le Crime de Pierre Lacaze (The Crime of Pierre Lacaze) by Jean Delannoy
- 1983: Le Grand carnaval by Alexandre Arcady, with Philippe Noiret
- 1983: Julien Fontanes, magistrat by Serge Friedman
- 1984: Les Morfalous by Henri Verneuil, with Jean-Paul Belmondo
- 1985: Le Tueur triste by Nicolas Gessner, with Edwige Feuillère
- 1986: Tenue de soirée by Bertrand Blier, with Gérard Depardieu
- 1987: Le Solitaire (The Loner) by Jacques Deray, with Jean-Paul Belmondo
- 1988: À gauche en sortant de l'ascenseur, by Édouard Molinaro, with Pierre Richard, Emmanuelle Béart and Richard Bohringer
- 1990: Il y a des jours... et des lunes by Claude Lelouch
- 1997: Soleil by Roger Hanin, with Sophia Loren, Philippe Noiret
- 2005: Mis en bouteille a château by Marion Sarraut (TV)
