= Empty Days =

- Directed by: Marion Vernoux
- Written by: Santiago Amigorena; Gaëlle Macé; Marc Syrigas; Marion Vernoux
- Produced by: Pascal Verroust
- Starring: Valeria Bruni Tedeschi
- Cinematography: Dominique Colin
- Edited by: Jennifer Augé
- Music by: Alexandre Desplat
- Distributed by: Pyramide Distribution
- Release date: 1999
- Language: French

Empty Days (French: Rien à faire) is a 1999 French drama film written and directed by Marion Vernoux and starring Valeria Bruni Tedeschi.

The film was entered into the main competition at the 56th Venice International Film Festival, winning the President of the Italian Senate's gold medal.

== Cast ==
- Valeria Bruni Tedeschi as Marie Del Sol
- Patrick Dell'Isola as Pierre Perset
- Sergi López as Luis
- Florence Thomassin as Sophie
- Chloé Mons as Catherine
- Alexandre Carrière as Hervé
- Rachid Bouali as le serveur du café
- Annette Lowcay as la caissière du supermarché
- Marco Cherqui as Antoine
- Antoine Mathieu as Martineau
- Éric Caravaca as le jeune homme du bus
- Dodine Herry as la directrice des Ressources Humaines
