= Shi Xiangsheng =

Chinese writer

Shi Xiangsheng (Chinese: 施祥生; pinyin: Shī Xiángshēng; born 1942) is a Chinese writer. He is best known for his 1997 story "A Sun in the Sky" (Chinese: 天上有个太阳; pinyin: Tiān shàng yǒu ge tàiyáng), which was adapted into Zhang Yimou's 1999 film Not One Less.

During the Cultural Revolution, Shi was sent to Xinjiang province in western China to work as a peasant, after which he became a teacher and a writer. His other works include The Divorce (Chinese: 离婚; pinyin: Líhūn) and The Birthday Present (Chinese: 生日礼物; pinyin: Shēngrì lǐwù).
