= Christopher Middleton =

Christopher Middleton may refer to:

- Christopher Middleton (d. 1628) (1560–1628), English translator and poet
- Christopher Middleton (poet) (1926–2015), British poet
- Christopher Middleton (navigator) (c. 1690 – 1770), Royal Navy officer and navigator

== See also ==
- Khris Middleton (born 1991), American professional basketball player
