= The Veiled Man =

- Directed by: Maroun Bagdadi
- Written by: Maroun Bagdadi
- Produced by: Humbert Balsan; René Cleitman
- Starring: Bernard Giraudeau; Michel Piccoli
- Cinematography: Patrick Blossier
- Edited by: Luc Barnier
- Music by: Gabriel Yared
- Distributed by: UGC Distribution
- Release date: 1987
- Running time: 93 minutes
- Country: France
- Language: French

The Veiled Man (French: L'homme voilé) is a 1987 Lebanese-French drama film written and directed by Maroun Bagdadi.

The film was entered into the main competition at the 44th edition of the Venice Film Festival, where Bernard Giraudeau received the Golden Ciak for best actor.

== Plot ==
Returning home after spending four years in Lebanon, a doctor agrees to kill those responsible for a massacre, one of whom is the lover of his 16-years-old daughter.

== Cast ==
- Bernard Giraudeau as Pierre
- Michel Piccoli as Kassar
- Laure Marsac as Claire
- Michel Albertini as Kamal
- Sandrine Dumas as Julie
- Fouad Naim as Kamal's uncle
- Sonia Ichti as Kamal's lover
- Jonathan Layana as Marouane
- Kamal Kassar as Youssef
