= Christopher Middleton (poet) =

British poet and translator (1926–2015)

John Christopher Middleton (10 June 1926 – 29 November 2015) was a British poet and a noted literary translator, especially of German literature.

== Life and education ==
Middleton was born in Truro, Cornwall, English in 1926. Following four years' service in the Royal Air Force, he studied at Merton College, Oxford, matriculating in 1948.

Middleton married Mary Freer in 1953; they had two daughters and a son. They divorced in 1969. Middleton died on 29 November 2015 in Austin, Texas.

== Literary and academic career ==
=== Academic Positions ===
Middleton held academic positions at the University of Zürich and King's College London. In 1966 he took up a position as Professor of Germanic Languages & Literature at the University of Texas, Austin, retiring in 1998.

=== Translation work ===
Middleton published translations of Robert Walser, Nietzsche, Hölderlin, Goethe, Gert Hofmann and many others. He is also noted for translations from Swedish (Lars Gustafsson) and of Arab Andalusian Spanish works.

==== Robert Walser rediscovery and translations ====
Middleton was a highly regarded translator of the Swiss German-language author Robert Walser (1878–1956) who is considered one of the greatest stylists in the German language but had never been translated into any language until Middleton created the first translations in the 1950s. Walser was largely unknown in the English-speaking world before this point, but Middleton discovered his work while in Zurich. These first translations included Walser's 1917 novella The Walk while Walser was still alive and later Walser's novel Jakob von Gunten.

Middleton has been described by German-language literary scholars as not only the first translator of Robert Walser, but the key person (including Germans) to label and recognize Walser as a literary figure of modernism in the time period after Walser had been forgotten around or during World War II. Weber-Henking similarly argued that Middleton's publication of The Walk and Other Stories at Calder Publishing brought Walser into "the vicinity of the nouveau roman ["new novel" era], Samuel Beckett, and the English avant-garde." Leucht states that the rediscovery of Walser, even within Swiss German literary discussion, "was made possible thanks to Christopher Middleton's 1957 translation."

Noted scholar and translator Mark Harman wrote in 2008 that Middleton's "aptly elegant" work and "gifts as a poet" re-created Walser's dauntingly-challenging "wildly associative style [and] seemingly effortless charm, grace, and wit." Harman also credits Middleton's translation collection Selected Stories (1982) with bringing a new phase of attention to Walser in America. Harman wrote in 1983 that "Middleton's masterful command of language captured the stylistic nuances of the originals, often by taking calculated risks with usage." Translator Tom Whalen in a review of Speaking to the Rose (2005) wrote that readers are fortunate to have Christopher Middleton's "quirky brilliance" as a poet and translator, and that his work is a "miracle and a marvel" because of Walser's unusual syntax, neologisms, and word usage. Susan Bernofsky wrote, "Middleton "proved that the intricacies of Walser's prose can be mimed into English with elegance and grace." Scholar Samuel Frederick wrote that Middleton had "a lasting influence in communicating Walser's work to the English-speaking world."

Carl Seelig, Walser's legal guardian, stated that Walser responded to the news of Middleton's first translations, around 1955, with a Swiss German equivalent of "My, my" (meaning, "Well, look at that"). Middleton said that Seelig rewarded him with encouragement words and cognac.

== Awards ==
He received various awards, including the Geoffrey Faber Memorial Prize and the Schlegel-Tieck Prize for translation.

== Works ==
- The Pigeons and the Girls (unknown)
- Poems (1944)
- Nocturne in Eden (1945)
- The Vision of a Drowned Man (1949)
- Torse 3 (1962)
- Nonsequences (1965)
- Our Flowers & Nice Bones (1969)
- The Fossil Fish (1970)
- Briefcase History (1972)
- The Lonely Suppers of W. V. Balloon (1975)
- Pataxanadu and Other Prose (1977)
- Céleste, Orange Export Ltd., collection Chutes (1977)
- Bolshevism in Art and Other Expository Writings (1978) essays
- Anasphere: le torse antique (Burning Deck, 1978)
- Carminalenia (1980)
- The Pursuit of the Kingfisher (Carcanet Press, 1983) essays
- 111 Poems (Carcanet Press, 1983)
- Serpentine (1984)
- Two Horse Wagon going by (Carcanet Press, 1986)
- Selected Writings (Carcanet Press, 1989)
- The Balcony Tree (Carcanet Press, 1992)
- On a Photograph of Chekhov (1995)
- Intimate Chronicles (Carcanet Press, 1996)
- The Swallow Diver (1997)
- Jackdaw Jiving (Carcanet Press, 1998)
- The Redbird Hexagon (1999)
- Faint Harps and Silver Voices: Selected Translations (Carcanet Press, 2000)
- Twenty Tropes for Doctor Dark (2000)
- The Word Pavilion and Selected Poems (Carcanet Press, 2001)
- The Anti-Basilisk (Carcanet Press, 2005)
- Collected Poems (Carcanet Press, 2008)
- Collected Later Poems (Carcanet Press, 2014)

== Translations ==
- The Walk and Other Stories by Robert Walser (Calder Publishing, 1957)
- Jakob von Gunten by Robert Walser (University of Texas Press, 1969)
- Kafka's Other Trial, by Elias Canetti (Schocken Books, 1974)
- Selected Stories, by Robert Walser (Carcanet Press, 1988)
- The Spectacle at the Tower, by Gert Hofmann (Carcanet Press, 1988)
- Our Conquest, by Gert Hofmann (Carcanet Press, 1988)
- The Parable of the Blind, by Gert Hofmann (Fromm International, 1989)
- Speaking to the Rose (University of Nebraska Press, 2005). A collection of short works by the Swiss author Robert Walser.
- Middleton's translations of Robert Walser's "Flower Days" and "Frau Wilke" are re-published in the 2012 collection Berlin Stories.
