= Chloe Goodchild =

- Occupation(s): Singer, author, educator
- Instrument: Singing
- Years active: 1976–present
- Website: thenakedvoice.com

Chloe Goodchild is a musician, performer, and recording artist.

== Education ==
Chloë Goodchild studied music, English and education at the University of Cambridge and the University of East Anglia from 1972 to 1976 and qualified as a music and English teacher.

== Career ==
In the 1970s, Goodchild travelled in Africa, India, Turkey, Europe, the US and Canada. She was influenced by Anandamayi Ma. As a result, Goodchild developed a method of sound and voice, which in 1990 she named the Naked Voice. This combines Indian philosophy and classical music teachings with Japanese martial art movements.

Goodchild has worked with politicians, high-security prisoners, Jerry Hall, Oprah Winfrey, Glenn Close, and Angelo Badalamenti. She has performed in several cities internationally, including New York in 2001, Edinburgh, and Dublin in 2012. As a composer, her music is on the soundtrack of Jane Campion's Holy Smoke! and in a celebrity performance of The Vagina Monologues in Madison Square Garden.

Goodchild's solo and compilation albums include Devi, Fierce Wisdom, A Thousand Ways of Light and the Grammy Award–nominated Sura. Goodchild and the Rumi poet, Coleman Barks, recorded two Rumi albums: There is Some Kiss We Want and The Glance. Goodchild has collaborated and recorded with composer John Tavener.

== Books ==
- The Naked Voice – Transform Your Life Through The Power of Sound (2015, North Atlantic Books)
