= Marion Vernoux =

French film director and screenwriter

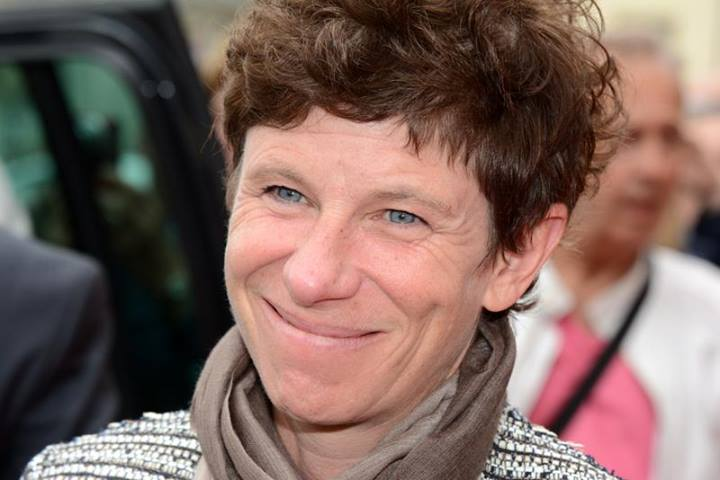
- Born: 29 June 1966 (age 60); Montreuil, Seine-Saint-Denis, France
- Occupations: Director, screenwriter
- Years active: 1990-present
- Children: 3

Marion Vernoux (French pronunciation: [maʁjɔ̃ vɛʁnu]; born 29 June 1966) is a French director and screenwriter.

== Life and career ==
Born in Montreuil, Seine-Saint-Denis, Vernoux was the only daughter of a casting director and of a set decorator. After several experiences as a production assistant, she debuted in 1988 as co-director of the music video for the song "N'importe quoi" by Florent Pagny, and in 1990 she wrote the film Pacific Palisades, inspired by her own experiences. In 1991 she made her feature film debut with Pierre qui roule, which was well received by critics. Her 1999 film Empty Days was entered into the main competition at the 56th edition of the Venice Film Festival, winning the President of the Italian Senate's gold medal.

== Personal life ==
Vernoux was married to director Jacques Audiard, with whom she had three children.

== Filmography ==
Year	Title	Role	Notes
1990	Pacific Palisades	Writer	
1991	Pierre qui roule	Director & writer	TV movie
1994	Personne ne m'aime	Director & writer	Nominated - César Award for Best First Feature Film; Nominated - Locarno Festival - Golden Leopard
1996	Love, etc.	Director & writer	
1996	Je n'en ferai pas un drame	Actress	
1996	L'@mour est à réinventer	Director	TV series (1 episode)
1998	La voie est libre	Writer	
1999	Empty Days	Director & writer	Venice Film Festival - The President of the Italian Senate's Gold Medal; Nominated - Venice Film Festival - Golden Lion
1999	Venus Beauty Institute	Writer	
2000	Drug Scenes	Director	TV series (1 episode)
2001	A Hell of a Day	Director & writer	
2003	Jusqu'au bout de la route	Writer	TV movie
2004	À boire	Director & writer	
2008	Rien dans les poches	Director & writer	TV movie
2013	Bright Days Ahead	Director & writer	
2015	Et ta soeur	Director & writer	
2016	Raw	Actress	
2018	Bonhomme	Director & Writer	
