= Randa Chahal Sabag =

Lebanese film director (1953–2008)

Randa Chahal Sabag or Sabbagh (Arabic: رندا شهال صباغ, romanized: Randā Shahāl Ṣabbāgh; December 11, 1953, in Tripoli – August 25, 2008 in Paris) was a Lebanese-Iraqi film director, producer and screenwriter.

== Biography ==
Born in 1953 in Tripoli, Lebanon, to an Iraqi father and a Lebanese mother, she studied film in Paris at the École Louis-Lumière during the 1970s. She died of cancer in Paris at the age of 54.

== Career ==
Chahal began her career with documentary films but shifted to feature films by the 1990s, though she retained 'a documentary-maker's nose for contentious subject matter'. She is reported to have said, "You discover in my films a common denominator. You notice that the camera only moves from right to left exactly like Arabic writing."

Chahal served as a jury member at the Venice 64th International Film Festival in the Opera Prima section.

Les Infidèles, a 1997 drama, is about the relationship between a French diplomat and a former Islamist who agrees to turn over the names of his colleagues if the French government will release an imprisoned friend.

Civilisées (A Civilized People) released in 1999, is a black comedy about the Lebanese Civil War, which killed at least 100,000 people. Sabbagh deployed a 'vaudevillian cast' including foreign servants and philanthropists, visiting expatriates, militiamen and criminals – in a profane and dis-unified story mixing elements of absurdist plays. Some 40 minutes of the film was censored for its 'obscenity' and 'uncomplimentary representation of Lebanon during this particularly unsavory spell of its history'. It was subsequently screened only once, at the Beirut International Film Festival.

Chahal became noted in 2003 with The Kite, which received the Silver Lion at the 2003 Venice Film Festival and won several prestigious prizes and international acclaim; the Grand Special Jury Prize, the Cinema for Peace Award and the Laterna Magica Prize. Set in a low-key South Lebanese village, the film is about love, life, death and the absurdity of the Israeli occupation, seen from the perspective of a Druze family separated following the division of their village into two with one half annexed to Israel. The story evolves around an arranged marriage between Lamia, a 16-year-old Lebanese Druze girl, (played by Flavia Bechara) and her Israeli Druze cousin (played by Maher Bsaibes). The drama unfolds under the vigilant yet impotent Israeli-Lebanese border guards; one of whom is played by renowned Lebanese composer, actor and playwright Ziad Rahbani. The Kite is used 'as a metaphor for love and for life at the border', it explores, with depth and sometimes humor, 'the meaning of brides, of the hope they represent for divided families and, sometimes, for divided nations'.

== Filmography ==
| Year | Title | Notes |
|---|---|---|
| 2007 | Too Bad for Them | Forthcoming |
| 2002 | Le Cerf-Volant (The Kite) | Feature, 78 minutes; Global Lens (Global Film Initiative), New York City, 2008; Prix de la bande Sonore, Bastia, 2004; Prix de TV5, Belgium, 2004; Silver Lion, Grand Prize of the Jury, Venice Film Festival, 2003; Prix de la Lanterne Magique, Venice Film Festival, 2003; Prix de la paix- Gillo Pontecorvo, Venice Film Festival, 2003; Prix international de la musique et du film, Auxerre, 2003 |
| 2000 | Souha, survivre à l'enfer | Documentary, 56 minutes; Selection Fipa, 2001 |
| 1999 | Civilisées (A Civilized People) | Feature, 97 minutes; Nestor Almendros Prize, New York City, 2000; Official selection, Venice Film Festival, 1999 |
| 1997 | Les Infidèles (The Infidels) | Drama, 85 minutes; Official selection, Locarno, 1997 |
| 1995 | Nos Guerres Imprudentes | Documentary, 52 minutes; Biennale Prize, Institut du Monde Arabe, Paris, 1996; Official selection, Locarno, 1995; Rencontres Internationales, Paris, 1995 |
| 1991 | Ecrans de Sable (Screens of Sand) | Feature, 90 minutes; Official selection, Venice Film Festival, 1991; Director's Prize, Valencia; Music Prize, la Baule |
| 1984 | Cheikh Imam | Documentary, 52 minutes |
| 1980 | Liban d'Autrefois (Lebanon Long Ago) | Fiction, 12 minutes; Jury Prize, Carthage Film Festival |
| 1978 | Pas à Pas (Step by Step) | Documentary, 80 minutes; Prize, Festival des Pays francophones de Namu |

== Awards ==
- National Order of the Cedar (Officer), national decoration, Lebanon, 2003
- Nestor Almendros Prize, New York City, 2000
