= Korea National Opera =

"Seoul Opera House"

The Korea National Opera (founded 2000) is an independent foundation of its main performing venue, the new Seoul Arts Center. The central external bow of the new arts centre has the sign Seoul Opera House above the windows. The company was formed from what had previously from 1962 been a department under the National Theater of Korea in Seoul.
