= Jalila Baccar =

Tunisian playwright and actor (born 1952)

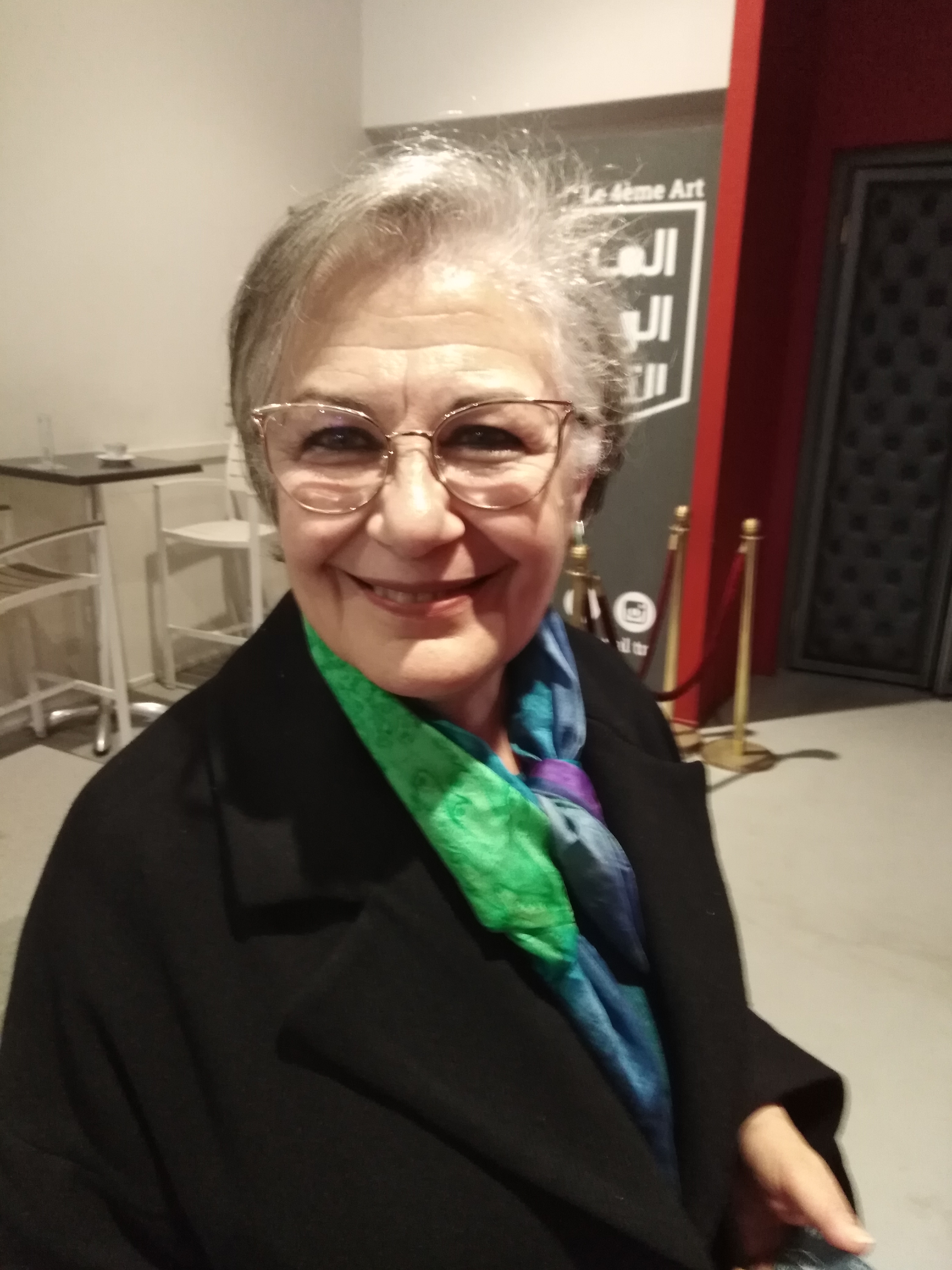
- Baccar in 2019
- Born: 23 November 1952 (age 72); Tunis
- Citizenship: French protectorate of Tunisia, Tunisia
- Occupation(s): Actor, Playwright

Jalila Baccar (Arabic: جليلة بكار, romanized: Jalīlah Bakkār; born 1952) is a Tunisian playwright and actor.

== Early life and education ==
Baccar was born in Tunis on 23 November 1952. She became interested in drama while at school.

== Career ==
When she graduated from school she joined a regional theatre company in Gafsa, an oasis and mining community in the south-west of Tunisia. She and the company's co-director Fadhel Jaïbi tried to modernise the company but met with resistance both from their fellow actors and from the authorities. They moved back to Tunis in 1976 and established their own company, Almasrah al-jadid: The New Theatre, the first independent professional theatre company in Tunisia.

In 1993 Baccar and Jaïbi established a new company, Familia. Their play Junun (Dementia) was staged at Avignon in the 2002 Festival.

In 2003, she won the SACD Prize for Francophonie for Araberlin.

Their play Amnesia "which details all the ills of Tunisia under the now defunct regime, with its nepotism and corruption, economic hardships and police surveillance" was staged in Tunis in 2011, and then at the National Theatre in Bordeaux, France.

In 2014, Baccar and Jaïbi sponsored the 76th class of the École Nationale Supérieure des Arts et Techniques du Théâtre de Lyon.

Marvin Carlson describes Baccar as "generally recognized as one of the leading women playwrights and performers in Tunisia and the Arab world".

== Personal life ==
Baccar is married to Fadhel Jaïbi.
