= Dario Buccino =

Italian composer

Dario Buccino (20 November 1968) is an Italian composer, singer-songwriter, music theorist, and artist. He created the HN System and founded the ensemble Laboratorio Aperto Fatti Sonori.

== Biography ==
In 1991, Buccino elaborated an original music system called "HN System". The system integrates composition, notation and performance techniques based on the parametrization of physical actions. In 1993 the composer founded the "Laboratorio Aperto Fatti Sonori", an ensemble devoted to the execution of his scores. In 1997 he extended his application of the HN System to include sheets of steel. His musical activity ranges over a wide variety of fields: beside his research as experimental composer and performer, Buccino also works for the cinema and the theatre as a composer, interpreter, musical consultant, as a rock, pop and jazz composer, arranger and guitarist, and as a singer-songwriter, busker and music journalist.

== Bibliography ==
- Bob Baker Fish, Dario Buccino – Corpo Nostro (Extreme), in "Cyclic Defrost", 2009.
- Pietro Misuraca, Il Suono dei Soli e le lamiere di Dario Buccino, in CURVA MINORE. Contemporary sounds, musica nuova in Sicilia 1997–2007, a c. di Gaetano Pennino, Regione Siciliana, Casa museo Antonino Uccello n. 4/5, Palermo 2009, pp. 98–111. ISBN 978-88-6164-107-5.
- Stefano Lombardi Vallauri, Azione fisica ed empatia nell'opera musicale-performativa di Dario Buccino, in «Prospettive su teatro e neuroscienze. Dialoghi e sperimentazioni», a.c. di Clelia Falletti e Gabriele Sofia, Bulzoni, Roma, 2012. ISBN 978-88-7870-632-3.
- Delia Dattilo, Dario Buccino: Steel Sheet Happiness, in "Satura"', n. 14, Satura, Genova, 2011.
- Andrea Ferraris, Intervista a Dario Buccino, in "sand-zine".
- Russell Cuzner, Dario Buccino – Corpo Nostro (Extreme 2009), in "musiquemachine".
