= Michel Albertini =

French actor, scenographer and theatre director (1953–2026)

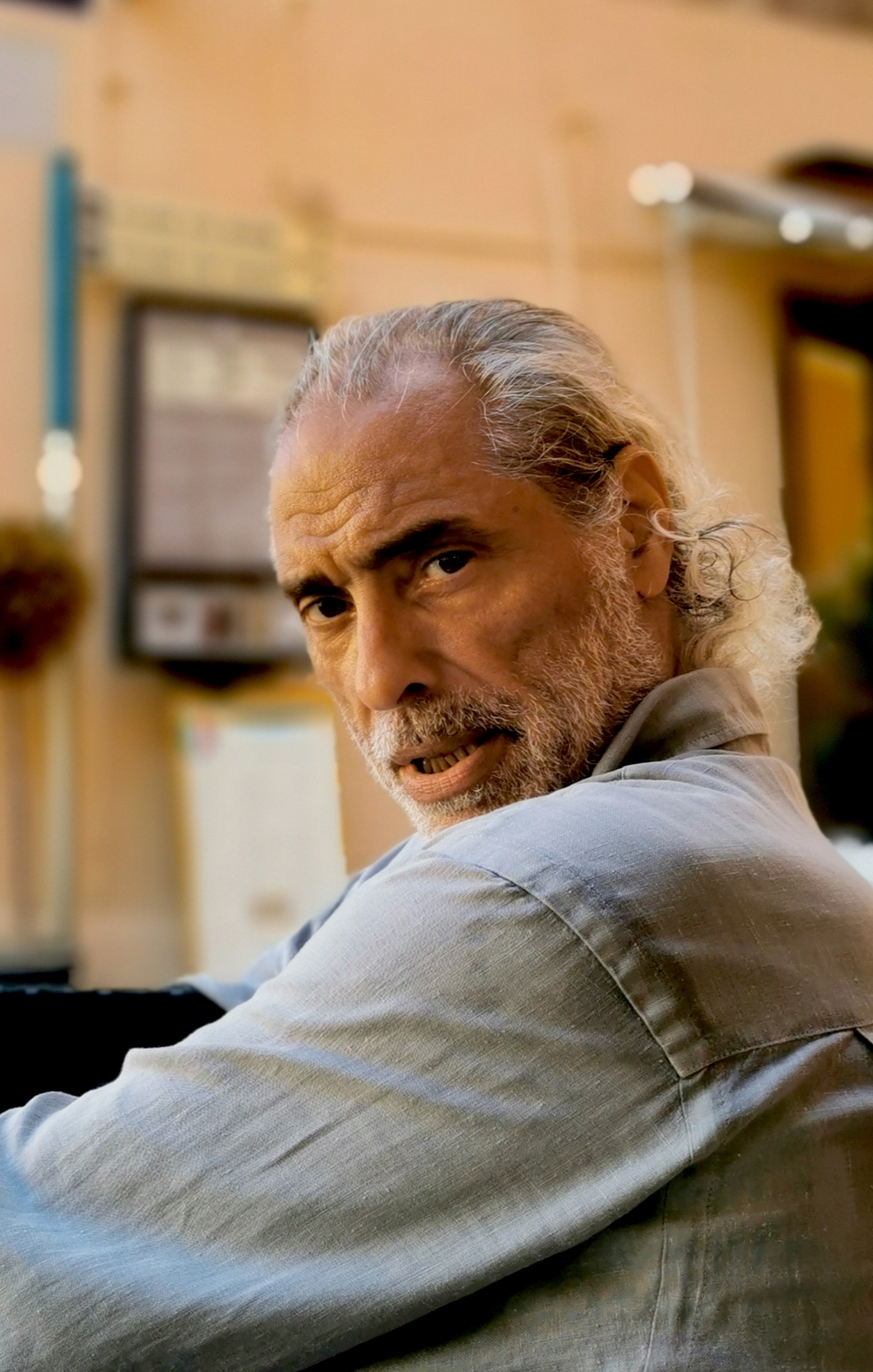
- Born: Michel Yves Albertini; 15 May 1953; Marseille, Bouches-du-Rhône, France
- Died: 25 August 2026 (aged 73)
- Education: Conservatoire de Paris
- Occupations: Actor, scenographer, theatre director and author

Michel Yves Albertini (15 May 1953 – 25 August 2026) was a French actor, scenographer, theatre director and author. He studied theatre at the Conservatoire National de Paris and spent some period in New York as a «Villa Médicis» scholar.

Albertini died on 25 August 2026, at the age of 73.

== Filmography ==
=== Film ===
- La Main à couper (1974) as Daniel Noblet
- Verdict (1974) as André Leoni
- I as in Icarus (1979) as Luigi Lacosta
- The Public Woman (1984) as Maurice
- L'Amour braque (1985) as André
- All Mixed Up (1985) as Étienne
- The Veiled Man (1987) as Kamal
- Sand Screens (1991) as Talal
- Treasure of the Bitch Islands (1991) as Bormane
- Nelly and Mr. Arnaud (1995) as Taieb
- Tempo (2003) as Gerard
- Guy (2018) as The commissioner
