= Not One Less =

1999 film by Zhang Yimou

- US theatrical release poster
- Traditional Chinese: 一個都不能少
- Simplified Chinese: 一个都不能少
- Hanyu Pinyin: Yīgè dōu bùnéng shǎo
- Directed by: Zhang Yimou
- Written by: Shi Xiangsheng
- Produced by: Zhang Yimou
- Starring: Wei Minzhi; Zhang Huike
- Cinematography: Hou Yong
- Edited by: Zhai Ru
- Music by: San Bao
- Production companies: Columbia Pictures Film Production Asia; Guangxi Film; Beijing New Picture
- Distributed by: Columbia TriStar Film Distributors International
- Release dates: 7 September 1999 (Venice); 14 January 2000 (Mexico); 18 February 2000 (United States)
- Running time: 106 minutes
- Country: China
- Language: Mandarin

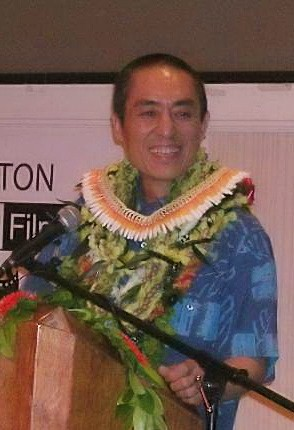
Director Zhang Yimou

Not One Less is a 1999 drama film by Chinese director Zhang Yimou, adapted from Shi Xiangsheng's 1997 story A Sun in the Sky (Chinese: 天上有个太阳; pinyin: tiān shàng yǒu ge tàiyáng). It was produced by Guangxi Film Studio and released by China Film Group Corporation in mainland China, and distributed by Sony Pictures Classics in North America and Columbia TriStar Film Distributors internationally.

Set in the People's Republic of China during the 1990s, the film centers on a 13-year-old substitute teacher, Wei Minzhi, in the Chinese countryside. Called in to substitute for a village teacher for one month, Wei is told not to lose any students. When one of the boys takes off in search of work in the big city, she goes looking for him. The film addresses education reform in China, the economic gap between urban and rural populations, and the prevalence of bureaucracy and authority figures in everyday life. It is filmed in a neorealist/documentary style with a troupe of non-professional actors who play characters with the same names and occupations as the actors have in real life, blurring the boundaries between drama and reality.

The domestic release of Not One Less was accompanied by a Chinese government campaign aimed at promoting the film and cracking down on piracy. Internationally, the film was generally well-received, but it also attracted criticism for its ostensibly political message; foreign critics are divided on whether the film should be read as praising or criticizing the Chinese government. When the film was excluded from the 1999 Cannes Film Festival's competition section, Zhang withdrew it and another film from the festival, and published a letter rebuking Cannes for politicization of and "discrimination" against Chinese cinema. The film went on to win the Venice Film Festival's Golden Lion and several other awards, and Zhang won the award for best director at the Golden Rooster Awards.

== Background ==
In the 1990s, primary education reform had become one of the top priorities in the People's Republic of China. About 160 million Chinese people had missed all or part of their education because of the Cultural Revolution in the late 1960s and early 1970s, and in 1986 the National People's Congress enacted a law calling for nine years of compulsory education. By 1993, it was clear that much of the country was making little progress on implementing nine-year compulsory education, so the 1993–2000 seven-year plan focused on this goal. One of the major challenges educators faced was the large number of rural schoolchildren dropping out to pursue work. Another issue was a large urban–rural divide: funding and teacher quality were far better in urban schools than rural, and urban students stayed in school longer.

== Production and cast ==
Not One Less was Zhang Yimou's ninth film, but only the second not to star long-time collaborator Gong Li (the first was his 1997 Keep Cool). For this film, he cast only amateur actors whose real-life names and occupations resembled those of characters they played in the film—as The Philadelphia Inquirer's Steven Rea described the performances, the actors are just "people playing variations of themselves in front of the camera". For instance, Tian Zhenda, who played the mayor, was the real-life mayor of a small village, and the primary actors Wei Minzhi and Zhang Huike were selected from among thousands of students in rural schools. (The names and occupations of the film's main actors are listed in the table below.) The movie was filmed on location at Chicheng County's Shuiquan Primary School, and in the city of Zhangjiakou; both locations are in Hebei province.

The movie was filmed in a documentary-like, "neorealist" style involving hidden cameras and natural lighting. There are also, however, elements of heavy editing—for example, Shelly Kraicer noted that many scenes have frequent, rapid cuts, partially as a result of filming with inexperienced actors.

Zhang had to work closely with government censors during production of the film. He related how the censors "kept reminding [me] not to show China as too backward and too poor", and said that on the title cards at the end of the movie he had to write that the number of rural children dropping out of school each year was one million, although he believed the number was actually three times that. Not One Less was Zhang's first film to enjoy government support and resources.

=== Cast ===
Name	Role	Real-life occupation
Wei Minzhi	Teacher Wei	middle school student
Zhang Huike	class troublemaker, school dropout	primary school student
Tian Zhenda	Mayor Tian	mayor of a village in Yanqing county
Gao Enman	Teacher Gao	village teacher in Yanqing county
Sun Zhimei	helps Wei search for Zhang Huike in the city	middle school student
Feng Yuying	TV station receptionist	ticket clerk
Li Fanfan	TV show host	TV show host
Zhang Yichang	sports recruiter	sports instructor
Xu Zhanqing	brickyard owner	mayor of a village in Yanqing county
Liu Hanzhi	Zhang Huike's sick mother	villager
Ma Guolin	man in bus station	clerk
Wu Wanlu	TV station manager	deputy manager of a broadcasting station
Liu Ru	train station announcer	announcer for a broadcasting station
Wang Shulan	stationery store clerk	stationery store manager
Fu Xinmin	TV show director	TV station head of programming
Bai Mei	restaurant owner	restaurant manager

== Plot ==
Thirteen-year-old Wei Minzhi arrives in Shuiquan village to substitute for the village's only teacher (Gao Enman) while he takes a month's leave to care for his ill mother. When Gao discovers that Wei does not have a high school education and has no special talents, he instructs her to teach by copying his texts onto the board and then making the students copy them into their notebooks; he also tells her not to use more than one piece of chalk per day, because the village is too poor to afford more. Before leaving, he explains to her that many students have recently left school to find work in the cities, and he offers her a 10 yuan bonus if all the students are still there when he returns.

Wei Minzhi, you look after the students. More than ten have already left. I don't want to lose any more. The mayor promised fifty yuan; he'll make sure you get it. If all the students are here when I get back—not one less—you'll get an extra ten yuan.

— Teacher Gao, Not One Less (11:08–11:27)

When Wei begins teaching, she has little rapport with the students: they shout and run around instead of copying their work, and the class troublemaker, Zhang Huike, insists that "she's not a teacher, she's Wei Chunzhi's big sister!" After putting the lesson on the board, Wei usually sits outside, guarding the door to make sure no students leave until they have finished their work. Early in the month, a sports recruiter comes to take one athletic girl, Ming Xinhong, to a special training school; unwilling to let any students leave, Wei hides Ming, and when the village mayor (Tian Zhenda) finds her, Wei chases after their car in a futile attempt to stop them; and yet they, the sports recruiter and mayor, first notice and comment on Wei's running ability, endurance, and tenacity.

One day, after trying to make the troublemaker Zhang apologize for bothering another student, Wei discovers that Zhang has left to go find work in the nearby city of Zhangjiakou. The village mayor is unwilling to give her money for a bus ticket to the city, so she resolves to earn the money herself, and recruits the remaining students to help. One girl suggests that they can make money by moving bricks in a nearby brickyard, and Wei begins giving the students mathematical exercises centered on finding out how much money they need to earn for the bus tickets, how many bricks they need to move, and how much time it will take. Through these exercises and working to earn money, her rapport with the class improves. After earning the money, she reaches the bus station but learns that the price is higher than she thought, and she cannot afford a ticket. Wei ends up walking most of the way to Zhangjiakou.

Location of Zhangjiakou, relative to Beijing

In the city, Wei finds the people that Zhang was supposed to be working with, only to discover that they had lost him at the train station days before. She forces another girl her age, Sun Zhimei, to help her look for Zhang at the train station, but they do not find him. Wei has no success finding Zhang through the public address system and "missing person" posters, so she goes to the local television station to broadcast a missing person notice. The receptionist (Feng Yuying) will not let her in without valid identification, though, and says the only way she can enter is with permission from the station manager, whom she describes as "a man with glasses". For the rest of the day, Wei stands by the station's only gate, stopping every man with glasses, but she does not find the station manager, and spends the night asleep on the street. The next day the station manager (Wu Wanlu) sees her at the gate again, through his window, and lets her in, scolding the receptionist for making her wait outside.

Although Wei has no money to run an ad on TV, the station manager is interested in her story and decides to feature Wei in a talk show special about rural education. On the talk show, Wei is nervous and hardly says a word when the host (Li Fanfan) addresses her, but Zhang—who has been wandering the streets begging for food—sees the show. After Wei and Zhang are reunited, the station manager arranges to have them driven back to Shuiquan village, along with a truckload of school supplies and donations that viewers had sent in. Upon their return, they are greeted by the whole village. In the final scene, Wei presents the students with several boxes of colored chalk that were donated, and allows each student to write one character on the board. The film ends with a series of title cards that recount the actions of the characters after the film ends, and describe the problem of poverty in rural education in China.

== Themes ==
While most of Zhang's early films had been historical epics, Not One Less was one of the first to focus on contemporary China. The film's main theme involves the difficulties faced in providing rural education in China. When Wei Minzhi arrives in Shuiquan village, the teacher Gao has not been paid in six months and the school building is in disrepair, and chalk is in such short supply that Gao gives Wei specific instructions limiting how large her written characters should be. Wei sleeps in the school building, sharing a bed with several female students. The version of the film released overseas ends with a series of title cards in English, the last of which reads, "Each year, poverty forces one million children in China to leave school. Through the help of donations, about 15% of these children return to school."

Not One Less has thematic and stylistic similarities to the work of Iranian director Abbas Kiarostami.

Because the people and locations used in the film are real but are carefully selected and edited, the film creates a "friction" between documentary reality and narrative fiction. This balancing act between the real and the imaginary has drawn comparisons to neorealist works such as those of Iranian directors Abbas Kiarostami and Mohsen Makhmalbaf, and Zhang has openly acknowledged the influence of Kiarostami in this film. Zhang Xiaoling of the University of Nottingham argues that Zhang Yimou used the documentary perspective in order to suggest that the story is an accurate reflection of most rural areas in China, while Shelly Kraicer believes that his "simultaneous presentation of seemingly opposing messages" is a powerful artistic method in of itself, and that it allows Zhang to circumvent censors by guaranteeing that the movie will include at least one message that they like. Jean-Michel Frodon of Le Monde maintains that the film was produced "in the shadow of two superpowers" and needed to make compromises with each.

The film addresses the prominent place that bureaucracy, and verbal negotiation and struggle, occupy in everyday life in China. Many scenes pit Wei against authority figures such as the village mayor, the announcer in the train station, and the TV station receptionist who also acts as a "gatekeeper". Aside from Wei, many characters in the film show a "blind faith" in authority figures. While she lacks money and power, Wei overcomes her obstacles through sheer obstinacy and ignorant persistence, suggesting that speech and perseverance can overcome barriers. Wei becomes an example of "heroic obstinacy" and a model of using determination to face "overwhelming odds". For this reason, the film has been frequently compared to Zhang's 1993 The Story of Qiu Ju, whose heroine is also a determined, stubborn woman; likewise, Qiu Ju is also filmed in a neo-realistic style, set partially in contemporary rural China and partially in the city, and employs mostly amateur actors.

Not One Less portrays the mass media as a locus of power: Wei discovers that only someone with money or connections can gain access to a television station, but once someone is on camera she or he becomes part of an "invisible media hegemony" with the power to "manipulate social behavior", catching people's attention where paper advertisements could not and moving cityfolk to donate money to a country school. The power of television within the film's story, according to Laikwan Pang of the Chinese University of Hong Kong, reflects its prominent place in Chinese society of the late 1990s, when domestic cinema was floundering but television was developing quickly; Pang argues that television-watching forms a "collective consciousness" for Chinese citizens, and that the way television unifies people in Not One Less is an illustration of this.

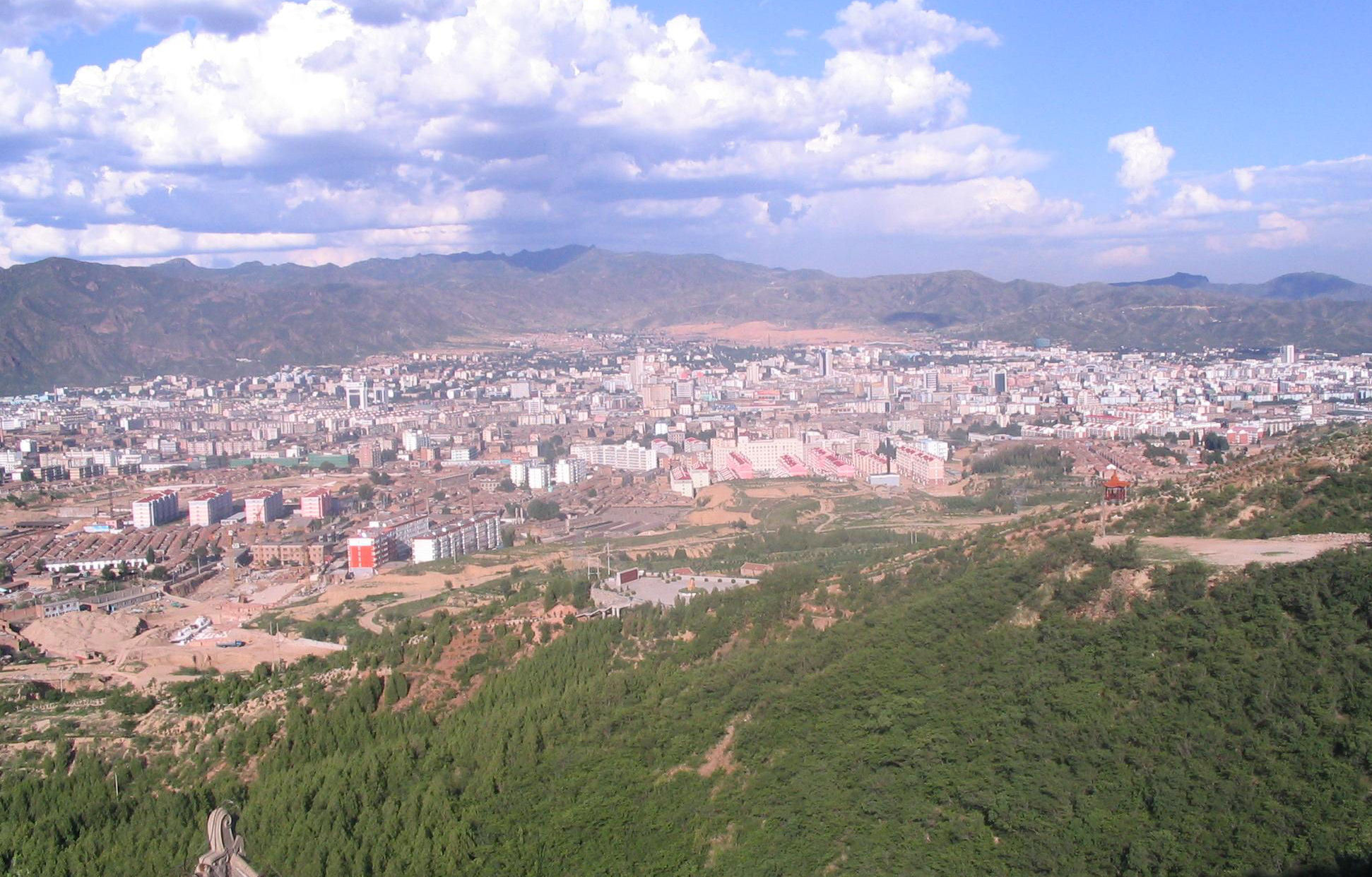
Zhangjiakou, where the "urban" half of the film takes place

Money is important throughout the film. Concerns about money dominate much of the film—for example, a large portion is devoted to Wei and her students' attempt to earn enough money for bus tickets—as well as motivating them. Most major characters, including Wei, demand payment for their actions, and it is left unclear whether Wei's search for Zhang Huike is motivated by altruism or by the promise of a 10-yuan bonus. Zhu Ying points out the prominence of money in the film creates a conflict between traditional Confucian values (such as the implication that the solutions to Wei's problems can be found through the help of authority figures) and modern, capitalist and individualistic society.

Finally, the film illustrates the growing urban–rural divide in China. When Wei reaches Zhangjiakou, the film creates a clear contrast between urban and rural life, and the two locations are physically separated by a dark tunnel. The city is not portrayed as idyllic; rather, Zhang shows that rural people are faced with difficulties and discrimination in the cities. While Wei's first view of the city exposes her to well-dressed people and modern buildings, the living quarters she goes to while searching for Zhang Huike are cramped and squalid. Likewise, the iron gate where Wei waits all day for the TV station director reflects the barriers poor people face to survival in the city, and the necessity of connections to avoid becoming an "outsider" in the city. Frequent cuts show Wei and Zhang wandering aimlessly in the streets, Zhang begging for food, and Wei sleeping on the sidewalk; when an enthusiastic TV host later asks Zhang what part of the city left the biggest impression, Zhang replies that the one thing he will never forget is having to beg for food. A.O. Scott of The New York Times compared the "unbearable" despair of the film's second half to that of Vittorio De Sica's 1948 Bicycle Thieves.

== Reception ==
=== Cannes withdrawal ===
I cannot accept that when it comes to Chinese films, the West seems for a long time to have had just the one 'political' reading: if it's not "against the government" then it's "for the government". The naïveté and lack of perspective [lit. "one-sidedness"] of using so simple a concept to judge a film is obvious. With respect to the works of directors from America, France and Italy for example, I doubt you have the same point of view.

— Zhang Yimou (20 April 1999). Beijing Youth Daily.

Neither Not One Less nor Zhang's other 1999 film The Road Home was selected for the 1999 Cannes Film Festival's Official Selection, the most prestigious competition in the festival, where several of Zhang's earlier films had won awards. The rationale is uncertain; Shelly Kraicer and Zhang Xiaoling claim that Cannes officials viewed the Not One Less' happy ending, with the main characters' conflicts resolved by the generosity of city dwellers and higher-up officials, as pro-China propaganda, while Zhu Ying claims that the officials saw it and The Road Home as too anti-government. Rather than have his films shown in a less competitive portion of the festival, Zhang withdrew them both in protest, stating that the movies were apolitical. In an open letter published in the Beijing Youth Daily, Zhang accused the festival of being motivated by other than artistic concerns, and criticized the Western perception that all Chinese films must be either "pro-government" or "anti-government", referring to it as a "discrimination against Chinese films".

=== Critical response ===
Not One Less has an approval rating of 96% on review aggregator website Rotten Tomatoes, based on 47 reviews, and an average rating of 7.6/10. Metacritic assigned the film a weighted average score of 73 out of 100, based on 22 critics, indicating "generally favorable reviews".

Many focused on the film's ending title cards: several compared them to a public service announcement, and Philip Kemp of Sight & Sound wrote, "All that's missing is the address we should send donations to." Zhang Xiaoling, on the other hand, considered the titles to be an implicit criticism of the state of rural education in China, saying, "the news that voluntary contributions have helped 15 percent of the pupils to return to school is aimed to give rise to a question: what about the remaining 85 percent?" The disagreement about the title cards is also reflected in the critical reaction to the rest of the film's resolution. Kemp described the ending as "feelgood" and criticized the film for portraying officials and generous cityfolk as coming to the rescue, The Washington Post's Desson Howe called the ending "flag-waving", and The Independent's Gilbert Adair called it "sugary". Alberto Barbera of the Venice Film Festival, on the other hand, said that while the end of the film may have been like propaganda, the rest was a "strong denunciation of a regime that is unable to assure proper education for the country children". Likewise, Zhang Xiaoling argued that although the film superficially appears to praise the city people and officials, its subtext is harshly critical of them: he pointed out that the apparently benevolent TV station manager seems to be motivated more by audience ratings than by altruism, that the receptionist's callous manner towards Wei is a result of Chinese "bureaucratism and nepotism", and that for all the good things about the city, Zhang Huike's clearest memory of city life is having to beg for food. Zhang and Kraicer both argued that critics who see the film as pro-government propaganda are missing the point and, as Kraicer put it, "mistaking [one] layer as the message of the film ... mistaking the part for the whole". David Ansen of Newsweek and Leigh Paatsch of the Herald Sun each pointed out that, while the film is "deceptive[ly]" positive at face value, it has harsh criticism "bubbling under the surface". Chinese critics Liu Xinyi and Xu Su of Movie Review recognized the dispute abroad over whether the film was pro- or anti-government, but made no comment; they praised the film for its realistic portrayal of hardships facing rural people, without speculating about whether Zhang intended to criticize or praise the government's handling of those hardships. Hao Jian of Film Appreciation, on the other hand, was more critical, claiming that the movie was organized around a political message and was intended to be pro-government. Hao said that Not One Less marked the beginning of Zhang's transformation from an outspoken independent director to one of the government's favorites.

Overall, critics were impressed with the performances of the amateur actors, and Jean-Michel Frodon of Le Monde called that the film's greatest success. Peter Rainer of New York Magazine praised the scene of Wei's interview on TV as "one of the most improbably satisfying love scenes on film". The film also received praise for its artistic merits and Hou Yong's cinematography, even though its visuals were simplistic compared to Zhang's previous films; for example, A.O. Scott of The New York Times praised the "richness" displayed by the film despite its deliberate scarcity of color. Reviewers also pointed out that Zhang had succeeded in breaking away from the "commercial entertainment wave" of popular film. Noel Vera of BusinessWorld writes that the film concerns itself mainly with emotional impact, at the expense of visual extravagance, making it the opposite of earlier Zhang Yimou films such as Red Sorghum. Other critics noted the strength of the film's storytelling; for instance, Rainer called the film an "uncommon, and uncommonly moving, love story", and Film Journal International's Kevin Lally described it as "a poignant story of poverty and spirit reminiscent of the great Italian neo-realists." Another well-received part of the film was the segment in which Wei teaches math by creating practical examples out of her attempt to raise money for the bus to Zhangjiakou; in the Chinese journal Teacher Doctrines, Mao Wen wrote that teachers should learn from Wei's example and provide students with practical exercises.

Wei Minzhi's character received mixed reactions: Scott described her as a "heroic" character who demonstrates how obstinacy can be a virtue, whereas Richard Corliss of Time says she is "no brighter or more resourceful than [her students]". Reactions to the city portion of the movie were also mixed: while Zhang describes the second half of the film as an eloquent commentary on China's urban-rural divide and Kevin Lally calls it "startling", Kemp criticizes it for being a predictable "Victorian cliché".

=== Box office and release ===
Rights to distribute the film were purchased by the China Film Group Corporation, a state-sponsored organization, and the government actively promoted the film. It was officially released in mainland China in April 1999, although there were showings as early as mid-February. Sheldon H. Lu reports that the film grossed ¥18 million, an average amount, in its first three months of showing; by the end of its run in November, it sold ¥40 million at the box office. (In comparison, Zhang's 2002 film Hero would earn ¥270 million three years later.) Nevertheless, Not One Less was the highest-grossing domestic film of 1999, and Laikwan Pang has called it a "box office success". In the United States, the film was released in theaters on 18 February 2000, and grossed $50,256 in its first weekend and $592,586 overall; The release was handled by Sony Pictures Classics, and home video distribution by Columbia TriStar; Not One Less was Columbia's first Chinese film.

Lu warns that domestic box office sales are not reliable indicators of a film's popularity in mainland China, because of piracy and because of state or social group sponsorship; many workers were given free tickets to promote the film, and a 1999 report claimed that more tickets were purchased by the government than by individuals. The film was more popular than most government-promoted films touting the party line and Lu claims that it had "tremendous social support", but Pang points out that its success was "not purely egalitarian, but partly constructed."

At the time of Not One Less' release, DVD and VCD piracy was a growing concern in mainland China, and the China Copyright Office issued a notice forbidding unauthorized production or distribution of the film. This was the first time China had enacted special copyright protections for a domestic film. On 21 April 1999, Hubei province's Culture Office issued an "Urgent Notice for Immediate Confiscation of Pirated Not One Less VCDs", and two days later the Culture Office and movie company joined forces to conduct raids on ten audio-video stores, seizing pirated discs from six of them.

=== Awards ===
Although it was withdrawn from Cannes, Not One Less went on to win the Golden Lion, the top award at the Venice Film Festival. Zhang also received a best director award at the Golden Rooster, mainland China's most prestigious award ceremony, and the film was voted one of the top three of the year in the Hundred Flowers Awards. Awards the film won or was nominated for are listed below.

Awards	Year	Category	Result	Notes
Venice Film Festival	1999	Golden Lion	Won	
Venice Film Festival	1999	Lanterna Magica award	Won	
Venice Film Festival	1999	Sergio Trasatti award	Won	
Venice Film Festival	1999	UNICEF award	Won	
Golden Rooster Awards	1999	Best Director	Won	
Hundred Flowers Awards	1999	Best Picture	Won	with two other films
Shanghai Film Critics Awards	1999	Film of Merit	Won	
Shanghai Film Critics Awards	1999	Best Director	Won	
Beijing Student Film Festival	1999	Jury Award: Best Film	Won	
China Obelisk Film Awards	1999	Outstanding Film Director	Won	with two other directors
China Obelisk Film Awards	1999	Outstanding Feature Film	Won	with nine other films
São Paulo International Film Festival	1999	Audience Award: Best Feature	Won	
European Film Awards	1999	Screen International Award	Nominated	
Golden Bauhinia Awards	2000	Top 10 Chinese films	Won	with nine other films
Young Artist Awards	2000	Best International Film	Won	
Young Artist Awards	2000	Best Performance in an International Film (Young Performer)	Won	
Kinema Junpo Awards	2001	Best Foreign Language Film Director	Won	
Isfahan International Festival of Films for Children & Young Adults	2001	Golden Butterfly	Won	
Changchun Film Festival	2008	Golden Deer: Outstanding Film in Rural Theme	Won	with four other films
