= List of thriller films of the 1990s =

A list of thriller films released in the 1990s.

Title	Director	Cast	Country	Subgenre/notes
1990
After Dark, My Sweet	James Foley	Jason Patric, Rachel Ward, Bruce Dern	United States	Psychological thriller
The Ambulance	Larry Cohen	Eric Roberts, James Earl Jones, Red Buttons	United States}	
Bala at Rosaryo	Pepe Marcos	Ramon "Bong" Revilla, Jr., Eddie Garcia, Efren Reyes, Jr.	Philippines	Action thriller
Bad Influence	Curtis Hanson	Rob Lowe, James Spader, Lisa Zane, Christian Clemenson	United States	
Biktima	Lino Brocka	Sharon Cuneta, Christopher de Leon, Rowell Santiago, Nanette Medved	Philippines	Thriller drama
Blue Steel	Kathryn Bigelow	Jamie Lee Curtis, Ron Silver, Clancy Brown, Elizabeth Pena, Louise Fletcher	United States	Action thriller
Bullet in the Head	John Woo	Tony Leung, Jacky Cheung	Hong Kong	Action thriller
Dancing Machine	Gilles Behat	Alain Delon, Claude Brasseur, Patrick Dupond	France	
Darkman	Sam Raimi	Liam Neeson, Frances McDormand, Colin Friels	United States	Science fiction action thriller
Delta Force 2: The Colombian Connection	Aaron Norris	Chuck Norris, Billy Drago, Bobby Chavez	United States	Action thriller
Desperate Hours	Michael Cimino	Mickey Rourke, Anthony Hopkins, Mimi Rogers, Lindsay Crouse, Kelly Lynch, Elias Koteas, David Morse, Shawnee Smith	United States	
Die Hard 2	Renny Harlin	Bruce Willis, Bonnie Bedelia, Reginald VelJohnson, William Atherton, William Sadler	United States	Action thriller
La Femme Nikita	Luc Besson	Anne Parillaud, Jean-Hugues Anglade, Tchéky Karyo	France; Italy	
Flatliners	Joel Schumacher	Kiefer Sutherland, Julia Roberts, Kevin Bacon, William Baldwin, Oliver Platt	United States	
The Guardian	William Friedkin	Jenny Seagrove, Dwier Brown, Carey Lowell	United States	
Hidden Agenda	Ken Loach	Frances McDormand, Brian Cox	United Kingdom	
The Hot Spot	Dennis Hopper	Don Johnson, Virginia Madsen, Jennifer Connelly	United States	
The Hunt for Red October	John McTiernan	Sean Connery, Alec Baldwin, James Earl Jones, Scott Glenn, Sam Neill, Tim Curry	United States	
Impulse	Sondra Locke	Theresa Russell, Jeff Fahey, George Dzundza	United States	
Internal Affairs	Mike Figgis	Richard Gere, Andy García, Nancy Travis, Laurie Metcalf, Richard Bradford, William Baldwin, Michael Beach, John Kapelos	United States	
Ikasa Mo, Ipuputok Ko!	Augusto Salvador	Phillip Salvador, Maila Gumila, Sheila Ysrael, Eddie Garcia, Michael de Mesa, Dindo Arroyo	Philippines	Action thriller
Jacob's Ladder	Adrian Lyne	Tim Robbins, Elizabeth Peña, Danny Aiello	United States	
Kaaway ng Batas	Pepe Marcos	Rudy Fernandez, Star Querubin, Zaldy Zshornack, Gabby Concepcion, Efren Reyes Jr., Edu Manzano	Philippines	Action thriller
Kill Cruise	Peter Keglevic	Jürgen Prochnow, Patsy Kensit, Elizabeth Hurley	Germany	
Kindergarten Cop	Ivan Reitman	Arnold Schwarzenegger, Penelope Ann Miller, Pamela Reed, Linda Hunt, Richard Tyson, Carroll Baker	United States	
Lionheart	Sheldon Lettich	Jean-Claude Van Damme	United States	Action thriller
Marked for Death	Dwight H. Little	Steven Seagal, Basil Wallace, Keith David, Joanna Pacuła	United States	Action thriller
Miller's Crossing	Joel Coen	Gabriel Byrne, Albert Finney, Marcia Gay Harden, John Turturro, Jon Polito, J. E. Freeman	United States	Crime thriller
Misery	Rob Reiner	James Caan, Kathy Bates	United States	
Narrow Margin	Peter Hyams	Gene Hackman, Anne Archer, James B. Sikking	United States	
Navy SEALS	Lewis Teague	Charlie Sheen, Michael Biehn, Joanne Whalley, Rick Rossovich, Bill Paxton, Dennis Haysbert	United States	Action thriller
Pacific Heights	John Schlesinger	Michael Keaton, Melanie Griffith, Matthew Modine, Laurie Metcalf, Mako, Dorian Harewood, Carl Lumbly, Beverly D'Angelo	United States	
Presumed Innocent	Alan J. Pakula	Harrison Ford, Brian Dennehy, Raúl Juliá, Bonnie Bedelia, Greta Scacchi, Paul Winfield	United States	
A Shock to the System	Jan Egleson	Michael Caine, Elizabeth McGovern, Peter Riegert, Swoosie Kurtz, Will Patton, Jenny Wright	United States	
A Show of Force	Bruno Barreto	Amy Irving, Robert Duvall, Andy García, Lou Diamond Phillips	United States	
State of Grace	Phil Joanou	Sean Penn, Ed Harris, Gary Oldman, Robin Wright Penn, John Turturro	United States	Crime thriller
1991
Backdraft	Ron Howard	Kurt Russell, William Baldwin, Scott Glenn, Jennifer Jason Leigh, Rebecca De Mornay, Donald Sutherland, Robert De Niro	United States	
Cape Fear	Martin Scorsese	Robert De Niro, Nick Nolte, Jessica Lange, Juliette Lewis	United States	
Closet Land	Radha Bharadwaj	Madeleine Stowe, Alan Rickman	United States	Psychological thriller
Dead Again	Kenneth Branagh	Kenneth Branagh, Emma Thompson, Andy García, Derek Jacobi	United States	
Deceived	Damian Harris	Goldie Hawn, John Heard, Robin Bartlett, Ashley Peldon	United States	
Do or Die	Andy Sidaris	Erik Estrada, Dona Speir, Roberta Vasquez	United States	Action thriller
JFK	Oliver Stone	Kevin Costner, Sissy Spacek, Kevin Bacon, Tommy Lee Jones, Laurie Metcalf, Gary Oldman	United States	
A Kiss Before Dying	James Dearden	Matt Dillon, Sean Young, Max von Sydow, Diane Ladd, James Russo	United States	
The Last Boy Scout	Tony Scott	Bruce Willis, Damon Wayans, Chelsea Field, Noble Willingham, Taylor Negron, Danielle Harris, Halle Berry	United States	Crime thriller
Lower Level	Kristine Peterson	Jeff Yagher, David Bradley, Elizabeth Gracen	United States	Erotic thriller
Mortal Thoughts	Alan Rudolph	Demi Moore, Glenne Headly, Bruce Willis, John Pankow, Harvey Keitel	United States	
Netchaïev Est de Retour	Jacques Deray	Vincent Lindon, Yves Montand, Miou-Miou	France; Italy	
One False Move	Carl Franklin	Bill Paxton, Cynda Williams, Billy Bob Thornton, Michael Beach, Jim Metzler	United States	
Out for Justice	John Flynn	Steven Seagal, William Forsythe, Jerry Orbach	United States	Action thriller
Point Break	Kathryn Bigelow	Patrick Swayze, Keanu Reeves, Gary Busey, Lori Petty, John C. McGinley, James LeGros	United States	Action thriller
Ricochet	Russell Mulcahy	Denzel Washington, John Lithgow, Ice-T, Lindsay Wagner	United States	
Run	Geoff Burrowes	Patrick Dempsey, Kelly Preston, Ken Pogue, Alan C. Peterson	United States	Action thriller
Scissors	Frank de Felitta	Sharon Stone, Ronny Cox, Michelle Phillips	United States	Psychological thriller
Shadows and Fog	Woody Allen	Woody Allen, Mia Farrow, John Malkovich	United States	Comedy thriller
Shattered	Wolfgang Petersen	Tom Berenger, Greta Scacchi, Bob Hoskins, Joanne Whalley, Corbin Bernsen	United States; Germany	
The Silence of the Lambs	Jonathan Demme	Jodie Foster, Anthony Hopkins, Scott Glenn, Ted Levine	United States	
Sleeping with the Enemy	Joseph Ruben	Julia Roberts, Patrick Bergin, Kevin Anderson	United States	
Trancers II	Charles Band	Tim Thomerson, Helen Hunt, Megan Ward	United States	Action thriller,
Where Sleeping Dogs Lie	Charles Finch	Dylan McDermott, Tom Sizemore, Sharon Stone	United States	Crime thriller
Year of the Gun	John Frankenheimer	Andrew McCarthy, Valeria Golino, Sharon Stone	United States	
1992
Basic Instinct	Paul Verhoeven	Michael Douglas, Sharon Stone, Jeanne Tripplehorn, George Dzundza	United States	Erotic thriller
Batman Returns	Tim Burton	Michael Keaton, Michelle Pfeiffer, Danny DeVito, Christopher Walken, Pat Hingle, Michael Gough	United States	Action thriller
Blown Away	Brenton Spencer	Corey Haim, Nicole Eggert, Gary Farmer, Corey Feldman, Kathleen Robertson	Canada	Erotic thriller
The Bodyguard	Mick Jackson	Kevin Costner, Whitney Houston, Gary Kemp	United States	
Boy Praning: Utak Pulbura	Francis "Jun" Posadas	Ian Veneracion, Monica Herrera, Mark Gil, Michael de Mesa, Roy Alvarez, Roi Vinzon, Lito Legaspi, John Estrada, Anjo Yllana, Gabriel Romulo	Philippines	Action thriller
Consenting Adults	Alan J. Pakula	Kevin Kline, Mary Elizabeth Mastrantonio, Kevin Spacey, Rebecca Miller, Forest Whitaker	United States	
The Crying Game	Neil Jordan	Stephen Rea, Jaye Davidson, Miranda Richardson, Forest Whitaker	United Kingdom; Ireland; United States	Political thriller
Deep Cover	Bill Duke	Laurence Fishburne, Jeff Goldblum, Victoria Dillard	United States	Crime thriller
Desire and Hell at Sunset Motel	Alan Castle	Sherilyn Fenn, Whip Hubley, David Hewlett	United States	
Final Analysis	Phil Joanou	Richard Gere, Kim Basinger, Uma Thurman, Eric Roberts, Keith David	United States	
Full Contact	Ringo Lam	Chow Yun-fat	Hong Kong	Action thriller
A Grande Arte	Walter Salles Jr.	Peter Coyote, Tchéky Karyo, Amanda Pays	Brazil; United States	
Hard Boiled	John Woo	Chow Yun-fat, Bowie Lam, Philip Chan	Hong Kong	Action thriller
The Hand That Rocks the Cradle	Curtis Hanson	Annabella Sciorra, Rebecca De Mornay, Matt McCoy, Ernie Hudson, Julianne Moore	United States	
Jennifer Eight	Bruce Robinson	Andy García, Uma Thurman, John Malkovich, Lance Henriksen, Graham Beckel, Kathy Baker	United States	
Love Crimes	Lizzie Borden	Sean Young, Patrick Bergin, Arnetia Walker	United States	
El Mariachi	Robert Rodriguez	Carlos Gallardo, Consuelo Gomez, Reinol Martinez, Peter Marquardt	United States	Action thriller
Patriot Games	Phillip Noyce	Harrison Ford, Anne Archer, Sean Bean, Patrick Bergin, James Earl Jones, Polly Walker, Richard Harris	United States	Action thriller, political thriller
Poison Ivy	Andy Ruben, Katt Shea Ruben	Sara Gilbert, Drew Barrymore, Tom Skerritt, Cheryl Ladd	United States	Erotic thriller
The Public Eye	Howard Franklin	Joe Pesci, Barbara Hershey, Stanley Tucci	United States	Crime thriller
Raising Cain	Brian De Palma	John Lithgow, Lolita Davidovich, Steven Bauer	United States	
Reservoir Dogs	Quentin Tarantino	Harvey Keitel, Tim Roth, Michael Madsen, Chris Penn, Steve Buscemi, Lawrence Tierney	United States	Crime thriller
The Sentinel	Arnaud Desplechin	Emmanuel Salinger, Thibault de Montalembert, Jean-Louis Richard	France	
Single White Female	Barbet Schroeder	Bridget Fonda, Jennifer Jason Leigh, Steven Weber, Peter Friedman, Stephen Tobolowsky	United States	
Sneakers	Phil Alden Robinson	Robert Redford, Sidney Poitier, Ben Kingsley, Mary McDonnell, Dan Aykroyd, River Phoenix, David Strathairn	United States	
Storyville	Mark Frost	James Spader, Joanne Whalley, Jason Robards Jr.	United States	
Toutes peines confondues	Michel Deville	Jacques Dutronc, Patrick Bruel, Mathilda May	France	
Twin Peaks: Fire Walk with Me	David Lynch	Kyle MacLachlan, Sheryl Lee, Chris Isaak, Kiefer Sutherland	United States	Psychological thriller
Under Siege	Andrew Davis	Steven Seagal, Tommy Lee Jones, Gary Busey, Erika Eleniak, Colm Meaney	United States	Action thriller
Unlawful Entry	Jonathan Kaplan	Kurt Russell, Ray Liotta, Madeleine Stowe, Roger E. Mosley	United States	
Whispers in the Dark	Christopher Crowe	Annabella Sciorra, Jamey Sheridan, Alan Alda, Anthony LaPaglia, Jill Clayburgh, John Leguizamo, Deborah Kara Unger, Anthony Heald	United States	
Zipperface	Mansour Pourmand	David Clover, Donna Adams, Jonathan Mandell	United States	Horror thriller
1993
Body of Evidence	Uli Edel	Madonna, Willem Dafoe, Joe Mantegna, Anne Archer, Julianne Moore, Jürgen Prochnow	United States	Erotic thriller
Boiling Point	James B. Harris	Wesley Snipes, Dennis Hopper, Lolita Davidovich, Viggo Mortensen, Dan Hedaya	United States	Crime thriller
Cliffhanger	Renny Harlin	Sylvester Stallone, John Lithgow, Michael Rooker, Janine Turner	United States	Action thriller
The Crush	Alan Shapiro	Alicia Silverstone, Cary Elwes, Jennifer Rubin, Kurtwood Smith	United States	Erotic thriller
Doppelganger	Avi Nesher	Drew Barrymore, George Newbern, Dennis Christopher, Leslie Hope, Sally Kellerman	United States	
The Escort	Ricky Tognazzi	Claudio Amendola, Enrico Lo Verso, Carlo Cecchi	Italy	
The Firm	Sydney Pollack	Tom Cruise, Jeanne Tripplehorn, Gene Hackman, Holly Hunter, Ed Harris, Hal Holbrook, Wilford Brimley, David Strathairn	United States	
The Fugitive	Andrew Davis	Harrison Ford, Tommy Lee Jones, Joe Pantoliano, Sela Ward, Jeroen Krabbe, Andreas Katsulas, Julianne Moore	United States	
The Good Son	Joseph Ruben	Macaulay Culkin, Elijah Wood, Wendy Crewson, David Morse, Daniel Hugh Kelly	United States	
Guilty as Sin	Sidney Lumet	Rebecca De Mornay, Don Johnson, Stephen Lang, Jack Warden	United States	
Hard Target	John Woo	Jean-Claude Van Damme, Lance Henriksen, Yancy Butler, Wilford Brimley, Arnold Vosloo, Kasi Lemmons	United States	Action thriller
In the Line of Fire	Wolfgang Petersen	Clint Eastwood, John Malkovich, Rene Russo, Dylan McDermott, Gary Cole, Fred Dalton Thompson	United States	
The Innocent	John Schlesinger	Isabella Rossellini, Anthony Hopkins, Campbell Scott	Germany; United Kingdom	
Judgment Night	Stephen Hopkins	Emilio Estevez, Cuba Gooding Jr., Denis Leary, Stephen Dorff, Jeremy Piven	United States	
Jurassic Park	Steven Spielberg	Sam Neill, Laura Dern, Jeff Goldblum, Richard Attenborough	United States	Science fiction thriller
Kalifornia	Dominic Sena	Brad Pitt, Juliette Lewis, David Duchovny, Michelle Forbes	United States	Crime thriller
Leonardo Delos Reyes, Alyas Waway	Toto Natividad	Cesar Montano, Jun Aristorenas, Cristina Gonzales, Bembol Roco, Joel Torre	Philippines	Biographical action thriller
Malice	Harold Becker	Alec Baldwin, Nicole Kidman, Bill Pullman, Peter Gallagher, Bebe Neuwirth, Josef Sommer, Anne Bancroft, George C. Scott	United States	
Manhattan Murder Mystery	Woody Allen	Woody Allen, Diane Keaton, Alan Alda, Anjelica Huston	United States	Comedy thriller
The Pelican Brief	Alan J. Pakula	Julia Roberts, Denzel Washington, Sam Shepard, John Heard, Stanley Tucci, Tony Goldwyn, William Atherton, Hume Cronyn, John Lithgow	United States	
Point of No Return	John Badham	Bridget Fonda, Gabriel Byrne, Dermot Mulroney, Anne Bancroft, Harvey Keitel	United States	
Public Access	Bryan Singer	Ron Marquette, Larry Maxwell, Brandon Boyce	United States	
Pugoy – Hostage: Davao	Francis "Jun" Posadas	Ian Veneracion, Lito Legaspi, Roy Alvarez, Gina Pangle, Mark Gil	Philippines	Biographical action thriller
Red Rock West	John Dahl	Nicolas Cage, Dennis Hopper, Lara Flynn Boyle, J.T. Walsh	United States	Crime thriller
Romeo Is Bleeding	Peter Medak	Gary Oldman, Lena Olin, Annabella Sciorra, Juliette Lewis, Roy Scheider	United States; United Kingdom	
Sliver	Phillip Noyce	Sharon Stone, William Baldwin, Tom Berenger, Martin Landau, Polly Walker, Nina Foch, CCH Pounder, Colleen Camp	United States	
The Temp	Tom Holland	Timothy Hutton, Lara Flynn Boyle, Faye Dunaway, Dwight Schultz, Oliver Platt, Steven Weber	United States	
Trauma	Dario Argento	Chris Rydell, Asia Argento, Piper Laurie	Italy; United States	Psychological thriller
True Romance	Tony Scott	Christian Slater, Patricia Arquette, Dennis Hopper, Val Kilmer, Gary Oldman, Brad Pitt, Christopher Walken	United States	Crime thriller
The Untold Story	Herman Yau	Danny Lee, Anthony Wong, Emily Kwan	Hong Kong	Crime thriller
The Vanishing	George Sluizer	Jeff Bridges, Kiefer Sutherland, Nancy Travis, Sandra Bullock	United States	
The Vizconde Massacre: God Help Us	Carlo J. Caparas	Romeo Vasquez, Kris Aquino, Aurora Salve, Lady Lee, John Regala, Marco Polo Garcia, Tommy Abuel, Robert Arevalo	Philippines	Biographical thriller drama
1994
Amateur	Hal Hartley	Isabelle Huppert, Martin Donovan, Elina Löwensohn	United States; France; United Kingdom	
Angel Dust	Toshihiro Ishii	Kaho Minami, Takeshi Wakamatsu, Etsushi Toyokawa	Japan	
The Cecilia Masagca Story: Antipolo Massacre (Jesus Save Us!)	Carlo J. Caparas	Dawn Zulueta, Cesar Montano, Romeo Vasquez, Boots Anson-Roa, Robert Arevalo, Joel Torre, Richard Bonnin, Celso Ad Castillo, Liezl Martinez, Angelica Panganiban	Philippines	Biographical thriller drama
Blink	Michael Apted	Madeleine Stowe, Aidan Quinn, James Remar, Peter Friedman, Bruce A. Young, Laurie Metcalf	United States	
Blown Away	Stephen Hopkins	Jeff Bridges, Tommy Lee Jones, Suzy Amis, Forest Whitaker, Lloyd Bridges	United States	Action thriller
Blue Tiger	Norberto Barba	Virginia Madsen, Toru Nakamura, Dean Hallo	United States	
China Moon	John Bailey	Ed Harris, Madeleine Stowe, Benicio del Toro, Charles Dance	United States	
Clear and Present Danger	Phillip Noyce	Harrison Ford, Willem Dafoe, Anne Archer, James Earl Jones	United States	Action thriller
The Client	Joel Schumacher	Susan Sarandon, Tommy Lee Jones, Brad Renfro, Mary-Louise Parker, Anthony LaPaglia, Anthony Edwards, J.T. Walsh, Ossie Davis	United States	
Color of Night	Richard Rush	Bruce Willis, Jane March, Ruben Blades, Lesley Ann Warren, Scott Bakula, Brad Dourif, Lance Henriksen, Kevin J. O'Connor	United States	Erotic thriller
The Cool Surface	Erik Anjou	Robert Patrick, Teri Hatcher	United States	
The Crow	Alex Proyas	Brandon Lee, Ernie Hudson, Michael Wincott	United States	
Death and the Maiden	Roman Polanski	Sigourney Weaver, Ben Kingsley, Stuart Wilson	United Kingdom; United States; France	
Dream Lover	Nicholas Kazan	James Spader, Mädchen Amick, Bess Armstrong	United States	
Drop Zone	John Badham	Wesley Snipes, Gary Busey, Yancy Butler, Michael Jeter, Kyle Secor, Corin Nemec	United States	Action thriller
The Elsa Castillo Story: Ang Katotohanan	Laurice Guillen	Kris Aquino, Eric Quizon, Miguel Rodriguez, Johnny Delgado	Philippines	Biographical thriller drama
The Elsa Castillo Story: The Chop Chop Lady	Edgardo Vinarao	Lorna Tolentino, Mark Gil, Mat Ranillo III	Philippines	Biographical thriller drama
Exit to Eden	Garry Marshall	Dana Delany, Paul Mercurio, Rosie O'Donnell, Dan Aykroyd	United States	
The Getaway	Roger Donaldson	Alec Baldwin, Kim Basinger, Michael Madsen, James Woods, David Morse, Jennifer Tilly, James Stephens, Richard Farnsworth, Philip Seymour Hoffman, Burton Gilliam	United States	Action thriller, crime thriller
Heavenly Creatures	Peter Jackson	Melanie Lynskey, Kate Winslet, Sarah Peirse	New Zealand	Psychological thriller, Crime thriller, Drama
Killing Zoe	Roger Avary	Eric Stoltz, Julie Delpy, Jean-Hugues Anglade	United States; France	
The Last Seduction	John Dahl	Linda Fiorentino, Peter Berg, Bill Pullman	United States	Erotic thriller
Léon: The Professional	Luc Besson	Jean Reno, Gary Oldman, Natalie Portman, Danny Aiello	France	
Mother's Boys	Yves Simoneau	Jamie Lee Curtis, Peter Gallagher, Joanne Whalley, Vanessa Redgrave	United States	
Mute Witness	Anthony Waller	Marina Zudina, Oleg Yankovsky, Evan Richards	United Kingdom; Germany	
Nightwatch	Ole Bornedal	Nikolaj Waldau, Kim Bodnia, Lotte Andersen	Denmark	
On Deadly Ground	Steven Seagal	Steven Seagal, Michael Caine, Joan Chen, John C. McGinley, R. Lee Ermey, Shari Shattuck, Billy Bob Thornton, Richard Hamilton, John Trudell, Mike Starr, Sven-Ole Thorsen, Irvin Kershner, Bart the Bear, Frank “Sonny” Sisto	United States	Action thriller
L'Ours en peluche	Jacques Deray	Alain Delon, Francesca Dellera, Regina Bianchi	France; Italy	
The Patriots	Eric Rochant	Yvan Attal, Yossi Banai, Dan Toren	France	
Pedrito Masangkay: Walang Bakas Na Iniiwan	Francis 'Jun' Posadas	Ian Veneracion, Andy Poe, Cristina Gonzales, Elizabeth Tamayo, Dick Israel	Philippines	Action thriller
The River Wild	Curtis Hanson	Meryl Streep, Kevin Bacon, David Strathairn, Joseph Mazzello, John C. Reilly, Benjamin Bratt, Elizabeth Hoffman, Victor Galloway, Diane Delano, Thomas F. Duffy, William Lucking, Paul Cantelon, Glenn Morshower, Stephanie Sawye	United States	
Shallow Grave	Danny Boyle	Kerry Fox, Christopher Eccleston, Ewan McGregor	United Kingdom	Crime thriller
Silent Fall	Bruce Beresford	Richard Dreyfuss, John Lithgow, Linda Hamilton, J. T. Walsh, Liv Tyler	United States	
The Specialist	Luis Llosa	Sylvester Stallone, Sharon Stone, James Woods, Rod Steiger, Eric Roberts	United States	Action thriller
Speed	Jan de Bont	Keanu Reeves, Dennis Hopper, Sandra Bullock, Jeff Daniels, Joe Morton	United States	Crime thriller, action thriller
Surviving the Game	Ernest R. Dickerson	Ice-T, Rutger Hauer, Gary Busey, Charles S. Dutton, F. Murray Abraham, John C. McGinley, William McNamara	United States	
Terminal Velocity	Deran Sarafian	Charlie Sheen, Nastassja Kinski, James Gandolfini, Christopher McDonald	United States	Action thriller
True Lies	James Cameron	Arnold Schwarzenegger, Jamie Lee Curtis, Tom Arnold, Bill Paxton, Art Malik, Tia Carrere, Eliza Dushku	United States	Action thriller
The Vizconde Massacre 2: May the Lord Be with Us!	Carlo J. Caparas	Romeo Vasquez, Vina Morales, Elizabeth Oropesa, Charina Scott, Rommel Padilla, Joko Diaz, Tommy Abuel, Robert Arevalo	Philippines	Biographical thriller drama
1995
12 Monkeys	Terry Gilliam	Bruce Willis, Madeleine Stowe, Brad Pitt	United States	Science fiction thriller
Assassins	Richard Donner	Sylvester Stallone, Antonio Banderas, Julianne Moore	United States	
Bad Boys	Michael Bay	Martin Lawrence, Will Smith, Tea Leoni, Tcheky Karyo, Theresa Randle, Joe Pantoliano	United States	Action thriller
Bad Company	Damian Harris	Ellen Barkin, Laurence Fishburne, Frank Langella	United States	
Citizen X	Chris Gerolmo	Stephen Rea, Donald Sutherland, Max von Sydow	United States	Television film
Coldblooded	Matt Hinkley, Wallace Wolodarsky	Jason Priestley, Peter Riegert, Kimberly Williams	United States	Comedy thriller
Copycat	Jon Amiel	Sigourney Weaver, Holly Hunter, Dermot Mulroney, William McNamara, Harry Connick Jr.	United States	
Cover Me	Michael Schroeder	Rick Rossovich, Paul Sorvino, Courtney Taylor	United States	
Crimson Tide	Tony Scott	Denzel Washington, Gene Hackman, George Dzundza, James Gandolfini, Viggo Mortensen, Matt Craven	United States	Action thriller
Crying Freeman	Christophe Gans	Mark Dacascos, Julie Condra, Tchéky Karyo	France; Canada	Action thriller
Desperado	Robert Rodriguez	Antonio Banderas, Salma Hayek, Joaquim de Almeida	United States	Action thriller
Die Hard with a Vengeance	John McTiernan	Bruce Willis, Jeremy Irons, Samuel L. Jackson	United States	Action thriller
Dolores Claiborne	Taylor Hackford	Kathy Bates, Jennifer Jason Leigh, Christopher Plummer, David Strathairn, Judy Parfitt, John C. Reilly, Eric Bogosian	United States	
Fair Game	Andrew Sipes	William Baldwin, Cindy Crawford	United States	Action thriller
GoldenEye	Martin Campbell	Pierce Brosnan, Sean Bean, Izabella Scorupco, Famke Janssen, Judi Dench	United States; United Kingdom	Action thriller
Gonin	Takashi Ishii	Naoto Takenaka	Japan	
Heat	Michael Mann	Al Pacino, Robert De Niro, Val Kilmer	United States	
Jade	William Friedkin	David Caruso, Linda Fiorentino, Chazz Palminteri, Michael Biehn, Richard Crenna	United States	
Just Cause	Arnold Glimcher	Sean Connery, Laurence Fishburne, Kate Capshaw, Blair Underwood	United States	
Kamikaze Taxi	Masato Harada	Takeshi Caesar, Chika Nakagami, Mickey Curtis	Japan	Crime thriller, action thriller
Kiss of Death	Barbet Schroeder	David Caruso, Samuel L. Jackson, Nicolas Cage, Kathryn Erbe, Helen Hunt, Michael Rapaport, Ving Rhames, Stanley Tucci	United States	
Never Talk to Strangers	Peter Hall	Rebecca De Mornay, Antonio Banderas, Dennis Miller, Len Cariou, Harry Dean Stanton	United States	
The Net	Irwin Winkler	Sandra Bullock, Jeremy Northam, Dennis Miller	United States	
Nick of Time	John Badham	Johnny Depp, Christopher Walken, Charles S. Dutton, Roma Maffia, Gloria Reuben, Peter Strauss, Marsha Mason	United States	
Nixon	Oliver Stone	Anthony Hopkins, Joan Allen, Annabeth Gish, Powers Boothe, J.T. Walsh, E.G. Marshall, James Woods, Paul Sorvino, Bob Hoskins, Larry Hagman, David Hyde Pierce	United States	Political thriller
Nobody Will Speak of Us When We're Dead	Eduardo Diaz Yanes	Victoria Abril, Angel Alcázar, Marta Aura	Spain	
Outbreak	Wolfgang Petersen	Dustin Hoffman, Rene Russo, Morgan Freeman, Donald Sutherland, Cuba Gooding Jr., Kevin Spacey, Patrick Dempsey	United States	
Poison Ivy II: Lily	Anne Goursaud	Alyssa Milano, Johnathon Schaech, Camilla Belle	United States	
Screamers	Christian Duguay	Ron White, Peter Weller, Jennifer Rubin	United States; Canada	
Se7en	David Fincher	Brad Pitt, Morgan Freeman, Gwyneth Paltrow, Kevin Spacey	United States	
Sudden Death	Peter Hyams	Jean-Claude Van Damme, Powers Boothe, Dorian Harewood	United States	Action thriller
Things to Do in Denver When You're Dead	Gary Fleder	Andy Garcia, Christopher Lloyd, William Forsythe, Bill Nunn, Treat Williams, Jack Warden, Steve Buscemi, Fairuza Balk, Gabrielle Anwar, Christopher Walken, Bill Cobbs, Marshall Bell, Glenn Plummer, Don Stark, Willie Garson, Jenny McCarthy, Sarah Trigger, Don Cheadle, Tiny Lister	United States	
Under Siege 2: Dark Territory	Geoff Murphy	Steven Seagal, Eric Bogosian, Katherine Heigl, Morris Chestnut, Everett McGill	United States	Action thriller
The Usual Suspects	Bryan Singer	Gabriel Byrne, Stephen Baldwin, Chazz Palminteri, Kevin Spacey, Benicio del Toro, Kevin Pollak, Pete Postlethwaite	United States	
1996
Anna Oz	Eric Rochant	Charlotte Gainsbourg, Gérard Lanvin, Sami Bouajila	France; Italy; Switzerland	
Broken Arrow	John Woo	John Travolta, Christian Slater, Samantha Mathis, Delroy Lindo, Bob Gunton, Howie Long, Frank Whaley	United States	Action thriller
Bound	Andy Wachowski, Larry Wachowski	Jennifer Tilly, Gina Gershon, Joe Pantoliano	United States	Erotic thriller
Chain Reaction	Andrew Davis	Keanu Reeves, Morgan Freeman, Rachel Weisz, Fred Ward, Brian Cox, Kevin Dunn	United States	Action thriller
Crimetime	George Sluizer	Stephen Baldwin, Pete Postlethwaite, Sadie Frost	United States	
Diabolique	Jeremiah S. Chechik	Sharon Stone, Isabelle Adjani, Chazz Palminteri, Kathy Bates	United States	
Eraser	Chuck Russell	Arnold Schwarzenegger, James Caan, Vanessa L. Williams, Robert Pastorelli, James Coburn	United States	Action thriller
Extreme Measures	Michael Apted	Hugh Grant, Gene Hackman, Sarah Jessica Parker	United States	
Eye for an Eye	John Schlesinger	Sally Field, Kiefer Sutherland, Ed Harris, Joe Mantegna, Beverly D'Angelo	United States	
The Fan	Tony Scott	Robert De Niro, Wesley Snipes, Ellen Barkin, John Leguizamo, Benicio Del Toro	United States	
Fear	James Foley	Mark Wahlberg, Reese Witherspoon, Alyssa Milano, William Petersen, Amy Brenneman	United States	
Freeway	Matthew Bright	Reese Witherspoon, Kiefer Sutherland, Brooke Shields	United States	Crime thriller
Fled	Kevin Hooks	Laurence Fishburne, Stephen Baldwin, Will Patton, Robert John Burke, Salma Hayek	United States	Action thriller
The Glimmer Man	John Gray	Steven Seagal, Keenen Ivory Wayans, Bob Gunton	United States	Action thriller
Head Above Water	Jim Wilson	Harvey Keitel, Cameron Diaz, Craig Sheffer, Billy Zane	United States; United Kingdom	
The Hunters	Kjell Sundvall	Helena Bergström, Rolf Degerlund, Goran Forsmark	Sweden	
The Juror	Brian Gibson	Demi Moore, Alec Baldwin, Joseph Gordon-Levitt, James Gandolfini, Anne Heche	United States	
Last Man Standing	Walter Hill	Bruce Willis, Christopher Walken, Bruce Dern	United States	Action thriller
The Long Kiss Goodnight	Renny Harlin	Geena Davis, Samuel L. Jackson, Patrick Malahide, Craig Bierko, Brian Cox	United States	Action thriller
Maximum Risk	Ringo Lam	Jean-Claude Van Damme, Natasha Henstridge, Zach Grenier	United States	Action thriller
Mission: Impossible	Brian De Palma	Tom Cruise, Jon Voight, Ving Rhames, Jean Reno, Emmanuelle Beart, Kristin Scott Thomas, Vanessa Redgrave	United States	Action thriller
Passage a L'Acte	Francis Girod	Daniel Auteuil, Patrick Timsit, Anne Parillaud	France	
Primal Fear	Gregory Hoblit	Richard Gere, Laura Linney, Edward Norton, Alfre Woodard, John Mahoney, Frances McDormand	United States	
Pusher	Nicolas Winding Refn	Peter Andersson, Vanja Bajicic, Kim Bodnia	Denmark	Crime thriller
Ransom	Ron Howard	Mel Gibson, Rene Russo, Gary Sinise, Delroy Lindo, Brawley Nolte	United States	Crime thriller
The Rock	Michael Bay	Sean Connery, Nicolas Cage, Ed Harris, Michael Biehn, William Forsythe	United States	Action thriller
Sa Aking Mga Kamay	Rory B. Quintos	Christopher de Leon, Chin Chin Gutierrez, Aga Muhlach	Philippines	Thriller drama
Sci-Fighters	Peter Svatek	Roddy Piper, Jayne Heitmeyer, Billy Drago	United States	Action thriller
The Stendhal Syndrome	Dario Argento	Asia Argento, Paolo Bonacelli, Luigi Diberti	Italy	
Tesis	Alejandro Amenábar	Xavier Elorriaga, Fele Martínez, Eduardo Noriega	Spain	
The Trigger Effect	David Koepp	Kyle MacLachlan, Elisabeth Shue, Dermot Mulroney, Richard T. Jones, Bill Smitrovich, Philip Bruns, Michael Rooker, Jack Noseworthy, Richard Schiff	United States	
Unforgettable	John Dahl	Ray Liotta, Linda Fiorentino, Peter Coyote, Christopher McDonald	United States	
Young and Dangerous	Andrew Lau	Chan Sau-yu, Jordan Chan	Hong Kong	Action thriller
1997
Absolute Power	Clint Eastwood	Clint Eastwood, Gene Hackman, Ed Harris, Laura Linney, Judy Davis, Dennis Haysbert, E.G. Marshall	United States	
Air Force One	Wolfgang Petersen	Harrison Ford, Gary Oldman, Wendy Crewson, Glenn Close	United States	Action thriller
Bad Day on the Block	Craig R. Baxley	Charlie Sheen, Mare Winningham	United States	
Barracuda	Philippe Haïm	Jean Rochefort, Guillaume Canet, Claire Kem	France; Germany; Belgium	
Breakdown	Jonathan Mostow	Kurt Russell, J. T. Walsh, Kathleen Quinlan, M. C. Gainey	United States	
Conspiracy Theory	Richard Donner	Mel Gibson, Julia Roberts, Patrick Stewart	United States	
Le Cousin	Alain Corneau	Alain Chabat, Patrick Timsit, Samuel Le Bihan	France	Crime thriller
Cure	Kiyoshi Kurosawa	Kōji Yakusho, Tsuyoshi Ujiki	Japan	
Dobermann	Jan Kounen	Vincent Cassel, Monica Bellucci, Tchéky Karyo	France	Crime thriller
Face/Off	John Woo	Nicolas Cage, John Travolta, Joan Allen, Gina Gershon, Alessandro Nivola, Dominique Swain	United States	Action thriller
Fred	Pierre Jolivet	Clotilde Courau, François Berléand, Vincent Lindon	France	Psychological thriller
Funny Games	Michael Haneke	Susanne Lothar, Ulrich Mühe, Arno Frisch	Austria	
The Game	David Fincher	Michael Douglas, Sean Penn, Deborah Kara Unger, James Rebhorn	United States	
Genealogies of a Crime	Raúl Ruiz	Catherine Deneuve, Michel Piccoli, Melvil Poupaud	France	Psychological thriller, crime thriller
Insomnia	Erik Skjoldbjærg	Stellan Skarsgård, Gisken Armand	Norway	
The Jackal	Michael Caton-Jones	Bruce Willis, Richard Gere, Sidney Poitier, Diane Venora	United States	
Jackie Brown	Quentin Tarantino	Pam Grier, Samuel L. Jackson, Robert Forster, Bridget Fonda, Michael Keaton, Robert De Niro	United States	Crime thriller
Kiss the Girls	Gary Fleder	Morgan Freeman, Ashley Judd, Cary Elwes, Tony Goldwyn, Jay O. Sanders	United States	
Murder at 1600	Dwight H. Little	Wesley Snipes, Diane Lane, Alan Alda, Dennis Miller, Daniel Benzali	United States	
Nightwatch	Ole Bornedal	Ewan McGregor, Patricia Arquette, Josh Brolin, Nick Nolte	United States	Crime thriller, psychological thriller
Open Your Eyes	Alejandro Amenábar	Eduardo Noriega, Penélope Cruz, Chete Lera	Spain; Italy; France	
The Peacemaker	Mimi Leder	George Clooney, Nicole Kidman, Marcel Iures	United States	
Perfect Blue	Satoshi Kon		Japan	
Poison Ivy: The New Seduction	Kurt Voss	Jaime Pressly, Michael Des Barres, Megan Edwards	United States	
See the Sea	François Ozon	Sasha Hails, Marina de Van, Samantha	France	
Shadow Conspiracy	George Pan Cosmatos	Charlie Sheen, Donald Sutherland, Linda Hamilton, Sam Waterston, Stephen Lang, Ben Gazzara, Theodore Bikel	United States	
Smilla's Sense of Snow	Bille August	Julia Ormond, Gabriel Byrne, Richard Harris, Robert Loggia, Vanessa Redgrave	Denmark; Germany; Sweden	
Suicide Kings	Peter O'Fallon	Christopher Walken, Denis Leary, Henry Thomas	United States	
The Swindle	Claude Chabrol	Isabelle Huppert, Michel Serrault, François Cluzet	France; Switzerland	
1998
A (Kannada movie)	Upendra	Upendra, Chandini	India	Psychological thriller
Apt Pupil	Bryan Singer	Ian McKellen, Brad Renfro, Bruce Davison, David Schwimmer	United States	Psychological thriller
Bullet Ballet	Shinya Tsukamoto	Shinya Tsukamoto, Kirina Mano, Tatsuya Nakamura	Japan	
Clay Pigeons	David Dobkin	Joaquin Phoenix, Vince Vaughn, Janeane Garofalo, Georgina Cates, Gregory Sporleder, Phil Morris, Scott Wilson, Vince Vieluf, Nikki Arlyn, Joseph D. Reitman	United States	Comedy thriller
The Curve	Dan Rosen	Matthew Lillard, Michael Vartan, Randall Batinkoff	United States	
Déjà mort	Olivier Dahan	Romain Duris, Benoît Magimel, Zoe Felix	France	
Desperate Measures	Barbet Schroeder	Michael Keaton, Andy García, Brian Cox, Marcia Gay Harden	United States	
Devil in the Flesh	Steve Cohen	Rose McGowan, Alex McArthur, Sherrie Rose	United States	
Disturbing Behavior	David Nutter	James Marsden, Katie Holmes, Nick Stahl	United States	
Enemy of the State	Tony Scott	Will Smith, Gene Hackman, Jon Voight	United States	
Fallen	Gregory Hoblit	Denzel Washington, John Goodman, Donald Sutherland, Embeth Davidtz, James Gandolfini, Elias Koteas	United States	
Following	Christopher Nolan	Jeremy Theobald, Alex Haw, Lucy Russell	United Kingdom	
The Gingerbread Man	Robert Altman	Kenneth Branagh, Embeth Davidtz, Robert Downey Jr., Daryl Hannah, Tom Berenger, Robert Duvall	United States	
Hard Rain	Mikael Salomon	Morgan Freeman, Christian Slater, Randy Quaid, Minnie Driver	United States	Action thriller
Heaven	Scott Reynolds	Martin Donovan, Danny Edwards, Richard Schiff	New Zealand	
Hush	Jonathan Darby	Jessica Lange, Gwyneth Paltrow, Johnathon Schaech	United States	
The Interview	Craig Monahan	Hugo Weaving, Tony Martin, Aaron Jeffery	Australia	
The Longest Nite	Yau Tat-chi	Yau Tat-chi, Tony Leung Chiu-Wai, Maggie Shiu	Hong Kong	Crime thriller
Mercury Rising	Harold Becker	Bruce Willis, Alec Baldwin, Miko Hughes, Chi McBride, Kim Dickens	United States	Crime thriller, action thriller
A Murder of Crows	Rowdy Herrington	Cuba Gooding Jr., Tom Berenger, Eric Stoltz	United States	
New Rose Hotel	Abel Ferrara	Christopher Walken, Willem Dafoe, Asia Argento	United States	
The Negotiator	F. Gary Gray	Samuel L. Jackson, Kevin Spacey, David Morse	United States	
Palmetto	Volker Schlöndorff	Woody Harrelson, Elisabeth Shue, Gina Gershon, Chloë Sevigny, Michael Rapaport	United States; Germany	
A Perfect Murder	Andrew Davis	Michael Douglas, Gwyneth Paltrow, Viggo Mortensen	United States	
Pi	Darren Aronofsky	Sean Gullette, Mark Margolis, Ben Shenkman	United States	
Psycho	Gus Van Sant	Vince Vaughn, Anne Heche, Julianne Moore, Viggo Mortensen, William H. Macy	United States	
The Replacement Killers	Antoine Fuqua	Chow Yun-fat, Mira Sorvino, Michael Rooker, Jurgen Prochnow	United States	Action thriller
Ring	Hideo Nakata	Nanako Matsushima, Hiroyuki Sanada, Miki Nakatani	Japan	Psychological thriller
Ronin	John Frankenheimer	Robert De Niro, Jean Reno, Natascha McElhone, Stellan Skarsgard, Sean Bean, Jonathan Pryce	United States	Action thriller
Run Lola Run	Tom Tykwer	Franka Potente, Moritz Bleibtreu	Germany	
The Siege	Edward Zwick	Denzel Washington, Annette Bening, Bruce Willis, Tony Shalhoub, David Proval	United States	Action thriller, political thriller
Snake Eyes	Brian De Palma	Nicolas Cage, Gary Sinise, Carla Gugino, John Heard, Kevin Dunn, Stan Shaw	United States	
U.S. Marshals	Stuart Baird	Tommy Lee Jones, Wesley Snipes, Robert Downey Jr., Joe Pantoliano, Kate Nelligan, Irene Jacob	United States	Action thriller
Wicked	Michael Steinberg	Julia Stiles, William R. Moses, Patrick Muldoon	United States	
Wild Things	John McNaughton	Kevin Bacon, Matt Dillon, Neve Campbell, Denise Richards, Bill Murray	United States	
The Wisdom of Crocodiles	Po-Chih Leong	Jude Law, Elina Löwensohn	United Kingdom	
1999
8mm	Joel Schumacher	Nicolas Cage, Joaquin Phoenix, James Gandolfini, Catherine Keener	United States	
Apocalypse II: Revelation	Andre Van Heerden	Jeff Fahey, Nick Mancuso, Carol Alt	United States; Canada	
Arlington Road	Mark Pellington	Jeff Bridges, Tim Robbins, Joan Cusack, Hope Davis	United States	
The Astronaut's Wife	Rand Ravich	Johnny Depp, Charlize Theron, Joe Morton	United States	Psychological thriller
Best Laid Plans	Mike Barker	Reese Witherspoon, Alessandro Nivola, Josh Brolin	United States	Crime thriller
The Bone Collector	Phillip Noyce	Denzel Washington, Angelina Jolie, Queen Latifah, Michael Rooker, Ed O'Neill	United States	Crime thriller, action thriller
Buddy Boy	Mark Hanlon	Aidan Gillen, Emmanuelle Seigner	United States	
The Boondock Saints	Troy Duffy	Willem Dafoe, Sean Patrick Flanery, Norman Reedus	United States	Action thriller
Bullet	Cesar Montano	Cesar Montano, Sunshine Cruz, Jay Manalo	Philippines	Action thriller
The Corruptor	James Foley	Chow Yun-fat, Mark Wahlberg, Ric Young	United States	
Deep Blue Sea	Renny Harlin	Thomas Jane, Saffron Burrows, Samuel L. Jackson, Stellan Skarsgård, LL Cool J, Michael Rapaport, Jacqueline McKenzie	United States; Australia	
Double Jeopardy	Bruce Beresford	Tommy Lee Jones, Ashley Judd, Bruce Greenwood	United States	
Entrapment	Jon Amiel	Sean Connery, Catherine Zeta-Jones, Ving Rhames	United States	Crime thriller
Eye of the Beholder	Stephan Elliott	Ewan McGregor, Ashley Judd, Patrick Bergin, Jason Priestley, k.d. lang, Genevieve Bujold	Australia; United Kingdom; Canada	
Eyes Wide Shut	Stanley Kubrick	Tom Cruise, Nicole Kidman, Sydney Pollack, Todd Field	United Kingdom; United States	Paranoid thriller
Fever	Alex Winter	Henry Thomas, David Patrick O'Hara, Bill Duke	United Kingdom; United States	
Felicia's Journey	Atom Egoyan	Bob Hoskins, Elaine Cassidy, Arsinée Khanjian	United Kingdom; Canada	
The General's Daughter	Simon West	John Travolta, Madeleine Stowe, James Woods, Timothy Hutton, James Cromwell	United States	
Goodbye Lover	Roland Joffé	Patricia Arquette, Dermot Mulroney, Ellen DeGeneres, Mary-Louise Parker, Don Johnson	United States	Comedy thriller
In Dreams	Neil Jordan	Annette Bening, Aidan Quinn, Stephen Rea, Robert Downey Jr.	United States	
In Too Deep	Michael Rymer	Omar Epps, LL Cool J, Nia Long	United States	
The Nameless	Jaume Balagueró	Emma Vilarasau, Karra Elejalde, Tristán Ulloa	Spain	
The Ninth Gate	Roman Polanski	Johnny Depp, Frank Langella, Lena Olin, Emmanuelle Seigner	France; Spain	
The Omega Code	Robert Marcarelli	Casper Van Dien, Michael York, Michael Ironside, Catherine Oxenberg	United States	
Payback	Brian Helgeland	Mel Gibson, Gregg Henry, Maria Bello, David Paymer, Deborah Kara Unger, William Devane, John Glover, Lucy Liu, Bill Duke, James Coburn, Kris Kristofferson	United States	Crime thriller, action thriller
Purple Storm	Teddy Chan	Daniel Wu, Kwok-Leung Gan, Emil Chau	Hong Kong	Crime thriller, action thriller
Resurrection	Russell Mulcahy	Christopher Lambert, James Kidnie, Mike Anscombe	United States	Crime thriller
Ruang Talok 69	Pen-ek Ratanaruang	Lalita Panyopas, Black Pomtong	Thailand	
Running Out of Time	Johnnie To	Andy Lau, Lau Ching-Wan, Yo Yo Mung	Hong Kong	
Shiri	Jacky Kang	Han Suk-kyu, Choi Min-sik, Song Kang-ho	South Korea	
The Sixth Sense	M. Night Shyamalan	Bruce Willis, Haley Joel Osment, Toni Collette, Olivia Williams, Donnie Wahlberg	United States	
Sleepy Hollow	Tim Burton	Johnny Depp, Christina Ricci, Christopher Walken, Casper Van Dien, Miranda Richardson, Christopher Lee, Jeffrey Jones, Michael Gough	United States	Horror, supernatural thriller
Stigmata	Rupert Wainwright	Patricia Arquette, Gabriel Byrne, Jonathan Pryce, Nia Long, Rade Serbedzija	United States	Psychological thriller
Stir of Echoes	David Koepp	Kevin Bacon, Kathryn Erbe, Illeana Douglas, Kevin Dunn	United States	Supernatural thriller, psychological thriller
The Talented Mr. Ripley	Anthony Minghella	Matt Damon, Gwyneth Paltrow, Jude Law, Cate Blanchett	United States	
Teaching Mrs. Tingle	Kevin Williamson	Helen Mirren, Katie Holmes, Barry Watson, Marisa Coughlan, Jeffrey Tambor	United States	
