= Zarkorr! The Invader =

- DVD artwork
- Directed by: Aaron Osborne (Note: Michael Deak and Aaron Osborne co-directed Zarkorr! The Invader, but Osborne is listed as the sole director in the final movie.)
- Written by: Neal Marshall Stevens (Note: Credited under the pseudonym Benjamin Carr.)
- Produced by: Rob Martin; Steve Sechrest; Sally Clarke; Kirk Edward Hansen
- Starring: Rhys Pugh; De'Prise Grossman; Mark Hamilton; Charles Schneider; Eileen Wesson
- Cinematography: Joe C. Maxwell
- Edited by: Felix Chamberlain
- Music by: Richard Band
- Distributed by: Full Moon Entertainment
- Release date: April 1996
- Running time: 75 minutes
- Country: United States
- Language: English

Zarkorr! The Invader is a 1996 American monster film directed by Michael Deak and Aaron Osborne, with a screenplay by Neal Marshall Stevens. Produced by Full Moon Entertainment, it stars Rhys Pugh, De'Prise Grossman, Mark Hamilton, Charles Schneider, and Eileen Wesson. The story regards an extraterrestrial race who challenge mankind by unleashing a giant monster called Zarkorr upon Earth. To give humans a fighting chance, they select a hero to fight the monster: a young postal worker named Tommy Ward.

Released direct-to-video under Full Moon's Monster Island Entertainment division in April 1996, the film received negative reviews from critics but has gained a minor cult following in later years - especially for the titular monster.

== Plot ==
Intelligent aliens who have been studying Earth for centuries decide to challenge mankind by sending in a 185-foot, laser-eyed monster called Zarkorr to wreak city-crushing havoc. Only one incredibly average young man, postal worker Tommy Ward (Rhys Pugh), can find the beast's weakness and save the planet with the help of a 6-inch-tall pixie (Torie Lynch), who says she is "a mental image projected into his brain" by the aliens. She explains that Zarkorr cannot be destroyed by weapons, but that the key to the monster's destruction lies within the monster itself. Tommy, chosen as an average human, is the one destined to fight Zarkorr, who has been trained to kill him. Tommy asks scientist Dr. Stephanie Martin (De'Prise Grossman) for advice about his mission, but everyone thinks he is crazy. He takes the scientist hostage, but manages to explain his predicament to one of the policemen George Ray (Mark Hamilton), who believes him and helps him escape. Dr. Martin agrees to help him. Using computers belonging to a friend of hers, they establish that the monster, which is destroying city after city in the style of Godzilla, neither sleeps nor breathes. Going to the place where the monster first appeared, they come into possession of a strange metallic capsule that fell out of the sky at the time the monster arrived. It is believed to be unopenable, but it opens by itself for Tommy as he touches it. He uses the top of the capsule as a shield, reflecting Zarkorr's laser rays back at him, and the monster dissolves into a small glowing sphere flying into space. Tommy is taken to a hospital to recover; a TV reporter congratulates him for saving the world, and he jokes he might run for president.

== Cast ==
- Rhys Pugh as Tommy Ward
- De'Prise Grossman as Dr. Stephanie Martin
- Mark Hamilton as George Ray
- Charles Schneider as Arthur
- Torie Lynch as Proctor
- Franklin A. Vallette as Horrace
- Don Yanan as Dunk
- Peter Looney as Billy
- Dyer McHenry as Al
- Stan Chambers as Stan
- Elizabeth Anderson as Herself
- Robert Craighead as Marty Karlson
- Eileen Wesson as Debby Dalverson
- Mary Ostow as Reporter
- Jim Glassman as Stage Manager
- Emmett Grennan as Crew Member
- Mike Terner as Guard One
- Robert J. Ferrelli as Guard Two
- Ron Barnes as Larry Bates
- John Paul Fedele as Zarkorr

== Release ==
Zarkorr! The Invader was released direct to video on VHS in 1996. The film was released on DVD in 2004.

== Reception ==
=== Critical response ===
Zarkorr! The Invader received negative reviews from critics. Review aggregator Rotten Tomatoes reports that 13% of critics have given the film a positive review based out of 1 review, with an average rating of 1.3/5.
