= Gale Tattersall =

British cinematographer (born 1948)

- Born: 1948 (age 77–78); England
- Years active: 1969–2022
- Spouse(s): Teresa Tattersall (divorced)
- Children: 2

Gale Tattersall (born 1948) is an English cinematographer.

== Early life ==
Tattersall divided his childhood and education between Liverpool and the Indian city of Darjeeling, where he attended a boarding school due to his father's role an engineer at a steel company in Mumbai.

At the age of 16, he left home in Liverpool and moved to London, where he started working as a photographer at the [[]].

A visit by American architect Buckminster Fuller in 1967 inspired him to pick up a Bolex camera to document the visit, and he became so enchanted by the filmmaking process that he enrolled at the London Film School for a two-year course.

== Career ==
Upon graduation, Tattersall received a grant from the British Film Institute to make a short film called Value For Money, inspired by a dream and featuring a pre-fame Quentin Crisp.

He has since been the cinematographer on films such as The Commitments and Tank Girl, as well as 120 episodes of the medical drama series House.

He was nominated for the Primetime Emmy Award for Outstanding Cinematography for a Miniseries or a Movie for his work on Ron Howard's 1998 docudrama miniseries From the Earth to the Moon.

He was twice nominated for the American Society of Cinematographers Award for Outstanding Achievement in Cinematography in Regular Series for the House episodes "House's Head" and "Meaning". He is the founder of the HDD SLR Workshops in Santa Monica, California.

== Personal life ==
Tattersall has two sons, with his Brazilian ex-wife Thereza.

== Filmography ==
=== Film ===
Short film

Year	Title	Director	Notes
1970	Value for Money	David Blest	Also writer and producer
1980	Dark Water	Andrew Bogle	
1985	Wings of Death	Nichola Bruce; Michael Coulson	Lighting cameraman
1987	La Vergine Degli Angeli	Charles Sturridge	Segment of Aria
2015	Trick Shot	Evan Kaufmann	

Feature film

Year	Title	Director
1973	My Ain Folk	Bill Douglas
1986	Comrades	Bill Douglas
1988	Homeboy	Michael Seresin
1989	Wild Orchid (Note: Also credited as camera operator)	Zalman King
1990	Vroom	Beeban Kidron
1991	The Commitments	Alan Parker
1995	Hideaway	Brett Leonard
1995	Tank Girl	Rachel Talalay
1995	Virtuosity	Brett Leonard
1999	Pushing Tin	Mike Newell
2001	Thir13en Ghosts	Steve Beck
2002	Ghost Ship	Steve Beck
2014	Atlas Shrugged Part III	J. James Manera

Video short

Year	Title	Director	Notes
2006	The Art of the Impossible	Robert Murphree	
2006	How I Learned Faith	Robert Murphree	
2006	Lost at Sea	Robert Murphree	
2006	The Man Is the Message	Robert Murphree	
2006	The Matchless Message	Robert Murphree	
2006	The Power of Proclamation	Robert Murphree	
2006	Principles for Success	Robert Murphree	
2006	Relying on the Anointing	Robert Murphree	
2007	Full Flame Film Series	Robert Murphree	With Ben Mesker and Michael Murray

=== Television ===
TV movies

Year	Title	Director	Notes
1973	The Wreck of the Batavia	Bruce Beresford	Documentary film
1973	Monster or Miracle? Sydney Opera House	Bruce Beresford	Documentary film
1999	The Jack Bull	John Badham	
2013	Call Me Crazy: A Five Film	Laura Dern; Sharon Maguire	Segments "Grace" and "Allison"

TV series

Year	Title	Director	Notes
1998	From the Earth to the Moon	David Frankel; David Carson; Sally Field; Gary Fleder; Tom Hanks; Frank Marshall; Jonathan Mostow; Jon Turteltaub; Graham Yost	Miniseries
2000	CSI: Crime Scene Investigation	Danny Cannon	Episode "Pilot"
2006–2012	House		120 episodes
2015–2022	Grace and Frankie		80 episodes

== Accolades ==
Primetime Emmy Awards

Year	Category	Title	Result	Episode	Ref.
1998	Outstanding Cinematography	From the Earth to the Moon	Nominated	"Can We Do This?"	

American Society of Cinematographers

Year	Category	Title	Result	Episode	Ref.
2007	Outstanding Achievement in Cinematography	House	Nominated	"House's Head"	
2009	Outstanding Achievement in Cinematography	House	Nominated	"Meaning"	
