= RPM (film) =

1998 film by Ian Sharp

- Directed by: Ian Sharp
- Written by: Donald Cammell; Roger Avary; J.P. Gardner
- Produced by: Thomas Hedman
- Starring: David Arquette; Emmanuelle Seigner; Famke Janssen
- Cinematography: Harvey Harrison
- Edited by: Peter Davies
- Music by: Alan Lisk
- Production companies: Europa Pictures Limited; IFR Corporation NV; Screen Partners Ltd.
- Distributed by: Paramount Home Entertainment
- Release date: June 23, 1998
- Running time: 91 minutes
- Countries: United Kingdom; United States
- Language: English

RPM (also known as R.P.M.) is a 1998 action film starring David Arquette, Emmanuelle Seigner, and Famke Janssen. It was shot in 1997 and first released on video in Germany on June 23, 1998. and in the United States and Canada on September 19, 2000.

== Plot ==
Luke Delson (David Arquette) is a professional carjacker who is currently residing in Los Angeles. After a call, he decides to go to Nice, to track a car for an oil oligarch, Constantine Charkos. The car, named RPM, can apparently drive without any kind of power source. Charkos, afraid that the mass production of the car would destroy his oil empire, offers him 1 billion dollars to steal it. But with the police detective on his tail, Biggerman, the man who built RPM, and also his sister Claudia (Famke Janssen), who wants the money, on his tail, he will find it very difficult to steal the car. Along the way, he meets Charkos' girl (Emmanuelle Seigner), who wants her car back (which Luke has stolen, but Claudia took it). She helps him steal the RPM in exchange for bringing her car back and the two eventually start a romance.

== Cast ==
- David Arquette as Luke Delson
- Emmanuelle Seigner as Michelle Claire
- Famke Janssen as Claudia Haggs
- Steve John Shepherd as Rudy
- Stephen Yardley as Chiarkos
- Kenneth Cranham as Biggerman
- John Bluthal as Grinkstein
- Jean-Luc Bideau as Inspector LeBlanc
- Debora Weston as Georgie
- George Rossi as Zantos
- Bob Sherman as Karl Delson
- Jonathan Cecil as Lord Baxter
- Patrick Allen as Millionaire
- Jerry Hall as Bored Girlfriend
- Stephane Eichenholc as Undercover Cop
- Jeff Harding as Tim Ryan
- Sheri Graubert as Karen
- James Larkin as Jonqull
- John Clive as Bentley Man

== Production ==
The film was mostly shot in the forests of France and in the Nice. The production ended in the summer of 1997. The film was recognized for many famous cars in the movie.
