= Ghost Ship (2002 film) =

2002 film by Steve Beck

- Theatrical release poster
- Directed by: Steve Beck
- Screenplay by: Mark Hanlon; John Pogue
- Story by: Mark Hanlon
- Produced by: Joel Silver; Robert Zemeckis; Gilbert Adler
- Starring: Julianna Margulies; Ron Eldard; Desmond Harrington; Isaiah Washington; Gabriel Byrne
- Cinematography: Gale Tattersall
- Edited by: Roger Barton
- Music by: John Frizzell
- Production companies: Warner Bros. Pictures; Village Roadshow Pictures; Dark Castle Entertainment; NPV Entertainment; Ghost Ship Films Pty. Ltd.
- Distributed by: Warner Bros. Pictures (Overseas); Roadshow Entertainment (Australia)
- Release date: October 25, 2002
- Running time: 91 minutes
- Countries: United States; Australia
- Language: English
- Budget: $20 million
- Box office: $68.3 million

Ghost Ship is a 2002 supernatural horror film directed by Steve Beck from a screenplay by Mark Hanlon and John Pogue. Its plot follows a marine salvage crew in the Bering Sea who discover a mysterious ocean liner that disappeared in 1962 and stars an ensemble cast of Gabriel Byrne, Julianna Margulies, Ron Eldard, Desmond Harrington, Isaiah Washington, Alex Dimitriades, and Karl Urban.

Shot in Australia and Canada, It was released theatrically in North America by Warner Bros. Pictures on October 25, 2002, with Roadshow Entertainment releasing in Australia. It received generally negative reviews but was a commercial success, grossing $68.3 million worldwide on a $20 million budget.

== Plot ==
On May 21, 1962, off the Labrador Coast, passengers aboard the Italian ocean liner MS Antonia Graza dance as a lounge singer named Francesca performs the song "Senza fine". A little girl named Katie Harwood sits alone until the ship's captain offers to dance with her. An unidentified passenger lifts a lever to tighten a metal cable which then snaps and rips through the stage and dance floor, bisecting everyone except Katie, who screams in horror.

Forty years later, a salvage crew—Captain Sean Murphy, Maureen Epps, Greer, Dodge, Munder, and Santos—are approached by weather service pilot Jack Ferriman, who spotted a vessel adrift in the Bering Strait. It can be claimed by whoever brings it to port. They set out on their salvage tug, Arctic Warrior, and discover that the ship is Antonia Graza. They find nine wooden boxes on the abandoned ship, each containing 28 gold bars. After a series of supernatural events and with the knowledge that the ship is sinking, the salvagers decide to leave with the gold. An invisible force sabotages Arctic Warrior with a gas leak and causes it to explode, killing Santos.

The salvagers realize that their only means of escape is repairing Antonia Graza and returning to port. Greer encounters the ghost of Francesca, who seduces him into cheating on his fiancée and then tricks him into falling to his death down an elevator shaft. Sean enters the captain's cabin and encounters the ghost of the captain, who explains that the crew of Antonia Graza had also recovered gold from a sinking cruise ship, Lorelei, along with a sole survivor. Sean is shown a picture of the survivor, whom he recognizes. He rushes to tell the others but a hallucination makes him see Maureen as the ghost of Santos, who provokes him into a fit of rage. The others think Sean has gone mad and lock him in the drained fish tank, where Maureen later finds him drowned after an invisible force opened a valve, filling the tank with water.

Maureen meets the ghost of Katie, who reveals what happened on Antonia Graza. The sole survivor of Lorelei convinced Antonia Graza crew members to murder their passengers, as well as the captain and officers, for the gold. After murdering the passengers, they turned on each other, and Francesca killed the officer who survived. The mastermind behind the massacre killed Francesca by releasing a hook that slashed her neck. He is revealed to be Jack, who is actually the demonic spirit of a deceased sinner tasked with provoking people to sin before killing them and bringing their souls to Hell. Maureen deduces that Jack lured the salvage team to Antonia Graza to repair her and decides to sink her to thwart his plan. Munder is crushed to death under the ship's gears while scuba diving in the flooded engine room. Maureen tells Dodge to keep Jack on the ship's bridge while she sets explosives.

Jack taunts Dodge, calling him a "cowardly child" for never acting on his feelings for Maureen, then charges at him. Dodge shoots him with a shotgun and believes him to be dead. Maureen is setting explosives when Dodge appears. He claims that he shot Jack dead and that they can salvage the gold to start a life together, but Maureen wants to know why he has not asked where Munder is. Dodge morphs into Jack, who has already killed the real Dodge. Jack plans to use Antonia Graza as a trap to continue collecting souls. As long as Antonia Graza is kept afloat, the souls of everyone who died aboard the ship will be dragged down when Jack returns to Hell. Maureen detonates the explosives and Jack is blown to pieces, while Katie helps Maureen escape the sinking ship. Katie and the other trapped souls ascend to the afterlife.

Maureen is later found by a cruise ship and returned to land. As she is put into an ambulance, Maureen sees gold being loaded onto the cruise ship, overseen by a resurrected Jack.

== Cast ==
- Julianna Margulies as Maureen Epps
- Gabriel Byrne as Captain Sean Murphy
- Ron Eldard as Greg Dodge
- Desmond Harrington as Jack Ferriman
- Isaiah Washington as Philip Greer
- Alex Dimitriades as Diego Santos
- Karl Urban as Daryl Munder
- Emily Browning as Katie Harwood
- Francesca Rettondini as Francesca
  - Monica Mancini as the singing voice of Francesca
- Boris Brkic as Chief Steward
- Bob Ruggiero as Captain Ruggiero
- Iain Gardiner as Purser

== Production ==
=== Writing ===
Ghost Ship first emerged in January 1996 as Chimera, a spec script by Mark Hanlon. This script was a relatively bloodless psychological thriller rather than a vivid supernatural horror film. Most notably, much of the film's gore is absent from the screenplay. The film would have focused on four members of a salvage crew who end up stranded aboard the ghost vessel they are scuttling (the titular Chimera). Over the course of one night, each member — due to panic, cabin fever, or supernatural forces — goes insane and plots to kill the other three.

In Chimera, Murphy is the "main killer" and the ship runs onto some rocks and begins to sink. Murphy and Epps survive until nearly the end but as the ship sinks, Murphy goes off to retrieve gold ingots. The weight of the gold and the time he loses in getting to it leads to Murphy's demise. As in the film, Katie helps Epps escape. Over time, the script underwent rewrites, and the psychological aspects of the script were all jettisoned in favor of making the film a slasher. It has been suggested that "The cast signed on based on this (original) draft ... and were sadly disappointed to find the script had been radically changed by Joel Silver and associates when they arrived to begin shooting." According to Beck in the newly released director's commentary, the September 11 attacks in the United States inspired the studio to make the film a more definitive fight between good and evil instead of trying to be nuanced about the corruption of man.

=== Scale modeling ===
The idea of filming on a real ship was continually brought up, and a few ships were scouted for the possibility of being used as the Antonia Graza. "The temptation was always to shoot on the real thing," Beck says. "We actually visited a few [ships], but every time we thought, 'How are we ever going to get a dolly through this alley? Or down this hallway?' When you're shooting you often have to punch through a wall in order to get the shot you need, and on a steel ship that's impossible. We knew the real thing would be far too limiting."

Instead of using an actual ship, Australian visual effects company Photon VFX, who had earlier worked on the 2002 film Scooby-Doo, was hired as the principal contractor for all visual effects. This allowed Warner Bros. to take full advantage of the wide spectrum of services offered including CGI, animation, miniatures, live-action, prosthetics, pyrotechnics and aerial, underwater and motion control cinematography.

The SS Andrea Doria served as the inspiration for the film's ship the Antonia Graza. Photon created a 35-foot 1/20th scale model of the ship, allowing the exterior shots to be a combination of CGI, miniature, and live-action footage. For certain exterior shots, when a miniature would not work, a full-scale forecastle and bow were constructed. "It was a full-scale replica, so it wouldn't have fit into a studio," Walker explains. "It also needed to have sky backgrounds surrounding it, so we built it on a hill to achieve the desired effect."

=== Filming ===
Principal photography for Ghost Ship began in January 2002 on location in Queensland, Australia.

The majority of the film was shot on sets built on a sound stage at Village Roadshow Studios. The only ship used in Ghost Ship was the tugboat Arctic Warrior used by the main protagonists. While filming the exterior shots on the tugboat, a feeding frenzy occurred in the water, bringing 800–1,000 sharks within 50 yards of the production and its stars.

In February 2002, the 35-foot-long model of the Antonia Graza, made by Photon VFX, was taken out to Moreton Bay to film establishing shots of the ship adrift. In early February, construction of the bow and foredeck of the full-scale replica of the Antonia Graza was getting underway at Newstead, Queensland. Construction, which lasted roughly six weeks, drew many curious residents and tourists that were hoping to get a look at the nearly 100-foot-tall (30m) massive hull that dominated the surrounding area.

The film was also shot in Halifax, Nova Scotia and Vancouver.

=== Effects ===
Dale Duguid, the creative director of Photon VFX, wanted to push the boundaries. There was a lot of pride for Ghost Ship since it was the largest visual effect contract completely done in Australia to date. Photon VFX filmed a real ocean-liner at sea off the coast of New South Wales, digitally removed the ship, but kept all of its movements, leaving nothing but ocean and sky. Then the tracking data was taken and in-put into a robotic filming system, which then filmed the 35-foot-long (10 m) miniature ship. The digital effects team then added 300 digital extras, in addition to digital water and smoke to make the scene appear as realistic as possible.

The dramatic scene, which features the derelict ballroom reverting to its former grand self, posed a problem for the effects crew. "That was the most difficult shot I've ever worked on," says Duguid. Filming took place on two different sets, the first being the decrepit ballroom which had been adrift for forty years. The second set was the luxurious ballroom, used in the opening scene with happy party guests having a grand time. "We were filming on a derelict set and a new set, and we shot 80 layers of that scene on a circular motion control track, each time with different things going on. Some we shot forwards, some backwards, some fast, some slow."

== Soundtrack ==
Ghost Ship: Original Motion Picture Soundtrack

Soundtrack album by John Frizzell
- Released: November 5, 2002
- Recorded: 2002
- Length: 73:33
- Label: Varèse Sarabande

Professional ratings
Review scores
| Source | Rating |
|---|---|
| Filmtracks | 2.92/5 |
| Movie Wave | 2/5 stars |

The soundtrack album for Ghost Ship was released on November 5, 2002, on Varèse Sarabande. The songs "Not Falling" by Mudvayne and "Senza fine" sung by Monica Mancini are not part of the soundtrack despite being featured in the film.

The score is described by Filmtracks.com as "tap [dancing] around some old genre cliches while diving head first into others, producing a score with drama, fright, and a slight hint of elegance at times as well."

== Release ==
Ghost Ship was theatrically released on October 25, 2002. The theatrical poster for Ghost Ship is similar to that of the 1980 film Death Ship.

=== Promotion ===
Warner Bros. in association with Hollywood.com sponsored a sweepstakes to promote the film beginning October 18, 2002, with the final drawing on November 1. Applicants could enter for the chance to win the grand prize dubbed the "Ghost Ship Prize Package" of promotional Ghost Ship themed merchandise consisting of a baseball hat, a spinning skull mug, a shower CD player, and the film's soundtrack. The runners up would receive just the baseball hat and mug.

=== Home media ===
The film was released on VHS and DVD by Warner Home Video on March 28, 2003. On October 26, 2018, Official Charts Company revealed Ghost Ship was the United Kingdom's 26th best-selling horror DVD/Blu-ray of all time.

A collectors' edition of Ghost Ship was produced by Shout! Factory and released on Blu-ray September 29, 2020. It features a new interview with actor Isaiah Washington, and a new Audio commentary by director Steve Beck.

== Reception ==
=== Box office ===
With a reported budget of $20 million, the film opened at no. 3 at the box office with $11,503,423 in ticket sales as Jackass: The Movie dominated the cinema releases. The film grossed $30,113,491 in North America and had an international gross of $38,236,393, earning a total of $68,349,884.

=== Critical response ===
According to internet review aggregator Rotten Tomatoes, Ghost Ship has an approval rating of 14% based on 126 reviews, with an average rating of 3.8/10. The site's critical consensus reads: "With a plot as creaky as the boat, Ghost Ship fails to deliver the scares." Metacritic gives the film a weighted average score of 28 out of 100 based on 25 critics, indicating "generally unfavorable" reviews. Audiences polled by CinemaScore gave the film an average grade of "C+" on an A+ to F scale.

The film received varied critical reception in the United States: The New York Times's Stephen Holden criticized its preoccupation with special effects, and while praising its establishment of mood, ultimately deemed it "an incoherent supernatural thriller that would like to think of itself as a Halloween-ready horror fusion of The Perfect Storm and Titanic." Carla Meyer of the San Francisco Chronicle praised the performance of Isaiah Washington, but deemed the film "a stupid, derivative horror film that substitutes extreme gore for suspense. Granted, there are only so many ways to kill people in these pictures, but lingering on a woman on a meat hook doesn't make a movie scary. It makes it gross."

Manohla Dargis of the Los Angeles Times was critical of the script's lack of character development, writing: "With its minor shivers and modest Grand Guignol showmanship, Ghost Ship is the sort of flimflam that would have filled eight paneled pages in the great horror comic book Tales From the Crypt or consumed about 30 minutes on the latter-day HBO spinoff." Roger Ebert said the film is "better than you expect but not as good as you hope," while Joel Siegel of Good Morning America awarded the film a B− rating, writing: "After a very brutal and bloody beginning, Ghost Ship plays like an old-fashioned ghost story, the kind that kept you awake when you were a kid." In a review published by IGN, the reviewer awarded the film one-and-a-half out of five stars, stating: "as a horror fan, I applaud what Silver and Zemeckis are trying to do with Dark Castle, Ghost Ship just isn't a cruise worth taking."

Upon the film's release in the United Kingdom in January 2003, The Guardian's Peter Bradshaw praised its set design, but added "it's the same old tired stuff we've seen a hundred times before in various permutations." Jamie Russell of the BBC awarded the film two out of five stars, but praised its opening sequence.

While critical response to Ghost Ship was varied upon its theatrical release, many contemporary critics and film fans alike praised its elaborate opening murder sequence. Website Bloody Disgusting listed Ghost Ship's opening massacre as #13 in their list of "The Top 13 Kills in Horror Movie History," while ComingSoon named the scene one of the greatest opening sequences in horror film history.

=== Accolades ===
Accolades received by Ghost Ship
| Award | Date of ceremony | Category | Recipient(s) | Result | Ref(s) |
|---|---|---|---|---|---|
| Fangoria Chainsaw Awards | June 17, 2003 | Worst Picture | Ghost Ship | Nominated | |

== See also ==
- List of ghost films
