= Four Last Songs (film) =

2007 film

- Directed by: Francesca Joseph
- Written by: Francesca Joseph
- Produced by: Ruth Caleb
- Starring: Stanley Tucci; Rhys Ifans; Hugh Bonneville
- Cinematography: Javier Salmones
- Edited by: St. John O'Rorke
- Music by: Dan Jones
- Production companies: Capitol Films; BBC Films; Ingenious Media
- Distributed by: Union Station Media; Capitol Films
- Release date: 11 January 2007 (New Zealand)
- Running time: 110 minutes
- Country: United Kingdom
- Language: English

Four Last Songs is a 2007 British comedyasdrama film written and directed by Francesca Joseph and starring Stanley Tucci, Rhys Ifans, and Hugh Bonneville.

The film's title is taken from Four Last Songs, 1948 composition of Richard Strauss, surrounding acceptance of death.

== Plot ==
Larry (Stanley Tucci), an expat piano player, settled in a remote island village seven years ago. Now he runs a small boutique hotel with his girlfriend, Miranda (Jessica Hynes). Every evening he plays the piano at a local restaurant to inattentive customers; all this has left him highly unsatisfied, and he has always wanted to do something big in life. So one day he decides to host a gala concert dedicated to a native son and noted composer, Valentin Lucinsky, whose widow Veronica (Marisa Paredes) still resides in a grand villa in the village.

At first Larry manages to convince Veronica to allow the concert to be held at the local amphitheatre, where famous pianist Narcisco Ortega (Virgile Bramly) would play her late great spouse's music, 'chosen by her'. Things soon start to go awry, as his long lost daughter Frankie (Jena Malone) arrives out of the blue, looking for him, another socialasclimber, Sebastian Burrows (Hugh Bonneville), latches on to the project convincing Veronica to give it to him and Larry's girlfriend grows suspicious of his relationship with the composer's former muse, Helena (Emmanuelle Seigner), who leads a secluded life on the island. As the movie progresses, several sub plots reveal a variety of estrangements between various key characters, and gradually they are healed amidst the rising melodrama surrounding the concert.

== Cast ==
- Stanley Tucci as Larry
- Rhys Ifans as Dickie
- Hugh Bonneville as Sebastian Burrows
- Jena Malone as Frankie
- Jessica Hynes as Miranda (as Jessica Stevenson)
- Karl Johnson as Erico
- Virgile Bramly as Narcisco Ortega
- Marisa Paredes as Veronica
- Emmanuelle Seigner as Helena
- María Esteve as Sweetie

== Production ==
The film was shot entirely on location on the island of Mallorca in the Mediterranean Sea, part of the Balearic Islands archipelago in Spain. The Spanish version of the film is titled 'Mallorca's Song'.

== Credits ==
- Casting Director - Karen Lindsay Stewart
- Production Designer - John Stevenson
- Costume designer - Julian Day
- Production Company - BBC Films
- Domestic Video Distributor - Anchor Bay Entertainment
