= Thirteen Ghosts =

2001 film by Steve Beck

- Theatrical release poster
- Directed by: Steve Beck
- Screenplay by: Neal Marshall Stevens; Richard D'Ovidio
- Story by: Robb White
- Based on: 13 Ghosts by Robb White
- Produced by: Robert Zemeckis; Joel Silver; Gilbert Adler
- Starring: Tony Shalhoub; Embeth Davidtz; Matthew Lillard; Shannon Elizabeth; Alec Roberts; JR Bourne; Rah Digga; F. Murray Abraham
- Cinematography: Gale Tattersall
- Edited by: Derek G. Brechin; Edward A. Warschilka
- Music by: John Frizzell
- Production companies: Warner Bros. Pictures; Columbia Pictures; Dark Castle Entertainment
- Distributed by: Warner Bros. Pictures (North America); Columbia TriStar Film Distributors International (International)
- Release date: October 26, 2001 (U.S.)
- Running time: 91 minutes
- Countries: United States; Canada
- Language: English
- Budget: $42 million
- Box office: $68.5 million

Thirteen Ghosts (also known as 13 Ghosts and stylized as THIR13EN Ghosts) is a 2001 supernatural horror film directed by Steve Beck in his directorial debut. A remake of the 1960 film 13 Ghosts by William Castle, the film stars Tony Shalhoub, Embeth Davidtz, Matthew Lillard, Shannon Elizabeth, Alec Roberts, Rah Digga, and F. Murray Abraham.

Thirteen Ghosts was released on October 26, 2001 by Warner Bros. Pictures in the United States, with Columbia TriStar Film Distributors International releasing in other territories. The film was considered a box-office disappointment, grossing $68.5 million on a $42 million budget. Thirteen Ghosts received generally negative reviews from critics, though the production design was praised. Years after its release, the film garnered a cult following. In 2023, Dark Castle Entertainment announced a television adaptation.

== Plot ==
Ghost hunter Cyrus Kriticos and his psychic assistant, Dennis Rafkin, lead a specialized team on a mission to capture a spirit in a junkyard. Cyrus and several of his men are killed, but the team successfully captures the ghost. His nephew Arthur, a widower, is informed by Cyrus' estate lawyer, Ben Moss, that he has inherited Cyrus' mansion. Financially insecure, Arthur decides to move there with his two children, Kathy and Bobby, and their nanny, Maggie. Passing himself off as an electrical technician, Dennis meets the family at the mansion and enters with them. The structure is made entirely of glass panels inscribed with Latin phrases, which Dennis recognizes as barrier protection spells. He discovers that the twelve ghosts he and Cyrus captured are imprisoned within cells in the basement. Pairs of spectral glasses allow their wearers to see the ghosts. As Dennis warns Arthur about the ghosts, Moss picks up a briefcase filled with cash and unwittingly triggers a mechanism that seals the house and releases one of them. He backs away from her, only to be sliced in half and killed by a pair of closing doors. Bobby sees several of the ghosts, including his mother Jean, who had died from injuries sustained in a house fire. He is knocked unconscious and dragged away.

Kalina Oretzia, a spirit liberator attempting to free the ghosts, drives one of them away when it attacks Kathy and Arthur. Kathy disappears while Kalina is explaining her presence, and the four adults flee from the ghosts and take shelter in the library, where Arthur learns that Jean's ghost is one of those trapped in the house. Kalina tells them that the house is a machine which will be powered by the captive ghosts, allowing its users to see the past, present, and future. However, she says, a thirteenth ghost arising from a sacrifice motivated by pure love can act as a fail-safe and shut the house down. Arthur realizes that he must become that ghost by dying to save the children. Armed with the spectral glasses, Arthur and Dennis enter the basement to find the children. Dennis barricades Arthur behind a glass panel for his protection and is beaten to death by a ghost. Cyrus enters the house apparently as a ghost, but he has faked his death and made Kalina his lover and a secret partner in his scheme. Kalina has lied to Arthur about the thirteenth ghost, which will activate the machine instead of shutting it down. When Kalina objects to putting the children in danger, Cyrus kills her and summons the ghosts to the main hall. Arthur witnesses the ghosts standing around a clockwork device of whirling metal rings, with Kathy and Bobby at the center. He prepares to throw himself into the rings to create the thirteenth ghost, but realizes that Cyrus is alive. The two men fight as Maggie regains consciousness and disrupts the summoning, freeing the ghosts from Cyrus' control and causing the machine to malfunction. The ghosts seize Cyrus and throw him into the rings, slicing him to pieces, and Dennis appears as a ghost to encourage Arthur to save his children. Arthur leaps over the rings and lands at the center to protect them as the machine tears itself apart. The house's walls shatter, and the ghosts depart, with Jean giving her family one last smile before she disappears. As the family departs, Maggie angrily declares she is quitting as their nanny.

== Cast ==
- Tony Shalhoub as Arthur Kriticos
- Embeth Davidtz as Kalina Oretzia
- Matthew Lillard as Dennis Rafkin
- Shannon Elizabeth as Kathy Kriticos, Arthur's daughter
- Alec Roberts as Robert "Bobby" Kriticos, Arthur's son
- JR Bourne as Ben Moss
- Rah Digga as Maggie Bess
- F. Murray Abraham as Cyrus Kriticos, Arthur's estranged uncle

Ghosts Referred to as the Dark Zodiac.

- Mikhael Speidel as the First Born Son (Billy Michaels)
- Daniel Wesley as the Torso (Jimmy Gambino)
- Laura Mennell as the Bound Woman (Susan LaGrow)
- Kathryn Anderson as the Withered Lover (Jean Kriticos, Arthur's late wife)
- Craig Olejnik as the Torn Prince (Royce Clayton)
- Shawna Loyer as the Angry Princess (Dana Newman)
- Xantha Radley as the Pilgrimess (Isabella Smith)
- C. Ernst Harth as the Great Child (Harold Shelburne)
- Laurie Soper as the Dire Mother (Margaret Shelburne)
- Herbert Duncanson as the Hammer (George Markley)
- Shayne Wyler as the Jackal (Ryan Kuhn)
- John DeSantis as the Juggernaut (Horace Mahoney)

== Development ==
James Gunn performed rewrites to the script, but was uncredited. Some reshoots were filmed during September 11, 2001.

== Release ==
=== Home media ===
The film was released on VHS and DVD on April 2, 2002. The film initially debuted on the Blu-ray format on October 19, 2010, in a double feature with House of Wax (2005). A special collector's edition Blu-ray was released by Shout Factory under their Scream Factory label on July 28, 2020. This new release features brand new interviews with the cast and crew, plus a brand new audio commentary with director Steve Beck.

== Reception ==
=== Box office ===
In the US, the film opened ranking 2nd behind K-PAX, making $15,165,355. It spent 10 weeks in the US box office, eventually making $41,867,960 domestically, and $68,467,960 worldwide.

=== Critical reception ===
Reviews for Thirteen Ghosts were mostly negative. Praise was directed toward the production design, but the film was criticized for its lack of scares and several strobe effects throughout that could induce seizures. It holds an approval rating of 19% on review aggregator Rotten Tomatoes, based on 96 reviews with an average rating of 3.7/10. The website's critical consensus reads, "The production design is first rate, but 13 Ghosts is distinctly lacking in scares." On Metacritic, the film has a weighted average score of 30 out of 100, based on reviews from 24 critics, indicating "generally unfavorable reviews". Audiences polled by CinemaScore gave the film an average grade of "C+" on an A+ to F scale.

Ed Gonzalez of Slant Magazine rated the film two out of four stars, panning the film's lack of scares and predictable plot twists. However, Gonzalez commended the art direction, while also stating it was underutilized. Roger Ebert praised the production values, saying, "The production is first-rate...The physical look of the picture is splendid." However, he criticized the story, lack of interesting characters, loud soundtrack, and poor editing. In 2005 Ebert included it on his list of "Most Hated" films. Elvis Mitchell of The New York Times said of the film "what we're left with after the scares is just plain dumb."

In the years since its release and disappointing box office performance, the film has gathered a cult following.

== Future ==
In August 2023, Dark Castle Entertainment announced that they were planning to make a Thirteen Ghosts series.

== See also ==
- List of ghost films
