= The Limiñanas =

French rock band

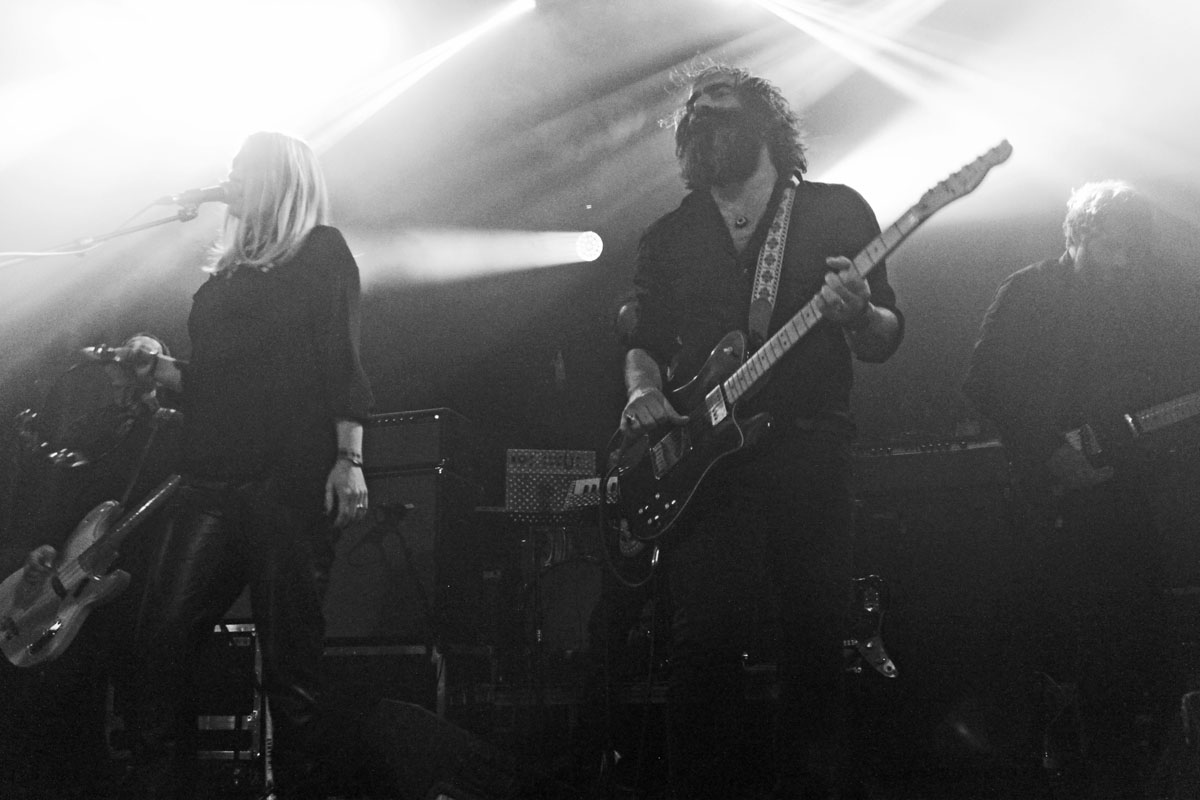

Background information
- Origin: Cabestany, Pyrénées-Orientales, France
- Genres: Psychedelic rock; indie rock; garage rock
- Years active: 2009–present
- Labels: Because Music; Trouble In Mind; HoZac; Berreto Music
- Spinoffs: L'Épée
- Members: Lionel Limiñana; Marie Limiñana
- Website: www.theliminanas.com

The Limiñanas are a French rock band from Cabestany, Pyrénées-Orientales, active since 2009.

== Biography ==
Lionel and Marie Limiñana met during high school. After 15 years of participating in various bands, selling records in Perpignan, and organizing concerts, they founded the Limiñanas in 2009. Two tracks ("I'm Dead" and "Migas 2000") shared on Myspace helped the band gain attention which led them to signing with independent labels Trouble In Mind and HoZac.

During their early years, distributed exclusively by American labels, the duo gained greater notoriety in the United States than in France. In 2010, the series Gossip Girl used the track "Down Underground" in an episode of its fourth season.

In 2015, following a joint album with Pascal Comelade, the band signed to French label Because Music, who reissued their discography in Europe which benefited the group with increased promotion.

In 2016, British magazine Mojo invited the Limiñanas to record a version of the Kinks' "Two Sisters" as part of a cover album, the first time the band worked with Anton Newcombe of the Brian Jonestown Massacre.

In 2018, the release of Shadow People, produced in Berlin by Anton Newcombe, gained the band a wider audience: magazine Rock & Folk offered the duo to appear on the cover of their January issue, and Canal+ made Shadow People its album of the week.

In 2019, their debut album single "Migas 2000" was chosen as one of the recurring themes in the American Netflix series Russian Doll. Later that year, the Limiñanas collaborated with actress Emmanuelle Seigner and Anton Newcombe in the group L'Épée to release the album Diabolique.

Since 2021, their music has been published by the label Berreto Music and appears to be still distributed by Because Music.

In 2022, the Limiñanas released the single "La Musique", a previously unreleased track written and performed with Areski Belkacem. It appeared their 2022 compilation Electrified.

== Discography ==
=== Studio albums ===
==== The Bellas ====
- Belladelic (2010)

==== The Limiñanas ====
- The Limiñanas (2010)
- Crystal Anis (2012)
- Costa Blanca (2013)
- Traité de guitares triolectiques (à l'usage des portugaises ensablées) (with Pascal Comelade) (2015)
- Malamore (2016)
- Shadow People (2018)
- Le bel été (Film score) (2019)
- De Pelicula (with Laurent Garnier) (2021)
- The World We Knew (Film soundtrack) (2021)
- The Devil Inside Me (Film soundtrack) (2021)
- The Ballad of Linda L. (Film soundtrack) (2022)
- Boom Boom (2023)
- Faded (2025)

=== Compilations ===
- 2015 : I've Got Trouble in Mind: 7" and Rare Stuff 2009-2014
- 2018 : I've Got Trouble in Mind - Vol.2: 7" and Rare Stuff 2015-2018
- 2022 : Electrified (from 2009 to 2022)
