= Ultra Orange & Emmanuelle =

Album by Emmanuelle Seigner

- album cover for Ultra Orange & Emmanuelle

Background information
- Origin: Île-de-France, France
- Genres: Indie; Alternative
- Label: SONY BMG
- Members: Pierre Emery, Gil Lesage & Emmanuelle Seigner

Ultra Orange & Emmanuelle was a collaboration between French actress Emmanuelle Seigner and Ultra Orange.

== Background ==
The Ultra Orange of this merger is duo Pierre Emery and Gil Lesage, who released two previous albums in France before teaming up with Seigner. Their self-titled album was released on 26 March 2007. They have been likened to such artists as Velvet Underground, Mazzy Star, Sonic Youth, and even Brigitte Bardot.

== Discography ==
=== Ultra Orange & Emmanuelle ===
1. "Sing Sing" – 3:31
2. "Simple Words" – 4:42
3. "Rosemary's Lullaby" – 4:57
4. "Bunny" – 3:06
5. "Lines of My Hand" – 2:31
6. "Touch My Shadow" – 3:31
7. "Don't Kiss Me Goodbye" – 4:15
8. "Won't Lovers Revolt Now" – 3:30
9. "Nobody Knows" – 4:30
10. "The Good from the Bad" – 3:19
11. "One Day" – 2:34

== Notes ==
The lead single from the album was "Sing Sing", the music video was shot in black and white. It had a limited run on ABCs Rage Music Program.

The song "Don't Kiss Me Goodbye" is featured in the movie Le Scaphandre et le papillon (The Diving Bell and the Butterfly).

The song "Rosemary's Lullaby" samples the basic tune of the theme from the Roman Polanski film Rosemary's Baby. Emmanuelle Seigner is married to Polanski.
