= Steve Beck (director) =

American commercial and film director

- Born: Steve Michael Beck
- Occupation: Director
- Notable work: Thirteen Ghosts; Ghost Ship

Steve Michael Beck is a former American commercial and film director.

== Life and career ==
Beck has directed commercials for First Union, GMC and Chevrolet, McDonald's and Gatorade.

He has spent several years working for Industrial Light & Magic (ILM) as a visual effects art director on films like Indiana Jones and the Last Crusade, The Abyss, and The Hunt for Red October.

As a filmmaker, he directed two feature films, Thirteen Ghosts and Ghost Ship, both for Dark Castle Entertainment.

== Filmography ==
Director

- Thirteen Ghosts (2001)
- Ghost Ship (2002)

Visual effects

- The Hunt for Red October (1990) (visual effects art director: ILM)
- The Abyss (1989) (effects art director: ILM)
- Indiana Jones and the Last Crusade (1989) (visual effects art director)
