= Neal Marshall Stevens =

American screenwriter

- Occupations: Screenwriter, educator
- Known for: Hellraiser: Deader; Thirteen Ghosts

Neal Marshall Stevens is an American screenwriter, author, teacher and writer, best known for writing several Hollywood horror films such as Thirteen Ghosts.

== Education ==
Stevens studied at NYU's Graduate School of Film and Television.

== Career ==
He began his career on Laurel Entertainment's series, Monsters which aired from 1988 to 1991. He went on to work as Laurel's Senior Story editor on other projects, including The Vernon Johns Story, Precious Victims and Stephen King's The Stand. He wrote Thirteen Ghosts, a 2001 remake of the 1960 film 13 Ghosts by William Castle, for Dark Castle Entertainment. In the US, the film opened ranking 2nd, making $15,165,355. His original screenplay, Deader was bought by to Dimension Pictures, and subsequently produced as Hellraiser: Deader, a 2005 sequel in the long-running horror franchise created by Clive Barker.

Into the late 2000s and 2010s, much of Stevens' output would veer towards direct-to-video releases. He would write Puppet Master: Axis Termination, the twelfth film in the titular series for Full Moon Pictures, and the later sequel Blade: The Iron Cross in 2020.

In 2012, Stevens wrote the comic Havoc Brigade. In 2022, Stevens published a screenwriting manual, A Sense of Dread: Getting Under the Skin of Horror Screenwriting. The book draws from his extensive film experience and analyzes concepts of fear and how they can be applied in cinema. He also teaches screenwriting at Maharashi International University
