= Mark Hanlon =

American film director and screenwriter

- Occupations: Film director, screenwriter

Mark Hanlon is an American film director and screenwriter, best known for directing the 1999 independent film Buddy Boy. Starring Aidan Gillen and Emmanuelle Seigner, it premiered at the 56th Venice International Film Festival in the Cinema of the Present section. He also wrote the Warner Bros. horror film Ghost Ship, starring Julianna Margulies and Gabriel Byrne.

== Awards and nominations ==
Hanlon received a national News & Documentary Emmy nomination in 2016 for producing and directing A Strange Relativity, a documentary about neurosurgeon and cancer patient Paul Kalanithi, writer of the best-selling memoir When Breath Becomes Air. He received three regional Emmy nominations for health, science & environment feature stories and for outstanding achievement in video journalism in 2018.
