= Emmanuelle Seigner =

French actress

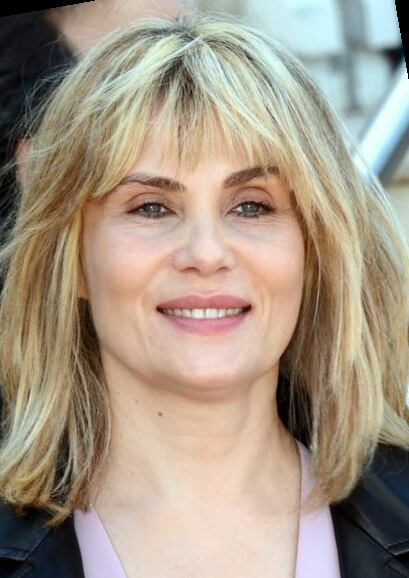
- Seigner at the 2013 Cannes Film Festival
- Born: 22 June 1966 (age 60); Paris, France
- Occupations: Actress; singer; model
- Years active: 1984–present
- Spouse: Roman Polanski (m. 1989)
- Children: 2, including Morgane Polanski
- Relatives: Louis Seigner (grandfather); Françoise Seigner (aunt); Mathilde Seigner (sister)

Emmanuelle Seigner (French: [ɛmanɥɛl sɛɲe]; born 22 June 1966) is a French actress and singer. She is known for her roles in The Diving Bell and the Butterfly (2007), The Ninth Gate (1999) and Frantic (1988). She has been nominated for a César Award for Best Actress for Venus in Fur (2013), and for two César Awards for Best Supporting Actress in Place Vendôme (1998) and La Vie en Rose (2007). She has been married to Polish film director Roman Polanski since 1989.

== Life and career ==
=== Early life ===
Seigner is the daughter of Jean-Louis Seigner (1941–2020), photographer, and Aline Ponelle, journalist. She is the older sister of Mathilde Seigner, actress, and Marie-Amélie Seigner, singer. Through their father, they are the granddaughters of the actor Louis Seigner (1903-1991) and the nieces of the actress Françoise Seigner (1928-2008), both deans and members of the Comédie-Française. She is the niece of doctor Véronique Vasseur.

She was educated at a Catholic convent school, and began modelling at the age of fourteen.

=== Films ===
Seigner's husband directed her in Frantic (1988), Bitter Moon (1992), The Ninth Gate (1999), Venus in Fur (2013), Based On A True Story (2017) and An Officer and a Spy (2019). In 2010, Seigner was featured in Jerzy Skolimowski's Essential Killing, which went on to win the Special Jury Prize at the Venice Film Festival. In 2012, she played the principal role of Vanda in Polanski's French film adaptation of David Ives's two-character play Venus in Fur, based on the Austrian novel of the near-same name, for which she received praise as Vanda, an actress, playing against writer and theatre director Thomas played by Mathieu Amalric.

=== Music ===
Seigner appears as the main character in the music video "Hands Around My Throat" by Death in Vegas. In 2006, she became the lead singer of the pop rock band Ultra Orange, and the group's name was changed to Ultra Orange & Emmanuelle. They released a self-titled album in 2007. Seigner released a solo album called Distant Lover in 2014. As a member of the band L'Épée, in 2019 she released an album "Diabolique" with The Limiñanas and Anton Newcombe of The Brian Jonestown Massacre.

=== Other activities ===
From 2008, Seigner was an ambassadress of the Polish brand Dr Irena Eris.

== Personal life ==
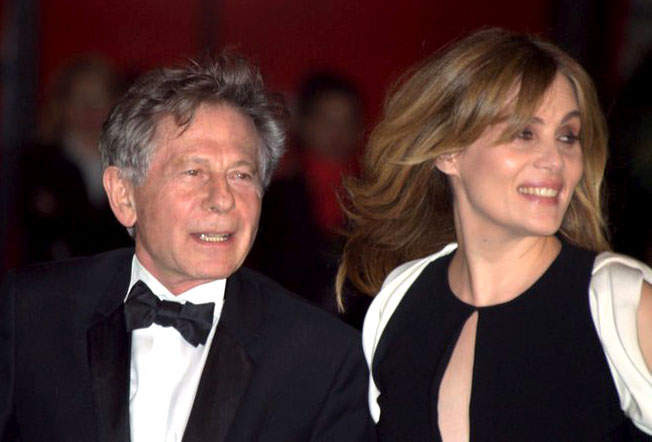
Seigner with husband Roman Polanski at the César Awards 2011

Seigner married Roman Polanski on 30 August 1989, in the 8th arrondissement of Paris. They have two children, including Morgane. She and Polanski live in Paris.

== Filmography ==
Year	Title	Role	Director	Notes
1985	Détective	Princess of the Bahamas	Jean-Luc Godard	
1986	Cours privé	Zanon	Pierre Granier-Deferre	
1988	Frantic	Michelle	Roman Polanski	
1990	Dark Illness	The Girl	Mario Monicelli	
1992	Bitter Moon	Micheline "Mimi" Bouvier	Roman Polanski (2)	
1994	Le Sourire	Odile	Claude Miller	
1996	Let's Hope it Lasts	Julie Neyrac	Michel Thibaud	
1997	Nirvana	Lisa	Gabriele Salvatores	
1997	La divine poursuite	Bobbi	Michel Deville	
1998	RPM	Michelle Claire	Ian Sharp	
1998	Place Vendôme	Nathalie	Nicole Garcia	Nominated – César Award for Best Supporting Actress
1999	The Ninth Gate	The Girl	Roman Polanski (3)	
1999	Buddy Boy	Gloria	Mark Hanlon	
2001	Laguna	Thelma Pianon	Dennis Berry	
2001	Witches to the North	Lucilla	Giovanni Veronesi	
2003	Corps à corps	Laura Bartelli	François Hanss	
2003	Os Imortais	Madeleine Durand	António-Pedro Vasconcelos	
2004	Happily Ever After	Nathalie	Yvan Attal	
2004	Sans toi	Armelle	Liria Bégéja	Short
2005	Backstage	Lauren Waks	Emmanuelle Bercot	
2007	La Vie en rose	Titine	Olivier Dahan	Nominated – Satellite Award for Best Supporting Actress – Motion Picture
2007	The Diving Bell and the Butterfly	Céline Desmoulins	Julian Schnabel	
2007	Four Last Songs	Helena	Francesca Joseph	
2009	Giallo	Linda	Dario Argento	
2009	Change of Plans	Sarah Mattei	Danièle Thompson	
2010	Essential Killing	Margaret	Jerzy Skolimowski	
2010	Chicas	Nuria	Yasmina Reza	
2012	A Few Hours of Spring	Clémence	Stéphane Brizé	
2012	In the House	Esther Artole	François Ozon	
2012	The Man Who Laughs	Duchess Josiane	Jean-Pierre Améris	
2013	Venus in Fur	Vanda Jourdain	Roman Polanski (4)	International Cinephile Society Award – Best Actress; Nominated – César Award for Best Actress; Nominated – Globes de Cristal Award for Best Actress; Nominated – Lumière Award for Best Actress
2013	Croire	Isabelle	Nicolas Cazalé	Short
2016	Heal the Living	Marianne	Katell Quillévéré	
2016	Le divan de Staline	Lidia	Fanny Ardant	
2016	The Siege of Jadotville	Madame LaFontagne	Richie Smyth	
2017	Based on a True Story	Delphine	Roman Polanski (5)	
2018	At Eternity's Gate	The Woman from Arles / Madame Ginoux	Julian Schnabel (2)	
2019	An Officer and a Spy	Pauline Monnier	Roman Polanski (6)	
2023	Pet Shop Days	Diana	Olmo Schnabel	

== Discography ==
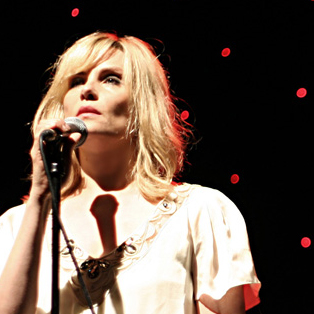
Seigner in concert at the Mermaid Theatre London, 7 July 2008

=== Studio albums ===
- Ultra Orange & Emmanuelle (2007) Sony
- Dingue (2010)
- Distant Lover (2014)
- Diabolique (as L'épée) (2019) (with Anton Newcombe & The Limiñanas)

=== Singles ===
- "Les Mots Simples" (2008) (with Brett Anderson)
