= Sasha Hails =

British screenwriter, playwright and actress

Sasha Hails is a screenwriter, playwright and actress.

She is the co-creator and lead writer of the Emmy-nominated BBC series Malory Towers and the lead writer for Netflix's The Last Czars. She received a nomination for Best Writer at The Stage Debut awards 2023 for her play Possession.

== Early career ==
Hails studied at the University of Cambridge. She co-founded the Talking Tongues theatre company alongside fellow student Rachel Weisz and performed Slight Possession at Edinburgh in 1991. Hails and Weisz performed together in Shameless Extras. Hails worked with French director François Ozon starring as Rose in film Une rose entre nous, and as Sasha in his film Regarde la mer, for which she won a best actress award at Pantin.

== Screenwriting ==
Hails transitioned from acting into a television writing career. She co-wrote the film Mad Cows starring Joanna Lumley and Anna Friel.. Other early credits include BBC's The Story Makers

Hails went on to write for major British soap operas and continuing dramas: Doctors, EastEnders, Holby City and 24 episodes of Casualty. Her episode "Saturday Night Fever" was nominated for a Writers' Guild Award, and her 2013 episode "Unsilenced" which tackled female genital mutilation (FGM), earned a BAFTA nomination and won a BBC production award. With Rachel Flowerday, she co-wrote the BBC's five-part adaptation of Wilkie Collins's The Moonstone. She was lead writer for Netflix's historical docudrama The Last Czars. She co-created and was lead writer for tv series adaptation of Enid Blyton's Malory Towers. The series received six Children's and Family Emmy nominations in 2025 and Rose d'Or nominations in 2020 and 2022. She has also written for Wizards versus Aliens by Russell T Davies, Waterloo Road, Belgravia: The Next Chapter, The Midwich Cuckoos, Versailles and Call the Midwife.

== Radio ==
Radio work includes episodes of Westway , BBC World Service where she was a regular writer from 2003; Best Interests,. a BBC Radio 4 drama; and Bournewood BBC Radio 4 drama

== Theatre ==
Hails was nominated for Best Writer by The Stage Debut Awards 2023 for her play Possession, at the Arcola Theatre.
