= Buddy Boy =

- Directed by: Mark Hanlon
- Written by: Mark Hanlon
- Produced by: Cary Woods; Gina Mingacci
- Starring: Aidan Gillen; Emmanuelle Seigner; Susan Tyrrell; Mark Boone Junior
- Cinematography: Hubert Taczanowski
- Edited by: Hughes Winborne
- Music by: Michael Brook; Brian Eno; Graeme Revell
- Distributed by: Fine Line Features
- Release dates: September 5, 1999 (Venice); September 16, 1999 (TIFF); March 24, 2000 (United States)
- Running time: 105 minutes
- Country: United States
- Language: English

Buddy Boy is a 1999 psychological thriller film written and directed by Mark Hanlon and starring Aidan Gillen, Emmanuelle Seigner and Susan Tyrrell. The film premiered at the 56th Venice International Film Festival.

Rex Reed of The New York Observer called it "a curious, unsettling, darkly conceived and absolutely fascinating little film. Not since Roman Polanski at the pinnacle of his European weirdness have I seen a film this strange and riveting."

== Plot ==
The film's title character, Francis, lives with his invalid, abusive mother Sal in a dingy tenement apartment, and has suffered a life of unrelenting misfortune and brutality, further impacted by a stutter. Over time, he has withdrawn from the world and into himself, silently observing others rather than interacting with them. His only solace has been his Catholic faith, but he has begun to question his belief in a loving God who could countenance so much evil and pain.

When he discovers he can see into the apartment of Gloria from his own back stairs, Francis cannot stop watching her, even after he meets her and they become romantically involved. Unable or unwilling to believe that she could actually love him, he becomes ever more obsessive in his voyeurism. And it is what Francis sees – or thinks he sees – that leads ultimately to his undoing.

== Cast ==
- Aidan Gillen as Francis
- Emmanuelle Seigner as Gloria
- Susan Tyrrell as Sal
- Mark Boone Junior as Vic
- Harry Groener as Father Gillespie

== Release ==
Buddy Boy premiered to a standing ovation at the Venice International Film Festival on September 5, 1999, in the Cinema del Presente section. It subsequently bowed at the 1999 Toronto International Film Festival (World Cinema section) and South by Southwest Film Festival, before being released theatrically by Fine Line Features in North America on March 24, 2000.

Following its North American premiere, the film was released theatrically worldwide. International DVD releases have been made in Japan, Italy, Spain, France and the United Kingdom. The special edition DVD was released in North America by Image Entertainment on September 25, 2005.

On September 11, 2007, Buddy Boy was released as part of a three-film DVD triptych along with Antonia Bird's Face and Peter Medak's Let Him Have It.
